= Heide Gerstenberger =

German economist (born 1940)

- Born: 21 July 1940 (age 86); Heuchlingen
- Scientific career
- Fields: Economy; Political science
- Workplaces: University of Bremen

Heide Gerstenberger (born 21 July 1940) is a German political scientist and economist. She has been Professor of Theory of Civil Society at the State at the University of Bremen since 1974. She was awarded emeritus status in 2005.

== Life ==
Gerstenberger, born in Heuchlingen in 1940, studied social sciences in Wilhelmshaven, Stellenbosch and Göttingen from 1960 to 1964. Following her studies, she initially worked as a contract teacher at the vocational school in Reutlingen and later as a member of staff at the adult education center in Düsseldorf.

In 1966, she received a doctoral scholarship from the Friedrich Ebert Foundation and returned to the University of Göttingen. In 1968, Gerstenberger received her doctorate (Dr. disc. pol.) on the subject of revolutionary conservatism. From 1966 to 1974, she was a research assistant at the Department of Political Science at the University of Göttingen.

In 1968, Gerstenberger was delegated by the Federal Assistants' Conference to the founding senate for the University of Bremen, which began its work on 19 September. Gerstenberger chaired the founding senate from 13 April 1970, until the founding rector Thomas von der Vring was elected on 29 June 1970.

In 1972, Gerstenberger habilitated with her thesis Die politische Ökonomie der bürgerlichen Gesellschaft. Its constitution in the USA. In 1974, Gerstenberger was appointed to the position of Theory of Bourgeois Society and the State at the University of Bremen.

Gerstenberger was a member of the scientific advisory board of Attac.

At the Historical Materialism Conference 2023, she was honored for the English-language version of her book Markt und Gewalt. Die Funktionsweise des historischen Kapitalismus with the Isaac and Tamara Deutscher Memorial Prize.

== Main focus of work ==
Gerstenberger works on a broad spectrum of social theory and social history topics. These range from works on local social history to works on poverty and social policy to research on the functioning of National Socialist rule. The focus is always on the analysis of the historical development and current structures of modern states.

Gerstenberger is currently working on problems of globalization, different forms of capitalist societies and processes of impoverishment on a global scale. She has also researched and published on the historical connection between the market and violence.

Since 1992, Gerstenberger has also been involved in research on the historical and current practice of merchant shipping and maritime sociology.

== Publications since 1995 ==
- La violence dans l'histoire de l'Etat, ou la puissance de définir. In: Lignes Nr. 25 (1995), S. 23–33.
- In Betreff des Schiffsdienstes. In: H. Gerstenberger & U. Welke, Hg. 1994, S. 76–120.
- Das Handwerk der Seefahrt im Zeitalter der Industrialisierung. Bremen 1995.
- Heiliger Petrus, Führung, Ziel. In: Heide Gerstenberger & Ulrich Welke, Hrsg. (1995), S. 8–16.
- Mit Gebet und ohne Schnaps. Vom Frieden an Bord in Zeiten des Umbruchs. In: Deutsches Schiffahrtsarchiv 18 (1995), S. 49–56.
- Ancien Régime und Neue Welt. Elemente gesellschaftlicher und politischer Formation in Nordamerika vom 16. bis zum 18. Jahrhundert. In: F. Edelmayer, B. Hausberger, M. Weinzierl (Hrsg.): Die Beiden Amerikas. Frankfurt/M. 1996, S. 81–95.
- ...daß wir gar nichts wissen außerhalb des unmittelbar selbst Erlebten. In: Mittelweg 36, 5. Jg. (1996), S. 49–56.
- Sozialgeschichte der Technik: Von der Kunst des Navigierens zum wissenschaftlich-technischen System der Astro-Navigation. In: Geschichte und Gesellschaft, 22. Jg. (1996) S. 194–220.
- Entwarnung in der Armutspolitik?. In: Mittelweg 36, 5. Jg. (1996), Nr. 3, S. 66 ff.
- Deutscher im verwegensten Sinne des Wortes. In: Mittelweg 36, 5. Jg. (1996), Nr. 5, S. 36 ff.
- The concept of "total institution" in the analysis of seafaring. International Journal of Maritime History, 8. Jg., H 1, 1996, S. 173–182.
- Vom Wind zum Dampf. Sozialgeschichte der deutschen Handelsschiffahrt im Zeitalter der Modernisierung. Münster 1996.
- Edition von: Bremer Freiheiten. Zur Geschichte und Gegenwart des Stadtstaates Bremen. Bremen 1997.
- Meine Prinzipien über das Deutschtum und die verschiedenen Nationalitäten sind ins Wackeln gekommen wie die Zähne eines alten Mannes, Victor Klemperer in seinem Verhältnis zu Deutschland und den Deutschen. In: Hannes Heer (Hrsg.): Im Herzen der Finsternis. Victor Klemperer als Chronist der NS-Zeit. Berlin 1997, S. 10–20.
- Zur See? Maritime Gewerbe an Nord- und Ostsee. Münster 1999.
- Ganze Dörfer widmeten sich vorwiegend dem seemännischen Beruf. In: H. Gerstenberger & U. Welke, Hrsg. (1999), S. 107–137.
- "Disembedding" – und "Re-Embedding"? Oder: Wie aktuell ist Polanyis Analyse "The Great Transformation"?. In: Festschrift für Jörg Huffschmid, Hamburg 2000.
- daß dieses und jenes aus der neuen Navigation...ganz unnötig sei. In: 200 Jahre Seefahrtsausbildung in Bremen, Hg. Hochschule Bremen, Fachbereich Nautik und internationale Wirtschaft, Bremen 2000 (keine Seitenangaben).
- Die Schiffsgemeinschaft. In: Jahrbuch 1999 der Deutschen Gesellschaft für Schiffahrts- und Marinegeschichte, 5. Jg., Düsseldorf 2000, S. 73–79.
- Die subjektlose Gewalt. Theorie der Entstehung bürgerlicher Staatsgewalt. 2., verbesserte Auflage, Münster: Verlag Westfälisches Dampfboot 2006 (zuerst 1990)
  - English translation: Impersonal Power. History and Theory of the Bourgeois State. Brill, Leiden 2007, ISBN 978-90-04-13027-2.
- Markt und Gewalt. Die Funktionsweise des historischen Kapitalismus. Münster: Westfälisches Dampfboot 2017, ISBN 978-3-89691-125-4. (2. korrigierte Auflage 2018).
  - English translation: Market and Violence. The Functioning of Capitalism in History. Brill, Leiden 2022, ISBN 978-90-04-52212-1.
- together with Claudia von Braunmühl, Ralf Ptak, Christa Wichterich (Hrsg.): ABC der globalen (Un)Ordnung. Von »Anthropozän« bis »Zivilgesellschaft«, Hamburg: VSA-Verlag 2019, ISBN 978-3-96488-003-1.
- together with Ulrich Welke: Auf den Wogen von Meeren und Mächten. Münster: Westfälisches Dampfboot 2022, ISBN 978-3-89691-071-4.
- Staatsgewalten. Münster: Westfälisches Dampfboot 2023, ISBN 978-3-89691-090-5.
