= Teschke =

Teschke is a surname. Notable people with the surname include:

- Benno Teschke (born 1967), German international relations theorist
- Jana Teschke (born 1990), German field hockey player
