= Framing the Early Middle Ages =

2005 history book by Christopher Wickham

Framing the Early Middle Ages: Europe and the Mediterranean 400–800
- Author: Christopher Wickham
- Subject: Medieval studies
- Publisher: Oxford University Press
- Publication date: 8 December 2005
- Media type: Print
- Pages: 1,018 pp (hardcover)
- ISBN: 978-0-1992-6449-0

Framing the Early Middle Ages: Europe and the Mediterranean 400–800 is a 2005 history book by English historian Christopher Wickham at the University of Oxford. It is a broad history of the period between the fall of the Western Roman Empire and the transition to the Middle Ages, often called Late Antiquity.

The book won the 2005 Wolfson History Prize, the 2006 Deutscher Memorial Prize, and the 2006 James Henry Breasted Prize from the American Historical Association.

According to Chris Wickham's website, the book will "lead into a general study of the early middle ages for Penguin books." This book, titled The Inheritance of Rome: A History of Europe from 400 to 1000, was published on March 24, 2009.

== Editions ==
- Hardcover, Oxford University Press, ISBN 978-0-19-926449-0
- Paperback, ISBN 978-0-19-921296-5

== See also ==
- The Medieval New: Ambivalence in an Age of Innovation by Patricia Clare Ingham
