= Deutscher Memorial Prize =

Annual British literary award

The Isaac and Tamara Deutscher Memorial Prize is an annual prize given in honour of historian Isaac Deutscher and his wife Tamara Deutscher for a new book published in English "which exemplifies the best and most innovative new writing in or about the Marxist tradition." It has been ongoing since 1969.

As of November 2025, members of the Deutscher Jury include Gilbert Achcar, Alex Callinicos, Alejandro Colas, Ben Fine, Rob Knox, Chun Lin, Esther Leslie, Alfredo Saad-Filho, Gabriel Winant, and Lea Ypi.

Recipients include Jairus Banaji (2011, Theory as History: Essays on Modes of Production and Exploitation), David Harvey (2010, The Enigma of Capital and the Crises of Capitalism), Rick Kuhn (2007, for a biography of Henryk Grossman), Christopher Wickham (2006, for Framing the Early Middle Ages), Brian Kelly (2002, Race, Class and Power in the Alabama Coalfields), Francis Wheen (1999, for a biography of Karl Marx), Eric Hobsbawm (1995, for The Age of Extremes), Terry Eagleton (1989, The Ideology of the Aesthetic), Robert Brenner (1985, for The Brenner Debate), and G. A. Cohen (1978, for Karl Marx's Theory of History: A Defence).

Winning authors may contribute to the Deutscher Memorial Lecture series the following year; the lecture, or a text based upon it, is published in a variety of outlets, including Historical Materialism, the New Left Review, International Socialism, and the International Socialist Review.

== Recipients ==
| Year | Winner | Book | Publisher | Deutscher Memorial Lecture |
|---|---|---|---|---|
| 1969 | Martin Nicolaus | "The Unknown Marx" | New Left Review | |
| 1970 | István Mészáros | Marx's Theory of Alienation | Merlin | |
| 1971 | Not awarded | N/A | N/A | N/A |
| 1972 | Paul Walton and Andrew Gamble | From Alienation to Surplus Value | Macmillan | |
| 1973 | Lucio Colletti | From Rousseau to Lenin: Studies in Ideology and Society | NLB | |
| 1974 | Maxime Rodinson | Marxism and Islam | Allen Lane | |
| 1975 | Marcel Liebman | Leninism Under Lenin | Cape | |
| 1976 | Włodzimierz Brus | Socialist Ownership and Political Systems | RKP | |
| 1977 | S. S. Prawer | Karl Marx and World Literature | Verso | |
| 1978 | Rudolf Bahro | The Alternative in Eastern Europe | NLB | |
| 1979 | G. A. Cohen | Karl Marx's Theory of History: A Defence | Oxford University Press | 'Freedom, Justice and Capitalism' |
| 1980 | Bob Rowthorn | Capitalism, Conflict and Inflation: Essays in Political Economy | Lawrence & Wishart | |
| 1981 | Neil Harding | Lenin's Political Thought | Macmillan | |
| 1982 | G. E. M. de Ste. Croix | The Class Struggle in the Ancient Greek World: From the Archaic Age to the Arab Conquests | Duckworth | ‘Class in Marx's Conception of History, Ancient and Modern’ |
| 1983 | Barbara Taylor | Eve and the New Jerusalem: Socialism and Feminism in the Nineteenth Century | Virago | |
| 1984 | Margaret A. Rose | Marx's Lost Aesthetic: Karl Marx and the Visual Arts | Cambridge University Press | |
| 1985 | Robert Brenner | The Brenner Debate: Agrarian Class Structure and Economic Development in Pre-industrial Europe | Cambridge University Press | |
| 1986 | Ellen Meiksins Wood | The Retreat from Class: A New "True" Socialism | Verso | |
| 1987 | Teodor Shanin | Russia, 1905–07: Revolution as a Moment of Truth | Macmillan | |
| 1988 | Boris Kagarlitsky | Thinking Reed: Intellectuals and the Soviet State 1917 to the Present | Verso | |
| 1989 | Terry Eagleton | The Ideology of Aesthetic | Blackwell | |
| 1990 | Arno J. Mayer | Why Did the Heavens Not Darken? The Final Solution in History | Verso | |
| 1991 | Mike Davis | City of Quartz: Excavating the Future in Los Angeles | Vintage Books | |
| 1992 | Len Doyal and Ian Gough | A Theory of Human Need | Macmillan | |
| 1993 | Harvey J. Kaye | The Education of Desire: Marxists and the Writing of History | Routledge | |
| 1994 | Justin Rosenberg | The Empire of Civil Society: A Critique of the Realist Theory of International Relations | Verso | ‘Isaac Deutscher and the Lost History of International Relations’ |
| 1995 | Eric Hobsbawm | The Age of Extremes: A History of the World, 1914–1991 | M. Joseph | |
| 1996 | Donald Sassoon | One Hundred Years of Socialism: The West European Left in the Twentieth Century | I.B.Tarius | |
| 1997 | Robin Blackburn | The Making of New World Slavery: From the Baroque to the Modern, 1492–1800 | Verso | |
| 1998 | Not awarded | N/A | N/A | N/A |
| 1999 | Francis Wheen | Karl Marx | Fourth Estate | |
| 2000 | Peter Gowan | The Global Gamble: Washington's Faustian Bid for World Dominance | Verso | |
| 2001 | James Holstun | Ehud's Dagger: Class Struggle in the English Revolution | Verso | |
| 2002 | Brian Kelly | Race, Class and Power in the Alabama Coalfields, 1908–1921 | University of Illinois Press | ‘Materialism and the Persistence of Race in the Jim Crow South’ |
| 2003 | Neil Davidson | Discovering the Scottish Revolution | Pluto Press | ‘How Revolutionary were the Bourgeois Revolutions?’ |
| 2003 | Benno Teschke | The Myth of 1648: Class, Geopolitics, and the Making of Modern International Relations | Verso | 'Bourgeois Revolution, State Formation and the Absence of the International' |
| 2004 | Michael A. Lebowitz | Beyond Capital: Marx's Political Economy of the Working Class (2nd edition) | Palgrave Macmillan | 'The Politics of Assumption, the Assumption of Politics' |
| 2005 | Kevin Murphy | Revolution and Counterrevolution: Class Struggle in a Moscow Metal Factory | Berghahn Books | 'Can we write the history of the Russian Revolution?' |
| 2006 | Chris Wickham | Framing the Early Middle Ages, Europe and the Mediterranean, 400–800 | Oxford University Press | 'Problems Concerning the Economic Logic of the Feudal Mode' |
| 2007 | Rick Kuhn | Henryk Grossman and the Recovery of Marxism | University of Illinois Press | 'Economic crisis and the responsibility of socialists' |
| 2008 | Kees van der Pijl | Nomads, Empires, States: Modes of Foreign Relations and Political Economy | Pluto Press | 'Historicising the International: Modes of Foreign Relations and Political Economy' |
| 2009 | Dimitris Milonakis and Ben Fine | From Economics Imperialism to Freakonomics: The Shifting Boundaries Between Economics and Other Social Sciences | Routledge | ‘“Useless but True”: Economic Crisis and the Peculiarities of Economic Science’ |
| 2010 | David Harvey | The Enigma of Capital and the Crises of Capitalism | Profile Books | 'History Versus Theory: A Commentary on Marx’s Method in Capital' |
| 2011 | Jairus Banaji | Theory as History: Essays on Modes of Production and Exploitation | Brill | 'Seasons of Self-Delusion: Opium, Capitalism and the Financial Markets' |
| 2012 | David McNally | Monsters of the Market: Zombies, Vampires and Global Capitalism | Brill | 'The Blood of the Commonwealth: War, the State, and the Making of World Money’ |
| 2013 | Sam Gindin and Leo Panitch | The Making of Global Capitalism: The Political Economy of American Empire | Verso | 'Marxist Theory and Strategy: Getting Somewhere Better' |
| 2014 | Roland Boer | In the Vale of Tears: On Marxism and Theology V | Brill | |
| 2015 | Tamás Krausz | Reconstructing Lenin: An Intellectual Biography | Monthly Review | 'Deutscher, Lenin and the East-European Perspectives: On the History of the Theory of Socialism' |
| 2016 | Andreas Malm | Fossil Capital: The Rise of Steam Power and the Roots of Global Warming | Verso | 'In Wildness Is the Liberation of the World: On Maroon Ecology and Partisan Nature' |
| 2017 | William Clare Roberts | Marx's Inferno: The Political Theory of Capital | Princeton University Press | 'Marx’s Social Republic: Political not Metaphysical' |
| 2018 | Kohei Saito | Karl Marx's Ecosocialism: Capital, Nature, and the Unfinished Critique of Political Economy | Monthly Review | 'Marx’s Theory of Metabolism in the Age of Global Ecological Crisis' |
| 2019 | Brett Christophers | The New Enclosure: The Appropriation of Public Land in Neoliberal Britain | Verso | 'Class, Assets and Work in Rentier Capitalism' |
| 2020 | John Bellamy Foster | The Return of Nature: Socialism and Ecology | Monthly Review | 'The Return of the Dialectics of Nature: The Struggle for Freedom as Necessity' |
| 2021 | Ronald Grigor Suny | Stalin: Passage to Revolution | Princeton University Press | 'Was Stalin a Marxist? And If He Was, What Does This Mean for Marxism?' |
| 2022 | Gabriel Winant | The Next Shift: The Fall of Industry and the Rise of Health Care in Rust Belt America | Harvard University Press | 'The Baby and the Bathwater: Class Analysis and Class Formation after Deindustrialisation' |
| 2023 | Heide Gerstenberger | Market and Violence: The Functioning of Capitalism in History | Brill | 'On the Political Economy of Maritime Labour' |
| 2024 | Matteo Pasquinelli | The Eye of the Master: A Social History of Artificial Intelligence | Verso | 'Vectors For Workers: Models of Automation and Autonomy in the Long AI Century' |
| 2025 | Bruno Leipold | Citizen Marx: Republicanism and the Formation of Karl Marx’s Social and Political Thought | Princeton University Press | |

Shortlists for each year can be found on the Deutscher Prize website.
