= Tom Bramble =

Australian socialist activist, author, and academic

Tom Bramble is a socialist activist, author, and retired academic based in Queensland, Australia. He taught industrial relations at the University of Queensland for many years and has authored numerous books and articles on the Australian labour movement. He is a member of Socialist Alternative.

== Political history ==
Bramble has been politically active since the late 1970s, initially in Britain and, from the mid-1980s, in Australia. He was a trade unionist throughout his working life and was made a Life Member of the National Tertiary Education Union on his retirement. He is a member of the National Executive of the Trotskyist organisation, Socialist Alternative (SA) and is a regular contributor to SA's publications, including Red Flag and the Marxist Left Review.

== Academic history ==
Bramble taught Industrial Relations at the University of Queensland from 1993 until his retirement in 2015. He holds a PhD from La Trobe University in the same field, a Master of Commerce (Hons) from the University of New South Wales, and won the university medal in Economics from the University of Cambridge when he graduated with his BA (Honours) in 1982.

== Publication history ==
In 2021, Bramble co-authored (with Mick Armstrong) the book The Fight for Workers' Power: Revolution and Counter-Revolution in the 20th Century. This is published by Interventions (Melbourne). Donny Gluckstein, Lecturer in History at Edinburgh College, said of the book: "This work combines a remarkable number of features. It is vast in scope but judiciously focusses on key moments of workers’ struggle between 1917 and 1956. Full of fascinating information and detail, it is never a detached academic history but is a guide to activists today, both in terms of theory and practice. By focussing on workers self-activity in combination with Marxist theory the authors steer clear of the traps of Stalinism and reformism, remaining true to the essence of revolutionary socialism. In the midst of all that they still manage to present debates around important political questions. This book should be of interest to readers worldwide, though the three chapters on Australia will give it special value there."

In 2015, Socialist Alternative published Bramble's book Introducing Marxism: A theory of social change which provides an introduction to the basics of Marxist politics for those new to the area. In the years following its publication, with several thousand copies sold, Introducing Marxism had become the best-selling book on Marxism published in Australia for several decades. In 2024, Red Flag Books published a second edition, titled Introducing Marxism: A theory of revolutionary change.

In 2010 Cambridge University Press published Bramble's book (with Rick Kuhn) Labor's Conflict: Big Business, Workers and the Politics of Class which traced the history of the Australian Labor Party (ALP) from its formation through to the Gillard Government from a Marxist perspective. Australian National University academic Norman Abjorensen described it as "A veritable tour de force. Not since Vere Gordon Childe's How Labour Governs, published nearly 90 years ago, has the ALP been subjected to such a searching analysis".

In 2008 Bramble authored the book also published by Cambridge University Press: Trade Unionism in Australia: A History from Flood to Ebb Tide, a controversial Marxist analysis of the Australian labour movement, attacking the trade union bureaucracy and the ALP. John Pilger said of the book: "Bramble has written an important and fluent reminder that nothing is gained without a fight. An essential read."

In 2003 Bramble co-edited the book published by Ashgate Publishing: Rethinking the Labour Movement in the 'New South Africa' with Franco Barchiesi from the University of Bologna, which analysed the South African labour movement's reaction to the African National Congress post-apartheid. Patrick Bond of the University of the Witwatersrand said of the work: "Bramble and Barchiesi have gathered the toughest contemporary critiques and auto-critiques of the South African labour movement... in a manner that no scholar or activist interested in post-apartheid political economy dare ignore." Ben Fine of the University of London's School of Oriental and African Studies called it "the single most important contribution to an understanding of the trajectory of the South African labour movement."

Bramble also edited the memoirs of Jock Barnes, the New Zealand trade unionist and has published many articles on the union movements in Australia, New Zealand and South Korea and global political economy.

== Selected books ==
- Introducing Marxism: A theory of revolutionary change, 2nd edition, Red Flag Books, Melbourne, 2024 [1st edition, 2015].
- The Labor Party: A Marxist analysis, 2nd edition (with Mick Armstrong), Red Flag Books, Melbourne, 2023 [1st edition, 2007].
- The Fight for Workers' Power: Revolution and Counter-Revolution in the 20th Century (with Mick Armstrong), Interventions, Melbourne, 2021.
- Labor's Conflict: Big Business, Workers and the Politics of Class (with Rick Kuhn), Cambridge University Press, Melbourne, 2010.
- Trade Unionism in Australia: A History from Flood to Ebb Tide, Cambridge University Press, Melbourne, 2008.
- Rethinking the Labour Movement in the 'New South Africa' (edited with Franco Barchiesi), Ashgate, Aldershot, 2003.
- Never a White Flag: The Memoirs of Jock Barnes, (edited) Victoria University Press, Wellington, 1998.

== Selected articles ==
- AUKUS and the US alliance: Australian imperialism in the Indo-Pacific, Marxist Left Review, issue 23, Summer 2022.
- Biden's plan for the US Empire, Marxist Left Review, issue 22, Winter 2021.
- Is the world economy on the verge of a new recession?, Marxist Left Review, issue 19, Summer 2020.
- The 2019 federal election: Why did Labor lose and what next?, Marxist Left Review, issue 18, Winter 2019.
- Police state: The politics of law and order, Marxist Left Review issue 17, Summer 2019.
- The crisis in neoliberalism and its ramifications, Marxist Left Review, issue 16, Winter 2018.
- The Trump presidency, US imperialism and the future of the neoliberal order, Marxist Left Review, issue 16, Winter 2018.
- Our unions in crisis: how did it come to this?, Marxist Left Review, issue 15, Summer 2018.
- British Labour, Australian Labor: splits and insurgencies, Marxist Left Review, issue 13, Summer 2017.
- Australian capitalism in the neoliberal age, Marxist Left Review, issue 7, Summer 2014.
- Is there a labour aristocracy in Australia?, Marxist Left Review, issue 4, Winter 2012.
- Australian imperialism and the rise of China, Marxist Left Review, issue 3, Spring 2011.
- Does the Australian working class have the power to change society?, Marxist Left Review, issue 2, Autumn 2011.
- Whose Streets? Our Streets! Activist Perspectives on the Australian Anti-Capitalist Movement, (with John Minns) Social Movement Studies, 2004.
- War on the Waterfront, Brisbane Defend Our Unions Committee, October 1998.
