= Alfredo Saad-Filho =

Brazilian Marxian economist

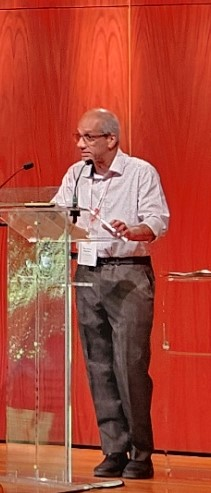
Image of Alfredo Saad-Filho

Alfredo Saad-Filho is a Brazilian Marxian economist.

== Education and career ==
Alfredo Saad-Filho has degrees in Economics from the University of Brasília (Brazil) and the University of London (SOAS). He is currently Professor of International Relations at Queen's University Belfast. He was Professor of Political Economy at SOAS University of London between 2000 and 2019, Chair of the SOAS Department of Development Studies (2006–10), Head of the SOAS Doctoral School (2018–19), and Chair of Department of International Development at King's College London (2021–22).

Saad-Filho was Senior Economic Affairs Officer at the United Nations Conference on Trade and Development (UNCTAD), in Geneva, in 2011-2012, and he has taught in universities and research institutions in Belgium, Brazil, Canada, China, Germany, Italy, Japan, Mozambique, Switzerland, and the UK. He was awarded the Lifetime Achievement Medal of the Federal University of Goiás, Brazil, in 2014, and the SOAS Director’s Teaching Prize, in 2016. His research interests include the political economy of development, industrial policy, neoliberalism, democracy, alternative economic policies, Latin American political and economic development, inflation and stabilisation, and the labour theory of value and its applications. Alfredo Saad Filho was a Commonwealth Scholarship Commissioner (2018–22), among many other roles.

Saad-Filho is a member of the Deutscher Memorial Prize Committee, an associate editor of the Socialist Register, and a member of the editorial board of the Brazilian Journal of Political Economy, and the South Korean journal Marxism 21. He is also a participating editor of Latin American Perspectives, a member of the advisory board of Historical Materialism, and a member of the international editorial board of Studies in Political Economy, among many other journals.

== Publications ==
Books

- Progressive Policies for Economic Development: Economic Diversification and Social Inclusion after Climate Change. London: Routledge, 2022.
- The Age of Crisis: Neoliberalism, the Collapse of Democracy, and the Pandemic. London: Palgrave Macmillan, 2022.
- Growth and Change in Neoliberal Capitalism: Essays on the Political Economy of Late Development, Leiden: Brill, 2020.
- Value and Crisis: Essays on Labour, Money and Contemporary Capitalism, Leiden: Brill, 2019.
- Brazil: Neoliberalism versus Democracy. London: Pluto Press, 2018 (with L. Morais).
- Economic Policies for Growth, Employment and Poverty Reduction: Case Study of Zambia. Lusaka: UNDP, 2007 (with V. Chisala, H. Dagdeviren, A. Geda, T. McKinley, C. Oya and J. Weeks).]
- Marx’s Capital. London: Pluto Press, 2004, 2010, 2016 (with Ben Fine).
- The Value of Marx: Political Economy for Contemporary Capitalism. London: Routledge, 2002.

Edited Books

- From Value to Uneven Development: Select Writings by John Weeks. Leiden: Brill, 2024 (ed., with B. Fine and S. Mohun).
- Capital and Politics, Socialist Register 2023. London: Merlin Press, 2023. (ed., with G. Albo and N. Aschoff).
- Neoliberalism or Developmentalism: The PT Governments in the Eye of the Storm. Leiden: Brill, 2022, and Chicago: Haymarket, 2023 (ed., with J. Grigera and A.P. Colombi).
- The Elgar Companion to Marxist Economics. Aldershot: Edward Elgar, 2012 (editor, with Ben Fine).
- Economic Transitions to Neoliberalism in Middle-Income Countries: Policy Dilemmas, Economic Crises, Forms of Resistance. London: Routledge, 2009 (editor, with G. Yalman).
- Political Economy of Brazil: Recent Economic Performance. London: Palgrave Macmillan, 2007 (editor, with P. Arestis).
- Neoliberalism: A Critical Reader. London: Pluto Press, 2005 (editor, with D. Johnston).
- Anti-Capitalism: A Marxist Introduction. London: Pluto Press, 2003 (editor).

Edited Journal Issues

- Authoritarian Developmentalism: The Latest Stage of Neoliberalism, special issue of Geoforum, 2020 (with F. Adaman and M. Arsel).
- The PT Governments in Brazil: Varieties of Neoliberalism, double special issues of Latin American Perspectives, 47 (1) and 47 (2), 2020 (with A. Colombi and J. Grigera).
- Neoliberalism since the Crisis, special issue of Critical Sociology, 43 (4-5) 2016 (with D. Cahill).

Chapters in Books

- Crises in Neoliberalism: Towards a Democratic Alternative, in: T. Brass and R.J. Das (eds) Interrogating the Future. Leiden: Brill, 2024.
- ‘Introduction’, in From Value to Uneven Development: Select Writings by John Weeks. Leiden: Brill, 2024 (ed., with B. Fine and S. Mohun).
- Re-Casting Development Studies in Times of Multiple Crises, in: K. Biekart, L. Camfield, U. Kothari and H. Melber (eds) Challenging Global Development: Towards Decoloniality and Justice. London: Palgrave Macmillan, 2023.
- ‘Development and Postdevelopment in a Time of Crisis, in: K. Biekart, L. Camfield, U. Kothari and H. Melber (eds) Challenging Global Development: Towards Decoloniality and Justice. London: Palgrave Macmillan, 2023.
- Introduction, in: Socialist Register 2023, ‘Capital and Politics’. London: Merlin Press (ed., with G. Albo and N. Aschoff).
- ‘Authoritarian Neoliberalism, Covid-19, and the Future of Democracy’, in: A. Regelmann (ed.), The Crisis and the Future of Democracy, Brussels: Rosa Luxemburg Foundation, 2022 (with M. Boffo).
- ‘Covid-19 and the End of Neoliberalism’, in: A. Topal, O. Birler, C. Celik and A. Goksel (eds.) State Transformation in the 21st Century. Istanbul: Imge Books, 2022.
- ‘Preface’, in A. Boito, State, Politics and Social Classes, London: Palgrave Macmillan, 2022.
- ‘Neoliberalism, Democracy, Authoritarianism and Resistance’, in: C.F.B. Reis and T. Berringer (eds.) South-North Dialogues on Democracy, Development and Sustainability. London: Routledge, 2022.
- ‘Shades of Neoliberalism: Brazil under the Workers’ Party (2003-2020)’, in A. Saad-Filho, A.P. Colombi and J. Grigera (eds.) Neoliberalism or Developmentalism: The Worker's Party Governments in the Eye of the Storm. Leiden: Brill, 2022, and Chicago: Haymarket, 2023.
- ‘Value, Capital and Exploitation in Marx’, in: D. Fasenfest (ed.) Marx Matters. Leiden: Brill, 2022.
- ‘Brazilian Democracy Facing Authoritarian Neoliberalism’, in: M. Williams and V. Satgar (eds.) Destroying Democracy: Neoliberal Capitalism and the Rise of Authoritarian Politics. Johannesburg: Wits University Press, 2021.
- ‘Preface’, in: L.F de Paula, Financial Liberalization and Economic Performance: The Brazilian Economy at the Crossroads. Rio de Janeiro: Editora UFRJ, 2021.
- ‘Foreword’, in: Controversies about History, Development and Revolution in Brazil. Leiden: Brill, 2022.
- ‘Neoliberalism and the Covid-19 Pandemic: A Political Economy Analysis’, Scientific Works of the Free Economic Society of Russia, vol.223, 2020, pp.565-572.
- ‘Neoliberal Capitalism: The Authoritarian Turn’, in: L. Panitch and G. Albo (eds.) Socialist Register. London: Merlin Press 2019 (with M. Boffo and B. Fine).
