= Robin Blackburn =

British historian and former editor of New Left Review

- Born: 1940 (age 85–86)
- Education: Hurstpierpoint College; Oxford University; London School of Economics
- Occupation: Historian
- Known for: Former editor of New Left Review (1983–1999)
- Movement: New Left
- Awards: Deutscher Memorial Prize

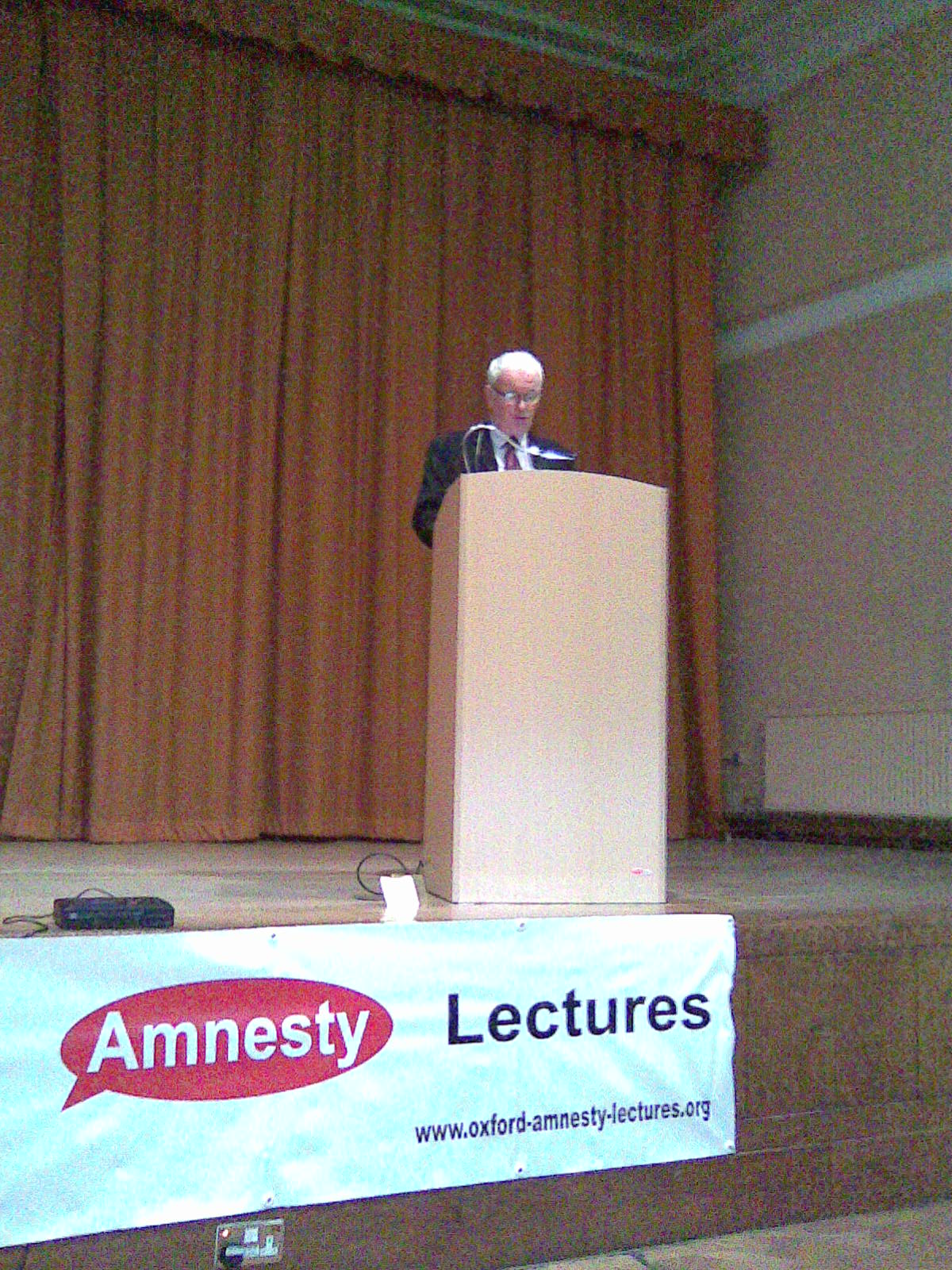
Blackburn in 2010

Robin Blackburn (born 1940) is a British historian, a former editor of New Left Review (1983–1999), and emeritus professor in the department of sociology at Essex University.

== Background ==
Blackburn was educated at Hurstpierpoint College, Oxford University and the London School of Economics. Between 2001 and 2010, he was distinguished visiting professor of historical studies at The New School in New York City. He is an emeritus professor in the department of sociology at Essex University. He has been a regular contributor to New Left Review since 1962, and he was the journal editor from 1983 to 1999.

Blackburn has written essays on the collapse of Soviet Communism, on the "credit crunch" of 2008, and of books on the history of slavery and on social policy. Four of his books—The Reckoning: From the Second Slavery to Abolition, 1776–1888 (2024), American Crucible: Slavery, Emancipation and Human Rights (2011), The Making of New World Slavery: From the Baroque to the Modern, 1492–1800 (1997) and The Overthrow of Colonial Slavery, 1776–1848 (1988)—offer an account of the rise and fall of colonial slavery in the Americas, contributing to the emerging field of "Atlantic history". He has also published histories of Social Security, and critiques of the "financialisation of everyday life" and of the privatisation of pension provision.

In 1997, he was awarded the Deutscher Memorial Prize for his book The Making of New World Slavery: From the Baroque to the Modern, 1492–1800.

== Selected works/articles ==
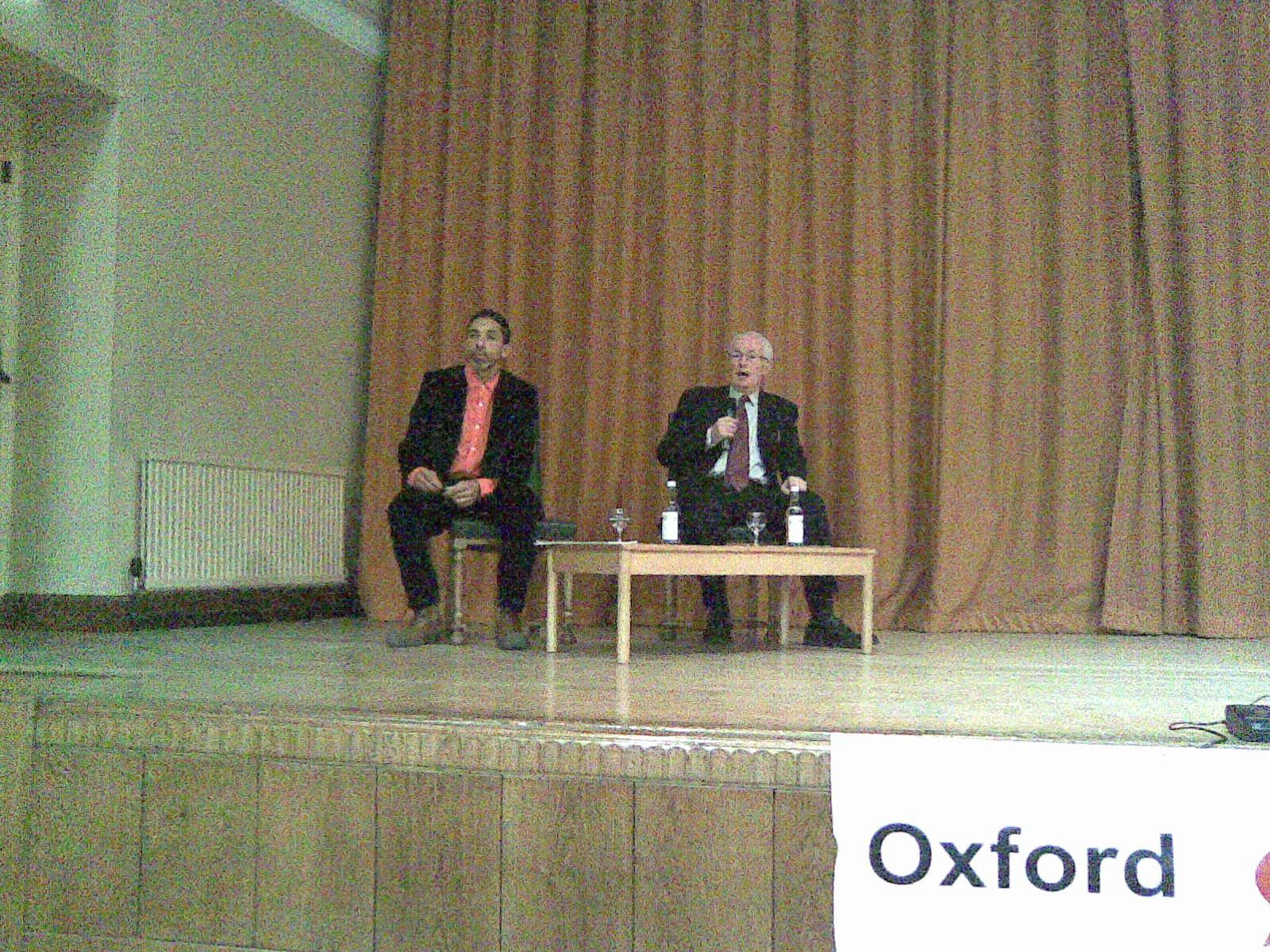
Blackburn (right) after giving an Oxford Amnesty Lecture, with Robin Kelley (left), who chaired the event, 2010

- "Prologue to the Cuban Revolution". New Left Review. I (21). October 1963.
- Towards Socialism, edited for the New Left Review (with Perry Anderson, 1966).
- The Incompatibles: Trade Union Militancy and the Consensus (with Alexander Cockburn, 1967).
- "Inequality and exploitation". New Left Review. I (42). March–April 1967.
- Student Power: problems, diagnosis, action (edited with Alexander Cockburn, 1969).
- Strategy for revolution [essays by Régis Debray, translated from the French] (editor, 1970).
- Ideology in Social Science: Readings in Critical Social Theory (editor, 1972).
- Explosion in a Subcontinent: India, Pakistan, Bangladesh, and Ceylon (editor, 1975).
- Revolution and Class Struggle: A Reader in Marxist Politics (editor, 1977).
- The Overthrow of Colonial Slavery, 1776–1848 (1988), 550 pp.
- "Fin de Siecle", in After the Fall: The Failure of Communism and the Future of Socialism (editor, 1991).
- The Making of New World Slavery: From the Baroque to the Modern, 1492–1800 (1997), 600 pp.
- Banking on Death: Or, Investing in Life — The History and Future of Pensions (2002), 500 pp.
- "Haiti, Slavery and the Age of the Democratic Revolution", William and Mary Quarterly, 2006.
- Age Shock: How Finance Is Failing Us (2006), 280 pp.
- "Economic Democracy: Meaningful, Desirable, Feasible?", Daedalus, Summer 2007.
- "Plan for a global pension". New Left Review. II (47). September–October 2007.
- "The subprime crisis". New Left Review. II (50). March–April 2008.
- The American Crucible: Slavery, Emancipation and Human Rights (2011), 460 pp.
- Marx and Lincoln: An Unfinished Revolution (2011), 220 pp.
- "Alexander Cockburn 1941–2012". New Left Review. II (76). July–August 2012.
- "Gunboat Abolitionism", New Left Review. II (79). May–June 2013.
- "Stuart Hall 1932–2014", New Left Review. II (86). March–April 2014.
- The Reckoning: From the Second Slavery to Abolition, 1776–1888 (2024), 544 pp.

Awards
Preceded by Donald Sassoon	Deutscher Memorial Prize; 1997	Vacant Title next held by Francis Wheen
