= Kees van der Pijl =

Dutch political scientist

- Born: 1947 (age 78–79); Dordrecht, Netherlands
- Citizenship: Dutch
- Education: University of Amsterdam
- Scientific career
- Fields: Global Political Economy, International Relations
- Workplaces: University of Sussex

Kees van der Pijl (born 15 June 1947) is a Dutch political scientist who was professor of international relations at the University of Sussex. He is known for his critical approach to global political economy and has published, amongst others, Flight MH17, Ukraine and the New Cold War. Prism of Disaster (2018), a trilogy on Modes of Foreign Relations and Political Economy (2007, 2010, 2014); Global Rivalries from the Cold War to Iraq (2006); Transnational Classes and International Relations (1998); and The Making of an Atlantic Ruling Class (1984, reprinted 2012). He resigned from his emeritus status at Sussex in 2019 after refusing to apologise for allegations that the Israelis were responsible for the September 11 attacks.

== Biography ==
Kees van der Pijl studied law at Leiden University from 1965 to 1967. After military service as a reserve officer in the Royal Dutch Military Police, and a trip through the Soviet Union to Japan in 1970, he switched to political science, a specialisation taught in Leiden as part of the public law degree. His most influential teachers were Hans Daalder, Ben Sijes, and the Indologist, J.C. Heesterman, with whom he wrote his final thesis on the politics of regional diversity in India. He graduated in 1973 and was hired as a junior lecturer by the Department of International Relations at the University of Amsterdam in that year. In 1983 he received his doctorate at the University of Amsterdam on a thesis titled Imperialism and Class Formation in the North Atlantic Area, supervised by Gerd Junne. He was involved in the Communist Party of the Netherlands (CPN) and also published short stories and three novels (1989, 1992, 1994, all with De Harmonie). Van der Pijl was co-director of the Research Centre for International Political Economy (Recipe) from 1992 to 1998. With Henk Overbeek, Ries Bode, Otto Holman, Bastiaan van Apeldoorn and others, this created a tentative Amsterdam School of global political economy.

In 2000, Van der Pijl moved to the United Kingdom to take up the chair in international relations at the University of Sussex, vacant after the retirement of Professor Michael Nicholson. He was appointed director of the Centre for Global Political Economy (CGPE) at that university when it was launched in 2001 (until 2006), and was subject chair/head of the Department of Politics and International Relations from 2002 to 2004. In 2006 he was awarded a Leverhulme Major Research Fellowship. He taught as a visiting professor at the University of Auvergne at Clermont-Ferrand (2005, 2006) and at L’Orientale University in Naples (2009, 2010). His work was nominated for prizes in 2007 and 2008 and he was awarded the Deutscher Memorial Prize in 2008 for Nomads, Empires, States (Pluto 2007).

He retired from Sussex in 2012.

== Research ==
Kees van der Pijl's published work from 1984 to 2014 covers four main areas: a) transnational classes; b) the structure of the global political economy; c) the history of ideas in International Relations and Global Political Economy; d) modes of foreign relations.

=== Transnational classes ===
The study of transnational class formation was central in the work at the University of Amsterdam. It built on the writings of Christian Palloix, Nikos Poulantzas, Alfred Sohn-Rethel and on the materialist Cold War history in the United States (Joyce and Gabriel Kolko). Van der Pijl's contribution was on the transmission of American mass production to Western Europe in the Marshall Plan and the relegation of the cartelised European steel industry to the role of a supplier for the automobile industry, resulting in a first book in Dutch (1978). Economic statesmen involved in this process weld their different 'fractional' perspectives (heavy/light industrial, national/international trade, investment and commercial banking, etc.) into 'globale beheersconcepties' (comprehensive concepts of control, a notion coined by Ries Bode). A concept of control projects a presumed general interest totalising all others, under the guidance of the dominant fraction. In his doctoral dissertation of 1983 and the book based on it (The Making of an Atlantic Ruling Class, Verso 1984, reprinted with a new preface 2012), Van der Pijl applied this to the evolution of transatlantic class formation. In Transnational Classes and International Relations (Routledge 1998), neoliberalism is identified as the hegemonic concept of control in the closing decades of the 20th century. This book also analyses the managerial 'cadre', an auxiliary class of salaried functionaries with directive-educative roles. The cadre typically come to the fore in major crises (the 1930s, the 1970s, and again today), proposing managerial alternatives to liberalism. If not checked by popular mobilisation, their intervention may assume authoritarian forms.

=== Structure of the global political economy ===
Challenging the state-centric understanding of world politics, which assumes that each state contains a self-enclosed society, van der Pijl distinguishes a Lockean heartland (after John Locke, the ideologue of the 1688 Glorious Revolution in England) at the centre of the global political economy. This is composed of the white-majority, English-speaking countries. Its common law tradition favouring social self-regulation and distrust of state encroachment, ideology of possessive individualism, and missionary interpretation of its role in the world (inspired by Puritanism) have fostered the development of capitalist social relations. The Lockean heartland has interacted with rival states seeking to impose themselves on their societies, to balance and withstand the influence of the liberal West and avoid colonisation. These contender states, of which France in the long 18th century, Germany, Japan and Italy from the late 19th to the mid-20th centuries, and the Soviet Union after World War II, have been the most important ones, develop through revolutions from above (Gramsci's ‘passive revolution’) into alternatives to transnational Western liberalism. This line of analysis, developed in Transnational Classes and International Relations and more recently in Global Rivalries from the Cold War to Iraq (Pluto and Sage-Vistaar 2006, Turkish trans., Imge 2014) leads to the identification of China as the current primary contender.

=== History of international thought ===
Building on the concepts of the Anglophone Lockean heartland and the contender states, Van der Pijl in Vordenker der Weltpolitik (Leske+Budrich 1996, revised from an earlier work in Dutch) argued that the liberal West typically produced 'idealist' conceptions of world order, against the 'realist' power politics perspective of the contenders. After World War I, there was an exodus of such 'realists' from the European continent to the United States, incorporating the realist argument into the IR mainstream. In volumes II and III of his Modes of foreign relations project, Van der Pijl discusses what myth and religion say about foreign relations, and how liberalism prescribes the nation-state form for the world. The third volume, The Discipline of Western Supremacy (2014) presents a historical sociology of the IR discipline in this light.

=== Modes of foreign relations ===
In the Modes of foreign relations project, sponsored by the Leverhulme Trust under a major research fellowship 2006–2009, Van der Pijl develops the argument that inter-state relations (as well as the national state form itself) are transient, historical forms of more fundamental foreign relations. Just as Marx developed a critique of equilibrium economics by claiming that this was only one ‘mode of production’, which had been preceded and would be followed by others, Van der Pijl in this project challenged the 'IR' paradigm. Modes of foreign relations include a tribal, an empire/nomad, the sovereign equality, and the global governance modes; in each, a specific way occupation of space, its protection, and the exchange with others, are made possible by a given level of civilisation.

== Controversies ==
In 2018, Van der Pijl said that Israelis brought down the Twin Towers during the 9/11 attacks "with help from Zionists in the US government", leading to condemnation by Jewish groups and others. The University of Sussex started a procedure to investigate accusations of antisemitism, asking that Van der Pijl make "a public apology on social media, acknowledging the hurt that your actions have caused and distancing yourself formally from anti-Semitism in any form" and remove the tweet which started the row. Van der Pijl refused to do so and decided to resign from his emeritus status on 14 March 2019.

In 2018, van der Pijl published the book Flight MH17, Ukraine and the New Cold War, in which he blamed Ukraine and the West for shooting down Malaysia Airlines Flight 17 in July 2014 over eastern Ukraine. In a review of the book, scholar Taras Kuzio wrote "van der Pijl uses conspiracy theories taken from Russian information warfare and social media, such as Russia Today, to promote his claim that MH17 was brought down by a Ukrainian-Western conspiracy".

== Interviews and text resources ==
- A Survey of Global Political Economy (web textbook)
- Global Rivalries Today: An Interview with Kees Van Der Pijl (Transform Network)
- "Foundations of Social Change: An Interview with Kees Van Der Pijl" (New Left Project)
- Kees van der Pijl on the Demise of Left-Wing Parties in Europe, Empires and the Current Value of Marx (Interview on Theory Talks)
- Modes of Foreign Relations vs Uneven and Combined Development: The Marxist Legacy and Relations between and within Alienated Societies (review article by Örsan Şenalp)
- "Interview with Kees Van der Pijl (The Current Moment)

=== Videos ===
- On the State of the World Today: New Cold War and the Rise of Right Wing Populism, BITS Symposium, December 2016 Video on YouTube
- Interview on the book 'Nomads, Empires, States' at Nottingham University on YouTube
- 'Economic Crisis, Marxian Alternatives and the Future of European Economy' – Glasgow Caledonian University on YouTube

Awards
Preceded by Rick Kuhn	Deutscher Memorial Prize; 2008	Succeeded by Dimitris Milonakis and Ben Fine
