= Francis Wheen =

British journalist and broadcaster (born 1957)

- Born: 22 January 1957 (age 69)
- Education: Royal Holloway College, University of London
- Occupations: Journalist, writer and broadcaster
- Spouse(s): Joan Smith (m. 1985; div. 1993) Julia Jones (m. 2019)
- Children: 2 sons
- Awards: Orwell Prize

Francis James Baird Wheen (born 22 January 1957) is a British journalist, writer and broadcaster.

== Early life and education ==
Wheen was born into an army family and educated at two independent schools: Copthorne Preparatory School near Crawley, West Sussex, and Harrow School in north-west London. At Harrow, he was briefly a contemporary of Mark Thatcher, who has been a subject of his journalism.

== Career ==
External videos
- Booknotes interview with Wheen on Karl Marx: A Life, 25 June 2000, C-SPAN

Running away from Harrow at 16 "to join the alternative society," Wheen had early periods as a "dogsbody" at The Guardian and the New Statesman, before attending Royal Holloway College, University of London, following a period spent at a crammer.

Wheen is the author of several books, including a biography of Karl Marx which won the Deutscher Memorial Prize in 1999, and has been translated into twenty languages. He followed this with a notional "biography" of Das Kapital, which follows the creation and publication of the first volume of Marx's major work as well as other incomplete volumes. Wheen had a column in The Guardian for several years. He wrote for Private Eye and became the magazine's deputy editor. He retired from Private Eye in October 2022, though he still occasionally contributes.

His collected journalism, Hoo-hahs and Passing Frenzies, won him the Orwell Prize in 2003. He has also been a regular columnist for the London Evening Standard.

In April 2012, Wheen suffered the loss of his entire book collection, his "life's work", and an unfinished novel, in a garden shed fire.

=== Broadcasting work ===
Wheen broadcasts regularly, mainly on BBC Radio 4, has made many appearances on The News Quiz, in which he has often referred to the fact that he resembles the former Conservative Party leader Iain Duncan Smith. He has also several times been a guest on Have I Got News for You.

Wheen wrote a docudrama, The Lavender List, for BBC Four on the final period of Harold Wilson's premiership, concentrating on his relationship with Marcia Williams. First screened in March 2006, it starred Kenneth Cranham as Wilson and Gina McKee as Williams. In April 2007, the BBC paid £75,000 to Williams (then Baroness Falkender) in an out-of-court settlement over claims made in the programme.

== Political views ==
Wheen was opposed to the Falklands War. In an article syndicated to a number of American newspapers, Wheen stated: "In a famous British play of the 1950s, Look Back in Anger, the hero complained that 'there aren't any good, brave causes to fight for anymore'. Mrs Thatcher apparently agrees with this view, so she went to war over a small, ignoble cause." Wheen is a supporter of the anti-monarchist group Republic.

Wheen supported NATO's Kosovo intervention in 1999, signed the Euston Manifesto for a realignment of progressive politics, and supported the Iraq War.

In late 2005, Wheen was the co-author with David Aaronovitch and blogger Oliver Kamm, both contributors to The Times, of a complaint to The Guardian after it published an apology and correction in respect of an interview with Noam Chomsky by Emma Brockes which had been published at the end of October 2005; Chomsky had complained that the interview was defamatory in suggesting that he denied the 1995 Srebrenica massacre by his defence of a book by Diana Johnstone.

Wheen was intensely critical of Foreign Office minister Baroness Anelay's failure to condemn the torture of Raif Badawi by the government of Saudi Arabia in 2016. Wheen maintained that Anelay's approach was motivated by her wish to sell arms to the Saudi régime.

== Personal life ==
Wheen was married to the writer Joan Smith between 1985 and 1993. He has been the partner since the mid-1990s of Julia Jones (formerly Julia Thorogood), whom he married in 2019; they have two sons.

In 2014, Wheen waived his right to anonymity in order to speak about being a victim of Charles Napier, one-time treasurer of the defunct Paedophile Information Exchange, after the former teacher was convicted of sexually abusing 23 boys between 1967 and 1983. Wheen described his experience as less serious than that of other victims, and had only become aware of the scale of Napier's activities later.

Wheen was a close friend of the writer Christopher Hitchens.

== Partial bibliography ==
- The Sixties (1982) ISBN 0-7126-0018-3
- Television: A History (1984) ISBN 0-7126-0929-6
- Battle for London (1985) ISBN 0-7453-0054-5
- Tom Driberg: His Life and Indiscretions (1990) ISBN 0-7011-3143-8
- The Chatto Book of Cats (Chatto Anthologies) Francis Wheen, editor, John O'Connor, illustrator (1993) ISBN 0-7011-4005-4
- Lord Gnome's Literary Companion (1994) ISBN 1-85984-945-8
- Karl Marx (1999) ISBN 1-85702-637-3
- Who Was Dr. Charlotte Bach? (2002) ISBN 1-904095-39-9
- Hoo-hahs and Passing Frenzies: Collected Journalism, 1991–2001 (2002) ISBN 1-903809-42-8 (mainly consisting of columns written for The Guardian)
- The Irresistible Con: The Bizarre Life of a Fraudulent Genius (2004) ISBN 1-904095-74-7
- Shooting Out the Lights (2004) ISBN 0-00-714943-3
- How Mumbo-Jumbo Conquered the World (2004) ISBN 0-00-714096-7; in the US and Canada: Idiot Proof: A Short History of Modern Delusions (2004) ISBN 1-58648-247-5
- Marx's Das Kapital: A Biography (2006) ISBN 978-1-84354-400-5
- Strange Days Indeed: The Golden Age of Paranoia (2009) ISBN 978-0-00-724427-0

Awards
Vacant Title last held by Robin Blackburn	Deutscher Memorial Prize; 1999	Succeeded by Peter Gowan
