= Tom O'Lincoln =

Australian historian (1947–2023)

- Born: 27 August 1947; Walnut Creek, California, United States
- Died: 12 October 2023 (aged 76); Melbourne, Victoria, Australia
- Education: University of California, Berkeley
- Occupation: Historian
- Known for: Australian labor history
- Political party: Socialist Alternative; Victorian Socialists

Tom O'Lincoln (27 August 1947 − 12 October 2023) was an American-Australian Marxist historian and author, and one of the founders of the International Socialist Tendency in Australia.

== Early life and education ==
O'Lincoln was born in Walnut Creek, California on 27 August 1947. He attended the Univerity of California at Berkeley in 1966 and joined the International Socialists who had participated in the Free Speech Movement two years earlier. While at Berkeley, he went on study abroad to Germany.

== Career ==
In 1971 he moved to Australia from San Francisco. He began teaching at Maribrynong High School and joined the Victorian Secondary Teachers' Association.

He wrote first-hand accounts of the Carnation Revolution in Portugal, the Sandinistas in Nicaragua, the Philippines after the downfall of Ferdinand Marcos, the USSR under Mikhail Gorbachev, and the upheavals against Suharto in Indonesia.

He was a member of the Trotskyist organisation Socialist Alternative, as well as its electoral alliance party Victorian Socialists, and an editor of the online journal Marxist Interventions.

== Critical reception ==
Of the book Class and Class Conflict in Australia, which O'Lincoln co-edited with Rick Kuhn, Social Alternatives said "This able collection of writers has put class, alongside gender and ethnicity, out front, as a vital tool of social analysis [...] criticisms are minor in the scale of satisfying and informative reading. For this book, written by academics, activists and journalists, lacks academic pomposity whilst maintaining a high degree of scholarship."

Of the book, United We Stand: Class Struggle in Colonial Australia, Austraian Historical Studies said "This slim book... offers a partisan but provocative and highly readable interpretation of class relations in nineteenth-century Australia [...] O'Lincoln does not shy away from using class as a methodological tool or extrapo lating from the past lessons for the present."

Of his book, Australia's Pacific War: Challenging a National Myth, The Conversation said: "Tom O’Lincoln’s important new book Australia’s Pacific War: Challenging a National Myth stands in the grand tradition of debunking pervasive myths [...] This is a book that challenges all our preconceptions about the war in the Pacific. Read it."

== Death ==
O'Lincoln died on 12 October 2023 in Melbourne after a long battle with Parkinson's disease. He was 76.

== Bibliography ==
=== Books ===
- Into the Mainstream: The Decline of Australian Communism, Stained Wattle Press, Sydney 1985.
- Years of Rage: Social Conflicts in the Fraser Era, Bookmarks Australia, Melbourne, 1993.
- Class and Class Conflict in Australia, (Co-editor with Rick Kuhn) Longman Australia, Melbourne, 1996.
- United We Stand: Class Struggle in Colonial Australia, Red Rag, Melbourne, 2005.
- Rebel Women in Australian Working Class History, (Co-editor with Sandra Bloodworth), Red Rag, Melbourne, 2008.
- Australia's Pacific War: Challenging a National Myth, Interventions, Melbourne, 2011.
- Neighbour from Hell, Interventions, Melbourne, 2014.
- The Highway is for Gamblers: A Political Memoir, with Janey Stone, Interventions. Melbourne, 2017.

=== Articles ===
- Why there's nothing good about Australian nationalism, Socialist Alternative, Edition 124, January 2008.
- "'Kill or be killed'". Overland. 194: 64–72. Autumn 2009.
- O'Lincoln, Tom (2009). "Whose liberty? Australian imperialism and the Pacific war". Marxist Interventions (1): 83–105 – via ANU Open Research Repository.
