= Peter Gowan =

Scottish professor, activist, and author

- Born: 15 January 1946; Glasgow, UK
- Died: 12 June 2009 (aged 63)

Academic background
- Education: Southampton University

Academic work
- Institutions: London Metropolitan University
- Main interests: International relations

Peter Gowan (15 January 1946, Glasgow – 12 June 2009) was a professor of international relations at London Metropolitan University, activist, published author and public speaker. He was a member of the editorial committee of New Left Review and was one of the founders of Labour Focus on Eastern Europe.

== Biography ==
Along with his older sister and his mother Gowan moved to Belfast in April 1946 and lived there until he was nine. He never knew his father.

He went to school at Princess Gardens in Belfast until he was seven and then to Brackenburgh House. When he was nine his mother moved to London to work and he went to prep school in Suffolk, Orwell Park, ultimately becoming head boy. He left there to go to Haileybury and Imperial Service College, in Hertfordshire when he was 13, in 1959 and from there went on to read politics and history at Southampton University.

Gowan was diagnosed with his fatal illness only a couple of weeks into the 2008 financial crisis. Despite knowing that his condition was terminal and his health fast-deteriorating, he not only bore it with good humour, but bravely continued to work to the limits of his capacity over the following months: his article "Crisis in the Heartland" for the January–February 2009 issue of New Left Review provides a succinct account of how he interpreted the origins of the 2008 financial crisis. He died at age 63 from the asbestos related disease, peritoneal mesothelioma on 12 June 2009.

== Books ==
- A Calculus of Power: Grand Strategy in the Twenty-First Century (Verso 2010)
- The Search for Order: Historical Reflections on the Crisis of Grand Strategies (Verso 2008)
- The Twisted Road to Kosovo; Introduction (Manifest, Stockholm, 2000)
- The Global Gamble: Washington's Faustian Bid for World Dominance (Verso, 1999)
- Crisis East and West: Must it be Global Barbarism? (Spokesman Books 1997)
- The Question of Europe – Peter Gowan & Perry Anderson (eds) (Verso 1997)
- European Union Policy Towards the Visegrad States (London Metropolitan University 1996)

Awards
Preceded by Francis Wheen	Deutscher Memorial Prize; 2000	Succeeded by James Holstun
