= G. E. M. de Ste. Croix =

British historian of Ancient Greece (1910–2000)

G. E. M. de Ste. Croix FBA
- Born: Geoffrey Ernest Maurice de Ste. Croix; 8 February 1910; Portuguese Macau
- Died: 5 February 2000 (aged 89); Oxford, England
- Spouses: Lucile (m. 1932; div. 1959); Margaret Knight (m. 1959)

Academic background
- Education: University College, London
- Influences: A. H. M. Jones

Academic work
- Discipline: Ancient history
- Institutions: London School of Economics; Birkbeck College; New College, Oxford
- Notable students: Robin Lane Fox; Robert Parker; Nicholas Richardson
- Main interests: Peloponnesian War; Delian League; persecution of Christians in the Roman Empire; historical materialism
- Notable works: The Class Struggle in the Ancient Greek World (1981)

Geoffrey Ernest Maurice de Ste. Croix FBA (/dəseɪntˈkrɔɪ/; 8 February 1910 – 5 February 2000), known informally as Croicks, was a British historian who specialised in examining Ancient Greece from a Marxist perspective. He was Fellow and Tutor in Ancient History at New College, Oxford, from 1953 to 1977, where he taught scholars including Robin Lane Fox, Robert Parker and Nicholas Richardson.

== Early life ==
Ste. Croix (Sainte Croix) was born on 8 February 1910 in Portuguese Macau, and baptised in St John's Cathedral, Hong Kong. His parents were also born in China to British expatriates. His father, Ernest Henry de Ste Croix, who died when he was four, was an official in the Chinese Customs. Their Huguenot ancestors fled to Jersey during the time of Louis XIV. His mother, Florence Annie (née MacGowan), was the daughter of a Protestant missionary: she was a firm believer in British Israelism. Her fundamentalist Protestant beliefs were ever present in his childhood; he would become a firm atheist. According to his own account, he received a "thoroughly right-wing upbringing".

After his father's death in 1914, Florence emigrated with her only child to the United Kingdom. Ste Croix was educated at Clifton College, then an all-boys private school in Bristol, England. There, he became proficient in Greek and Latin, and a talented tennis player. He won the under-16 South of England championship, followed by the West of England Lawn Tennis Doubles in c. 1927 (with captain John Smyth as his partner), and would go on to compete at Wimbledon in 1930, 1931 and 1932. He once defeated Fred Perry in a minor tournament.

== Career ==
=== Legal career ===
He left school at the age of 15 and became an articled clerk in Worthing, West Sussex, England. This allowed him to train for a legal career without a degree in law, and he was admitted as a solicitor in 1932. He practised in Worthing and then in Marylebone in London, until he was called up for war service in 1940.

A militant atheist by 1935, Ste. Croix became interested in socialist politics in reaction to what he saw as the British establishment's failure to oppose the rise of Nazism. He toured the Soviet Union with Intourist for six weeks in 1935 or 1936, reaching the Caucasus. He joined the Labour Party in the St Marylebone ward, serving as the constituency Labour Party secretary and as Labour's election agent in the Metropolitan Borough of St Marylebone council election c. 1937, as well as the secretary of a local Peace Council and Tenants' Defence League. He was also a member or fellow traveller of the Communist Party of Great Britain, but moved away from the party in either 1938 or after the Molotov–Ribbentrop Pact. He withdrew from political activity on relocating to South Kensington in 1939.

=== Military service ===
In late 1940, Ste. Croix was called up for military service in the Second World War. On 18 July 1941, he was commissioned in the Royal Air Force (RAF) as an acting pilot officer (on probation) with seniority from 12 June 1941. He was regraded as a pilot officer (on probation) on 18 September 1941. His commission was confirmed on 18 July 1942, and he was promoted to flying officer on 18 September 1942 with seniority in that rank from 12 August 1942. His job in the RAF was to interpret enemy radar signals to ascertain the location and destination of their aircraft. He served most of the war in the Middle East, stationed at Ismailia, Alexandria, and Cyrenaica: in Egypt he had the opportunity to expand his knowledge of ancient languages, and in Cyrenaica he developed an interest in Greek antiquity. An atheist, he fought for, and was eventually allowed, exemption from the required Sunday services.

=== Academic career ===
In 1946, he was demobilized from the RAF and matriculated into University College, London (UCL), to study ancient history: he preferred London over Oxbridge, because it offered a history course covering c. 3000 BC to the death of Heraclius in AD 641, not classics (with its focus on language and philosophy). His main tutor was A. H. M. Jones, the college's new chair of the Ancient History, who remained an influencing figure on Ste. Croix's work beyond his graduation. He graduated from University College, London with a first-class Bachelor of Arts (BA) degree in 1949. He was awarded a Doctor of Letters (DLitt) degree by the University of Oxford in 1978.

In 1950, Ste. Croix was appointed assistant lecturer in ancient economic history at the London School of Economics. He shared his LSE colleague Karl Popper's distaste for Plato and admiration of Aristotle. He also taught at Birkbeck College and UCL. He struggled to attract students to his courses and was embarrassed to be a lecturer in "a subject which no one was required or wished to study". In 1953, he was elected fellow and tutor in ancient history at New College, Oxford: he lived at Oxford for the rest of his life. Due to a long-standing agreement with C. E. Stevens, he led tutorials in Greek history for classicists from New College and Magdalen College, Oxford. Stevens, in return, taught Roman history. In 1964, he attempted to convince his college to become the first of Oxford's all-male colleges to accept women; he failed, but helped change attitudes through the university. Turning his hand to college administration, he served as Senior Tutor for a number of years. He also held a university lectureship, and gave lecture series in Greek History and topics such as slavery, finance, and food supply. Following the worldwide protests of 1968, he made a submission in support of the students to the 1969 Committee on Relations with Junior Members led by H. L. A. Hart, and elaborated his own revisionist Marxist approach to the role of class in history. He gave the J. H. Gray lectures at the University of Cambridge for the 1972/73 academic year: these lectures developed into The Class Struggle in the Ancient Greek World (1981). He retired from full-time academia in 1977 and was appointed Emeritus Fellow: the college elected him an Honorary Fellow in 1985.

In 1972, Ste. Croix was elected a Fellow of the British Academy (FBA), the United Kingdom's national academy for the humanities and social sciences. He was awarded the Deutscher Memorial Prize for 1982.

== Personal life ==
In 1932, Ste. Croix married Lucile. Together they had one daughter (died 1964). The couple divorced in 1959. That year, he married Margaret Knight. He had two sons from his second marriage.

Ste. Croix died on 5 February 2000 in Oxford, England.

== Work ==
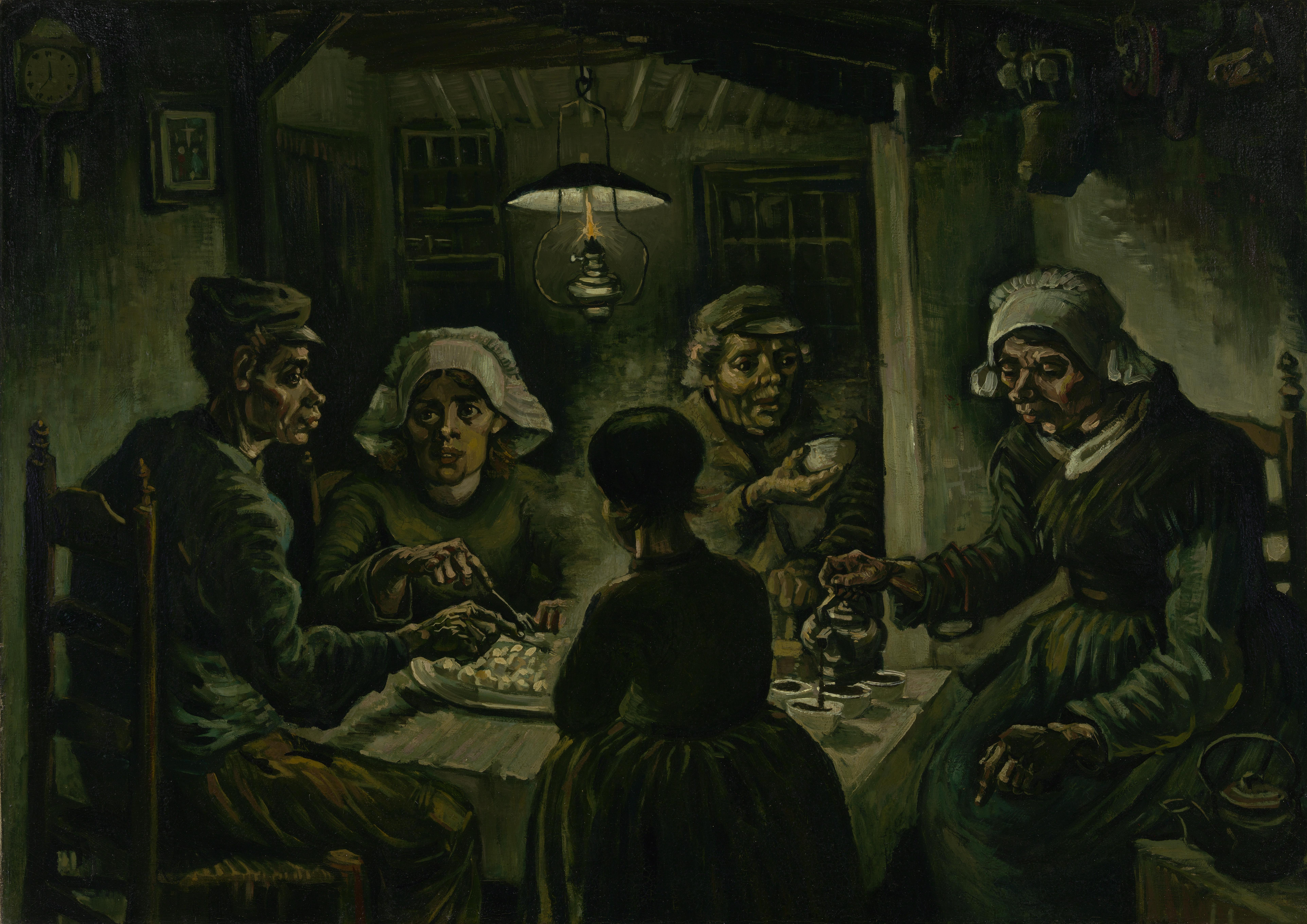
De Ste. Croix used this picture (The Potato Eaters by Van Gogh, 1885) as the frontispiece for his book The Class Struggle in the Ancient Greek World.

Within the circles of classical scholarship, Ste. Croix—as an exponent of a Marxist epistemological approach—was frequently involved in debate with Sir Moses Finley, an advocate of Weberian societal analysis, in particular after the publication of Finley's The Ancient Economy in 1973. The two often exchanged letters and their disagreements were always civil.

Ste. Croix is best known for his books The Origins of the Peloponnesian War (1972) and The Class Struggle in the Ancient Greek World: from the Archaic Age to the Arab Conquests (1981). He was also a noted contributor on the issue of Christian persecution between the reigns of the Roman Emperors Trajan and Diocletian. Of particular note in this regard are the articles written by Ste. Croix and A. N. Sherwin-White, each challenging the opinions of the other. There were four in total, displaying the light-hearted banter evident also in Ste. Croix's correspondence with Moses Finley.

=== The Character of the Athenian Empire (1954) ===
Ste. Croix's influential article The Character of the Athenian Empire, which first appeared in Historia: Zeitschrift für Alte Geschichte (1954, 3, pp. 1–41), provoked a fresh debate about the nature of the Delian League and the Athenian Empire which continues to this day. The article was based on a paper The Alleged Unpopularity of the Athenian Empire delivered to the London Classical Association on 14 June 1950.

=== The Origins of the Peloponnesian War (1972) ===
The Origins of the Peloponnesian War made several major contributions to scholarship on the subject of the Peloponnesian War between Sparta and Athens, the major one being a reinterpretation of the Megarian Decree, passed by the Athenian Ekklesia in 432 BC. Most scholarship hitherto had considered the decree to involve economic sanctions by excluding the Megarian state and Megarian traders from access to ports throughout the Athenian Empire. Ste. Croix instead interpreted it as a religious sanction (drawing an analogy with the Spartan demand, in response to the Megarian Decree and other Athenian policies, for Athens to expel some religiously-tainted citizens). Ste. Croix maintained that the sanction was exercised not to hurt the Megarians, which it could not do because of the nature of trade and economics in the ancient world, but on religious grounds, which were felt to be genuine by the Athenians. His argument has not achieved general acceptance among historians.

Ernst Badian severely judged Ste. Croix's book for his "obsessive hatred of Sparta". In his opinion, the book was "written to prove that Sparta bears almost sole responsibility for the outbreak of the Peloponnesian War".

=== The Class Struggle in the Ancient Greek World (1981) ===
The Class Struggle in the Ancient Greek World was an attempt to establish the validity of a historical materialist analysis of the ancient Greek and Roman world. It covers the period roughly from Greek pre-classical times to the Arab conquest. Part one addresses fundamental topics. After an expository plan chapter II (Class, Exploitation, and Class Struggle) begins with an apologia of Ste. Croix's understanding of basic classical Marxist theory (§ I The nature of class society) and some specific terms (§ II "Class', 'exploitation', and 'the class struggle' defined). The remainder of Part One is a detailed analysis of these concepts applied to the Ancient Greek World (Chs. III Property and the Propertied and IV Forms of Exploitation in the Ancient Greek World, and the Small Independent Producer).

Part II contains the historical analysis per se and begins (Ch. V The Class Struggle in Greek History on the Political Plane) with an exposition of how the economic processes addressed in part I lead to a gradual but complete eradication of Greek democracy by the middle of the Roman principate. The remaining chapters (VI Rome the Suzerain, VII The Class Struggle on the Ideological Plane, and VIII "The Decline and Fall" of the Roman Empire: an Explanation) focus primarily on Rome and put forth the thesis that it was the increasing dependence on slave labor and diminishment of what would be considered in a modern context the middle classes that was the actual cause of the collapse. There is also a lengthy discussion of the significance of the mode by which surplus value is generated. Ste. Croix makes the point that the mode of surplus extraction is not necessarily the same as the mode of production engaged in by a majority of the population. Specifically, that while a relatively small portion of the work force were slaves, Rome under the principate nonetheless became essentially a slave society.

== Selected publications ==
- "The character of the Athenian empire" in Historia: Zeitschrift für Alte Geschichte, 3, 1954, pp. 1–41.
- Greek and Roman Accounting. London: Sweet & Maxwell, 1956.
- The Origins of the Peloponnesian War. London: Duckworth, 1972.
- Early Christian Attitudes to Property and Slavery. Oxford: Basil Blackwell, 1975.
- The Class Struggle in the Ancient Greek World: From the Archaic Age to the Arab Conquests. London, Duckworth, 1981.

Awards
Preceded by Neil Harding	Deutscher Memorial Prize; 1982	Succeeded by Barbara Taylor
