= Brian Kelly (historian) =

American historian

Brian Kelly is an American historian and a Reader in US history, teaching at Queen's University Belfast in Northern Ireland. His work is concerned mainly with labor and race in the American South, although much of his most recent scholarship focuses on the formative struggles around slave emancipation during the American Civil War and the Reconstruction Era that followed.

Kelly came into academia after extended stints in the construction and shipbuilding industries in Boston. After brief periods working in Seattle and New York, he was awarded a Crown Fellowship to pursue postgraduate study in US History at Brandeis University. Awarded his doctorate at Brandeis in 1998 for a dissertation supervised by Jacqueline Jones, Kelly has published widely on race and class in the nineteenth and twentieth-century United States, including an award-winning study of working-class interracialism in the Birmingham district (Alabama) coal mines. Kelly's Race, Class, and Power in the Alabama Coalfields, 1908-1921 (University of Illinois Press, 2001, ISBN 0252069331) won five major book awards, including the HL Mitchell Award, the Frances Butler Simkins Prize from the Southern Historical Association and the Isaac and Tamara Deutscher Memorial Prize for the "best and most innovative work in Marxist historiography".

Kelly's Alabama study made three main historiographical contributions. It argued that the re-subordination of black labor that followed the defeat of Reconstruction was a key component of the New South modernization project: progress and reaction went hand-in-hand. Countering the trend in labor history toward the explanatory power of 'whiteness', the study aimed to show that the region's most powerful employers (and not white workers) were the main beneficiaries of Jim Crow, and that the most substantial challenge to racism in early twentieth-century Birmingham came not from liberal elites, but from an interracial working-class movement that held together in the face of energetic attempts to divide them. Finally, Kelly discovered in the Birmingham district an emerging black middle class, deeply influenced by Booker T. Washington's 'industrial accommodationism', that had hitched its influence to anti-union employers.

In a series of articles published after the Alabama study, Kelly attempted to follow up on this latter theme, charting the emergence of intra-racial tensions across the Jim Crow South, including in his "Sentinels for New South Industry," published in Time Longer than Rope (2003), in a chapter in Eric Arnesen's The Black Worker: Race and Labor Activism since Emancipation (2007) and in "No Easy Way Through: Race Leadership and Black Workers at the Nadir" (2010).

Between 2010 and 2015, Kelly directed an international collaborative research project, After Slavery: Race, Labor, and Politics in the Post-Emancipation Carolinas with project partners Bruce E. Baker (Newcastle) and Susan E. O'Donovan (Memphis). In March 2010, the After Slavery Project hosted a Conference on Race, Labor, and Citizenship in the Post-Emancipation South at the College of Charleston, the largest-ever academic conference on the Reconstruction era, with more than 250 participants, including leading scholars Steven Hahn (who gave the keynote) and Eric Foner. Out of this came a co-edited volume, After Slavery: Race, Labor and Citizenship in the Reconstruction South, with essays by leading historians in the field, and appraised by Bruce Levine as "an unusually stimulating collection" and "a must-read for scholars working in the field" of Reconstruction.

He has held fellowships at the National Humanities Center (NC), the Institute for Southern Studies of the University of South Carolina and the W. E. B. Du Bois Institute at Harvard University. He is a faculty affiliate of the Lowcountry and Atlantic World Program (CLAW) at the College of Charleston in South Carolina, and has been involved in teaching exchanges in Brazil and South Africa, and was a 2024-25 PALS Fellow at Birzeit University in the occupied West Bank.

In recent years Kelly's work in US history has straddled three main areas: labor and abolition; black working-class political mobilization during and immediately after the Civil War; and marxist historiography and the history of the American Left. He is particularly interested in the intellectual legacy of WEB Du Bois's magisterial Black Reconstruction in America and, in an extended article on "Slave Self-Activity and the Bourgeois Revolution in the United States" [Historical Materialism, 2018] published "the first systematic reappraisal of the scale and dynamics of [Du Bois's notion of the] slaves’ general strike". His current project is an extended monograph on African American labor and political mobilization in black-majority Reconstruction South Carolina, under contract with Verso.

== Select publications ==
=== Books ===
- Race, Class, and Power in the Alabama Coalfields, 1908-1921 (University of Illinois Press, 2001). ISBN 978-0-252-06933-8
- Labor, Free and Slave (University of Illinois Press, 2007) ISBN 978-0-252-07428-8
- After Slavery: Race, Labor and Citizenship in the Reconstruction South (Florida University Press, 2013) ISBN 9780813060972

=== Articles and Book Chapters ===
- 'Ambiguous Loyalties: the Boston Irish, Slavery, and the American Civil War'. Historical Journal of Massachusetts 24:2 (Summer 1996): 165-204.
- 'Policing the ‘Negro Eden’: Racial Paternalism in the Alabama Coalfields, 1908-1921'. Alabama Review 51:3-4 (July, October 1998): 163-183; 243-265. Milo B. Howard Award (best article for 1998-1999)
- 'Labour, Race, and the Search for a Central Theme in the History of the Jim Crow South'. Irish Journal of American Studies 10 (Dec. 2002): 55-74.
- 'Beyond the "Talented Tenth"': Black Workers, Black Elites, and the Limits of Accommodation in Industrial Birmingham, 1900–1920'. In Adam Green and Charles Payne (eds), Time Longer than Rope: A Century of African-American Activism, 1850–1950 (New York, 2003).
- 'Materialism and the Persistence of Race in the Jim Crow South' [Deutscher Memorial Prize Lecture] in Historical Materialism 12 (2004).
- 'Black workers, the Republican Party, and the crisis of Reconstruction in lowcountry South Carolina'. International Review of Social History 51:3 (2006).
- 'Industrial Sentinels Confront the "Rabid Faction"': Booker T. Washington, Industrial Accommodation, and the Labor Question in the Jim Crow South'. In Eric Arnesen (ed.), The Black Worker: Race and Labor Activism since Emancipation (Illinois, 2006).
- "Mapping Alternate Routes to Antislavery" – Contribution to ‘Up for Debate' in Labor: Studies in Working-Class History of the Americas 5:4 (Winter 2008): 69-73.
- ‘Emancipations and Reversals: Labor, Race, and the Boundaries of American Freedom in the Age of Capital'. International Labor and Working Class History (Nov. 2008).
- 'Labor and Place: The Contours of Freedpeoples' Mobilization in Reconstruction South Carolina'. Journal of Peasant Studies: Special Issue on ‘Rethinking Agrarian History' (Nov. 2008).
- ‘Martin Luther King, the Memphis Sanitation Strike, and the Unfinished Business of the American Civil Rights Movement'. International Socialism Journal 118 (Spring 2008).
- 'Emancipations and Reversals: Labor, Race and the Boundaries of American Freedom in the Age of Capital'. International Labor and Working Class History 75: 1 (Spring 2009): 1-15.
- 'No Easy Way Through: Black Workers and Race Leadership at the Nadir'. Labor: Studies in the Working-Class History of the Americas 7:3 (Nov. 2010): 79-93. [see also related correspondence in Nov. 2012 issue]
- 'The After Slavery Website: A New Online Resource for Teaching US Slave Emancipation'. Journal of the Civil War Era 1:4 (Nov. 2011): 581-594. [co-authored with John W. White]
- 'A Slaveholders’ Republic in the Tumult of War'. Review Essay on The Long Shadow of the Civil War: Southern Dissent and Its Legacies, by Victorian E. Bynum, and Confederate Reckoning: Power and Politics in the Civil War South, by Stephanie McCurry. Reviews in American History 40:4 (December 2012).
- 'Class, Factionalism, and the Radical Retreat: Black Laborers and the Republican Party in South Carolina, 1865-1900'. in Baker and Kelly, eds. After Slavery: Race, Labor and Citizenship in the Reconstruction South (2013): 199-220. * 'Du Bois’s Prolific "Error" and the Challenge to Color-Blind Orthodoxy'. Contribution to ‘Up for Debate’ in Labor: Studies in Working-Class History of the Americas (Dec. 2015): 11-15.
- 'Jubilee and the Limits of African American Freedom after Emancipation'. Race and Class 57:3 (January 2016): 59-70.
- 'W. E. B. Du Bois, Black Agency and the Slave’s Civil War'. in International Socialist Review 100 (Spring 2016): 48-68.
- 'Difficult Labor: Troublesome Company at the New Birth of Freedom,” Contribution to Roundtable on Mark Lause’s Free Labor: The Civil War and the Making of an American Working Class. in Working USA: The Journal of Labor and Society (2017).
- 'Gathering Antipathy: Irish Immigrants and Race in America's Age of Emancipation'. in J. Devin Trew and Michael Pierse, ed. Rethinking the Irish Diaspora (2018): 157-185.
- 'Slave Self-Activity and the Bourgeois Revolution in the United States: Jubilee and the Boundaries of Black Freedom'. in Historical Materialism 27 (2019).
- “A ‘Carnival of Reaction’: Partition and the defeat of Ireland’s revolutionary wave,” in Northern Ireland at 100 Partition and Its Consequences (Cork University Press, forthcoming 2022) [with Fearghal Mac Bhloscaidh]

Awards
Preceded by James Holstun	Deutscher Memorial Prize; 2002	Succeeded by Neil Davidson
Preceded by James Holstun	Deutscher Memorial Prize; 2002	Succeeded by Benno Teschke
