= Michael A. Lebowitz =

Canadian economist and professor (1937–2023)

- Born: November 27, 1937; Newark, New Jersey, U.S.
- Died: April 19, 2023 (aged 85); Vancouver, British Columbia, Canada.
- Spouse: Marta Harnecker (2004 - 2019)

Academic background
- Education: New York University School of Commerce; University of Wisconsin–Madison
- Influences: Karl Marx, Vladimir Lenin, Rosa Luxemburg, Paul Sweezy

Academic work
- School or tradition: Marxian economics

Michael A. Lebowitz (November 27, 1937 – April 19, 2023) was a Marxist economist and professor emeritus of Economics at Simon Fraser University in Vancouver, Canada.

== Early life ==
He was born in Newark, New Jersey, on 27 November 1937 to Louis Lebowitz (machinist) and Dora Lebowitz (bookkeeper). Ten years later, his family moved to Passaic, New Jersey, where he completed public school in 1955. He studied economics and marketing at the New York University School of Commerce at night while working days at Federal Pioneer Electric (FPE) as a statistical clerk and then market research analyst. Graduating cum laude with a BS in 1960, he went on to do graduate work in economics (with an emphasis upon economic history) at the University of Wisconsin–Madison, earning a master's degree in 1964.

== Career ==
In 1965, without completing his doctoral thesis, he took a job to teach economics and economic history at the new university in British Columbia, Canada, Simon Fraser University, where he specialized in teaching Marxist Economics and Comparative Economic Systems until his retirement in 2000 as professor emeritus.

=== Work ===
Lebowitz worked at FPE during the day at a time when the electrical products industry was engaged in price fixing and allocation of market shares while at night at NYU he was taught all about how prices were determined by competition in the free market. As a result of this disparity, he began to study Thorsten Veblen and Karl Marx, critics of mainstream theory, and to collaborate with Labor Research Associates, contributing several articles (as "an economist friend") in Economic Notes.

In order to study economic institutions such as the corporation, Lebowitz applied to the University of Wisconsin, which had a reputation for Institutional Economics. Finding that description no longer accurate, he focused upon economic history. While in Madison (1960–5), he was active in the Wisconsin Socialist Club, Fair Play for Cuba, Friends of the Student Nonviolent Coordinating Committee (SNCC) and joined the editorial board of Studies on the Left, a journal of the New Left. He was invited to co-chair the economics workshop for the 1962 Port Huron meeting of the Students for a Democratic Society (SDS), which produced the Port Huron Statement of SDS. Subsequently, he was active in the Madison chapter of SDS and in antiwar activity.

Upon arriving at Simon Fraser in its first year of operation, he taught introductory economics and economic history but went on to teach the history of economic thought and comparative economic systems. He added a new course, Introduction to Marxist Economics plus periodic Selected Topics in Marxian Economics. Active in university politics, he was President of the Faculty Union (including many junior faculty) and on the University Senate, where he supported the Political Science, Sociology and Anthropology (PSA) department, which the university was determined to purge. After a failed strike of PSA faculty, he served as defense counsel for one of the suspended PSA faculty, who was acquitted.

Outside of the university, he was active in local community organizing and in the "Waffle Caucus'" of the New Democratic Party (NDP), was elected to the party executive in British Columbia and served as Party Policy Chair during the NDP government, 1972–5. Influenced by the Institute for Workers Control in the UK, he introduced party policies focused upon workers' control.

In 1978, he was invited to participate in the Socialism in the World Conference in Cavtat, Yugoslavia and was a regular participant until 1986 and used this opportunity to study self-management. Also, he joined the editorial board in 1980 of Studies in Political Economy. During this period, he used a sabbatical year to study Marx's newly translated Grundrisse and Hegel; this was followed by articles on Marx's theory of needs, the falling rate of profits, crisis theory, one-sided Capital and the first edition (1992) of Beyond Capital: Marx's Political Economy of the Working Class. In this book, Lebowitz introduced what would become a continuing theme in his work--- the focus upon the simultaneous changing of circumstances and self-change ("revolutionary practice").

In 1994, he participated in the World Solidarity Conference on Cuba in Havana (during the Special Period) and came several years after for the annual North American and Cuban Philosophers and Other Social Scientists meetings. In 1997 he came to Cuba to research the effect of the Special Period on solidaristic institutions, gave several talks at the Faculty of Economics, and met Marta Harnecker. He became a regular participant in the annual Globalization Conferences in Havana and organized international Marx Conferences in Havana in 2003, 2004 and 2006.

The revised edition of Beyond Capital was published in 2003, and it received the Deutscher Memorial Prize in 2004 for the best and most innovative writing in the Marxist tradition. 2003 was also the year Lebowitz and Harnecker (who had been invited by Venezuelan President Hugo Chavez to be an assistant) arranged to move to Venezuela; in 2004, Lebowitz became an assistant to Nelson Merentes, at that time Minister of the Social Economy of Venezuela. He gave talks there on Yugoslav self-management in 2004 and 2005 at the Workers Table of the International Solidarity Conferences, and one talk from 2005, "El Socialismo no Cae del Cielo", was widely read and published in several editions after President Chavez praised it on his weekly TV show, Alo Presidente. Several of these essays were incorporated in Build it Now: Socialism for the 21st Century, published in 2006.

In 2004, Harnecker and Lebowitz urged Chavez to create a thinktank which could be a home for foreign intellectuals who wanted to come to support the Bolivarian Revolution, and in 2006, Centro Internacional Miranda (CIM) was officially founded with offices and meeting rooms located at the Hotel Anauco, where they lived. At CIM, Lebowitz directed a program on Transformative Practice and Human Development and, with the help of several assistants, organized several conferences and invited speakers on this theme. During this period, he responded to several requests for papers from President Chavez, became an advisor to the Minister of Economic Development and Planning in 2008 and published several books in English (e.g., The Socialist Alternative: Real Human Development) and in Spanish in Cuba and Venezuela.

In 2011 Harnecker and Lebowitz returned to Vancouver and proceeded to produce several books, one of which won her the Libertador Prize in 2013 for A World to Build: New Paths Toward Twenty-First Socialism (as published in English in 2015). When the substantial funds associated with this prize became available, they established a program in Cuba on Socialism for the 21st Century. Working with several Cuban intellectuals and with the support of the Venezuelan Embassy, beginning in 2016 the program organized several talks and panels and published a series of short books (including Lebowitz's "What is Socialism for the 21st Century?", later published in English). This venture was cut short when they returned to Vancouver for medical care for her cancer.

== Awards ==
- Received the Deutscher Memorial Prize in 2004 for the best and most innovative writing in the Marxist tradition.
- A winner of the Distinguished Achievement Award of World Political Economy of the 21st Century, issued by the journal World Review of Political Economy.

== Books ==
- Lebowitz, Michael A. (2003). Beyond capital: Marx's political economy of the working class (2nd ed.). New York: Palgrave Macmillan. ISBN 978-0333964309
- Lebowitz, Michael A. (2006). Build it now: socialism for the twenty-first century. New York: Monthly Review Press. ISBN 978-1583671450
- Lebowitz, Michael A. (2009). The Path to Human Development: Capitalism Or Socialism?. Bangalore: Books for Change. ISBN 978-81-8291-073-7
- Lebowitz, Michael A. (2009). Following Marx: method, critique, and crisis. Chicago, IL: Haymarket Books. ISBN 978-1608460335
- Lebowitz, Michael A. (2010). The socialist alternative: real human development. New York. ISBN 978-1583672143
- Lebowitz, Michael A. (2012). The contradictions of "real socialism": the conductor and the conducted. New York: Monthly Review Press. ISBN 978-1583672563
- Lebowitz, Michael A. (2015). The socialist imperative: from Gotha to now. New York. ISBN 978-1583675465
- Lebowitz, Michael A. (2020). Between capitalism and community. New York. ISBN 9781583678862
