= Matteo Pasquinelli =

Italian philosopher and writer

Matteo Pasquinelli (born 1974) is an Italian academic, writer, and exhibition curator.

He is an associate professor in Philosophy of Science at the Department of Philosophy and Cultural Heritage of Ca' Foscari University of Venice.

His book The Eye of the Master: A Social History of Artificial Intelligence won the 2024 Deutscher Memorial Prize.

== Books ==
- The Eye of the Master: A Social History of Artificial Intelligence (Verso, 2023)
- Animal Spirits: A Bestiary of the Commons (2008)
