= Leslie Brubaker =

British Byzantinist

- Born: 1951 (age 74–75)
- Spouse: Christopher Wickham (m. 1990; died 2026)

Academic background
- Education: Pennsylvania State University (BA, MA); Johns Hopkins University (PhD)
- Thesis: The Illustrated Copy of the Homilies of Gregory of Nazianzus in Paris (1982)
- Doctoral advisor: Herbert L. Kessler

Academic work
- Discipline: Art history
- Sub-discipline: Byzantine art; Byzantine Iconoclasm; Byzantine manuscripts
- Notable works: Gender and the Transformation of the Roman World (2003); The Cult of the Mother of God in Byzantium: Texts and Images (2011); Inventing Byzantine Iconoclasm (2012)

Leslie Brubaker (born 1951) is a British expert in Byzantine illustrated manuscripts. She was appointed Professor of Byzantine Art at the University of Birmingham in 2005, and is now professor emerita. Her research interests includes female patronage, icons and the cult of the Virgin Mary. She was formerly the head of Postgraduate Studies in the College of Arts and Law, University of Birmingham. Professor Brubaker is the Chair of the Society for the Promotion of Byzantine Studies. Her work is widely stocked in libraries around the world.

== Biography ==
Brubaker was educated at Pennsylvania State University, where she obtained her B.A. in 1972 and then an M.A. in 1976. Brubaker continued on to complete her PhD at Johns Hopkins University. Her PhD thesis was entitled 'The Illustrated Copy of the Homilies of Gregory of Nazianzus in Paris (Bibliothèque Nationale, cod. gr. 510)' (in two volumes). Brubaker was simultaneously employed as an instructor in the Department of Art, Wheaton College, Massachusetts, between 1981 and 1983. She became an Assistant (1983–1990) and then Associate Professor (1990–93) in the Department of Art, Wheaton College, while also serving as chair at the college in 1993–94.

In 1994, Brubaker moved to the University of Birmingham in England, where she has continued her research and teaching career up until the present day; in 2005, she was appointed as Professor of Byzantine Art History. She arranged to share the position with Dr Ruth Macrides, so enabling both women to do research and "have a life".

From 2003, she has served as the Director of the Centre Byzantine, Ottoman and Modern Greek Studies (founded by Anthony Bryer) at the University of Birmingham, and from 2005 to 2009 as the assistant director (Research) of the Institute of Archaeology and Antiquity.

In 1990, she married Professor Christopher Wickham, an early medieval scholar.

== Research ==
Brubaker began as an expert in Byzantine illuminated manuscripts, writing a pathbreaking book on one manuscript, Paris Grec. 510, in her Vision and Meaning. Her interests have extended since to the cultural history of Iconoclasm and the development of the cult of icons, on which she wrote two now-basic books on the subject with John Haldon. She has written substantially on the relationship between material culture and its visual expressions, and other aspects of cultural history, including visual and textual representations of gender, and female patronage.

She has been fellowships at Dumbarton Oaks Research Library and Collection, first in 1980–81 as a Junior Fellow, a Summer Fellow in 1984 and a Spring Fellow in 2001 and 2016.

Her research into icons, relics and the proliferation of the cult of the Virgin Mary (known as the Theotokos) in Byzantium developed into a major research project subsidized by an Arts and Humanities Research Council grant and the International Iconoclasms network, led by Brubaker with Dr Richard Clay (University of Birmingham), in collaboration with the Tate Britain.

A festschrift in her honour was published in 2011.

In November 2022, an event was held, ‘Seeing Through Byzantium’, celebrating the career and scholarship of Brubaker as professor emerita of Byzantine Art History and Director of the Centre for Byzantine, Ottoman and Modern Greek Studies.

== Publications ==
=== Monographs ===
- Vision and meaning in ninth-century Byzantium: Image as exegesis in the Homilies of Gregory of Nazianzus in Paris (Cambridge University Press, 1999). Pp 489. Reprinted 2001. Re-issued in paperback edition 2008. ISBN 0521621534
- Byzantium in the Iconoclast era (ca 680 - ca 850): The Sources (Aldershot, 2001), with JF Haldon. Pp 307. ISBN 0754604187
- Gender and the Transformation of the Roman World, 300-900 (2003)
- Gender in the Early Medieval World: East and West, 300-900 (Cambridge University Press, 2004), with J Smith. Pp 333. ISBN 0521813476
- Byzantium in the Iconoclast era ca 680 – ca 850: A History (Cambridge University Press, 2011), with JF Haldon. Pp xxiv + 917. ISBN 9780521430937
- The Cult of the Mother of God in Byzantium: Texts and Images (Ashgate, 2011), with M Cunningham. ISBN 0754662667
- Inventing Byzantine Iconoclasm (2012)

=== Other articles ===
- 'The Tabernacle Miniatures of the Middle Byzantine Octateuchs', Actes du XVe Congrès International d'Etudes Byzantines II (Athens, 1981), 73‑92.
- 'Politics, Patronage and Art in Ninth‑Century Byzantium: The Homilies of Gregory of Nazianzus in Paris', Dumbarton Oaks Papers 39 (1985), 1‑13.
- 'The Introduction of Painted Initials in Byzantium', Scriptorium 45 (1991), 22–46.
- 'Byzantine Art in the Ninth Century: Theory, Practice, and Culture', Byzantine and Modern Greek Studies 13 (1989), 23‑93.
- 'Icons before Iconoclasm?', Settimane di studio del Centro italiano di studi sull'alto medioevo XLV (1998), 1215–54.
- 'The Chalke Gate, the construction of the past, and the Trier ivory', Byzantine and Modern Greek Studies 23 (1999), 258–85.
- 'The gender of money: Byzantine empresses on coins (324–802)', with H Tobler, Gender and History 12 (2000), 572–94.
- 'Memories of Helena: patterns in imperial female matronage in the fourth and fifth centuries', in L James, ed., Women, Men and Eunuchs: Gender in Byzantium (London, 1997), 52–75.
- 'Sex, lies and textuality: the Secret History of Prokopios and the rhetoric of gender in sixth-century Byzantium' in L Brubaker and J Smith, ed., Gender in the early medieval world, east and west, 300-900 (Cambridge, 2004), 83–101.
- 'Pictures are good to think with: looking at, with, and through Byzantium', in P Odorico et al., eds, L'ecriture de la mémoire. La littérarité de l'historiographie (Paris, 2006), 221–40.
- 'Every cliché in the book: the linguistic turn and the text-image discourse in Byzantine manuscripts', in L James, ed., Art and Text in Byzantium (Cambridge, 2007), 58–82.
- 'Critical approaches to art history', in E Jeffreys et al., ed., Oxford handbook of Byzantine Studies (Oxford, 2008), 59–66.
