= Rick Kuhn =

Australian Marxian economist and political analyst

- Born: 18 September 1955 (age 71)

Academic background
- Influences: Marx · Engels · Lenin · Luxemburg · Trotsky · Cliff · Grossman · Lukács

Academic work
- Discipline: Politics and international relations
- School or tradition: Marxian economics
- Institutions: Australian National University
- Awards: Deutscher Memorial Prize

Rick Kuhn (born 18 September 1955) is an Australian Marxian economist, political analyst and reader at the Australian National University in Canberra. He is best known for his biographical study on Henryk Grossman, for which he won the Deutscher Memorial Prize in 2007. Chris Harman of the British Socialist Workers Party and editor of International Socialism described the biography as "a valuable addition to our theoretical armour." Kuhn is of Jewish origin and is a member of Jews Against Oppression and Occupation. He was the convenor of ACTNOW, the umbrella anti-war organisation in Canberra, formed in response to the wars on Afghanistan and Iraq. He is also a long-term member of the Trotskyist organisation Socialist Alternative and was a founding editor of the online journal Marxist Interventions. Kuhn has published articles in Socialist Alternative, International Socialist Review, Socialist Worker, New Matilda, Monthly Review, ZNet, The Canberra Times and various academic journals and edited collections.

== Publications ==
- Labor's Conflict: Big Business, Workers and the Politics of Class, (with Tom Bramble), Cambridge University Press, Melbourne, 2010.
- Henryk Grossman and the Recovery of Marxism, University of Illinois Press, Urbana, 2007.
- Class and Struggle in Australia, (edited) Pearson Education Australia, Melbourne, 2005.
- Class & Class Conflict in Australia, (edited with Tom O'Lincoln) Longman Australia, Melbourne, 1996.

Awards
Preceded by Chris Wickham	Deutscher Memorial Prize; 2007	Succeeded by Kees van der Pijl
