= Chris Wickham =

British historian (1950–2026)

Chris Wickham FBA FLSW FRHistS
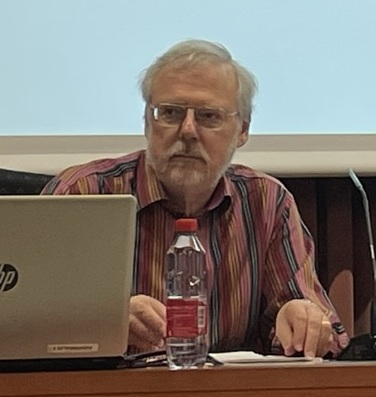
- Wickham in 2022
- Born: Christopher John Wickham; 18 May 1950; Rossett, Wales
- Died: 9 October 2026 (aged 76)
- Title: Chichele Professor of Medieval History
- Spouse: Leslie Brubaker (m. 1990)
- Awards: Deutscher Memorial Prize (2006)

Academic background
- Education: Keble College, Oxford (BA, DPhil)
- Thesis: Economy and Society in 8th Century Northern Tuscany (1975)
- Doctoral advisor: Eric Stone
- Other advisor: Donald Bullough

Academic work
- Discipline: History
- Sub-discipline: Medieval history; social history; Medieval Italy; early medieval Europe
- Institutions: University of Birmingham; University of Oxford

Christopher John Wickham FBA FLSW FRHistS (18 May 1950 – 9 October 2026) was a British historian and academic. From 2005 to 2016, he was the Chichele Professor of Medieval History at the University of Oxford and Fellow of All Souls College, Oxford. He had previously taught at the University of Birmingham from 1977, rising to be Professor of Early Medieval History from 1997 to 2005.

== Early life and education ==
Wickham was born in Rossett, Wales, on 18 May 1950. He was educated at Millfield, a public school in Street, Somerset, England. From 1968 to 1975, he studied at Keble College, Oxford. He graduated from the University of Oxford with a Bachelor of Arts (BA) degree in 1971. He then remained to undertake postgraduate research and completed his Doctor of Philosophy (DPhil) degree in 1975 with a thesis entitled Economy and society in 8th century northern Tuscany.

== Academic career ==
Wickham spent nearly thirty years of his career at the University of Birmingham. He was a Lecturer from 1977 to 1987 and a Senior Lecturer from 1987 to 1989. He was promoted to Reader in 1989, and made Professor of Medieval History in 1993. He was the deputy to John Haldon as head of the School of Historical Studies at Birmingham for several years prior to 2005.

In 2005, he was appointed as Chichele Professor of Medieval History in the University of Oxford and fellow of All Souls College, Oxford. From 2009 to 2012, he also served as chair of the Faculty of History. From September 2015 to the end of the academic year, he was additionally Head of the Humanities Division of the University of Oxford. He retired at the end of the 2015/2016 academic year, in line with Oxford's mandatory retirement policy. Upon retirement, Wickham was appointed Professor of Medieval History on a part-time basis at the University of Birmingham. He was appointed Director of the British School at Rome on 5 November 2020, and held the post until July 2021.

From June 2009 to July 2011, Wickham served as a company director of the Past and Present Society. On 6 July 2013, Wickham was appointed a company director of the Past and Present Society, and he retained this position until July 2021.

=== Scholarship ===
His main area of research was medieval Italy – and more specifically Tuscany and central Italy – from the end of the Roman Empire through to the mid-thirteenth century. His emphasis was largely social and economic, though he also studied the legal and political history of the area. More generally, Wickham used a modified Marxist framework to examine how European society changed from late antiquity into the early Middle Ages, and pioneered comparative socio-economic analysis in this period.

In 2005 his work Framing the Early Middle Ages was published, which claims to be the first synthesis of early medieval European history since the 1920s. It is exceptional for its use of hitherto unincorporated evidence from both documentary and archaeological sources, as well as its bold use of comparative methods and rejection of national narratives. It was awarded prizes, including the Wolfson History Prize in 2006, the Deutscher Memorial Prize in 2006 and the American Historical Association's James Henry Breasted Prize in January 2007. He edited Marxist History Writing for the Twenty-First Century, a volume that sees various academics discuss the status and profile of Marxist historiography, and wrote a general history of early medieval Europe, published by Penguin, which examines cultural, religious and intellectual developments of the period not covered in his previous socio-economic study.

== Personal life and death ==
In 1990, Wickham married Leslie Brubaker, a Byzantine scholar.

He was a member of the Labour Party, and was previously a member of the Democratici di Sinistra (Democrats of the Left). He was also active in the Communist Party of Great Britain alongside John Haldon while working at the University of Birmingham.

Wickham died on 9 October 2026, aged 76.

== Honours ==
In 1998, Wickham was elected a Fellow of the British Academy (FBA). In 2006, he was awarded the Wolfson History Prize for his book Framing the Early Middle Ages: Europe and the Mediterranean 400–800. In 2014, he was awarded the Serena Medal by the British Academy "in recognition of his reputation as a medieval historian of exceptional distinction who has transformed our understanding of the early medieval Italian world". He was also elected a foreign member of the Accademia Nazionale dei Lincei, a fellow of the Learned Society of Wales in 2012, and an associate member of the Royal Academy of Science, Letters and Fine Arts of Belgium in 2014.

== Published works ==
=== Books ===
==== Authored ====
- Early Medieval Italy: Central Power and Local Society, 400–1000 (1981)
- Studi sulla società degli Appennini nell'alto Medioevo. Contadini, signori e insediamento nel territorio di Valva (Sulmona) (1982)
- Il problema dell'incastellamento nell'Italia centrale. L'esempio di San Vincenzo al Volturno (1985)
- The Mountains and the City: The Tuscan Apennines in the Early Middle Ages (1988)
- Social Memory (1992; with James Fentress)
- Land and Power: Studies in Italian and European Social History, 400–1200 (1994)
- Community and Clientele in Twelfth-Century Tuscany: The Origins of the Rural Commune in the Plain of Lucca (1998; first published in Italian, 1995)
- Courts and Conflict in Twelfth-Century Tuscany (2003; first published in Italian, 2000)
- Framing the Early Middle Ages: Europe and the Mediterranean 400–800 (2005)
- The Inheritance of Rome: A History of Europe from 400 to 1000 (2009)
- Medieval Rome: Stability and Crisis of a City, 900–1150 (2014; first published in Italian, 2013)
- Sleepwalking into a New World: The Emergence of Italian City Communes in the Twelfth Century (2015)
- Medieval Europe (2016)
- The Donkey and the Boat: Reinterpreting the Mediterranean Economy, 950–1180 (2023)

==== Edited ====
- City and Countryside in Late Medieval and Renaissance Italy: Essays Presented to Philip Jones (1990, with Trevor Dean)
- Las crisis en la historia (1995)
- The Long Eighth Century: Production, Distribution and Demand (2000, with Inge Lyse Hansen)
- Le marché de la terre au Moyen Âge (2005, with Laurent Feller)
- Rodney Hilton's Middle Ages: An Exploration of Historical Themes (2007, with Christopher Dyer and Peter Coss)
- Marxist History-Writing for the Twenty-First Century (2007)
- The Langobards before the Frankish Conquest: An Ethnographic Perspective (2009, with Giorgio Ausenda and Paolo Delogu)
- Italy, 888–962: A Turning Point (2013, with Marco Valenti)
- The Prospect of Global History (2016, with James Belich, John Darwin and Margret Frenz)

=== Major articles (not reprinted in 1994) ===
- '‘Historical and Topographical Notes on Early Medieval South Etruria, Part I', Papers of the British School at Rome. Vol xlvi (1978) pp. 132–79
- '‘Historical and Topographical Notes on Early Medieval South Etruria, Part II', Papers of the British School at Rome. Vol xlvii (1979) pp. 66–95
- 'Economic and Social Institutions in Northern Tuscany in the 8th Century', in C. Wickham, M. Ronzabi, Y. Milo and A. Spicciani, Istituzioni ecclesiastiche della Toscana medievale (Galatina, 1980) pp. 7–34
- 'The Terra of San Vincenzo al Volturno in the 8th to 12th Centuries: The Historical Framework', in San Vincenzo al Volturno I: The Archaeology, Art and Territory of an Early Medieval Monastery (ed. R. Hodges and J. Mitchell), (Oxford, 1985) pp. 227–58
- 'Comprendere il quotidiano: antropologia sociale e storia sociale', Quaderni Storici. Vol xx (1985) pp. 839–57
- 'L’Italia e l’alto medioevo', Archeologia Medievale. Vol xv (1988) pp. 105–24
- 'Paesaggi sepolti: insediamento e incastellamento sull’Amiata, 750–1250', in L’Amiata nel medioevo. Atti del convegno internazionale di studi storici, Abbadia San Salvatore, 29 maggio–1 giugno 1986 (ed. M. Ascheri and W. Kurze), (Rome, 1989) pp. 101–37
- 'Documenti scritti e archeologia per una storia dell’incastellamento: l’esempio della Toscana', Archeologia Medievale. Vol xvi (1989) pp. 79–102
- 'Systactic Structures: Social Theory for Historians', Past and Present. Vol cxxxii (1991) pp. 188–203
- 'Economia e società rurale nel territorio lucchese durante la seconda metà del secolo XI: inquadrimenti aristocratici e strutture signorili', Nuovi Studi Storici. Vol xiii (1992) pp. 391–422
- 'La mutación feudal en Italia', in Los orígenes del feudalismo en el mundo mediterráneo (ed. A. Malpica Cuello, T. Quesada and P. Toubert), (Granada, 1994) pp. 31–55
- (with R. Francovich), 'Uno scavo archeologico ed il problema dello sviluppo della signoria territoriale: Rocca San Silvestro e i rapporti di produzione minerari', Archeologia Medievale. Vol xxi (1994) pp. 7–30
- 'Property Ownership and Signorial Power in Twelfth-Century Tuscany', in Property and Power in the Early Middle Ages (ed. W. Davies and P. Fouracre), (Cambridge, 1995) pp. 221–44
- 'Monastic Lands and Monastic Patrons', in San Vincenzo al Volturno 2: The 1980–86 Excavations, Part II (ed. R. Hodges), (London, 1995) pp. 138–52
- 'La signoria rurale in Toscana', in Strutture e trasformazioni della signoria rurale nei secoli X–XIII (ed. G. Dilcher and C. Violante), (Bologna, 1996) pp. 343–409
- 'Ecclesiastical Dispute and Lay Community: Figline Valdarno in the Twelfth Century', Mélanges de l'École française de Rome. Vol cviii.1 (1996) pp. 7–93
- 'Lineages of Western European Taxation, 1000–1200', in Corona, municipis i fiscalitat a la Baixa Edat Mitjana. Colloqui (ed. M. Sánchez Martinez, A. Furió and P. Bertran i Roigè), (Lleida, 1997) pp. 25–42
- 'Justice in the Kingdom of Italy in the Eleventh Century', Settimane di Studio. Vol xliv (1997) pp. 179–255
- 'Derecho y práctica legal en las comunas urbanas italianas del siglo XII: el caso de Pisa', Hispania. Vol lvii.3 (1997) pp. 981–1007
- (with R. Francovich) 'Unes excavacions arqueològiques i el problema de desenvolupament de la senyoria territorial: Rocca San Silvestro i les relacions de producció mineres', in La vida medieval als dos vessants del Pirineu. Comunitats pageses, estructures d’hàbitat, cultura material (Andorra, 1997). Vol iv, pp. 8–27
- 'Gossip and Resistance among the Medieval Peasantry', Past and Present. Vol clx (1998) pp. 3–24
- 'Aristocratic Power in Eighth-Century Lombard Italy', in After Rome’s Fall: Narrators and Sources of Early Medieval History (ed. A. Murray), (Toronto, 1998) pp. 153–70
- 'Le forme del feudalesimo', Settimane di Studio. Vol xlvii (2000) pp. 15–51
- 'Die ländlichen Herrschaftsstrukturen in der Toskana', in Strukturen und Wandlungen der ländlichen Herrschaftsformen vom 10. zum 13. Jahrhundert. Deutschland und Italien im Vergleich (ed. G. Dilcher and C. Violante), (Berlin, 2000) pp. 405–54
- 'Un pas vers le moyen âge? Permanences et mutations' in Les campagnes de la Gaule à la fin de l'Antiquité (ed. P. Ouzoulias et al.), (Antibes, 2001) pp. 555–67
- 'Paludi e miniere nella Maremma toscana, XI-XIII secoli' in Castrum 7 (ed. J.-M. Martin), (Rome, 2001) pp. 451–66
- (with E. Fentress), 'La valle dell'Albegna fra i secoli VII e XIV' in Siena e Maremma nel Medioevo (ed. M. Ascheri), (Sienna, 2001) pp. 59–82
- 'Society' in The Early Middle Ages (ed. R. McKitterick), (Oxford, 2001) pp. 59–94
- 'Comunidades rurales y señorio debil: el caso del norte de Italia, 1050–1250' in Comunidades locales y poderes feudales en la Edad media (ed. I. Álvarez), (Logroño, 2001) pp. 395–415
- 'Rural Economy and Society' in Italy in the Early Middle Ages (ed. C. La Rocca), (Oxford, 2002) pp. 118–43
- 'Studying Long-Term Change in the West, AD 400–800', in Theory and Practice in Late Antique Archaeology (ed. L. Lavan and W. Bowden), (Leiden, 2003) pp. 385–403
- 'Alto medioevo e identità nazionale', Storica. Vol ix (27) (2003) pp. 7–26
- 'Space and Society in Early Medieval Peasant Conflicts', Settimane di Studio. Vol l (2003) pp. 551–87
- 'Sobre la mutación socioeconómica de larga duración en Occidente durante los siglos V–VIII', Studia Historica. Historia Medieval. Vol xxii (2004) pp. 17–32
- 'The Mediterranean around 800: on the Brink of a Second Trade Cycle', Dumbarton Oaks Papers. Vol lviii (2004) pp. 161–74 JSTOR 3591384
- 'The Development of Villages in the West, 300–900', in Les villages dans l’Empire byzantin, IVe–XVe siècle (ed. J. Lefort, C. Morrisson, and J.-P. Sodini), (Paris, 2005) pp. 54–70
- 'Espacio y sociedad en los conflictos campesinos en la Alta Edad Media', in El Lugar del campesino: En torno a la obra de Reyna Pastor (ed. Ana Rodríguez), (València, 2007) pp. 33–60
- 'Productive Forces and the Economic Logic of the Feudal Mode of Production', Historical Materialism. Vol xvi (2008) pp. 3–22
- 'La cristalización de la aldea en la Europa Occidental (800–1100)', in Movimentos migratorios, asentiamentos y expansion, siglos VIII–XI (XXXIV semana de Estudios Medievales, Estella, 16–20 de julio 2007) (ed. J. M. Lacarra), (Pamplona, 2008) pp. 33–52
- 'Problems in Doing Comparative History', in Challenging the Boundaries of Medieval History: The Legacy of Timothy Reuter (ed. P. Skinner), (Turnhout, 2008) pp. 5–28
- 'Compulsory Gift Exchange in Lombard Italy, 650–1150', in The Languages of Gift in the Early Middle Ages (ed. W. Davies and P. Fouracre), (Cambridge, 2008) pp. 193–216
- 'Bounding the City: Concepts of Urban-Rural Difference in the West in the Early Middle Ages', Settimane di Studio. Vol lvi (2008) pp. 61–80
- 'Social Structures in Lombard Italy', in The Langobards before the Frankish Conquest: An Ethnographic Perspective (ed. C. Wickham, G. Ausenda, and P. Delogu), (Woodbridge, 2009) pp. 118–48
- 'Social Relations, Property and Power around the North Sea, 500–1000', in Social Relations: Property and Power (ed. B. J. P. van Bavel and R. W. Hoyle), (Turnhout, 2010) pp. 25–47
- 'The Changing Composition of Early Elites', in Théorie et pratiques des élites au Haut Moyen Âge: conception, perception et réalisation sociale (ed. F. Bougard, H.-W. Goetz, and R. Le Jan), (Turnhout, 2011) pp. 5–20
- 'Getting Justice in Twelfth-Century Rome', in Zwischen Pragmatik und Performanz. Dimensionen mittelalterlicher Schriftkultur (ed. C. Dartmann, T. Scharff, and C. F. Weber), (Turnhout, 2011) pp. 103–32
- 'The Origins of the Signoria in Central Lazio, 900–1100' in Uomini, paesaggi, storie. Studi di storia medievale per Giovanni Cherubini (ed. Duccio Balestracci et al.), 2 vols. (Siena, 2012). Vol i, pp. 481–94
- 'The Feudal Revolution and the Origins of the Italian City Communes (The Prothero Lecture)', Transactions of the Royal Historical Society, 6th ser. Vol xxiv (2014) pp. 29–55
- 'Sulle origini del comune di Bologna', Bullettino dell’Istituto storico italiano per il medioevo. Vol cxix (2016) pp. 209–37
- 'Consensus and Assemblies in the Romano-Germanic Kingdoms', Vorträge und Forschungen. Vol lxxxii (2017) pp. 387–424
- 'The Tivoli breve of 945' in Penser la paysannerie mediévale (ed. A. Dierkens et al.), (Paris, 2017) pp. 161–76
- 'Prima della crescita: quale società?' in La crescita economica nell’occidente medievale. Un tema storico non ancora esaurito. Atti del XXV Convegno Internazionale di Studi (Pistoia, 14–17 maggio 2015) (Rome, 2017) pp. 93–106
- 'The Power of Property: Land Tenure in Fāṭimid Egypt', Journal of the Economic and Social History of the Orient. Vol lxii (2019) pp. 67–107 JSTOR 27083373
- 'How Did the Feudal Economy Work? The Economic Logic of Medieval Societies', Past and Present. Vol ccli.1 (2021) pp. 3–40
- 'Informal and Formal Trading Associations in Egypt and Ifrīqiya, 850–1150' in The Historian of Islam at Work: Essays in Honor of Hugh N. Kennedy (ed. L. Osti and M. van Berkel), (Leiden, 2022) pp. 171–82

== Sources ==
- Cortese, Maria Elena; West, Charles (2022), "Intervista a Chris Wickham", Reti Medievali Rivista, 23 (1): 357–404
- Fairbrother, Daniel; Wickham, Chris (2018), "Medieval History and Theory: A Conversation", Rethinking History, 22 (4): 525–545, doi:10.1080/13642529.2018.1528047, S2CID 149937734
- 'Chris Wickham Bibliography', in Italy and Early Medieval Europe: Papers for Chris Wickham (ed. R. Balzaretti, J. Barrow and P. Skinner), (Oxford, 2018) pp. 539–50
- Debrett's People of Today (12th edn, London: Debrett's Peerage, 1999), p. 2090.
- "Wickham, Prof. Christopher John". Who's Who 2009. Oxford University Press. December 2008.

Awards
Preceded by Kevin Murphy	Deutscher Memorial Prize; 2006	Succeeded by Rick Kuhn
