= Marta Harnecker =

Chilean academic (1937–2019)

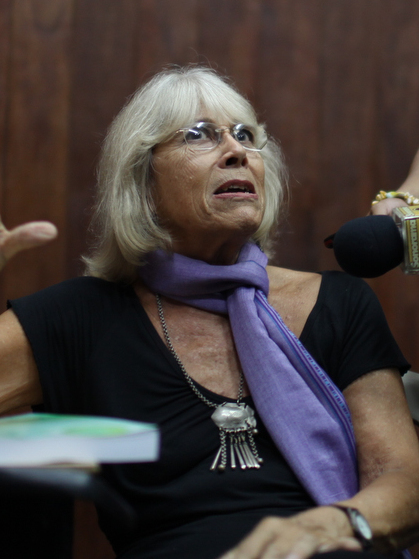
- Born: 18 January 1937; Santiago, Chile
- Died: 14 June 2019 (aged 82); Vancouver, Canada
- Education: Catholic University of Chile; École Normale Supérieure
- Occupations: Journalist, author, psychologist, sociologist
- Employer: University of Chile
- Spouses: Manuel Piñeiro (m. 1975; died 1998) Michael A. Lebowitz (m. 2004)
- Children: 1

Marta Harnecker (Spanish: [ˈmaɾta ˈaɾnekeɾ]; 18 January 1937 – 14 June 2019) was a Chilean journalist, author, psychologist, sociologist, and Marxist intellectual. She studied the analysis of labor movements and acted as an advisor to the government of Cuba, and worked with left-wing political movements within Latin America. She was active in the government of Salvador Allende between 1970 and 1973, and provided advice to Hugo Chávez between 2004 and 2011.

== Biography ==
Marta Harnecker was born in Santiago in 1937. Her family had Austrian roots. She studied psychology at the Catholic University of Chile in 1962, and did postgraduate studies in Paris with Paul Ricœur and Louis Althusser (École Normale Supérieure). Upon her return to Chile in 1968, she taught Historical Materialism and Political Economy in Sociology at the University of Chile and was director of the political magazine Chile Hoy.

In 1968, Harnecker joined the Socialist Party of Chile. She worked as a journalist in Chile during the Salvador Allende's presidency. Following the 1973 Chilean coup d'etat against Allende, she was forced into exile and lived in Cuba until the death of her first husband, Manuel Piñeiro. While living in Cuba, Harnecker founded the research institute Memoria Popular Latinoamerica (MEPLA) and continued to write. After her time in Cuba, she provided advice to Venezuelan president Hugo Chávez. In 2004, she married Canadian economist Michael A. Lebowitz.

The New York Times described her as "one of the most influential Marxist theorists in the Latin American left".

Harnecker died from cancer on June 14, 2019.

== Writing ==
Harnecker wrote over 80 books, including The Basic Concepts of Historical Materialism and The Left after Seattle. Jorge G. Castañeda wrote that The Basic Concepts of Historical Materialism "had far-reaching impact. The condensed, synthetic and accessible Marxist textbook was essential reading for university students during the 1970s and early 1980s. It has since sold nearly one million copies in Spanish and Portuguese, and is considered one of the best-selling non-fiction books ever published in Latin America".

Her more recent books, including Hugo Chavez Frias: Un hombre, un pueblo, Venezuela: Militares junto al pueblo, and Venezuela: una revolución sui generis, reflected her support of the Bolivarian revolution. On 15 August 2014, Harnecker accepted the 2013 Liberator's Prize for Critical Thought for her book A World To Build, which was published in English in January 2015.

== Selected works ==
- Harnecker, Marta (1986): La Revolución Social: Lenin y América Latina, Siglo Veintiuno Editores, 307 p.. ISBN 968-23-1385-6
- Harnecker, Marta (1990): América Latina, izquerda y crisis actual: Izquierda y crisis actual, Siglo Veintiuno Editores, 305 p.. ISBN 968-23-1635-9
- Harnecker, Marta (1999): Haciendo posible lo imposible: La izquierda en el umbral del siglo XXI, Siglo Veintiuno Editores, 429 p.. ISBN 968-23-2187-5
- Harnecker, Marta (2010): Ideas for the Struggle, Socialist Interventions Pamphlet Series.
- Harnecker, Marta (2015): A World to Build, Monthly Review Press. ISBN 978-1-58367-467-3.
