= Thomas von der Vring =

German politician

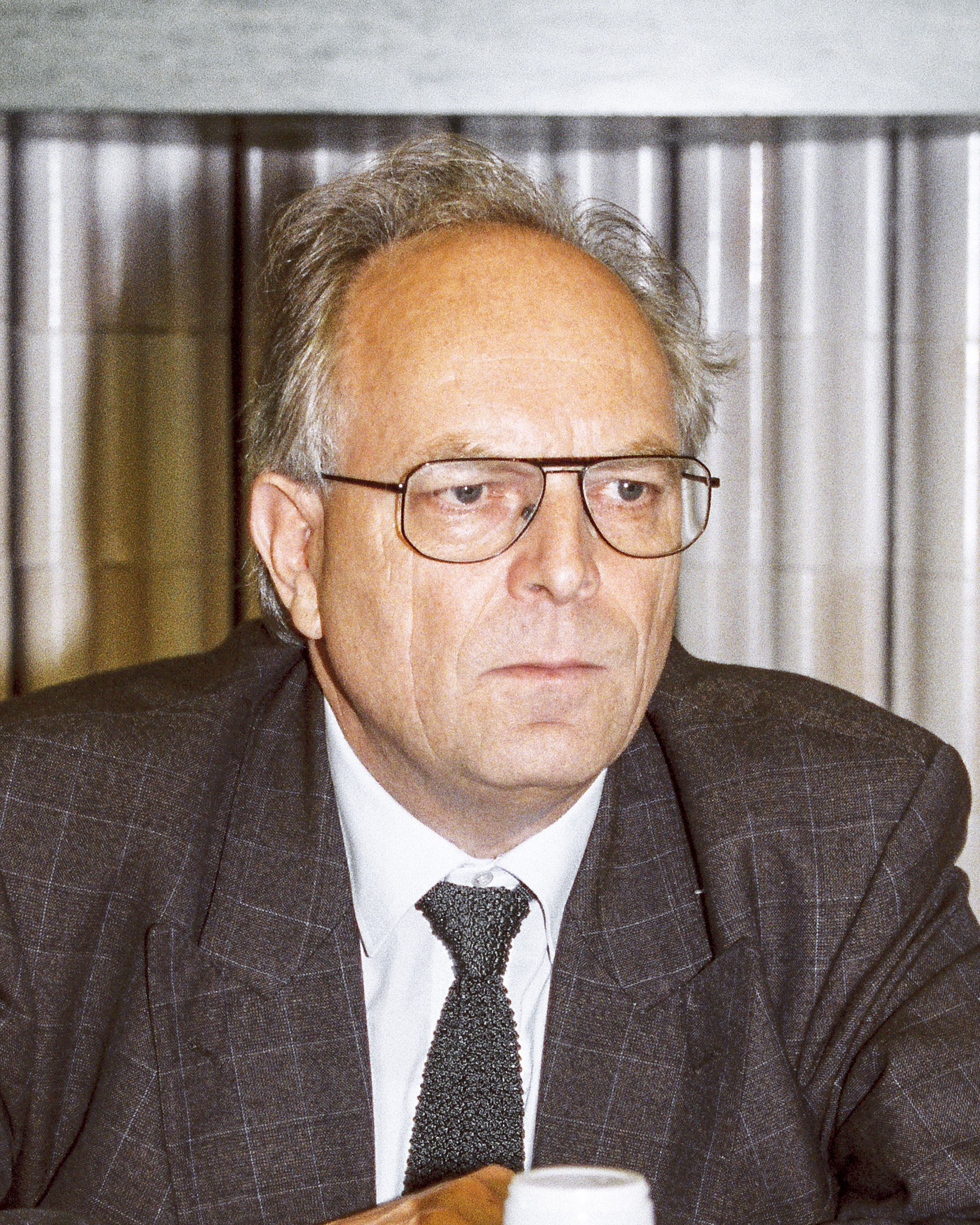
- Von der Vring in 1993

Member of the European Parliament
- In office 17 July 1979 – 18 July 1994
- Constituency: Germany

Personal details
- Born: 27 May 1937 (age 89) Stuttgart, Württemberg, Germany
- Party: Social Democratic Party of Germany
- Occupation: Historian, sociologist, economist

Thomas von der Vring is a German politician. From 1979 to 1994 he served as a Member of the European Parliament (MEP), representing Germany for the Social Democratic Party. From 1989 to 1994 he served as Chair of the Committee on Budgets.

He went to school from 1943 to 1957. From 1957 to 1963 he studied history, sociology and national economy in Munich and Frankfurt. In 1963 he graduated in Frankfurt.
