= Maritime sociology =

Maritime sociology is a sub-discipline of sociology studying the relationship of human societies and cultures to the oceans and the marine environment as well as related social processes. Subjects studied by maritime sociology are human activities at and with the sea such as seafaring, fisheries, maritime and coastal tourism, off-shore extraction, deep-sea mining, or marine environmental conservation. Institutions and discourses related to those activities are also studied by the sub-discipline. Another area of study is the societal-natural relations in the marine realm such as, for instance, the problem of over-fishing or the social consequences of climate change. In sum, maritime sociology conceptualizes the oceans as a social rather than a merely natural space.

== Relation to other sociological disciplines ==
Maritime sociological research is often closely related, uses theories and methods of and collaborates with other sub-disciplines such as sociology of work or environmental sociology.

== Schools and institutions ==
Although it is almost as old as the sociological discipline itself, maritime sociology has not been institutionalized to any great extent to date and is practiced by various more or less independent schools around the world. Currently, there are efforts within the research community to establish maritime sociology as an independent sub-discipline.

- The Polish universities of Szczecin, Gdansk, and Poznan are national centers of research mainly in the sociology of maritime professions. After the second world war, when the Polish coastline had increased significantly due to the outcome of the war, maritime matters became important subject of political and scientific discourse in Poland leading to the establishment of maritime sociology.
- From 1985 to 1992, there was a working group at the Institute of Sociology at Christian-Albrechts-University in Kiel, Germany that aimed to establish maritime sociology in Germany.
- Several Chinese universities (Ocean University, Shanghai Ocean University) conduct research in and operate institutes of maritime sociology. The discipline was also institutionalized in the Chinese academic landscape by founding a professional committee in the Chinese Sociological Association in 2010.
- Since 2009, research streams on maritime sociology take place regularly at the biannual conference of the European Sociological Association
- Centers in Canada are the Memorial University in Newfoundland, Dalhousie University, St. Francis Xavier University, University of British Columbia and the University of Toronto. These Canadian research efforts mainly focus on environmental aspects of the human-ocean relation and fisheries research.

== Theoretical positions ==
Until now, there is no established theoretical framework or overarching paradigm of maritime sociology. Sociological studies in maritime subjects share the identity of dealing with subjects related to the sea rather than a common theoretical ground. With the exception of Janiszewski's concept of marinization, maritime sociologists borrow theoretical approaches from other sociologies to apply them to their field.

=== Marinization ===
Since the 1970s, the Polish sociologist Ludwik Janiszewski's developed the theory of "marinization" (Polish: "Marynizacja"). Analogous to ideas like industrialization, urbanization, or digitalization, the notion describes a historical process or tendency of increasing entanglement of terrestrial societies with the maritime realm, or a tendency of growing importance of relations with and the use of the sea for human societies.

=== Critical political economy of oceans ===
Scholars using the critical political economy approach draw on theories about the interaction of the capitalist mode of production with the ocean in the Marxist tradition. One strand of this approach is concerned with environmental and sustainability issues, using social-ecological theories such as social metabolic analysis. John Hannigan criticizes that its proponents fail to conceptualize the ocean as a distinct social space but, instead, remain in a terrestrial bias applying the categories of land-based society to the maritime realm.

Another strand under the umbrella of critical political economy focuses on the role of the sea with regard to international trade, migratory movements of people, and relations of maritime labor, and piracy. An early publication of this research direction was Steinberg's book "The Social Construction of the Ocean". A recent publication exploring the sociology of the oceans from a critical political economy perspective is presented by Liam Campling and Alejandro Colás: "[...] we aim to demonstrate how capitalism has transformed the spatial relationship between land and sea in ways that has made them both increasingly interdependent and resolutely differentiated."

=== Posthumanist and postmodern theories ===
Recently, a number of maritime sociology researchers draw on theories of posthumanism and postmodernism to conceptualize human-ocean relations. In the sense of Actor-Network-Theory and the works of feminist scholar Donna Haraway, they argue for transcending the separation of nature and society, conceptualizing the oceans as a "hybrid" instead of viewing it separately as a social and natural space.

== Fields of research ==
Examples of maritime-sociological research and theory building include:

- Ferdinand Tönnies' empirical study of the social situation of dockworkers and seafarers in Northern-German seaports.
- Norbert Elias' work on the origins of the naval profession in England
- The academic controversy weather the ship is a total institution. While most maritime scholars studying seafaring subscribe to the notion, there is also critique on the application of the concept arguing that a merchant ship is not a disciplinary institution and can therefore not be adequately be described in these terms.
- The works of the Seafarers International Research Centre (SIRC) at Cardiff University. The members of the research center conduct research in the social situation of global seafarers in the world's merchant fleets.

== Related Journals ==
Currently, there are no scientific journals exclusively dedicated to the subject of maritime sociology. Below is a list of interdisciplinary journals covering the subject:

- Asia-Pacific Journal of Marine Science & Education
- Constanta Maritime University Annals
- Marine Policy
- Maritime Policy & Management
- Maritime Studies
- Pomorstvo. Scientific Journal of Maritime Research
- Roczniki Socjologii Morskiej. Annals of Maritime Sociology (1986-2016)
- WMU Journal of Maritime Affairs
