= The Class Struggle in the Ancient Greek World =

Book by G. E. M. de Ste. Croix

- Cover of the first edition
- Author: G. E. M. de Ste. Croix
- Language: English
- Subject: Ancient Greece
- Publisher: Cornell University Press
- Publication date: 1981
- Publication place: United Kingdom
- Media type: Print (Hardcover and Paperback)
- Pages: 732 (1989 edition)
- ISBN: 0-8014-1442-3 (hardcover); 0-8014-9597-0 (paperback)
- LC Class: 81-66650

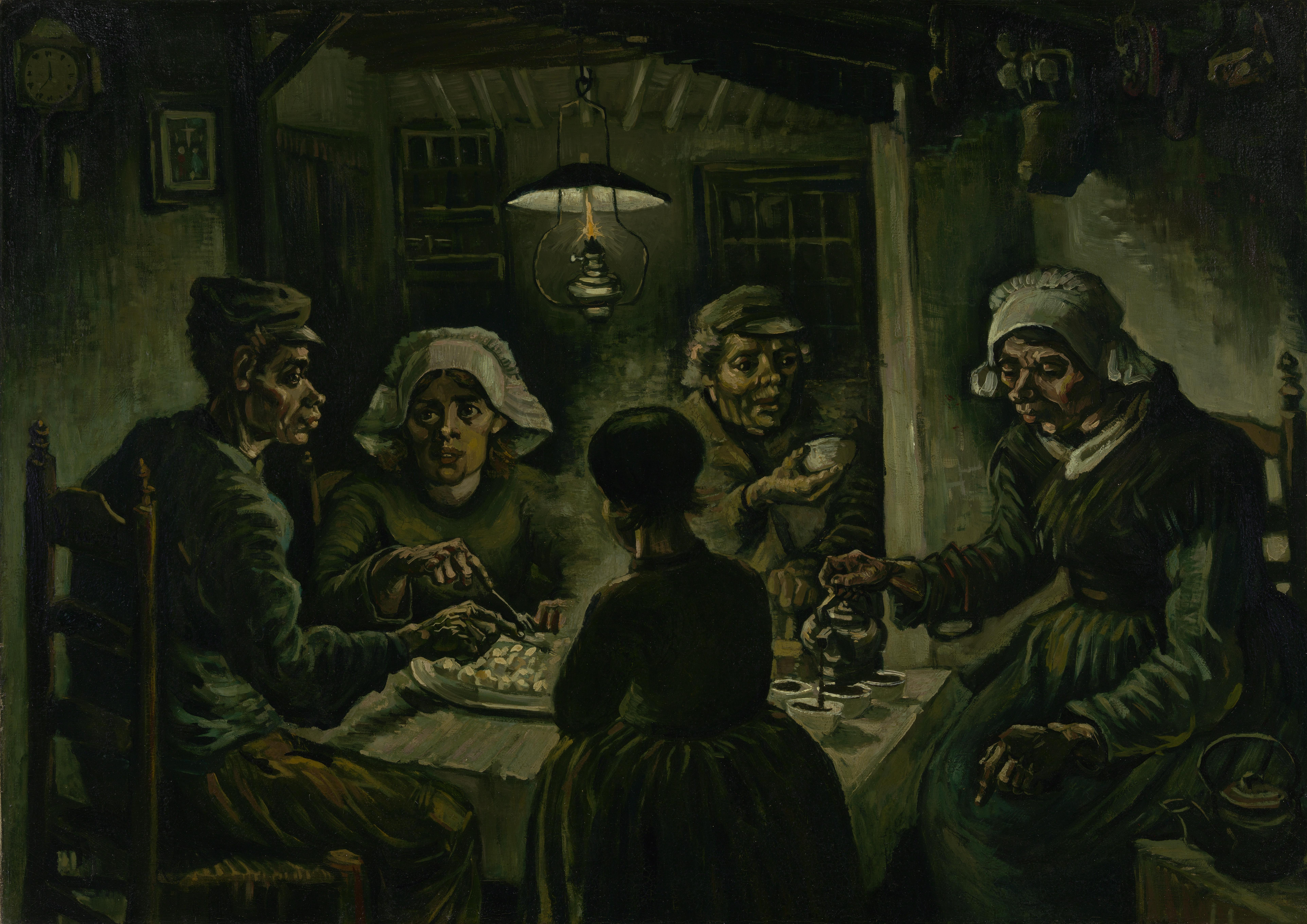
Aardappeleters ("The Potato Eaters"; 1885) by Vincent van Gogh. G. E. M. de Ste. Croix used the picture as the frontispiece for The Class Struggle in the Ancient Greek World.

The Class Struggle in the Ancient Greek World from the Archaic Age to the Arab Conquests is a 1981 book by the British classical historian G. E. M. de Ste. Croix, a fellow of New College, Oxford. The book became a classic of Marxist historiography.

== Summary ==
Ste. Croix makes a wide-ranging attempt to establish the validity of historical materialist analysis of the ancient world, among other historical periods. He begins with the attempt to define exactly what terms such as "class", "exploitation", and "surplus" mean, in the sense they were used by Karl Marx.

Addressing diverse historical periods, Ste. Croix covers questions as varied as the emergence of democracy in Ancient Athens and the social importance of the decline of the Greek city-state during the Roman Empire. In defending the viability of 'class struggle' as an analytical framework applicable to the ancient world, Ste. Croix claims that Marx's conceptions are remarkably close to Aristotle's political philosophy and Thucydides' historiography. He cites numerous fourth and fifth-century BC sources to argue that Greek writers themselves (including Plato) saw political tendencies rooted ultimately in economic interests.

There is also lengthy discussion of the significance of the mode by which surplus value is generated. Ste. Croix argues that a mode of surplus extraction, a concept devised by Marx, is significant and is not necessarily the same as the mode of production engaged in by the majority of a population.

== Reception ==
The Class Struggle in the Ancient Greek World has received much scholarly attention: more, according to Paul Cartledge, than almost any other work of ancient history since George Grote and Theodore Mommsen. It was soon seen as a classic of Marxist historiography, credited with bringing the Classical world back to holding a key position in Marxist history. The work was praised by Mark Golden for showing how a Marxist analysis can help explain the historical process.

The work was criticised by Yvon Garlan for involving a fundamentalist reading of Marx, though Paul Cartledge disagreed with this analysis, praising Ste. Croix for his avoiding dogmatically following Marx. Marxists in the Anglo-Saxon world are said to have welcomed the author's idiosyncratic revisionist interpretation that reduced the meaning of class struggle to exploitation by removing the question of class consciousness (Ste. Croix professed his ignorance of Western Marxism). Other critics have noted that the book failed to address the position of metics in ancient Greek society, and have queried Ste. Croix's characterisation of women as a separate class in the ancient world. Perry Anderson, for instance, argued that reproduction is not a form of production in the Marxist sense, and so Ste. Croix's contention that women counted as a separate class was inaccurate.

Other than Perry Anderson, Paul Cartledge and Mark Golden, sympathetic reviewers included Robert Browning, Peter Brunt and David Konstan. Browning described it as "a very English and pragmatic book, which may well infuriate some Marxist readers". The writer Beryl Bainbridge declared it her favourite book of 1981 for being "pro-women and anti-Christian".

== Translations ==
In a preface to the 1993 Greek translation, Ste. Croix praised Branko Horvat's 1982 The Political Economy of Socialism and expressed his hope for a classless society distinct from the Eastern bloc socialism.

== Sources ==
- Parker, Robert (2001), "Geoffrey Ernest Maurice de Ste. Croix 1910–2000" (PDF), Proceedings of the British Academy, 111: 447–78, archived (PDF) from the original on 10 June 2024
