= The Inheritance of Rome =

2009 history book by Christopher Wickham

The Inheritance of Rome Illuminating the Dark Ages 400–1000
- Author: Christopher Wickham
- Subject: Medieval studies
- Publisher: Viking Adult
- Publication date: 30 July 2009
- Media type: Print
- Pages: 688 pp (hardcover)
- ISBN: 978-0670020980

The Inheritance of Rome: Illuminating the Dark Ages 400–1000 is a 2009 history book by English historian Christopher Wickham at the University of Oxford. It is a broad history of the Early Middle Ages, the period after what is commonly called the fall of the Western Roman Empire (though multiple reviewers argue Wickham is critical of the view that Rome fell). The book received mostly positive reviews.

== Reception ==
A reviewer at the University of Oxford said Wickham's analysis is potent for challenging "two of the predominant misconceptions held about the Middle Ages; firstly, that the 10 centuries or so that spanned between the fall of Rome and Renaissance were wholly unsophisticated and brutal [...] and secondly that this period acted as the birthing of what we may call a 'modern nation'". The reviewer also called the book "remarkably easy to pick up and read [...] a gentle but engaging introduction into [the] period".

John R. Vallely of the Historical Novel Society said that while the book is for somewhat knowledgeable readers rather than novices, such readers "will be impressed at his analysis of a world staggered by political turbulence but resilient in its response". Tyler Cowen lauded it as one of the best history books he had ever read, praising its "[fluid] integration of historical and archeological sources" and its "illuminating discussion of how family control made it incentive-compatible to invest so much wealth in monasteries", among other things.

In The Telegraph, Dominic Sandbrook dubbed The Inheritance of Rome a "worthy competitor" to Gibbon's history, commending "Wickham's awe-inspiring command of his sources" and "vast geographical and comparative range, so that we get a sense not just of one society, but of half a dozen or more". He called the author "a pithy and compelling guide through the narrative complexities of Constantinople politics" and praised Wickham for showing how both the Byzantium and the Abbasid Caliphate "were the heirs of Rome". Sandbrook described the book as "a superlative work of historical scholarship" that illuminates murky corners of the time period.

The Independent's Boyd Tonkin wrote that "this epic of European history between 400 and 1000AD leaves no cliché unchallenged". He said that "gripping as Wickham's narratives prove from Scotland to Byzantium, his impatience with myth for a time leaves us with history as one damn thing after another. Only at the end does this majestic panorama specify the [...] trends behind the tales". A reviewer for Publishers Weekly billed the book as "a magisterial narrative of the political, economic, cultural and religious fabrics [...] Wickham's achievement contributes richly to our picture of this often narrowly understood period."

A reviewer for The New Yorker asserted that while "a single volume [...] using only a slender and unreliable documentary record and no narrative crutches, [covering] six centuries and at least seven major rival powers" sounds like an historiographical stunt, Wickham "largely pulls it off". He credits Wickham with striking comparisons such as valuations in Ireland (slave women and cows) versus valuations in other early medieval societies (coins). Matthew Hoskin, an historian at the University of Edinburgh, wrote a highly positive review in 2014 and described The Inheritance of Rome as a "tour-de-force of narrative history", saying the author makes a large story of interlocking stories readable by "carefully [choosing] not to tell everything at once." He also said that Wickham remembering "the importance of Eastern Europe and the Middle East for the development of history in this period makes it stand out in relation to other books about the era. Indeed, the breadth of The Inheritance of Rome is astounding."

Some reviewers were less enthusiastic. The Guardian's Ian Mortimer praised the book for providing information that challenges common generalizations about the period and said, "The breadth of reading is astounding, the knowledge displayed is awe-inspiring, and the attention quietly given to critical theory and the postmodern questioning of evidence is both careful and sincere." However, Mortimer also argued that Wickham overly stresses the difficulty of knowing the specifics of the period and is too wary about offering interpretations that might face criticism. He also said the author gives too little attention to such aspects of the period as battles, private life, and the aesthetics of artifacts, stating that ultimately "all one can see is blurred masses, not people."

Laura Schneiderman said in Pittsburgh Post-Gazette that Wickham "sheds little light on the murk" and generally presents events without examining motivations behind them. She said that the work "reads like a lengthy academic paper that assumes the reader already knows a great deal about the period", and that the author "organizes his chapters around the points he wants to make rather than around coherent narratives".

Michael Patrick Brady of PopMatters described it as "a very meticulous, overwhelmingly detailed account [...] It is, at times, exhausting and cluttered, but also laden with interesting passages that shed light on this volatile period". He said that "the most tedious" chapters are those on cultures organized immediately after the Roman Empire's fragmentation, due to the chapters' reliance on archaeological evidence. He criticized the section on the Merovingian era as "replete with names and dates, but utterly lacking in significant context, motivation, or revelation", considering this evidence the Early Middle Ages are indeed a period obscured by a dearth of reliable information despite Wickham's view. Brady called the portions on the more stable polities "a fuller, more colorful depiction of their inner workings [...] much more enlightening", ultimately crediting the author with as thorough a depiction of the time period as is possible.

== Editions ==
- Hardcover, Viking Adult, ISBN 978-0670020980
- Paperback, ISBN 978-0143117421
