= Benno Teschke =

German political scientist

Benno Teschke (born 1967 in Osnabrück, West Germany) is a German international relations theorist. He is professor of International Relations at the University of Sussex. Teschke's scholarship is a contribution to Marxist international relations theory, specifically in the Political Marxism tendency. He obtained his PhD from the London School of Economics in 1999, with a thesis titled The making of the Westphalian state-system: Social property relations, geopolitics and the myth of 1648.

== Bibliography ==
- Teschke, Benno, "The Myth of 1648: Class, Geopolitics and the Making of Modern International Relations", Verso, London, 2003.

Awards
Preceded by Brian Kelly	Deutscher Memorial Prize; 2003 Simultaneous Winner; Neil Davidson	Succeeded by Michael Lebowitz
