= Ben Fine =

British economist (born 1948)

Ben Fine (born 1948) is Professor of Economics at the University of London's School of Oriental and African Studies.

== Background ==
Fine was born in Coventry in 1948. One of six brothers, he and all but one other followed their father and studied mathematics at the University of Oxford. Fine graduated at the age of 20, and then was recruited by Sir James Mirrlees, completing an economics degree. He took his doctorate in economics at the London School of Economics, under the supervision of Amartya Sen, in 1974. He moved to the newly established economics department at Birkbeck, University of London, later working part-time as an industrial economist at the Greater London Council prior to its abolition. He was a member of the Social Science Research Committee of the UK’s Food Standards Agency, that met until 2016. Currently, Ben Fine is emeritus professor of economics at the Department of Economics at SOAS, University of London. He is on the Economists' Oversight Group of the Citizens' Economic Council of the Royal Society of Arts, Commerce and Manufacturing (RSA).

== Contributions ==
Fine initially worked on social choice theory, which later informed several studies of consumer choice and consumption patterns. He developed the 'systems of production' framework to understand the ways in which goods are produced and consumed, working with E. Leopold. Latterly he turned to understanding labour economics and inequalities in South Africa's extractives sector, based on some earlier work on the British coal industry, which was in decline.

He is the author of a number of works in the broad tradition of Marxist economics, and has made contributions on economic imperialism and critiques of the concept of social capital. Perhaps his most significant book to date is Marx's 'Capital' (6th ed. 2016, first ed. 1975), with Alfredo Saad-Filho. His work is cited over 39,000 times (Google Scholar, 2018) and his books have been translated into thirteen languages.

He has advised UNCTAD, UNDESA, UNDP, UNRISD, and Oxfam and served as an expert advisor on President Nelson Mandela's 1995-1996 South African Labour Market Commission.

== Recognition ==
- Gunnar Myrdal Prize, European Association for Evolutionary Political Economy (Dimitris Milonakis and Ben Fine, for From Political Economy to Economics, 2009).
- In September 2019 a plaque was unveiled in Ben Fine's honour at the Wits School of Governance, University of Witwatersrand, Johannesburg in recognition of Fine's contribution as an academic economist and policy activist to the South African anti-apartheid struggle.

== Selected bibliography ==
- Fine, Ben and Ourania Dimakou (2016) Macroeconomics: A Critical Companion. London: Pluto.
- Fine, Ben and Alfredo Saad-Filho (2016) Marx's Capital. London: Pluto, sixth edition (first edition 1975).
- Fine, Ben (2016) Microeconomics: A Critical Companion. London: Pluto Press.
- (2013)The Coal Question: Political Economy and Industrial Change from the nineteenth century to the present day Routledge Revival. (reprint)
- Fine, Ben and Alfredo Saad-Filho (2012) CA-PI-TAL!:Introduction à l’économie politique de Marx. Paris: Raisons d’agir Éditions.
- Fine, Ben (2010) Women's Employment and the Capitalist Family. London: Routledge Revival.
- Labour Market Theory: A Constructive Reassessment, Routledge, 2010
- From Political Economy to Economics, (with D Milonakis) Routledge, 2009
- From Economic Imperialism to Freakonomics (with D Milonakis), Routledge, 2009
- Theories of Social Capital: Researchers Behaving Badly, Pluto, 2009
- The World of Consumption Routledge, 2002
- Social Capital versus Social Theory: Political Economy and Social Science at the Turn of the Millennium (Contemporary Political Economy) Routledge (2001)
- The Political Economy of Diet, Health and Food Policy, Routledge, 1998
- South Africa's Political Economy: From Minerals-Energy Complex to Industrialisation (with Z Rustomjee), Wits University Press, 1997.
- Fine, Ben and Michael Heasman and Judith Wright (1995) Consumption in the Age of Affluence: The World of Food. London: Routledge.
- The Peculiarities of the British Economy (with L Harris et al.), Lawrence and Wishart, 1985
- Class Politics: An Answer to its Critics, (with other authors) (1985)
- Macroeconomics and Monopoly Capitalism (with A Murfin), Wheatsheaf, 1984
- Economic Theory and Ideology Edward Arnold, 1980
- Theories of the Capitalist Economy Edward Arnold, 1982
- Rereading Capital (with L Harris), Macmillan, 1979

Edited Books

- Making Democracy Work: a Framework for Macroeconomic Policy in South Africa Joint contributing editor, Cape Town, CDS, 1994
- Development Policy in the 21st Century: Beyond the post-Washington Consensus, Routledge With C Lapavitsas and J Pincus (eds) 2001
- The New Development Economics: after the Washington Consensus, ed with K.S. Jomo, Zed Press 2006
- Beyond the Developmental State: Industrial Policy into the 21st Century co-ed with J Saraswati and D Tavasci, Pluto, 2013

Awards
Preceded by Kees van der Pijl	Deutscher Memorial Prize; 2009; With: Dimitris Milonakis	Succeeded by David Harvey
