= Private healthcare in the United Kingdom =

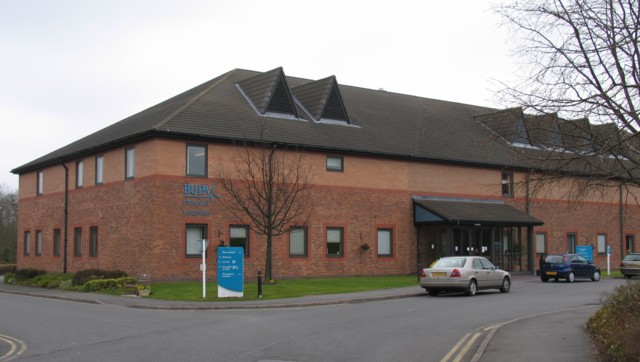
A private hospital in Leicester, operated by BUPA

Private healthcare in the UK, where universal state-funded healthcare is provided by the National Health Service, is a niche market.

Private healthcare services are normally provided as a top-up for NHS services (free of charge) or funded by employers through medical insurance as part of a benefits package to employees. Most private care is for specialist referrals from the NHS. Private healthcare has cut waiting times for some patients.

== Demand ==
According to LaingBuisson in 2018, the total private acute healthcare market is worth £1.47 billion (not including consulting or diagnostic work outside hospitals) and 40% of the demand is in London. NHS trusts in London increased their income from private patient units by 8.1% to £360 million in 2016 and now had a majority of the business of providing healthcare to embassies based in London. Eighteen trusts in London had private patient units in 2018.

The inability of the NHS to meet waiting time targets for planned surgery led to an increase in the numbers paying personally for private operations. Personal payment for acute medical care increased by 53% between 2012 and 2016, from £454 million to £701 million, excluding cosmetic surgery or costs covered by health insurance. This was particularly marked in orthopaedics and cataract surgery where NHS treatment was increasingly rationed.

Repatriation of NHS activity has led to declining revenues from the NHS. Dissatisfaction with the NHS was said by LaingBuisson to be the primary driver of self-pay demand in 2018, though cosmetic surgery still accounted for a quarter of all self-pay revenue. In London there was a 3% decline in revenue for the 25 private hospitals and clinics in 2017, because of fewer clients from the Middle East. Overseas patients coming to London are more likely to choose the 12 private patient units run by NHS hospital trusts and more likely to be looking for cancer treatment than orthopaedics.

In 2018 75% of private healthcare for UK based patients was funded by private health insurance. About 40% of the work in private provincial hospitals was orthopaedics, but consultants in other specialties were not comfortable with the facilities available or the level of experience of staff, so patients with private insurance outside London were often advised to opt for NHS treatment. London private hospitals treated the vast majority of patients coming from abroad.

=== Conflict of interest ===
481 medical consultants, 73% of them NHS employees, owned shares in 34 joint ventures with for-profit healthcare companies in 2020. This generated £31 million in dividends for them, an average dividend of £11,600 a year, over the previous 6 years according to research by the Centre for Health and the Public Interest. The medical consultants who are part of these joint ventures receive a share of the profits of the company as a dividend, giving them a vested interest in the success of the business. As the researchers point out "there is a potential conflict of interest when NHS Trusts contract with the companies which are engaged in joint venture businesses with the Trusts' own medical consultants." The commonest speciality for these consultants was oncology - 71 of them. Orthopedic and general surgeons were the second and third most common. 15 of the joint ventures involved HCA Healthcare and 342 of the consultants. Between December 2020 and November 2021 NHS Trusts in London paid £36.4 million to HCA Healthcare for cancer services.

=== Forecast ===
The UK private healthcare market was forecast to grow from $11.8bn in 2017 to $13.8bn by the end of 2023. A 40% increase in private hospital capacity in London is expected between 2018-2023. The private hospital patient market in central London in 2019 is calculated at about £1.5 billion a year.

== History ==
The Royal Commission on the NHS reported on private medicine in the UK in 1979. Their report included:

- Registered private hospitals, nursing homes and clinics, some of which also treat NHS patients on a contractual basis;
- Private practice in NHS hospitals, including treatment of private in-patients (in pay beds), out-patients and day-patients;
- Private practice by general medical practitioners, general dental practitioners, and other NHS contractors, including opticians and pharmacists, who provide NHS services but usually also undertake retail or other private work;
- Private practice outside the NHS undertaken by medical and dental practitioners, and other staff such as nurses, chiropodists and physiotherapists, who are qualified for employment in the NHS but choose to work wholly or partly outside it;
- Treatment undertaken by other practitioners not normally employed in the NHS, such as osteopaths and chiropractors.

Expenditure on private health care in the UK in 1976 was estimated at £134 million (excluding abortions, long-term care, and dentistry). That was about 3% of total expenditure on health care in the UK. At that time about 2% of all acute hospital beds and 6% of all hospital beds in England were in private hospitals and nursing homes. The proportions in the rest of the United Kingdom were lower.

As of 2019, private expenditure on healthcare consisted of 20.5% of the total spent on health, a minor increase over the past 15 years. Private insurance expenditure consisted of 2.8% of the total., a trend of minor decline over the past 20 years.

As part of a drive to extend the choice of providers available to patients, the Thatcher government aimed to expand the provision of private medical insurance by providing tax relief to people over 60.

In 2012, the Health and Social Care Act provided the greatest change to the United Kingdom's health care system to date. It led to a number of health contracts being awarded to the private sector, increasing competition and diversity amongst providers.

=== Hospitals ===
The commission reported that there were 1,249 registered private hospitals and nursing homes in the UK with 34,546 beds in 1977. These figures included 117 private hospitals with facilities for surgery. There were at that time 116,564 people aged 65 or over in residential accommodation provided by or on behalf of local authorities, compared with 51,800 patients in NHS hospital departments of geriatric medicine. About 73% of the beds were for medical patients, 15% for surgical, 11% for mental health, and 2% for maternity. There were then about 4,000 beds in the private sector occupied by NHS patients under the care of NHS doctors, about 0.8% of the total beds available to the NHS. About half of abortions were at that time performed in private clinics and nursing homes. In 2021 it was reported that there were about 700 operating theatres in private hospitals, mostly staffed by NHS anaesthetists and surgeons working evenings and weekends. Few private hospitals had intensive care facilities for emergencies.

NHS consultants who undertook private practice were permitted, if facilities were available, to admit their private patients to designated private beds ("pay beds") of which there were then 4,859 in NHS hospitals or as day patients, or to see them as outpatients. 42.8% of all NHS consultants worked part-time, mostly because they undertook private practice. Part-time consultants on average derived about one-third of their income from private practice.

The Health Services Act 1976 established an independent Health Services Board to be responsible for the progressive withdrawal from NHS hospitals of pay beds. In 1979 the number had reduced to 2,968 from a figure of 7,188 in 1956. The Commission was told that the existence of private practice within the NHS facilitated and encouraged abuse, chiefly by patients avoiding waiting lists. Pay beds were at that time very controversial, but the view of the Commission was "We do not consider the presence or absence of pay beds in NHS hospitals to be significant at present from the point of view of the efficient functioning of the NHS".

=== Primary care ===
In 1971/2, about 2% of general practitioners’ income was derived from hospital, local authority and non-NHS public sector work, and about 6% from private practice. As Health Secretary Matt Hancock pointed out in 2018, "almost all GP practices are private companies". They work for the NHS under contract and, rather unusually for private contractors, have access to the NHS pension scheme. Dentists, opticians and pharmacies are also private contractors, but do not have access to the pension scheme.

In 1977, some 11% of general dental practitioners' time was spent on work other than in the general dental service, probably mainly on private practice.

There were about 1.12 million subscribers to provident schemes in 1978, of whom 869,000 were members of group schemes. Subscriptions often cover more than one person and in 1978 a total of 2.39 million people were covered.

In March 2019 the Care Quality Commission revealed that of the private primary care services it had inspected of 32 out of 66 consulting doctor services and 16 out of 38 slimming clinics did not provide safe care. They were particularly concerned with the safety and efficacy of prescribing of high-risk medicines including opioid painkillers, antibiotics, unlicensed and clinically ineffective medicines and with poor communication between the private services and NHS GPs.

== Private income for NHS trusts ==
When NHS foundation trusts were established, they were required to limit the proportion of their private income to the level it had been in 2006. For many this was zero. The average across England was 2%, but levels at teaching hospitals, especially in London, were considerably higher. 18 NHS hospitals in London run wards for private patients. The Health and Social Care Act 2012 permitted foundation trusts to raise their private income to 49% of the total. Only The Royal Marsden NHS Foundation Trust, which hopes to raise 45% of its income from private patients and other non-NHS sources in 2016/7 and is trying to raise its income from paying patients from £90m to £100m, is anywhere near the 49% limit. the total private income of NHS trusts in England was £599.1 million in 2016-17 and £626 million in 2017-18. The top 10 earning trusts, all in London, contributed £381.1 million to the 2017-18 total. Private income of trusts outside London fell. It is unclear how much profit is made on this work.

The Imperial College Healthcare NHS Trust and Moorfields Eye Hospital NHS Foundation Trust have both opened clinics in Dubai. There are some joint ventures between NHS trusts and private providers. HCA Healthcare has run a specialist private cancer unit in partnership with The Christie NHS Foundation Trust in Manchester since 2010. About 25% of patients using private services came from overseas.

In June 2019 Warrington & Halton Hospitals NHS Foundation Trust was advertising that patients could pay privately for operations on the NHS treatments blacklist, but withdrew the advertisement after widespread criticism. In July it was reported that several other trusts were offering similar services. NHS England warned all trusts: "We do not expect NHS providers to offer these interventions privately."

== NHS use of the private sector ==
Jeremy Hunt points out that "independent hospitals fish from the same pool of doctors for their workforce" so relying on the private sector sucks doctors and nurses out of NHS hospitals, making waiting lists even longer.

The 1997 Labour Party manifesto made a specific commitment to end the Conservatives’ internal market in health care, but in government they retained the split between purchasers and providers of healthcare. In 2000 the Labour Government agreed A Concordat with the Private and Voluntary Health Care Provider Sector with the Independent Healthcare Association. The intention was to increase capacity, particularly in elective care, where private provision was used to bring down waiting lists, in critical care, and in intermediate care facilities. This was followed, in April 2002,by the introduction of prospective payment with nationally set prices for acute, elective activity under ‘payment by results’. Under patient choice, patients could opt for treatment by a private provider paid by the NHS. The NHS Plan led to the development of independent sector treatment centres which provide fast, pre-booked surgery and diagnostic tests for NHS funded patients separating scheduled treatment from emergency care. These centres played a role in reducing the price paid for ‘spot purchases’ with private providers. Previously when the NHS had made use of the independent sector on an ad hoc basis, it often paid 40-100% more than the equivalent cost to the NHS. In The NHS Improvement Plan: Putting people at the heart of public services, published in 2004, there was an expectation that the independent sector would supply up to 15% of NHS services by 2008, but this figure was not reached.

Rules to prohibit NHS consultants from charging "top-up fees" to NHS patients for extra services were clarified in 2008 to make it clearer that paying for chemotherapy treatment not available on the NHS would not prevent patients from subsequently accessing NHS treatments.

When the coalition government introduced what became the Health and Social Care Act 2012 it appeared to pave the way for a bigger role for private companies, but take up of private capacity was low. In September 2018 it was said that the private sector in England had the capacity for around 100,000 additional inpatient procedures in the last six months of 2018-19. Although NHS waiting lists had risen significantly there did not appear to be any concrete plans to employ private providers to reduce it. Since early 2017 private provision had been steadily about 6% of the total NHS caseload for elective surgery according to NHS Gooroo. As of recent years, the private sector accounts for approximately 10% of elective care, with this split evenly between NHS funded and private funding of care costs. In 2022, payments from the NHS accounted for approximately 31% of private hospitals' revenue. In 2025 the private sector delivered about 10% of all NHS elective care in England for routine operations such as hip and knee replacements and cataract removal.

=== Controversy ===
The issue of using the private sector for NHS services was an issue in the 2015 United Kingdom general election. The government's position was that "use of the private sector in the NHS represents only 6% of the total NHS budget - an increase of just 1% since May 2010".

One To One Midwives, an independent midwifery company, was investigated by NHS England after the deaths of two babies in 2014. The company offices in Warrington had graffiti reading ‘not NHS’ scrawled on the shutters twice in 2018. The company closed a year later. In 2022 NHS England produced a report critical of how NHS providers dealt with the company, noting a “them and us” culture, a lack of understanding about the service, and concerns that were often “unfounded” being raised about the service.

Some NHS services, such as dentistry, optical care and pharmacy, have always been provided by the private sector and, technically, most GP practices are private partnerships. All the drugs, supplies and equipment used by the NHS are privately provided. Taken together this amounts to around 40% of the NHS budget. In addition some NHS organisations subcontract work to private providers. The NHS accounts for 2013/4 show that £10 billion of the total NHS budget of £113 billion was spent on care from non-NHS providers. The main growth in private provision has been in mental health and community health services.

=== Any Qualified Provider ===
Any Qualified Provider was a government policy intended to encourage all NHS, private, third sector or social enterprise health service providers to compete for contracts on an equal footing.

=== Scotland ===
Scottish health boards spent £130,866,841 on private providers from 2015 to 2018, about 0.5% of the budget compared to 7.3% in NHS England.

== Mental health ==
Private provision of psychiatric beds has been largely financed by the NHS, as few psychiatric patients have the means to finance their own treatment and health insurance does not often extend to mental health. 1,700 beds were closed by NHS mental health trusts from 2011 to 2013. As a result, large numbers of patients are admitted in crisis to private institutions, often in remote locations. The cost is around £500 per day.

Most residential care for children is privately provided on the NHS. In 2019 LaingBuisson predicted annual growth in the market, currently worth about £1.9 billion, of 5.2% for independent providers of NHS-commissioned mental health care between 2018 and 2023 because the NHS is focussing on community services, not institutional care. After series of scandals in services run by Cygnet Health Care, NHS England set up an independent oversight board in October 2019 to scrutinise inpatient mental health, learning disabilities and autism services for children and young people and a taskforce to make a rapid set of improvements in care. The board will be chaired by the Children’s Commissioner for England, Anne Longfield. Simon Stevens said at the launch of the board that a “sometimes-inappropriate” level of private provision in mental health inpatient services should be squeezed “as NHS mental health services expand”.

== Performance ==
One of the criticisms of private care in the UK has been that private providers are not required to produce sufficient information about their services to permit comparison with NHS services. It is suggested that surgery in private hospitals may be dangerous because of inadequate equipment, lack of intensive care beds, unsafe staffing arrangements, and poor medical record-keeping. In 2018 it was reported that about 7,000 patients were transferred to the NHS each year from private facilities due to a lack of facilities to deal with problems in the private sector. Staff who also work for the NHS may not be available for support when needed. Most private hospitals do not have an intensive care unit, so if it is needed an ambulance must be called.

The Care Quality Commission reported in April 2018 that 30% of the 206 independent acute hospitals required improvement, mostly because of a lack of formalised governance procedures.

Information about performance is collected by the Private Healthcare Information Network. They say that only 0.12% of admissions to private hospitals result in an emergency transfer to the NHS. In the 12 months up to September 2023, there were 697 unplanned transfers of privately funded patients to the NHS.

== See also ==
- Healthcare in the United Kingdom
- Private prescriptions
- History of public health in the United Kingdom
- Cosmetic surgery in the United Kingdom
