= Private providers of NHS services =

Outsourcing of UK healthcare systems

The private provision of NHS services has been considered a controversial topic since the early 1990s. Keep Our NHS Public, NHS Support Federation and other groups have campaigned against the threat of privatisation, largely in England.

The 1997 Labour Party manifesto made a specific commitment to end the Conservatives’ internal market in health care, but in government they retained the split between purchasers and providers of healthcare. In 2000 the Labour Government agreed A Concordat with the Private and Voluntary Health Care Provider Sector with the Independent Healthcare Association. The intention was to increase capacity, particularly in elective care, where private provision was used to bring down waiting lists, in critical care, and in intermediate care facilities. This was followed, in April 2002, by the introduction of prospective payment with nationally set prices for acute, elective activity under ‘payment by results’. Under patient choice, patients could opt for treatment by a private provider paid by the NHS. The NHS Plan led to the development of independent sector treatment centres which provide fast, pre-booked surgery and diagnostic tests for NHS funded patients separating scheduled treatment from emergency care. These centres played a role in reducing the price paid for ‘spot purchases’ with private providers. Previously when the NHS had made use of the independent sector on an ad hoc basis, it often paid 40-100% more than the equivalent cost to the NHS. In The NHS Improvement Plan: Putting people at the heart of public services, published in 2004, there was an expectation that the independent sector would supply up to 15% of NHS services by 2008, but this figure was not reached.

Rules to prohibit NHS consultants from charging "top-up fees" to NHS patients for extra services were clarified in 2008 to make it clearer that paying for chemotherapy treatment not available on the NHS would not prevent patients from subsequently accessing NHS treatments.

When the coalition government introduced what became the Health and Social Care Act 2012 it appeared to pave the way for a bigger role for private companies, but the impact of austerity on NHS budgets meant that take up of private capacity was low. In September 2018 it was said that the private sector in England had the capacity for around 100,000 additional inpatient procedures in the last six months of 2018-19. Although NHS waiting lists had risen significantly there did not appear to be any concrete plans to employ private providers to reduce it. Since early 2017 private provision had been steadily about 6% of the total NHS caseload for elective surgery according to NHS Gooroo.

== Expenditure ==
The UK has the fifth largest share of healthcare financed through government schemes out of the 36 OECD member states.

According to the Department of Health and Social Care a total of £9.2 billion was paid to private providers in England in 2018-9, or about 7% of the departmental budget (it would be a larger proportion of the NHS budget). This clearly does not include what is spent on primary care, nor spending on medicines or equipment. It was an increase of 14% compared to 2014-15. They report a further £3.43 billion paid to the voluntary and not-for-profit sector and to local councils. These figures are said by the Centre for Health and the Public Interest to be misleading. They calculate the proportion of the NHS budget spent on non-NHS providers as about 26%, about £29 billion. This is managed through 53,000 individual contracts. The official departmental figures distinguish between the ‘independent sector’, the ‘voluntary sector’, the ‘private sector’, and ‘local authorities’. The money paid to local authorities is intended for social care, which is largely privately provided. NHS England spent a further £830 million on social care directly in 2018-9. There is no definition of the ‘independent sector’ or the ‘voluntary sector’. Many private providers are registered charities. Furthermore only services directly commissioned by clinical commissioning groups are included. Services subcontracted by NHS trusts - most commonly elective surgery - are not included. £1.3 billion was spent in this way in 2018-9.

== Primary care ==
Since the establishment of the NHS in 1948 most primary care - general practice, dentistry, opticians and pharmacy - has been provided by private contractors, whose staff are not NHS employees. General practitioners, like the other contractors, run businesses, but, unlike them, their income is almost entirely derived from the NHS under the General Medical Services Contract, they are covered by the NHS pension scheme and their services are free to registered patients.

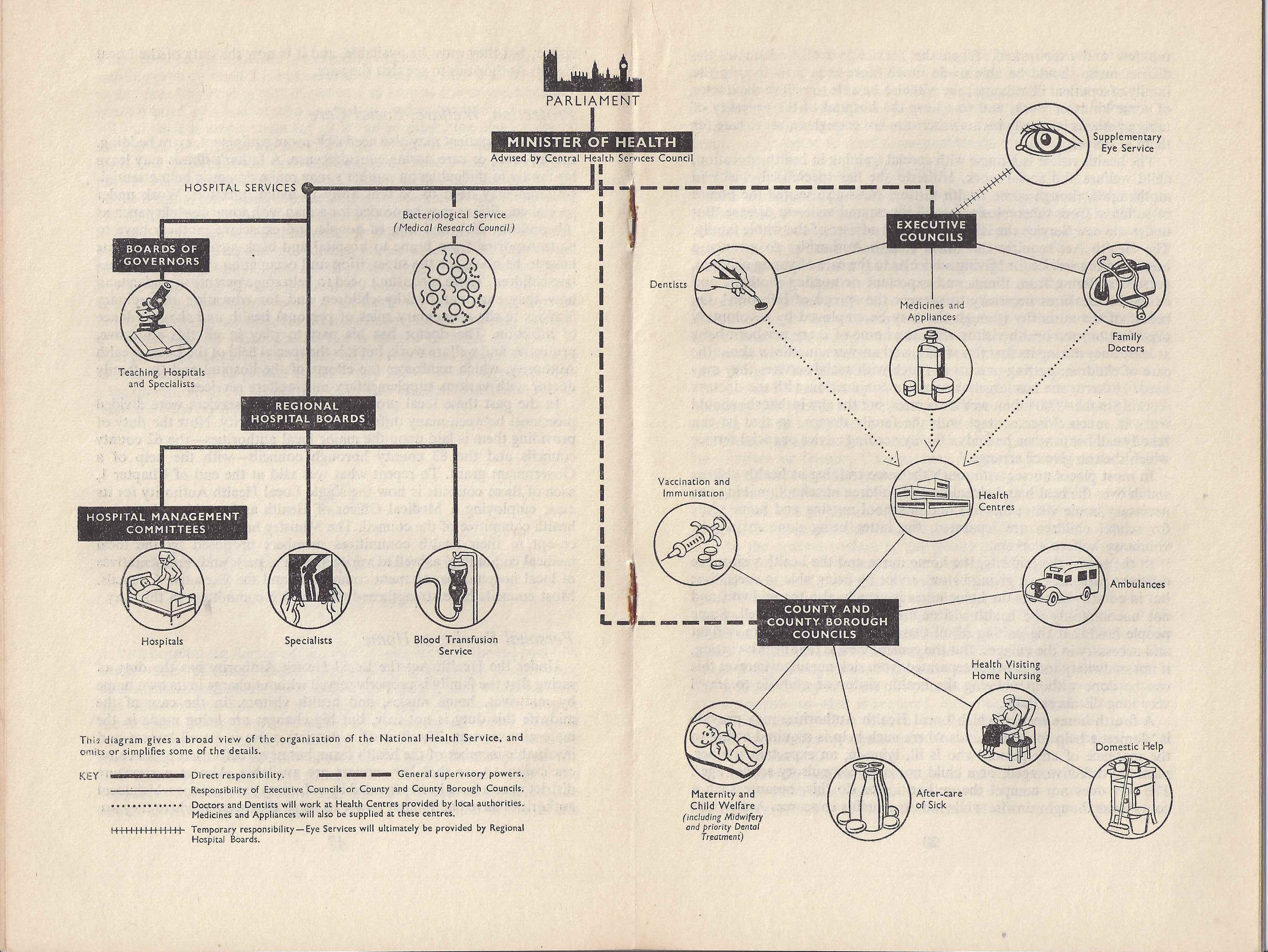
Diagram produced in 1948 to explain the NHS structure

Initially the contracts for these private providers were managed by local Executive Councils. In the 1974 reorganisation they were replaced by family practitioner committees. In 1990 these were abolished and they were replaced by family health services authorities. They are now managed by NHS England which spent £14 billion on them in total 2018/19. £2.9 billion was spent on private dentistry in 2018-19, with about £2.5 billion spent on private optometry and pharmaceutical services, although this sum has been declining.

== Hospital services ==
Campaigning is generally concentrated on hospital services. Large parts of the hospital estate which were previously designated as long-stay geriatric wards were closed in the 1980s and 90s. Such patients were moved to residential care or nursing homes, which are almost entirely privately provided. Previously homes were provided by local authorities but the funding regime was engineered in such a way as to make that unsustainable. Some is regarded as social care, which is means-tested. Continuing healthcare, though paid for by the NHS, is largely privately provided. NHS trusts spot purchasing from private providers, largely to meet NHS targets rose from £645 million in 2013-14 to £1.3 billion in 2018-19. In May 2018 private providers carried out 43,145 NHS day case electives and 7,720 overnight elective procedures. In May 2021 it was 40,700 day cases and 6,715 overnight electives. NHS commissioning expenditure from non-NHS organisations in England increased by 27% to more than £18 billion in 2020-21 under the pressure of the COVID-19 pandemic in England. This includes services provided by social enterprises and charities, as well as private corporations.

If a private hospital is a registered charity it is exempt from business rates although NHS hospitals are not.

Ramsay Health Care UK runs 30 sites providing NHS-funded services. In June 2019 it provided 5,664 inpatient and 6,997 outpatient NHS-funded procedures. It announced in 2019 that NHS referrals had increased by 7.4% and it had benefited from an increase in NHS tariff prices.

Independent providers are represented by the Independent Healthcare Providers Network, which stresses the importance of patient choice.

In 2019 private hospitals carried out 526,000 elective procedures on NHS patients. In 2020 during the COVID-19 pandemic in England that fell to 291,000. In March 2020 NHS England block booked most of the private hospital sector’s services, facilities and nearly 20,000 clinical staff at cost price in a deal brokered by the Independent Healthcare Providers Network to expand capacity during the pandemic. This included about 8,000 hospital beds. This was intended to be used largely for routine surgery. In January 2022 a further three month ‘covid surge deal’ was negotiated where providers agreed that they would suspend their private activity to “make facilities and staff available to the NHS system” in areas where covid patient numbers or staff absences “threatened the NHS’s ability to provide urgent care”. The Independent Healthcare Provider Network said that available staffed capacity in the private sector had simply gone unused. This deal would cost the NHS between £75 million and £90 million each month from January to April. If the capacity needed to be fully utilised payments could double.

== Ambulance services ==
In 2019 the Care Quality Commission reported that ambulance services were relying on private providers because of lack of capacity. Some firms had failed to obtain references or carry out criminal record checks and a lack of staff training was leading to serious patient harm. More than £92 million was spent in 2018/9 on private ambulances and taxis.

== Mental health ==
According to health-services scholar John Lister 30% of all mental health spending in 2018-9 was in the private sector and in child and adolescent mental health services 44%. The boundary between healthcare, which is free, and social care, which is means tested, is quite unclear in this area. The process of deinstitutionalisation, which involved the closure of the large asylums, meant the transfer of patients to community care, much of which is regarded as social care. In 2019 13% of inpatient beds in England were provided by American companies. According to the Candesic consultancy around £1.8 billion of the £13.8 billion spent by the NHS on mental healthcare in 2018, including non hospital services, went to the private sector. About 25% of NHS mental healthcare beds in England were provided by the private sector, and 98% of their earnings came from the NHS.

In August 2022 there were 238 independent NHS mental health providers licensed by the Care Quality Commission in England. 64 were rated either “require improvement” or are considered “inadequate”. Claire Murdoch of NHS England announced a “very major quality improvement programme that will focus hugely on inpatient care, and including very much the independent sector”.

== Controversy ==
The issue of privatisation of health services was a topic of debate during the 2015 United Kingdom general election. The government's main stance is summed up in this quote: "(the) use of the private sector in the NHS represents only 6% of the total NHS budget - an increase of just 1% since May 2010". It is unclear what this statement meant. Some NHS services, such as dentistry, optical care and pharmacy, have always been provided by the private sector and, technically, most GP practices are private partnerships. All the drugs, supplies and equipment used by the NHS are privately provided. Taken together this amounts to around 40% of the NHS budget. In addition some NHS organisations subcontract work to private providers. The NHS accounts for 2013/4 show that £10 billion of the total NHS budget of £113 billion was spent on care from non-NHS providers. The main growth in private provision has been in mental health and community health services.

== Any Qualified Provider ==
Any Qualified Provider was a government policy intended to encourage all NHS, private, third sector or social enterprise health service providers to compete for contracts on an equal footing.

== Scotland ==
Scottish health boards spent at least £130,866,841 on private providers from 2015 to 2018, about 0.5% of the budget compared to 7.3% in NHS England.

== See also ==
- Private medicine in the United Kingdom
