= Ray Bush =

British academic

- Occupation: Professor
- Board member of: Leeds University Centre for African Studies advisory board Deputy chair of the Review of African Political Economy
- Spouse: Mette Wiggen

Academic background
- Education: University of Leeds

Raymond Carey Bush is a professor of African studies at the school of politics and international studies (POLIS) at the University of Leeds. He is a member of the Leeds University Centre for African Studies (LUCAS) advisory board and deputy chair of the Review of African Political Economy (ROAPE). Bush is married to Dr. Mette Wiggen, a fellow academic at POLIS.

== Biography ==
Bush earned his PhD on The colonial factor and social transformation on the Gold Coast to 1930 at the University of Leeds in 1984. He has taught the postgraduate modules Political Economy of Resources and Development and Africa in the Contemporary World since he took over from Morris Szeftel in 2005, and is currently the program manager for the MA in Global Development and Africa. Szeftel and Bush have had a close academic relationship, working together on the editorial board of ROAPE as well as publishing several articles together.

Between 2000 and 2003, Bush worked as a researcher for the United Nations Research Institute for Social Development (UNRISD) on the Civil Society Strategies and Movements for Rural Asset Redistribution and Improved Livelihoods project, which examined the efforts of civil society groups to influence policy and institutional reform. In addition, he is a member of the Global Development and Justice research group at the University of Leeds. Bush has had visiting research appointments at the Norwegian Nobel Institute, Oslo and the Social Science Research Centre, American University in Cairo.

His books include Poverty and Neoliberalism: Persistence and Reproduction in the Global South (2007) and Counter-Revolution in Egypt's Countryside: Land and Farmers in the Era of Economic Reform (2002). He is an outspoken critic of neoliberalism and the capitalist system, and has published extensively on the subject of their negative consequences for communities in developing countries, in particular the effect of gold mining in Ghana and the plight of the Galamsey. Bush is the series editor of Pluto Press series The Third World in Global Politics. Bush has also written for The Guardian with Yao Graham.

== Publications ==
Books

- Bush, RC and Ayeb, H (eds.) (2012) Marginality and Exclusion in Egypt, Zed Books.
- Bush, RC (2007) Poverty and neoliberalism: persistence and reproduction in the global south, Pluto Press.
- Bush, RC (2002) Counter-revolution in Egypt's countryside: land and farmers in the era of economic reform, Zed Books.
- Bush, RC (1999) Economic Crisis and the Politics of Reform in Egypt, Westview Press.
- Bush, RC (with Lionel Cliffe and Jenny Lindsay) (1994), The Transition to Independence in Namibia, Lynne Reinner - Boulder.

Journal Articles

- Bush, R C (2014) "From Arab Spring to the Egyptian Winter?", Leeds African Studies Bulletin, 76, pp. 45–57.
- Bush, R C (2009) "When 'Enough' is not Enough: Resistance during Accumulation by Dispossession". Cairo Papers in Social Science, 29(2/3), pp. 85–99.
- Bush, R (2008) "Scrambling to the Bottom? Mining, Resources and Underdevelopment". Review of African Political Economy, 35(117), pp. 361–366.
- Bush, R (2008) "Africa and globalisation", Leeds African Studies Bulletin 70, pp. 43–52.
- Bush, RC; Keenan, J (2006) "North Africa: Power, Politics & Promise". Review of African Political Economy, 108(33), pp. 175–184.
- Szeftel, M; Bush, RC (2004) "Commentary: Bringing Imperialism Back In". Review of African Political Economy, pp. 165–169.
- Bush, RC (2004) "Commissioning Africa for Globalisation: Blair's project for the world's poor". Global Dialogue, 6(3-4), pp. 14–15.
- Bush, RC (2004) "Poverty and Neo-Liberal Bias in the Middle East and North Africa". Development and Change, 35(4).
- Bush, RC (2004) "Undermining Africa". Historical Materialism, 12(4), pp. 173–201.
- Bush, RC; Abrahamsen, R (2003) "War and the Forgotten Continent". Review of African Political Economy, 30(96), pp. 181–186.
- Bush, RC (2003) "Zimbabwe Out in the Cold?" (editorial). Review of African Political Economy, 30(98), pp. 535–537.
- Bush, RC; Szeftel, M (2002) "Sovereignty, Democracy & Zimbabwe’s Tragedy". Review of African Political Economy, 91(29), pp. 5–12.
- Bush, RC; Mohan, G (2001) "Africa’s Future: That Sinking Feeling". Review of African Political Economy, 88(28), pp. 149–153.
- Bush, RC (2001) "Misir’da siyasi otoritarizm ve tarim reformu (Political authoritarianism and agricultural reform in Egypt)". Toplum ve Bilim, 88, pp. 105–121.
- Bush, RC (2000) "An Agricultural Strategy without Farmers: Egypt's Countryside in the New Millennium". Review of African Political Economy, 84, pp. 235–249.
- Bush, RC; Szeftel, M (2000) "Commentary: The Struggle for Land". Review of African Political Economy, 84, pp. 173–180.
- Bush, RC (1996) "The Politics of Food and Starvation". Review of African Political Economy, 68, pp. 169–195.
- Bush, RC (1995) "Coping with Poverty and Adjustment in Egypt's Countryside". Review of African Political Economy, 66, pp. 499–516.
- Bush, RC (1994) "Crisis in Egypt: Structural Adjustment, Food Security and the Politics of USAID". Capital & Class, 53, pp. 15–37.
- Bush, RC (1) "Egypt’s Agricultural Crisis". Journal of Peasant Studies.
- Bush, RC (1) "Mining for fish".
- Bush, RC; Keenan, J (1) Review of African Political Economy(Editorship). Review of African Political Economy, 108(33).

Chapters in Books

- Bush, R C (2009) "The Land and the People". In: Rabab El-Mahdi&Philip Marfleet (eds), Egypt:The Moment of Change, London & New York: Zed Books, pp. 51–67.
- Bush, R C (2009) "When 'Enough' is not Enough: Resistance during Accumulation by Dispossession". In: Nicholas S. Hopkins (eds.) Political and Social Protest in Egypt, Cairo: American University in Cairo Press, pp. 85–99.
- Bush, RC (2007) "Mubarak’s legacy for Egypt's rural poor: Returning land to the landlords". In: A. Haroon Akram-Lodhi, Saturnino M. Borras, Jr. and Cristóbal Kay (eds.) Land, poverty and livelihoods in the era of globalisation: perspectives from developing and transition countries, Routledge, pp. 254–283.
- Bush, RC (2006) "Staying Hungry: Food Politics in Egypt and the Near East". In: Maha Abdelrahman, Iman A. Hamdy, Malak Rouchdy and Reem Saad (eds), Cultural Dynamics in Contemporary Egypt, The American University in Cairo Press, pp. 156–172.
- Bush, RC (2005) "Crisis of Rural Livelihoods, Economic Reforms and Civil Society in Egypt". In: K B Ghimire (eds), Civil Society and The Market Question: Dynamics of Rural Development and Popular Mobilization, Palgrave Macmillan, pp. 162–188.
- Bush, RC (2004) "Agriculture and Economic Adjustment in Egypt". In: A Haroon Akram-Lodhi and R Chernomas (eds.) Economic Reform in the 21st Century: Neo-Conservative Failure, Governance and Alternative Budgets, Arbeiter Ring Publishing.
- Bush, RC (2003) "Competing views on Policy and Farming in Egypt". In: Eberhard Kienle (ed.), "Politics from Above, Politics from Below: The Middle East in the Age of Economic Reform", Saqi Books.
- Bush, RC (2003) "Modernizing Agriculture or Underdeveloping the Countryside? Competing Views on Policy and Farming in Egypt". In: Eberhard Kienle (ed.), Politics From Above, Politics from Below: The Middle East in the Age of Economic Reform, Saqi.
- Bush, RC (2002) "Economic Adjustment and Agricultural Reform". In: Mustapha Kamel el Sayyid (ed.), Which way forward for Egyptian Agriculture?, Center for the Study of Developing Countries, Cairo University, pp. 15–43.
- Bush, RC (2002) "Land Reform and Counter Revolution". In: Ray Bush (ed.), Counter-Revolution in Egypt's Countryside: Land and Farmers in the Era of Economic Reform, Zed Books, pp. 3–31.
- Bush, RC (2002) 'More Losers than Winners in Egypt’s Countryside: the Impact of Changes in Land Tenure'. In: Ray Bush (ed.), Counter-Revolution in Egypt's Countryside: Land and Farmers in the Era of Economic Reform, Zed Books, pp. 185–210.
- Bush, RC (1998) "Facing Structural Adjustment: Strategies of Peasants, the State, and the International Financial Institutions". In: Nicholas Hopkins and Kirsten Westergaard (eds), Directions of Change in Rural Egypt, The American University in Cairo Press, pp. 88–112.
- Bush, RC (1) "Debating agricultural modernisation". In: Eberhard Keinle (ed.), Economic Liberalisation in the Middle East
