= Carolyn Baylies =

American academic

Carolyn Louise Baylies
- Born: 2 June 1947; 1 November 2003 (aged 56)

Academic background
- Education: University of Wisconsin–Madison

Academic work
- Main interests: Founder of Leeds Centre for Development Studies

Carolyn Louise Baylies (2 June 1947 – 1 November 2003), was an American academic and activist. She was particularly active in the fields of health and sociology of the third world and international development, and especially on the gendered aspects of development. Baylies was particularly notable for her work on the ways in which the AIDS epidemic threatened existing social structures and food security, a connection which she was one of the first to make.

== Early life ==
Baylies was born in Texas and grew up in California.

== Education and career ==
After completing her undergraduate degree in sociology at Berkeley in 1969, she completed a doctorate on Zambian class relations at the University of Wisconsin–Madison, which was awarded in 1978. Following this she took a teaching post at the University of Zambia, during which time she also undertook research on the trade union movement and labour policies.

In 1980 Baylies joined the school of economic studies at the University of Leeds as a research fellow studying the history of the Yorkshire Miners Association, a subject on which she published a book in 1993 entitled History of the Yorkshire Miners, 1881–1918. Her academic pursuits were valued by the University of Leeds, in 1983 she became a lecturer, in 1993, a senior lecturer, and in 2003, reader in the sociology of developing countries. Her work at the university also included her involvement in the founding of the Centre for Development Studies, of which she served as a director for two terms (1990–93, 1997–99). Baylies also helped to shape the University of Leeds' interdisciplinary Master of Arts course in development studies, expanding the capacity for postgraduate research in the field.

Baylies was also involved in the Review of African Political Economy, which she helped to found. She served as a member of ROAPE's editorial working group for over 20 years.

Baylies was married to fellow University of Leeds academic, Dr. Morris Szeftel, with whom she coauthored the book The Dynamics of the One-Party State in Zambia, published in 1984. Baylies and Szeftel had two children.

Baylies died from cancer on 1 November 2003.

== Publications ==
Carolyn Baylies' published work includes:

Books

- Baylies, C., Gertzel, C. and Szeftel. M. 1984. The Dynamics of the One-Party State in Zambia, Manchester: Manchester University Press
- Baylies, C. 1993. The History of the Yorkshire Miners 1881–1918, London: Routledge

Chapters in edited books

- Baylies, C. 1985. "The state and class in post-colonial Africa", in M. Zeitlin (ed.) Political Power and Social Theory, 5, Connecticut: JAI Press, 1–34
- Baylies, C. and Bujra, J. 'Discourses of power and empowerment in the fight against AIDS in Africa", in P Aggleton, P Davies and G Hart (eds.), AIDS Safety, Sexuality and Risk, London: Taylor & Francis, 140–222
- Baylies, C. 1996. "Diversity in patterns of parenting and household formation", in E Silva (ed.), Good Enough Mothering?, London: Routledge, 119–148
- Baylies, C., Bujra, J. et al. 1997. "Rebels at risk: young women and the shadow of AIDS", in C Becker, J-P Dozon, C Obbo and M Toure (eds.), Experiencing and Understanding AIDS in Africa, Dakar and Paris: Codesria/ Editions Karthala/ IRD, 319–341
- Baylies, C and Bujra, J. 1998. "Solidarity and stress: gender and local mobilization in Tanzania and Zambia", in P Aggleton, G Hart & P Davies (eds.), Families and Communities responding to AIDS, London: UCL Press, 35–52
- Baylies, C and Szeftel, M. 1999 'Democratization and the 1991 elections in Zambia", in J Daniel, R Southall and M Szeftel (eds.), Voting for Democracy: Watershed Elections in Contemporary Anglophone Africa, Aldershot: Ashgate, 83–109

Journal articles

- Baylies, C. 1978. "Zambia: Class formation and détente', Review of African Political Economy, 9: 4-26
- Baylies, C. 1979. "The emergence of indigenous capitalist agriculture in Zambia', Rural Africana, 4,5:65-81
- Baylies, C. 1980. "Imperialism and settler capital: friends or foes?', Review of African Political Economy, 18:116-26
- Baylies, C. and Szeftel, M 1982 'The rise of a Zambian capitalist class in the 1970s", Journal of Southern African Studies, 8,2:187-213
- Baylies, C. 1982. "Zambia's economic reforms and their aftermath: the state and the growth of indigenous capital", Journal of Commonwealth and Comparative Politics, XX,3:235-63
- Baylies, C. 1986. "The meaning of health in Africa', Review of African Political Economy, 36:62-73
- Baylies, C. and Szeftel, M. 1992. "The fall and rise of multi-party politics in Zambia", Review of African Political Economy, 54:75-91
- Baylies, C. and Wright, C. 1993. "Female labour in the clothing and textile industry in Lesotho', African Affairs, 92,369:577-591
- Baylies, C. 1995 'Political conditionality and democratisation", Review of African Political Economy, 22, 65: 321–337
- Baylies, C. and Szeftel, M. 1997. "The 1996 Zambian elections: still awaiting democratic consolidation?", Review of African Political Economy, 24, 71: 113–128
- Baylies, C. and Bujra, J. 1997. "Social science research on AIDS in Africa - questions of content, methodology and ethics", Review of African Political Economy, 24, 73: 280–288
- Baylies, C. 1999. "International partnership in the fight against AIDS: addressing need and redressing injustice?", Review of African Political Economy, 26, 81: 387–394
- Baylies, C. 2000. "The impact of HIV on family size preference in Zambia", 'Reproductive Health Matters, 8, 15: 77–86

Editorials

- Baylies, C., Allen, C. and Szeftel M. 1982 'Surviving Democracy?", Review of Africal Political Economy, editorial, 54:3-10
- Baylies, C. and Bujra, J, 1993. "Challenging gender inequalities in Africa", Review of African Political Economy, editorial, 56: 3–10

== See also ==
- Feminist economics
- List of feminist economists
