= Leeds University Centre for African Studies =

Interdisciplinary centre at Leeds University

Leeds University Centre for African Studies (LUCAS) is an interdisciplinary centre at the University of Leeds that was established in 1964, and has members from a variety of faculties who share an interest in African Studies. The English, Geography, History and Politics and International Studies (POLIS) schools at the University of Leeds are all closely linked to LUCAS. The current director is Shane Doyle.

LUCAS runs a seminar series and holds an annual lecture, and invites speakers on a variety of topics around the general theme of Africa. In 2009, LUCAS ran a conference on Democratization in Africa: Retrospective and Future Prospects, which attracted academics from around the world. It is part of Yorkshire African Studies Network (YASN) and from 2017 joined AEGIS (research network).

The centre has close links to the Review of African Political Economy (ROAPE), the deputy chair of which is Ray Bush and the position of chair was previously held by the late Lionel Cliffe. ROAPE hosted a series of panels at LUCAS' 2009 Democratization in Africa Conference.

LUCAS also publishes an annual Leeds African Studies Bulletin, which has been in print since 1964. Its ISSN is 0024-0249. Besides recording activities and other news relating to African studies at Leeds, it contains scholarly articles and book reviews. It has published pieces by many distinguished African writers and Africanist scholars over the years, including Wole Soyinka, Ngũgĩ wa Thiong'o, Jack Mapanje, James Currey, Morris Szeftel, Michael Barratt Brown, Abdulrazak Gurnah, Martin Banham, the late Lionel Cliffe, Ray Bush, Femi Osofisan, James Gibbs, and Jane Plastow.
