= Jatinder Hayre =

British doctor and public health academic

- Alma mater: University of Nottingham
- Profession: Doctor
- Field: Public Health

Jatinder Hayre is a British medical doctor and public health academic, based at the Wolfson Institute of Population Health, Queen Mary University of London. His work examines the social determinants of health and health inequalities. His book, The Lost Generation of COVID‑19, analyses the pandemic’s impact on children and young people. He also engages in health advocacy work.

== Early life and education ==
Born in the Black Country, West Midlands, to a cleaner and metal-worker, Hayre credits his working-class upbringing defining his interest in public health and policy. He graduated from the University of Nottingham after studying medicine, and has remained affiliated with the institution as a research fellow.

== Career ==
=== Clinical practice ===
Hayre practices as a doctor in the National Health Service. He has been a vocal critic on the working conditions in the NHS and has opposed the use and expansion of Physician and Anaesthesia Associates on patient-safety grounds. He was supportive of the industrial action taken by BMA on junior doctor pay.

=== Academic research ===
In 2020, Hayre was commissioned by the Independent SAGE group to lead a report exploring the interaction of the COVID-19 pandemic on health inequality, he was critical of the poor state of social security in the United Kingdom. Hayre's public health work continues at Queen Mary University of London, with a focus on child health inequality, particularly exploring early-years interventions such as the Sure Start programme. In April 2025, Hayre published his book, The Lost Generation of COVID‑19, analysing the health and social impact of the COVID-19 pandemic on children, highlighting the long-term implications and societal impact of inequality. He has proposed the Hayre Doctrine of Weighted Universalism in response to growing child health inequality.

=== Health advocacy ===
Hayre serves as Vice Director of the Socialist Health Association and a previous Co-Chair of The Fabian Society Health Network. He is the National Spokesperson for Keep Our NHS Public. Alongside his academic output, Hayre is a regular commentator on NHS policy and health inequalities, he has written in various media outlets, such as The Independent, City AM, and Jacobin. He is a member of INRICH — leading workshops on reducing child health inequality.
