= Morris Szeftel =

Morris Szeftel is an academic who worked at the University of Leeds and supported the Leeds University Centre for African Studies. He is also a contributing author to the Review of African Political Economy and is an editor of the Journal of Southern African Studies

== Early life and education ==
Szeftel was educated at the universities of Cape Town (BA), Zambia (MA) and Manchester (PhD).

== Academic career ==
Szeftel was (as at 1983) a lecturer in the department of politics at the University of Leeds.

Szeftel taught the postgraduate modules on 'Africa in the Contemporary World' and 'Political Economy of Resources and Development' until 2005 and on 'Business, State and World Economy' and 'The Modern Corporation and the State' at Leeds University's school of politics and international studies (POLIS). He also taught undergraduate courses at Leeds on 'Political Corruption', 'The State and Politics in Africa', 'Government and Politics in India' and 'The Politics of Race, Class and Nationalism in South Africa'. In 2006 he gave the African Studies Annual Lecture at Leeds, entitled 'Supernumeraries of the Human Race: Reflections on the African "Holocaust"'.

== Marriage and children ==
Szeftel was married to the feminist academic and development scholar Carolyn Baylies from 1977 until her death from cancer in 2003. They had two children.

== Publications ==
Together with Baylies, Szeftel authored the book The Dynamics of the One-Party State in Zambia, which was published in 1984 by Manchester University Press. He also co-authored the book Voting for Democracy: Watershed Elections in Anglophone Africa [Ashgate, 1999]. He is author of numerous articles on political corruption in Africa, democratization in Zambia and in Africa generally, elections in Africa, ethnicity and race, and political conflict.
