= Healthcare in San Marino =

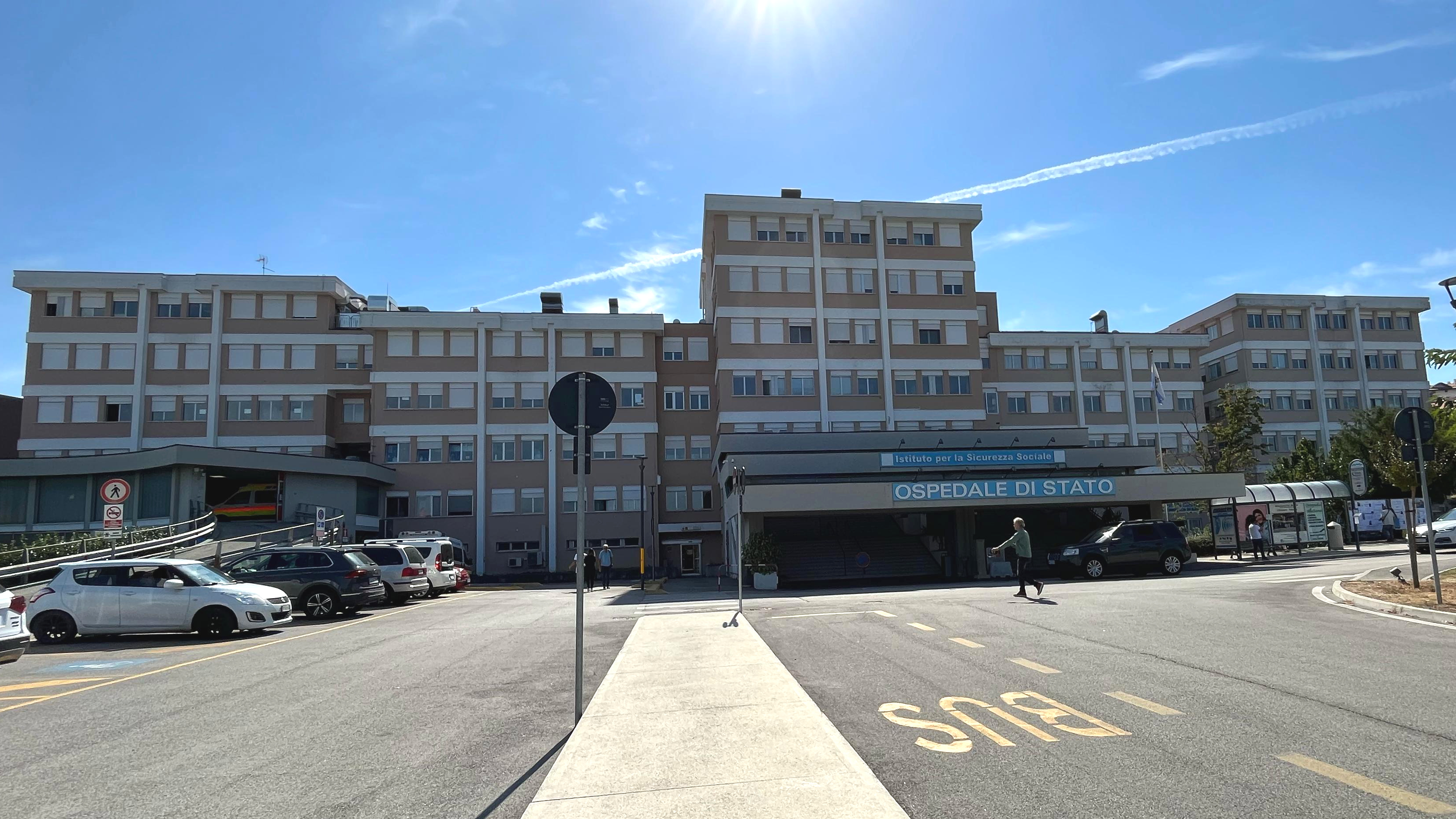
Ospedale di Stato della Repubblica di San Marino, the only hospital in San Marino

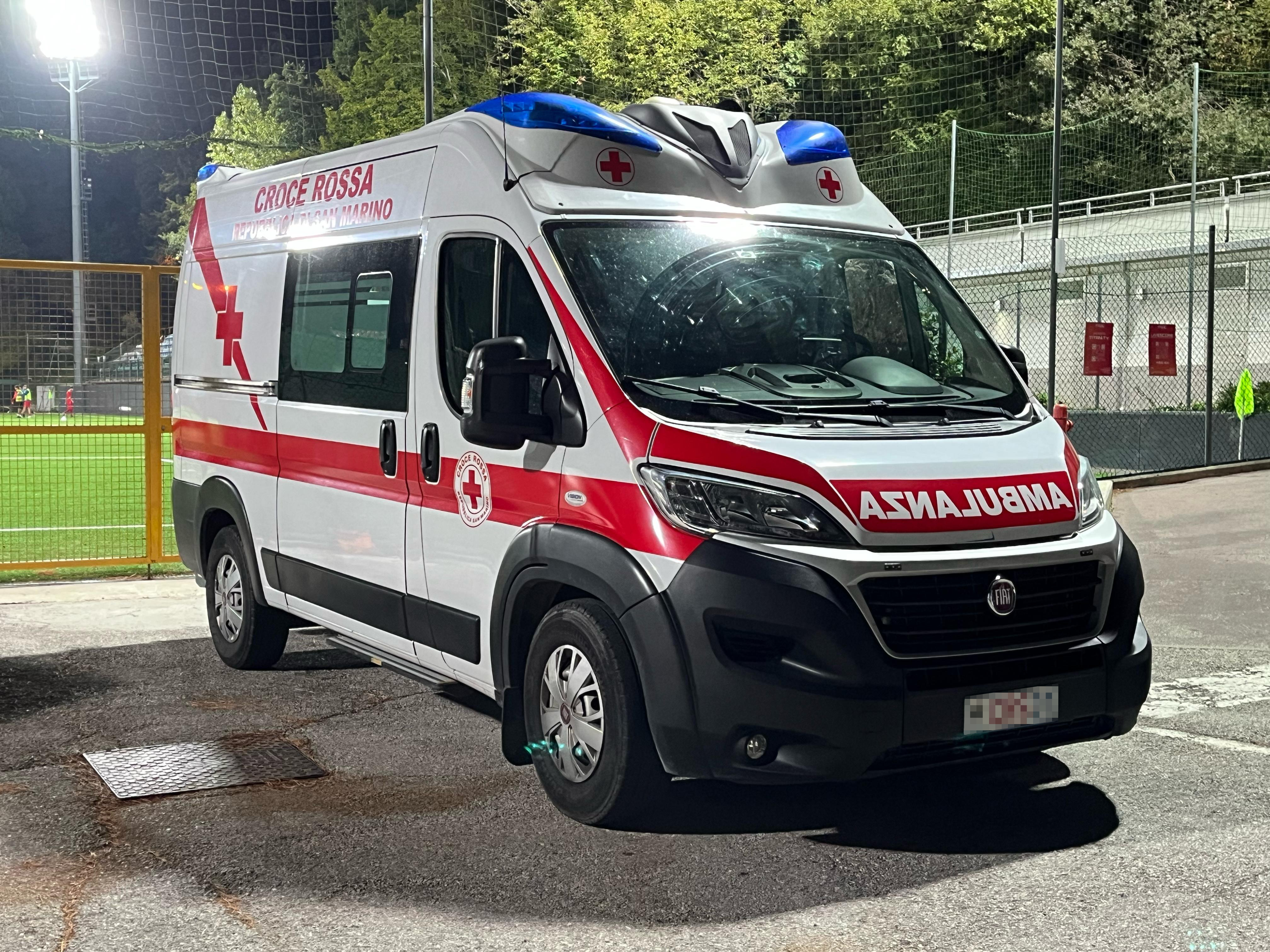
An ambulance from the Croce Rossa Sammarinese

Healthcare in San Marino is provided through a universal health care system, as well as private healthcare to complement it. San Marino's healthcare system is consistently rated as one of the top three in Europe.

== State system ==
State healthcare is provided through the Azienda Sanitaria Locale national health insurance fund. All employees must register with it upon starting a job, and upon registration, are issued with a health card and number, and are automatically registered with a doctor in their neighborhood. Employers pay a contribution for each employee, deducted from their salaries, while the self-employed must pay the full contribution. Employed persons' dependent family members are covered by their insurance. Vulnerable people, such as the unemployed, aged, diabetics, and those on long-term maternity leave, do not need to register with an employer, and are entitled to free treatment without paying contributions.

The state health system covers most basic healthcare, such as hospitalization, specialized care, prescription drugs, pregnancy and childbirth, and rehabilitation services.

== Private insurance ==
Private health insurance is widely used, and there is a series of private clinics in the country. Private insurance grants shorter waiting lists than in the public system, a choice of one's doctor, and more comfortable facilities in hospital, with those who have private coverage entitled to their own single or double room, while those under state coverage must share a room.

== Quality ==
The quality of healthcare in San Marino is high. There is a series of health centers which provide outpatient services, including general practice, maternity and child healthcare, dental care, emergency care, and diagnostic services including laboratory and radiology services. The standards of care in health centers is high.

The country has one hospital, called San Marino Hospital, with an emergency room and other services. There are some medical treatments not available in the country that require patients to go abroad.

San Marino has the highest proportion of doctors for its population in Europe – 4735 per 100,000 in 2015. It has the lowest number of dentists – 27.
