= Colin Murray (anthropologist) =

British anthropologist (1948–2013)

Colin Murray (1948–2013) was a British anthropologist whose research work was for the most part undertaken in southern Africa; in particular in Lesotho. He was for many years a professor of African Sociology at the University of Manchester. His approach has been described as broadly speaking a political-economy one in which the social life of those he studied was examined in terms of the dynamics of land-ownership and livelihood strategies and outcomes intertwined with an examination of their kinship patterns, familial histories and inheritance patterns.

He was for many years an editor of the Journal of Southern African Studies. One major work there was his co-editing with Terence Ranger in 1981 of an issue on “Anthropology and History” . This edition was a compendium of articles drawing on papers presented at a Conference on the Interactions of History and Anthropology in Southern Africa at the University of Manchester in Manchester in September 1980. This was to become a noted and influential edition. (James, 2014, p. 133)

== Selected publications ==
- Murray, C. (1980). Migrant labour and changing family structure in the rural periphery of Southern Africa. Journal of Southern African Studies, 6(2), 139–156.
- Lye, William F., & Murray, C. (1980). Transformations on the highveld: the Tswana & Southern Sotho.
- Murray, C. (1981). Families divided: The impact of migrant labour in Lesotho (Vol. 29). Cambridge University Press.
- Murray, C. (1992). Black Mountain: Land, Class & Power in the Eastern Orange Free State. Edinburgh University Press.
- Murray, C. (2001). Livelihoods research: some conceptual and methodological issues. Chronic Poverty Research Centre Working Paper, (5).
- Murray, C. (2002). Livelihoods research: transcending boundaries of time and space. Journal of Southern African Studies, 28(3), 489–509.
- Murray, C. and Peter Sanders (2005). Medicine Murder in Colonial Lesotho: the anatomy of a moral crisis. Edinburgh University Press.
- Murray, C. (2013). Displaced urbanization: South Africa's rural slums. In Segregation and Apartheid in Twentieth Century South Africa (pp. 231–255). Routledge.
