= Royal Marsden Hospital =

Hospital in London, England

- The Royal Marsden NHS Foundation Trust
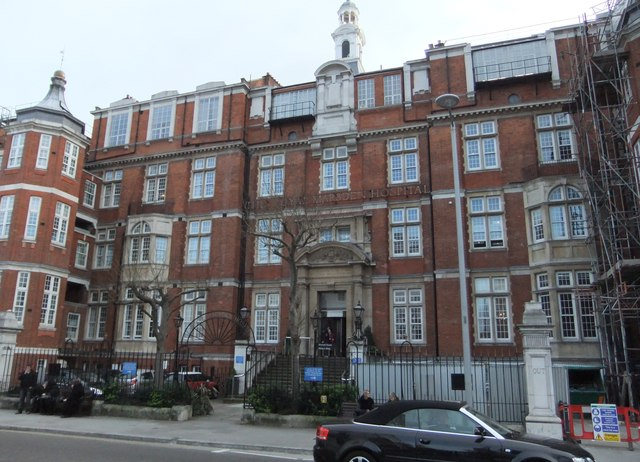
- Royal Marsden Hospital

- Shown in Kensington and Chelsea

Geography
- Location: 203 Fulham Road, Chelsea, London, SW3 6JJ; Downs Road, Belmont, SM2 5PT, United Kingdom
- Coordinates: 51.4908°N 0.1729°W

Organisation
- Care system: NHS England
- Type: Specialist
- Affiliated university: Institute of Cancer Research; Imperial College London
- Patron: The Prince and Princess of Wales

Services
- Emergency department: None
- Beds: 289
- Speciality: Oncology

History
- Founded: 1851; 175 years ago

Links
- Website: http://www.royalmarsden.nhs.uk
- Lists: Hospitals in the United Kingdom

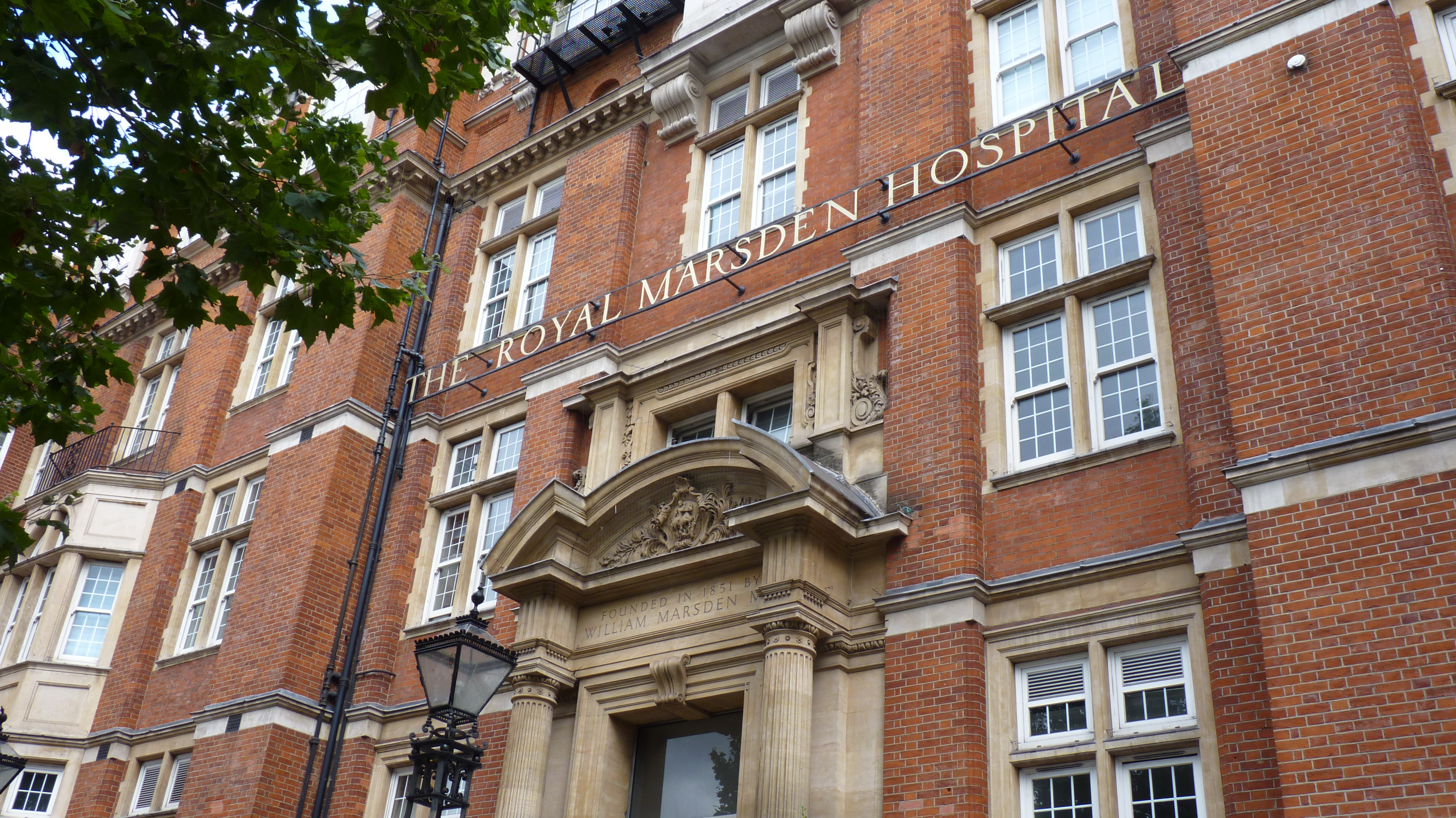

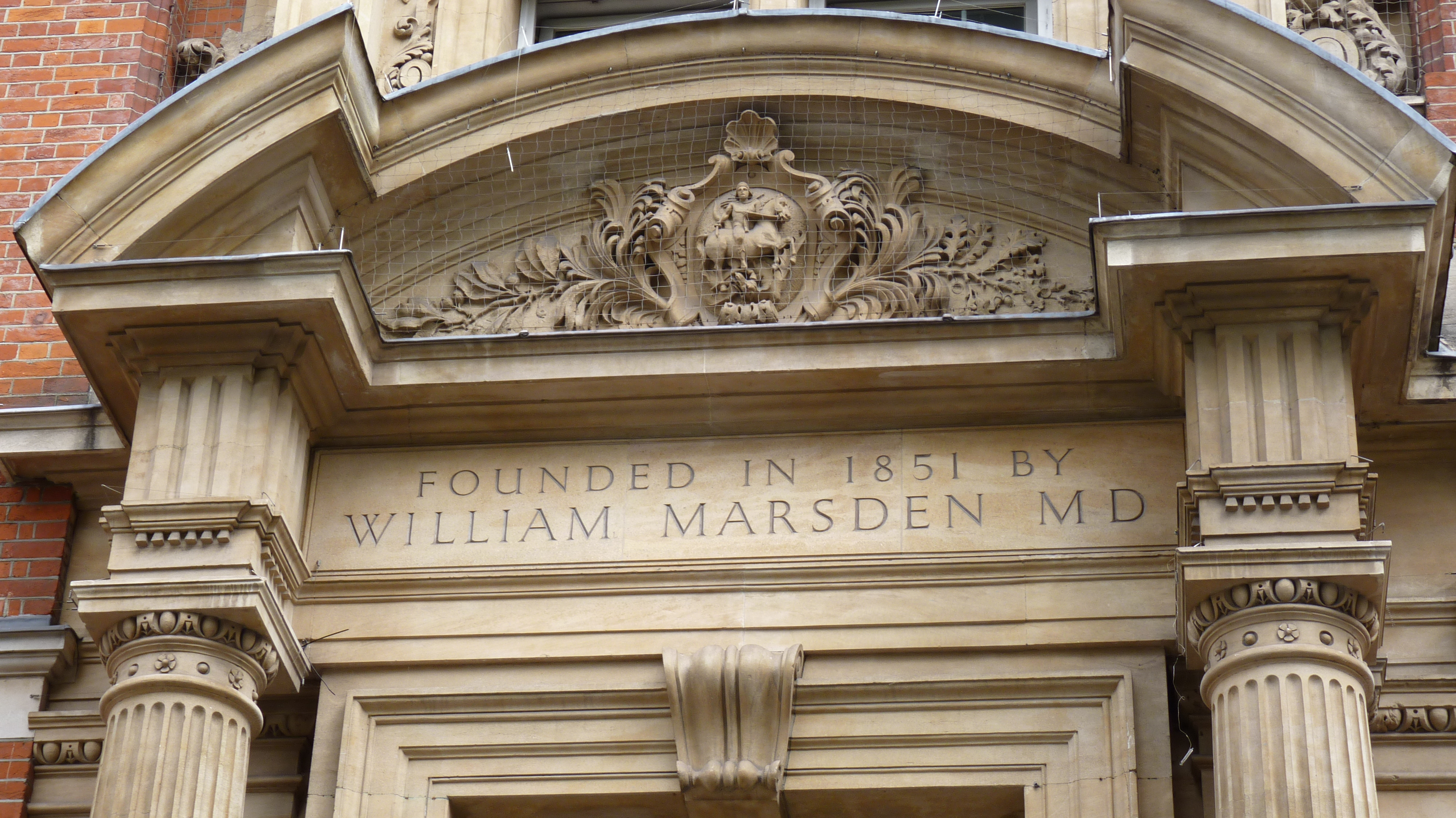

Exterior view of The Royal Marsden Hospital

The Royal Marsden Hospital is a specialist National Health Service oncology hospital in London based at two sites in Brompton, in Kensington and Chelsea, and Belmont in Sutton. It is managed by The Royal Marsden NHS Foundation Trust and supported by The Royal Marsden Cancer Charity.

In addition to providing cancer diagnosis, treatment and care, The Royal Marsden is a major centre for cancer research and teaching. It has a close affiliation with the Institute of Cancer Research, which originated as the hospital's research department and is located alongside the hospital in Brompton and Belmont. Through its subsidiary The Royal Marsden School, it offers undergraduate and postgraduate degrees in cancer care validated by the University of East Anglia.

== Sites ==
The Royal Marsden's Brompton site is adjacent to the Royal Brompton Hospital, in Fulham Road. As of 2020, this site had 112 inpatient beds and 7 operating theatres.

The Belmont site is in the far south of Greater London, adjacent to the former Sutton Hospital, High Down and Downview Prisons, and the Metropolitan Green Belt. This site houses some of the hospital's large diagnostic and radiotherapy equipment, including the UK's only combined MR-Linac.

== Healthcare ==
The Royal Marsden provides diagnostic services, treatment and care for adults and children with cancers, as inpatients and outpatients, or as day care. 50,000 people are treated at the Royal Marsden annually. As of 2020, the Care Quality Commission reported that the Royal Marsden had 219 inpatient beds, 70 day care beds, and 513 outpatient clinics.

== Research ==
The Royal Marsden works in collaboration with The Institute of Cancer Research (ICR), which was founded in 1909 as the hospital's research department. The ICR legally separated from the hospital when the latter became part of the NHS in 1948, but the two retained close ties. The ICR's laboratories are located alongside the Royal Marsden in Brompton and Belmont, and the two organisations produce a joint research strategy. Many of the hospital's consultants also have research roles with the ICR, and some facilities are shared between the organisations, such as the Joint Department of Physics, which operates the linac.

The hospital also participates in wider research collaborations, including a major partnership with Imperial College London in the Imperial College Academic Health Science Centre.

== History ==
=== Foundation: Free Cancer Hospital at Canon Row ===
The Royal Marsden was the first hospital in the world dedicated to the study and treatment of cancer. It was founded as the Free Cancer Hospital in 1851 by William Marsden at 1, Canon Row, Westminster. Marsden, deeply affected by the death of his wife Elizabeth Ann from cancer, resolved to classify tumours, research the causes and find new treatments. The hospital at first consisted solely of a dispensary and the drugs prescribed were palliative and aimed at treating symptoms, but it allowed William Marsden the opportunity to study and research the disease.

The hospital quickly outgrew its original premises as it became apparent that some patients required inpatient care. It moved locations several times during the 1850s until its benefactors decided to find a permanent solution.

=== Move to Brompton ===
Funds were raised to build a dedicated new building on a tract of land in Brompton along the Fulham Road. The design was by Messrs John Young & Son. The hospital was granted its royal charter of incorporation by King George V in 1910 and became known as The Cancer Hospital (Free). This was subsequently changed by King Edward VIII to include the word 'Royal'.

=== NHS era and Sutton site ===
When the National Health Service was formed in 1948, the Royal Marsden became a post-graduate teaching hospital. In 1954, it was renamed the Royal Marsden Hospital in recognition of the vision and commitment of its founder.

In response to the need to expand to treat more patients and train more doctors, a second hospital in Sutton, London, was opened in 1962. The original buildings on the Sutton site were first used as the Banstead Road branch of the South Metropolitan District School, which was a 'district' school for children of workhouse inmates in south London. In the 1890s, girls were kept at the Banstead Road site and boys were kept at a site in Brighton Road, which was built in 1851. The Brighton Road site later became Belmont workhouse and Belmont Psychiatric hospital, before being demolished in the 1980s. The Banstead Road site later became a sanatorium, before the southern half of the site was acquired by Royal Marsden in 1962.

=== 2008 Brompton fire ===
On 2 January 2008, just before 1:30 pm, a fire broke out in a plant room on the top floor of the hospital. When the fire was at its peak, 125 firefighters and 16 ambulances were in attendance. Over the period of the fire, 111 fire appliances attended with 56 officers including the assistant commissioner. The smoke was visible for miles around.

All 200 staff, outpatients, and 79 inpatients were evacuated to a local church and the neighbouring Royal Brompton Hospital, some carried on mattresses by emergency responders and doctors. Five operating theatres and at least two wards were put out of action. Two patients were undergoing surgery in the operating theatres in the basement and had to be evacuated. Two firefighters and one member of staff suffered slight smoke inhalation but there were no other casualties or injuries. They were taken to another hospital for treatment.

The entire roof of the Chelsea Wing of the hospital was burned through, and the top floor was also affected, but a hospital official said that damage was less than thought and no research documentation had been lost.

== NHS Foundation Trust ==
The Royal Marsden NHS Foundation Trust
- Type: Specialist
- Established: April 2004
- Budget: £578 million (2022-23)
- Hospitals: The Royal Marsden Hospital
- Chair: Douglas Flint
- Chief executive: Cally Palmer
- Staff: 3,978
- Website: www.nhs.uk/Services/hospitals/Overview/DefaultView.aspx?id=1416

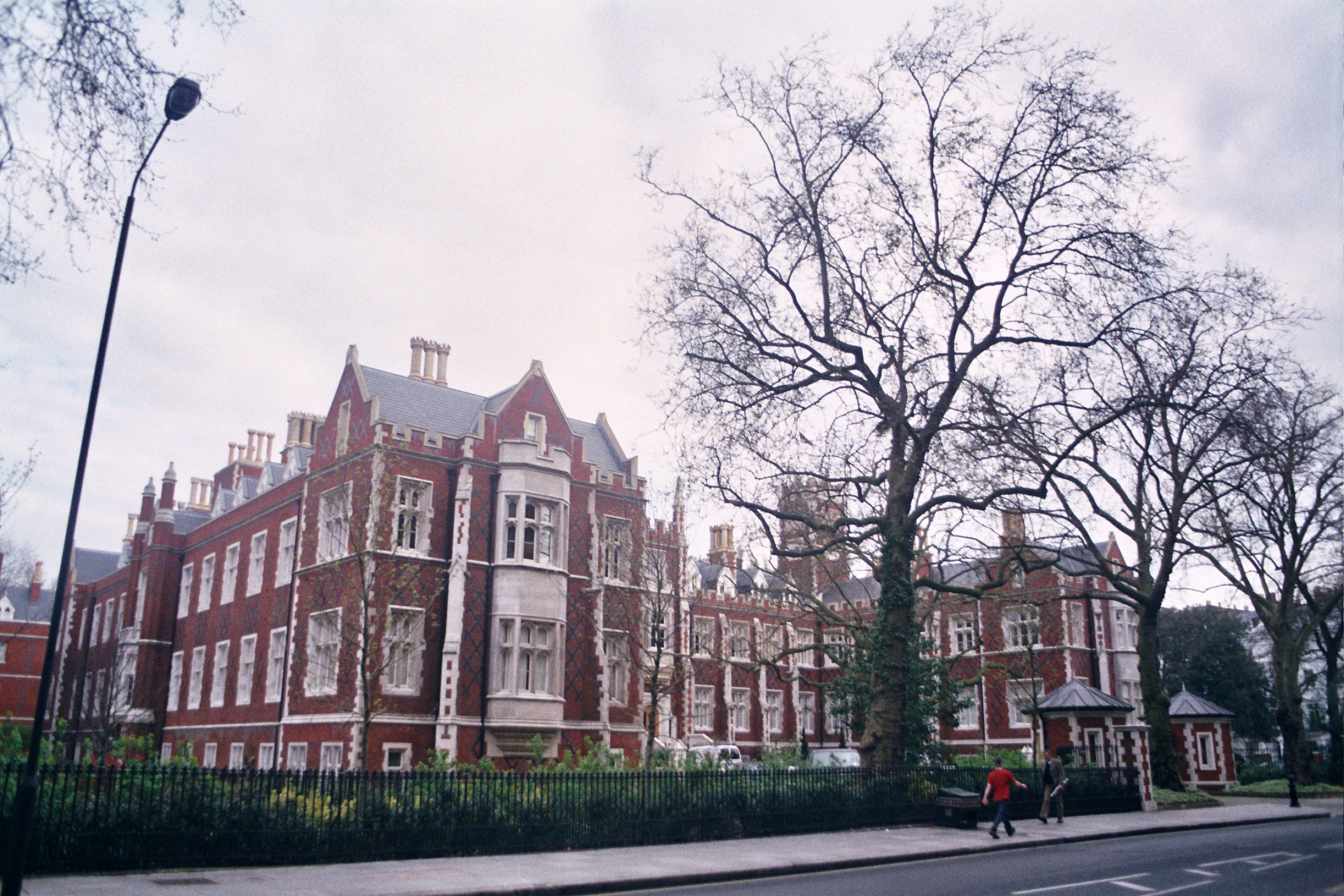
The former Brompton Hospital building, Fulham Road, London

The Royal Marsden Hospital is operated by an NHS Foundation Trust. Formed in April 2004, it was one of the first NHS Foundation Trusts.

=== Performance ===
It was named by the Health Service Journal as one of the top hundred NHS trusts to work for in 2015. At that time it had 3528 full-time equivalent staff and a sickness absence rate of 2.85%. 89% of staff recommend it as a place for treatment and 71% recommended it as a place to work.

In March 2016 the trust was ranked third in the Learning from Mistakes League.

=== Private patients ===
The trust hopes to raise 45% of its income from private patients and other non-NHS sources in 2016/17 and is trying to raise its income from paying patients from £90 million to £100 million. According to LaingBuisson it is the most commercially orientated NHS hospital. It increased private patient income by 13% from 2014 to 2016 to £77 million. In 2018-19 it made £121 million through its private patient units, more than a quarter of its total income, and about 18% of all the private healthcare carried out in England by the NHS. This growth was led by imaging and robotic surgery. In 2019-20 50% of the trust's total revenue, £463 million, came from NHS work. 9% came from Kuwait. Payments from health insurance firms accounted for 16%, and self-pay patients for 2%. The main commercial rival is Leaders in Oncology Care which in 2018 had income of £95 million across its four sites.

== Notable staff ==
The surgeon William Ernest Miles was appointed to the hospital in 1899 and at the age of 60 was forced to retire, much against his will. In 1908, Thomas Horder, later raised to the peerage, was appointed as the hospital's first physician.

David Waldron Smithers, professor of radiotherapy at the University of London, chaired the committee that constructed and established the Surrey branch of the Marsden, which was opened in 1963. He led radiation oncology at the hospital. The Royal Marsden's main lecture theatre is named in honour of consultant radiotherapist Julian Bloom.

Sarah Mullally worked at the Royal Marsden as a nurse before she became the youngest Chief Nursing Officer, and later the first female Archbishop of Canterbury.

== Arms ==
Coat of arms of Royal Marsden Hospital

Notes
Granted 14 February 1963.
Crest
On a wreath of the colours between two rays of lightning Or a stag's head erased Gules thereon a bee volant Gold.
Escutcheon
Per pale Gules and Azure a dance argent sur mounted by a rod of Aesculapius ensigned by an ancient crown between in base two coots Or.
Supporters
On the dexter side an owl and on the sinister side an unicorn each resting the interior leg upon a crab Or.
Motto
Labor Omnia Vincit

== See also ==
- List of NHS trusts
- Cancer in the United Kingdom
