= Lionel Cliffe =

English political economist (1936–2013)

- Born: Lionel R. Cliffe; 1936
- Died: 24 October 2013 (aged 77)
- Education: King Edward VII Grammar School; University of Nottingham
- Occupations: Political economist and activist
- Awards: ASAUK Distinguished Africanist Award, 2002

Lionel R. Cliffe (1936 – 24 October 2013) was an English political economist and activist whose work focused on the struggle for land rights and freedom in Africa from the 1960s. He was Professor of Politics at the University of Leeds.

== Early life and education ==
Cliffe was educated at King Edward VII Grammar School in Sheffield and at the University of Nottingham, where he read Economics with Mathematics and Statistics. A conscientious objector, he was excused national service and instead worked for four years in the late 1950s as an Information and Research Assistant for Oxfam in Oxford.

== Academic career ==
In 1961, Cliffe went to Dar es Salaam in Tanzania to teach at Kivukoni adult education college and later at the University of Dar es Salaam, where he was Director of Development Studies. He undertook fieldwork in Uganda, Tanzania and Zambia.

Cliffe returned to the UK in 1976 and taught briefly at the universities of Sheffield and Durham, before being appointed Lecturer in Politics at the University of Leeds in 1978. He was promoted to Senior Lecturer in 1982, Reader in 1988 and Professor in 1990. There, he helped develop what is now Leeds University Centre for African Studies (LUCAS) and also the journal Review of African Political Economy. Cliffe retired as Emeritus Professor in 2001.

In 2002, the African Studies Association of the United Kingdom (ASAUK) marked his career with the Distinguished Africanist award.

== Death ==
Cliffe died on 24 October 2013 at the age of 77, after being diagnosed with myeloma.

== Selected publications ==
- Socialism in Tanzania: Politics and Policies, co-edited with John S. Saul, 2 vols. (1972–3)
- Rural Cooperation in Tanzania, co-edited with John S. Saul and others (1975)
- Southern Africa after the drought: a crisis of social reproduction (1978)
- Behind the war in Eritrea (co-edited with Basil Davidson and Bereket Habte Selassie (1980).
- Prospects for agrarian transformation in Zimbabwe (1988)
- The Long struggle of Eritrea for independence and constructive peace (co-edited with Basil Davidson (1988)
- Zimbabwe: politics, economics and society (with Colin Stoneman) (1989)
- The Transition to Independence in Namibia, with Ray Bush and Jenny Lindsay (1994)
- The Politics of Lying, with Maureen Ramsay and David Bartlett (2000)
- The Struggle for Land in Africa, Leeds African Studies Bulletin, 64 (2001), pp. 9–44.
- Conflict and peace in the Horn of Africa (co-edited with Roy Love and Kjetil, Tronvoll) (2009)
- Outcomes of post-2000 fast track land reform in Zimbabwe (co-edited with Jocelyn Alexander, Ben Cousins and Rudo Gaidzanwa) (2013)
- "Cricket, racism and the Yorkshire Leagues: Prospects for a more inclusive cricket in Yorkshire", in Michael Lavalette (ed.), Capitalism and Sport: Politics, Protest, People and Play (2013)
