= Best Start =

British initiative on social services

Best Start, formerly known as Sure Start (named Flying Start in Wales) is a UK Government area-based initiative, announced in 1998 by the then Chancellor of the Exchequer, Gordon Brown, applying primarily in England with slightly different versions in Wales, Scotland and Northern Ireland. It introduced a network of children's centres and other services to support local families with children under 5, including "health services, parenting support, early learning and childcare, and parental employment support". The initiative originated from HM Treasury, with the aim of "giving children the best possible start in life" through improvement of childcare, early education, health and family support, with an emphasis on outreach and community development.

Launched in 1998 by Tessa Jowell, Sure Start had similarities to the much older, and similarly named, Head Start programme in the United States and is also comparable to Australia Head Start and Ontario's Early Years Plan. The initiatives were subsequently bound together to form Sure Start Children's Centres, and responsibility for them was transferred to local government. Jowell subsequently commented in 2015, "I am very proud of setting up Sure Start, because the first three years of a child's life are absolutely critical in determining the chances they have subsequently."

The National Evaluation of Sure Start (NESS) project ran from 2001 until 2012. Initial research findings from NESS, published in 2005, suggested the impact of (the then termed) Sure Start Local Programmes (SSLPs) was not as great as had been hoped. However, by 2010, NESS could identify a significant impact on some of the outcomes set for Sure Start.

The Evaluation of Children's Centres in England (ECCE) project ran from 2009 until 2015. Results concerning the impact of (the subsequently termed) Sure Start Children's Centres (SSCCs) concluded that, "Children's Centres set up to support parents of young children can improve the mental health of mothers and functioning of families but that these benefits are being eroded by cuts."

In 2019, a study conducted by the Institute for Fiscal Studies concluded that Sure Start reduced the numbers of people taken to hospital, and saved millions of pounds for the National Health Service. Gordon Brown and other senior New Labour figures called for a "new Sure Start" in 2024 after a further IFS study on the programme's educational impacts found that "children who lived within a short distance (2.5 kilometres) of a Sure Start centre for their first five years performed 0.8 grades better in their GCSEs". Then-Shadow Chancellor Rachel Reeves refused to commit to expanding Sure Start in response to the report.

In 2024, the Conservative Government opened 400 new family hubs across 75 local authorities, which offer a wider range of services than previous Sure Start centres. In 2025, Sure Start was rebranded as Best Start and relaunched by the Labour Government of Keir Starmer, which announced an expansion of Best Start family hubs to cover every local authority in England, with £500 million allocated to create Best Start Services including Best Start Hubs. The plans aim for a total of 1,000 hubs to be open by 2028.

== History ==
=== Initial arrangement ===
Initial funding was substantial, with £540M allocated for expenditure between 1999 and 2002, £452M of it within England, to set up 250 Sure Start Local Programmes (SSLPs) reaching up to 150,000 children in areas of deprivation.

The UK Government initially pledged to fund Sure Start for 10 years, but in 2003, Chancellor Gordon Brown announced the Government's long-term plan to transfer Sure Start into the control of local government by 2005, and create a Sure Start Children's Centre in every community.

Related to the Government's goal of reducing child poverty, the initial districts for Sure Start development were selected "according to the levels of deprivation within their areas" the focus being particularly on disadvantaged areas but open to all families living in the catchment area. Such catchment areas were selected locally by the projects.

Sure Start was overseen by the Department for Children, Schools and Families and the Department for Work and Pensions. The programme has been described by Tony Blair as "one of New Labour's greatest achievements".

Each project was allowed to develop in its own way depending on the expressed wishes of parents and the guidance of the various organisations heading up each one. Policy on such matters as choosing volunteers and even the services offered were a local level decision.

Sure Start local programmes were opened in waves, Round 1 indicates the first wave of programmes starting 1999. Round 6 represents the final wave of Sure Start local programmes mostly starting in 2003.

=== Move from programmes to centres ===
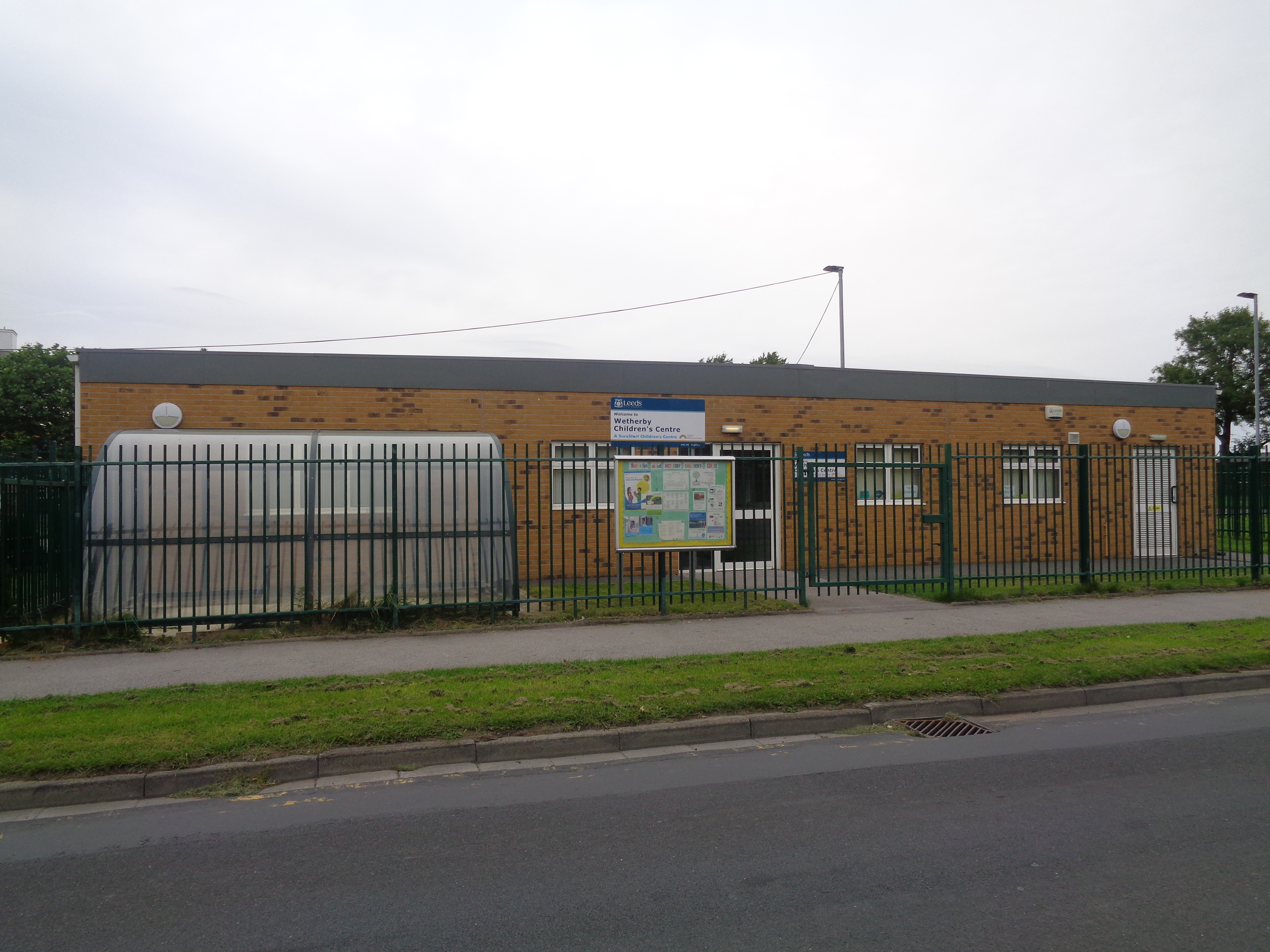
A Sure Start centre on the Hallfield Estate in Wetherby, West Yorkshire.

Every Child Matters proposed a switch from Sure Start Local Programmes (SSLPs) to Sure Start Children's Centres (SSCCs), which would be controlled by local authorities, and would be provided not just in the most disadvantaged areas. In the 2004 Comprehensive Spending Review, Chancellor Gordon Brown announced that the Government would provide funding for 2,500 Children's Centres by 2008. This target was later increased to 3,500 children's centres by 2010. Of the 524 original Sure Start local programmes, most are now Sure Start Children's Centres.

Some Sure Start Local Programmes have become registered Charities and Companies Limited by guarantee. Sure Start Hounslow, a programme in West London, became a company limited by guarantee in 2004 and now delivers a range of services, many through Service Level Agreement with the local authority, not all of which focus entirely on children under five. This development has been one of many routes that Sure Start Local Programmes have taken to ensure sustainability during the "tapering" of the original Sure Start Grant.

In 2005, Norman Glass, one of the original architects of Sure Start wrote an article praising the increased government focus on the early years, but criticising cuts in funding per head; the change from child development to childcare and getting mothers into work; and the shift back to local authority control, rather than being run by boards including parents.

Children's Centres are expected to provide:

- In centres in the 30% most disadvantaged areas: integrated early learning and childcare (early years provision) for a minimum of 10 hours a day, five days a week, 48 weeks a year; and support for a childminder network
- In centres in the 70% least disadvantaged areas, which do not elect to offer early years provision: drop-in activity sessions for children, such as stay and play sessions
- Family Support, including support and advice on parenting, information about services available in the area and access to specialist, targeted services; and Parental Outreach
- Child and Family Health Services, such as antenatal and postnatal support, information and guidance on breastfeeding, health and nutrition, smoking cessation support, and speech and language therapy and other specialist support
- Links with Jobcentre Plus to encourage and support parents and carers who wish to consider training and employment
- Quick and easy access to wider services

=== Cut backs under the austerity programme ===
Cuts in general funding from central government to local authorities in England led to fears, in 2011, that up to 250 Sure Start centres would close. The former Secretary of State for Education, Michael Gove, admitted that funding for Sure Start had not been protected, as most central funding of local authorities would no longer be ring-fenced. The decision would be left to local councils, though Children's Minister Sarah Teather said there was enough money available to maintain existing children's centres, should they wish.

A number of local councils announced cuts to their Sure Start budgets, and parents and mothers' groups protested against these cuts, taking their campaign directly to Downing Street. Many councils retreated. In February 2017, all 44 Sure Start children's centres in Oxfordshire were closed after High Court appeals against the measure failed.

Ministers said they wanted to refocus the scheme to help the most disadvantaged families. The government is now allowing parents to choose their own childcare provider, and to get part-funding provided via tax credits, rather than a centrally run service.

In 2017, a Briefing Paper for Parliament summarized the changes to Sure Start that had occurred under the 2015–2017 Conservative Government. Although "The Conservative Government did not make any significant operational or legislative changes to Sure Start during the 2015–2017 Parliament", "Arguably the most significant changes related to funding". The Briefing Paper notes that in real terms, spending in 2015–2016 was 47% less than in 2010–2011 with budgets for 2016–2017 showing a further planned reduction in spending. This Briefing Paper for MPs also reported a reduction of 208 Sure Start Children's Centre sites between 2015 and 2017.

A report in The Guardian stated that as many 1000 centres were closed between 2010 and 2018, and a study warned that "The study warns that Sure Start centres are at a "tipping point", with further drastic reductions on the way as local authority budgets continue to shrink. It says centres are struggling to "survive in an environment of declining resources and loss of strategic direction".

In 2018 an article in the Independent asserted a relation between the extensive closures and children starting schools with no skills.

By February 2020, 1,292 family centres had been shut since 2010. At their peak in 2009/10, there were 3,600 centres. The austerity reduced numbers by up to 85 per cent in some areas. In Staffordshire, 46 of 54 centres shut, while Oxfordshire lost 37 of its 45 centres.

By the end of March 2023, 1,168 (38%) children's centres had closed in England since government had first implemented austerity measures in 2010.

=== Move from children's centres to family hubs ===
In the 2021 Autumn budget, the Conservative Government announced the creation of family hubs, which superseded the Sure Start children's centres. Unlike previous Sure Start centres, the new family hubs offer a wider range of services, supporting children from their conception through to early adulthood. The first 400 hubs opened across 75 pre-selected local authorities in England in 2024. In 2024, the Conservative Government also announced £12 million of funding to transition the remaining children's centres into family hubs across 12 local authorities.

During the 2024 general election campaign, the Labour Party said it would look into relaunching Sure Start once the public finances allowed for it, though with some reform. However, it fell short of making this a manifesto commitment. After Labour's landslide victory, the party commissioned the creation of a child poverty taskforce, which reportedly looked into recommending a relaunch of Sure Start in May 2025.

In July 2025, the Labour Government relaunched Sure Start and rebranded it as Best Start (which was already the name of Sure Start in Scotland), with plans to expand the Best Start family hubs to other parts of the country. The Government announced £500 million of funding to establish a new Best Start family hub in deprived areas of each local authority by April 2026, with up to 1,000 Best Start hubs planned by the end of 2028. The relaunch and expansion of the programme is part of the Labour Government's push to replace the more than 1,400 children's centres closed since 2010 under the previous Coalition and Conservative governments.

== Effectiveness evidence ==
A 2007 study by researchers from the Universities of Oxford and Wales published in the British Medical Journal looking at parenting interventions within the Sure Start system in Wales examined 153 parents from socially deprived areas and showed that a course teaching improved parenting skills had great benefits in reducing problem behaviour in young children. Parents were taught to:

- Increase positive child behaviour through praise and incentives
- Improve parent-child interaction: relationship building
- Set clear expectations: limit-setting and non-aversive management strategies for non-compliance
- Apply consistent gentle consequences for problem behaviour

The study recommended that this evidence-based class be expanded from Wales to the rest of the UK, making it available for all parents who need it, stating that the Sure Start programme has not yet produced results as good as these in England.

A lack of effectiveness in England has been suggested by a University of Durham study which suggested that Sure Start was ineffective at improving results in early schooling.

A national longitudinal evaluation of Sure Start, known as NESS, was set up in 2001. Although early evaluations did not find Sure Start Local Programmes (SSLPs) to have been particularly effective, by 2008 NESS was able to conclude "For the time being, it remains plausible, even if by no means certain, that the differences in findings across the first and second phases of the NESS Impact Study reflect actual changes in the impact of SSLPs resulting from the increasing quality of service provision, greater attention to the hard-to-reach and the move to Children's Centres, as well as the greater exposure to the programme of children and families in the latest phase of the impact evaluation."

In 2010, robust research conducted by NESS demonstrated significant effects of SSLPs on eight of 21 outcomes: two positive outcomes for children (lower BMIs and better physical health), four positive outcomes for mothers and families (more stimulating and less chaotic home environments, less harsh discipline, and greater life-satisfaction)

A further publicly funded national longitudinal evaluation of Sure Start, known as ECCE, was set up in 2009. This study, different in design to NESS, ran for 6 years and by 2015 had, "identified a number of significant but relatively small positive effects in promoting better outcomes for each user group considered (child, mother, and families)" although no impact was found on household employment status (whether or not one or adults in a household works) or on children's health. However, in 2016 the British Medical Journal noted that the benefits of Sure Start to children and families were being eroded by austerity cuts and that, "disadvantaged families are at greatest risk from [these] austerity cuts".

In 2017 the evidence concerning the effectiveness of Sure Start from both the NESS and the ECCE studies was summarised by a briefing paper that was written for members of Parliament. The value-for-money analysis concluded that most services provided a net financial loss to Government, but that the overall benefits (to both individuals and the Government) were seen to provide overall value for money: "This report has shown that policies which have impacts within reasonable bounds of magnitudes on early child and family outcomes can potentially generate substantial monetary returns over and above the costs of delivering the services."

In June 2019, a study conducted by the Institute for Fiscal Studies concluded that Sure Start reduced the numbers of people taken to hospital and saved millions of pounds for the National Health Service. The study found that where Sure Start offered high levels of service in poor neighbourhoods in England, visits to hospital to treat injuries fell among all children of primary school age, and by a third of all 11-year-olds. Access to the programme cut the probability of admission to hospital in the poorest 30% of areas by 19% at the age of 11, while in the richest 30% of areas there was almost no impact. Across all areas, the programme's effect was equivalent to annually averting 5,500 hospitalisations of 11-year-olds.

Two years later, in June 2021, the cuts in early years support were also linked to children obesity, "the cuts correspond to 4575 more children with obesity or 9174 more overweight/obese children between 2010/11 and 2017/18 than would have been expected had funding levels for the centres remained the same, estimate the researchers. With deprived areas hardest hit by these cuts, the effect is likely to have widened the 'obesity gap' between the richest and the poorest children, they say."

In April 2024, an Institute for Fiscal Studies report on the educational impacts of the Sure Start programme found that "children who lived within a short distance (2.5 kilometres) of a Sure Start centre for their first five years performed 0.8 grades better in their GCSEs", with "larger impacts for those from the poorest backgrounds and those from non-white backgrounds". It further found "that for every £1 the government spent on Sure Start, there were benefits to attending children worth £1.09" in higher lifetime earnings as a result of these educational outcomes. The replacement Family Hub programme introduced in 2021 has received less funding compared to Sure Start the report found, receiving "just over £100 million per year, compared with £300 million per year in the first year of Sure Start (and £2.5 billion per year at its peak)."

A 2025 BMJ systematic review, published by Dr Jatinder Hayre and colleagues, examined the impact of the Sure Start programme on child health. Their synthesis identified significant falls in hospital admissions, unintentional injuries and obesity amongst children; concomitantly, it recorded higher breastfeeding rates, superior dental hygiene, and clinically meaningful reductions in attention-deficit hyperactivity disorder and conduct-disorder symptoms. Conversely, the evidence for broader social-function metrics proved inconclusive, a finding the authors attributed chiefly to methodological heterogeneity across the underlying studies.
