= John S. Saul =

Canadian academic and activist (1938–2023)

John Shannon Saul FRSC (May 4, 1938 – September 23, 2023) was a Canadian political economist and activist. His work focused on the liberation struggles of southern Africa from the 1960s to the 2020s.

== Professional activities ==
Saul was professor emeritus of politics at York University in Toronto. He also taught at the University of Dar es Salaam in Tanzania, alongside activist-academics such as Giovanni Arrighi (with whom he wrote Essays on the Political Economy of Africa) and Walter Rodney; at the University of Eduardo Mondlane in Maputo, Mozambique, alongside activist-academics such as Ruth First; and at the University of the Witwatersrand, Johannesburg in South Africa.

From the 1970s to the 1990s, Saul was involved with the Toronto Committee for the Liberation of Portugal's African Colonies (TCLPAC), later the Toronto Committee for the Liberation of Southern Africa (TCLSAC), which coordinated the liberation support/anti-apartheid movement in Toronto. He was also an editor of both the Canadian progressive magazine This Magazine (1973–1985) and Southern Africa Report (1985–2000).

== Commentary ==
Saul was a socialist, and was considered to be an activist-academic in the broader Marxist tradition. As Leo Panitch, long-time editor of the prestigious Socialist Register, wrote:

Based on his almost half-century of immense political and intellectual contributions to African liberation struggles, John Saul shows [in his recent writings] that he is one of the few today who has the courage as well as the credentials to pose the sober question of "what did 'liberation' mean anyway"? What is more Saul also shows that he is one of the few with the confidence as well as the capacity to answer the question by drawing inspirational and strategic socialist and revolutionary conclusions.

The well-known author (and for many years co-editor with Panitch of Socialist Register) Colin Leys adds: "John Saul's reflections on the struggles for liberation to which he had devoted a lifetime of scholarship and activism...the wise lessons he draws, and his resolute refusal to be pessimistic in spite of all setbacks...should be not just read but taken to heart by everyone who cares about the future of Africa and the world."

As highly regarded Canadian journalist Rick Salutin further noted, in a column written on the occasion of Saul's retirement from York University in Toronto in 2004, "Saul's writings are all about instilling hope and learning from failure...He is a sort of underground alternate Canadian tradition to the internationalism of Lester Pearson, more like the tradition of Norman Bethune and Chris Giannou."

Similarly, Jorge Rebelo, poet, long-time Frelimo (Mozambique) militant, and cabinet minister in the first government of a liberated Mozambique, writes that "Saul's greatest contribution has been sharing ideas, criticizing and giving advice - reminding us that we should base our ideology on the concrete realities of our country and people, not on ready-made manuals...that we should always ensure the participation of the people in decision-making, and make socialism not just a slogan but a real objective."

Noted Indian Marxist scholar and activist, Aijaz Ahmad, concluded that "Saul combines in his person much of what is best about the international political culture of the left."

== Honours ==
In 2004, Saul was elected fellow of the Royal Society of Canada. In 2010, he was granted an honorary doctorate by Victoria University within the University of Toronto. In 2011, he received a Lifetime Achievement Award by the Canadian Association of African Studies in 2011.

== Death ==
Saul died from cancer on September 23, 2023, at the age of 85.

== Works ==
- Socialism in Tanzania: Politics and Policies, co-edited with Lionel Cliffe, 2 vols. (1972-3)
- Essays on the Political Economy of Africa, with Giovanni Arrighi (1973)
- Socialism and Participation: Tanzania's 1970 National Election, co-edited with the Electoral Studies Committee, University of Dar es Salaam (1974)
- Canada and Mozambique (1974)
- Rural Cooperation in Tanzania, co-edited with Lionel Cliffe and others (1975)
- Words and Deeds: Canada, Portugal and Africa, with the Toronto Committee for the Liberation of Southern Africa (1976)
- The State and Revolution in Eastern Africa (1979)
- The Crisis in South Africa, co-authored with Stephen Gelb (1981, rev. ed. 1986)
- O Marxismo-Leninismo no Contexto Moçambicano (1983)
- A Difficult Road: The Transition to Socialism in Mozambique (1985)
- Socialist Ideology and the Struggle for Southern Africa (1990)
- Recolonization and Resistance: Southern Africa in the 1990s (1994)
- Namibia's Liberation Struggle: The Two-Edged Sword, with Colin Leys, & others (1995)
- Millennial Africa: Capitalism, Socialism, Democracy (2001)
- The Next Liberation Struggle: Capitalism, Socialism and Democracy in Southern Africa (2005)
- Development after Globalization: Theory and Practice for the Embattled South in a New Imperial Age (2006)
- Decolonization and Empire: Contesting the Rhetoric and Reality of Resubordination in Southern Africa and Beyond (2007)
- Revolutionary Traveller: Freeze-Frames from a Life (2009)
- Liberation Lite: The Roots of Recolonization in Southern Africa (2011)
- South Africa – The Present as History: From Mrs. Ples to Mandela AND Marikana (2014)
- A Flawed Freedom: Rethinking Southern African Liberation (2014)
- On Building a Social Movement: The North American Campaign for Southern African Liberation Revisited (2017)
- Revolutionary Hope vs Free-Market Fantasies: Keeping the Southern Africa Liberation Struggle Alive – Theory, Practice, Context (2021)
