= John Lister (academic) =

John Lister is a Senior Lecturer (associate professor) in Journalism, and Health Journalism at the Coventry University Department of Media and Communication.

Lister is the author of two books on international health reform: Health Policy Reform: Driving the Wrong Way? and Global Health vs. Private Profit. He writes about Private Finance Initiative in the NHS. Dr. Lister has worked in print journalism since 1974, and has also been involved in public relations and investigative research on health policy in the UK and worldwide.

He is the executive director and founder of London Health Emergency, a pro-NHS public interest group, and has focused on investigative health journalism since 1984 conducting research and consulting for local authorities and campaign groups across England and internationally and for trade unions at the local and regional level. He edited the 1988 book Cutting the Lifeline: The Fight For the NHS, and is one of the founders of the national campaign "Save Our NHS".

== Health journalism ==
In addition to producing branch and regional tabloid newspapers for affiliated union bodies, Lister's research through London Health Emergency has covered a range of subjects, from planned local hospital cutbacks and closures and the financial standing of health care providers in England and Wales, through studies on hospital cleaning, privatization of services, the controversial Private Finance Initiative, care of older people, mental health – and various government proposals for market-style reforms, from Margaret Thatcher’s 1989 "review" and subsequent White Paper, through Tony Blair’s government, and now the current far-reaching plans of the Conservative-led coalition.

He has conducted national-level and regional commissioned projects with the largest health union UNISON, and for the BMA.

Lister, who lives in Oxford, is also a founder member of Keep Our NHS Public, and a board member since 2005. He is a regular public speaker at meetings on NHS issues throughout England, as well as international conferences and events, and writes a monthly column on health issues for the Morning Star newspaper, and occasionally for other publications including Private Eye.

== Lecturing ==
In his academic capacity, since 2004, Lister has also been a part-time senior lecturer at Coventry University, teaching Journalism, and Masters level Journalism and Health Journalism.

He has led a health policy, Contemporary Issues in Health, module for MSC health students at Coventry University's Faculty of Health and Life Sciences since 1999. In 2006–7, Lister worked with colleagues at the University of Ottawa and in other countries as part of the Globalisation and Health Knowledge Network of the World Health Organization’s Commission on the Social Determinants of Health, and since 2004 he has spoken at a number of international conferences on Globalisation and health policy issues. In 2013, Lister was invited by EvidenceNetwork.ca in Canada to present a series of lectures on what Canada can learn from Britain's National Health Service. He also addressed the quality of health journalism in Europe and North America, and outlined how health policy journalism can, and needs to be, improved.

== HeaRT Project ==
Since the end of 2010, Lister has been involved through Coventry University as the UK partner in the EU-funded HeaRT (Health Reporter Training) project, involving seven partner countries, and which sets out to identify training needs and existing resources for the training of health journalists, and the develop and evaluate a training package that will enhance the skills of those working as health journalists and improve the quality of information provided by the news media.
