= Interhealth Canada =

International provider of healthcare services

Interhealth Canada is an international provider of healthcare services specialising in orthopaedics and trauma. Its Head Office is located in Toronto with regional offices in Dubai, Kuwait and the United Kingdom. Wilson Parasiuk was a director from 1994 to 2002.

== Kuwait ==
The company designed, built, commissioned and initially operated the Royale Hayat Hospital which opened in November 2006.

== Turks and Caicos Islands ==
FirstCaribbean International Bank arranged US$124 million financing for the Turks and Caicos Islands Hospitals Public Private Partnership Project. Dr. Denise Braithwaite-Tennant was appointed chief executive officer of the hospital in December 2020.

The company has a 25-year contract to run a hospital from April 2010 as part of the National Health System on the Turks and Caicos Islands. It built two surgical centres — one in Provo with 20 beds and the other in Grand Turk with 10 beds — under a public-private partnership for which they are paid $80 million annually. In January 2014, it was reported that a supplementary allocation of $6.2 million was required by the Ministry of Health to meet further cost of services delivery by the company. This is a level two hospital so there is an arrangement for nurses to spend six months in the hospital at the University of the West Indies to complete their training.

Their operation, which enables Canadians to travel to the Islands for treatment, has been criticised in Canada by Sandra Azocar, executive director of Friends of Medicare, who says: "Private clinics, whether in Canada or Turks and Caicos Island, distort the public system. They don’t save money; they fix no problem that the public system itself can’t fix; and they introduce a whole world of new problems."

Edwin Astwood complained about the company's inefficiency, exorbitant prices and malfunctioning machines in 2019 saying that "people who we already paid for cannot get these basic services".

== United Kingdom ==
The subsidiary company Interhealth Care Services (UK) Ltd ran the Kidderminster Independent Sector NHS Treatment Centre and the Cheshire & Merseyside NHS Treatment Centre in Halton from 2006 to 2011, which delivered over 30,000 orthopaedic procedures during that period. This was one of a number of Independent sector treatment centres established by the Labour Government to reduce waiting lists for elective surgery about which there was considerable controversy and an enquiry by the House of Commons Health Committee.

Wyre Forest's independent MP Richard Taylor reluctantly conceded in 2009 that the InterHealth centre located in an empty ward at Kidderminster Hospital (which he fought to keep open as an acute centre) had done a "very good job" replacing hips and knees, fast and well, without the high failure rate experienced elsewhere.

The Merseyside centre was notable for the speed of construction. The first patients were admitted only 17 months from the start of design work on the £44m construction project. Pressure was put on local GPs to refer patients to the centre, rather than to NHS hospitals, because the primary care trust had to pay for this activity whether or not it is used and, the contract was worth c£30million pa and generated operating profits for the company in excess of £9m pa. When the contract finished the facility was taken over by Warrington & Halton Hospitals NHS Foundation Trust. This was in spite of the centre achieving the highest patient satisfaction ratings of all NHS providers, zero MRSA or C-diff in over 20,000 procedures, and a petition signed by over 10,000 to retain Interhealth Canada as the operator. Having paid around £32 million to repurchase the building at the end of the five-year contract, the centre sat empty for several years.

It has a contract to run Braintree Community Hospital from 2010 until 2015 with options to extend to 2017. This contract was sold to Serco.
