= Elitour =

Elitour is the Greek Medical Tourism Council. It is associated with the Greek National Tourism Organization.

Dr Giorgos Patoulis is the President of the council. He is also President of the Athens Medical Association and the Central Union of Municipalities of Greece. He is a proponent of Greece's thermal natural resources, and says that "Thermal tourism is a dominant lever in the National Health Tourism Strategic Plan."

Mr. Petros Mamalakis is the General Secretary.

It organised a Health Tourism Day in March 2018.

It assisted in organising the International Medical Travel Journal Medical Travel Summit in Athens in May 2018. and a Medical Tourism Symposium in November 2018 which was addressed by Giorgos Tzilalas, the General Secretary of Tourism Policy and Development and Mr. G. Giannopoulos the Secretary General of the Ministry of Health and was intended to facilitate collective effort with the formulation of a national strategy.

The board held a meeting in April 2018, shortly after their election with Elena Kountoura the Minister of Tourism to coordinate a strategy for the organized development of thematic tourism products.

It has organised the World Institute of Greek Doctors in order to mobilise the support of Greek expatriate doctors.

In 2022 it signed Memoranda of Understanding with the Hellenic Chamber of Hotels and Athens International Airport planning the creation of travel packages offering health, spa and wellness tourism options.
