= One To One Midwives =

English midwifery company

One To One Midwives was an independent English midwifery company founded by Joanne Parkington, a midwife in Birkenhead. The company was officially named One to One (North West) Ltd. On 29 July 2019, Joanne Parkington informed her staff the company would cease trading on 31 July 2019.

The company signed a contract to provide midwifery services with NHS Wirral Clinical Commissioning Group in November 2011. The company provided a single midwife to see women through antenatal care, birth and postnatal care. Midwives working for the company were allowed to go into NHS hospitals to act as advocates of support if the woman chooses a hospital birth. One to One Midwives had a 33% home birth rate, compared to the National average of 2%. They aimed to ensure continuity of care. It was alleged that the company misled women about their low rates of intervention, instrumental deliveries, Caesarean sections and stillbirths because those women were transferred to hospital for assistance when there was a problem.

One to One Midwives were available across Essex and the Northwest of England under Any Qualified Provider rules. In November 2017 the company celebrated the birth of its 10,000th baby since starting in 2011 on the Wirral. More than 30% were born at home.

Two of their midwives were shortlisted for the 2019 MaMa awards.

== Controversy ==
In October 2014, after the death of two babies, it was reported that NHS England had launched an investigation led by Trafford Clinical Commissioning Group. Andrew Gwynne MP, from Labour's shadow health team, said it was vital that the results were made public. He said that private providers are not subject to Freedom of Information laws. “If they are providing a public service, with public funds, for the benefit of the public, they should not be outside of scrutiny". The company claims that the report by the Manchester Evening News was misleading. The babies were born in hospital and died of natural causes, one at a few days old and one at a few weeks. The review performed by the Greater Manchester Clinical Commissioning Groups was not an investigation into the deaths but a quality review on the service that they provide. They say the article is a direct result of their challenging the “status quo” in relation to maternity services.

One to One Midwives responded to the article drafted by the Manchester Evening News, quoting: "In order to reassure those of you that may be receiving care from One to One I would like to correct a number of inaccuracies in the article. Both of the babies died of natural causes, one baby died at a few days old and one baby died at a few weeks. Both of the babies were born in hospital and there were no concerns raised about the care the mothers or babies had received from One to One. Following on from the sad events both families continued to receive care and support from their One to One midwives."

The company offices in Warrington had graffiti reading ‘not NHS’ scrawled on the shutters twice in May 2018.

In July 2020 the Warrington Guardian reported that the company had failed to pay bills to maternity units in Warrington, St Helens, Liverpool, Chester, Mid Cheshire and Wirral when they took over woman’s care when there were complications they couldn't handle. The outstanding debts totaled more than £2.6 million. Between 2013 and 2019 the company was paid a total of £5,834,242 by Wirral Clinical Commissioning Group, the lead commissioner. Parkington called the CCG tariff ‘not viable or sustainable’ just before the company collapsed.

In 2022 NHS England produced a report critical of how NHS providers dealt with the company, noting a “them and us” culture, a lack of understanding about the service, and concerns that were often “unfounded” being raised about the service.
