= Angus Wallace =

Scottish orthopedic surgeon

William Angus Wallace (born 31 October 1948) is a Scottish orthopaedic surgeon. He is Professor of Orthopaedic and Accident Surgery at the Faculty of Medicine & Health Sciences of the University of Nottingham. He came to widespread public notice for a life-saving surgery he performed using improvised equipment on a British Airways flight in 1995, and for treating Wayne Rooney before the 2006 FIFA World Cup.

== Early life and career ==
Wallace grew up near Dundee, Scotland. He attended the High School of Dundee and the University of St Andrews.

In 1989, he treated a number of victims of the Kegworth air disaster, in which a British Midland flight crashed onto the embankment of the M1 motorway, and conducted further investigations into injuries sustained in the crash. Following a half-decade of research, he concluded that passengers failed to adopt the brace position correctly, resulting in many injuries; his research team's suggestion of a different brace position had been adopted by all UK airlines by 1999.

== In-flight surgery with a coat-hanger and silverware ==
By 1995, Wallace had already achieved the respect of the medical community for his work in orthopaedic surgery, but he came to wider public attention that year when he and fellow doctor Tom Wong performed a mid-air surgery to save a woman's life. While British Airways Flight 032 from Hong Kong to London was still on the ground, Wallace and Wong briefly examined a fellow passenger complaining of arm pains. She stated she had fallen from a "bike", by which Wallace assumed she meant a bicycle. They concluded she had a fractured bone in her arm, and after takeoff returned to apply a splint. However, in the flight's second hour, the passenger further complained of chest pain. It emerged that she had not merely fallen from a bicycle but had been flung to the ground while riding on a motorcycle that collided with a car; Wallace suspected she had previously concealed the extent of her injuries so as to avoid being taken off the flight.

Upon further examination, Wallace and Wong discovered that in addition to arm and rib fractures, the passenger had developed a tension pneumothorax due to a puncture in her left lung, and realised that she might die if the pressure in her pleural cavity went unrelieved. Wallace did not deem a landing at the nearest airport in Delhi to be viable either, because the increase in air pressure during descent could also kill his patient, and thus the only option was to perform an immediate surgery. With the limited medical equipment on board, Wallace and Wong had to improvise heavily. The medical kit had lidocaine – a local anaesthetic – but the catheter in the kit was designed only for urinary catheterisation and was too soft for use as a chest tube. The doctors fashioned a trocar from a metal clothes hanger to stiffen the catheter, and a check valve from a bottle of water with holes poked in the cap. They sterilised their equipment in cognac, and began surgery by making an incision in the patient's chest, but with no surgical clamps available, Wong had to hold the incision open with a knife and fork while Wallace inserted the catheter. The whole surgery lasted about ten minutes; the doctors successfully released the trapped air from the patient's chest, and she spent the rest of the flight uneventfully eating and watching in-flight movies.

In the aftermath, Wallace and Wong published a brief article in the British Medical Journal about the incident. Wallace also testified before a parliamentary committee investigating British airlines' alleged lack of investment in on-board medical equipment. He was even more critical of US airlines in this regard, noting that his efforts would have been impossible with typical US airline medical kits not even containing aspirin, and stated that "There needs to be a major change in attitudes in the U.S., both from the government and from the airlines."

== Later career ==
Wallace would go on to work in sports medicine, and became chairman of the National Sports Medicine Institute. After a 2002 spate of broken metatarsals – normally a rather uncommon injury – among footballers including David Beckham, Gary Neville, and Danny Murphy, he expressed his concerns that the game of football was being played "harder" in recent years and that as a result "the forces applied to the bones are more frequent and possibly greater ... and it could be that the bones are being over-strained". He treated a number of famous athletes, including Wayne Rooney, who had been referred to him by England national football team doctor Leif Swärd, earlier a medical school classmate of his.

Wallace has also spoken out about a number of systemic issues in health care provision. A 2006 article of his in the British Medical Journal drew widespread media attention for its negative assessment of independent sector treatment centres (ISTCs). He focused on the high rate of complication in hip replacement surgery, stating that some ISTCs had failure rates of as high as 20 times the expected 1% baseline, and noted serious errors such as failure to apply bone cement and joint replacements with an incorrect ball size. He attributed this to inadequate oversight of junior overseas-qualified ISTC doctors by seniors with more experience in the practice of medicine, and suggested that the NHS' own personnel management policies, in particular "additionality" – forbidding NHS doctors from working in ISTCs for six months after their separation from the NHS – was contributing to the problem. He also criticised the false economy of providing funding to ISTCs in response to NHS wait times for surgeries, noting that the NHS was often left to "pick up the pieces" and the costs after poorly-performed surgeries by ISTCs.

Among his criticisms of Nottingham University Hospitals NHS Trust, he questioned a five-year contract signed with Barlborough Treatment Centre which saw them being paid up front regardless of how many operations they performed – of concern because the centre's inconvenient location for patients from Nottingham meant that it was rather underused – and has complained of the high number of cancelled operations due to budget cutbacks.
