= Independent Healthcare Providers Network =

- Abbreviation: IHPN
- Chief Executive: David Hare
- Website: www.ihpn.org.uk

The Independent Healthcare Providers Network (IHPN), formerly known as the NHS Partners Network, is a representative body for independent sector healthcare providers in the United Kingdom.

The body was formed in 2005 to provide a voice for private health companies, and was initially made up of organisations involved in the government's Independent Sector Treatment Centre programme.

It was formerly part of the NHS Confederation, an independent membership body for organisations in the National Health Service, but became an independent entity in 2020.

The members of the IHPN are independent healthcare providers including large hospital groups, diagnostics providers, third-sector organisations and providers of primary, community and dental care. They include not-for-profit providers.

== Organisation ==
Following a vote at the 2007 NHS Confederation Annual Conference, the network became part of the NHS Confederation. Since Autumn 2008 its membership has expanded to include independent sector healthcare organisations providing NHS patient care in primary and community care, in addition to diagnostics and acute and elective surgery.

David Hare has been chief executive since November 2013, when he replaced David Worskett. The organisation has a strategic council which includes leaders of some of its largest members.

It has an independent chair, Seema Kennedy, who was appointed in 2023.

== Response to 2020 pandemic ==
In March 2020, the IHPN brokered the block-booking by NHS England of almost all services and facilities at the country's private hospitals.
