= Independent sector treatment centre =

Independent sector treatment centres (ISTCs) are private-sector owned treatment centres contracted within the English National Health Service to treat NHS patients free at the point of use. They are sometimes referred to as 'surgicentres' or 'specialist hospitals'. ISTCs are often co-located with NHS hospitals. They perform common elective (i.e. non-emergency) surgery and diagnostic procedures and tests. Typically they undertake 'bulk' surgery such as hip replacements, cataract operations or MRI scans rather than more complex operations such as neurosurgery.

The NHS Plan 2000 originally conceived of opening eight treatment centres by 2005, but by August 2005 at least 25 had been opened, with more being planned. 46 NHS treatment centres opened between 2003 and 2009, treating approximately 300,000 patients a year with high rate of patient satisfaction (>94%).

== Contracts ==
Wave I ISTCs worked on pre-arranged central government bulk contracts nominally at or below the national tariff on which NHS hospitals can charge commissioning NHS primary care trusts. These contracts included a profit margin. Additional costs associated with the programme, up to a ceiling of 25% over and above the NHS Equivalent Cost, were paid for by central Government. Treatments were paid for in advance by central government whether or not the numbers paid for were taken up and regardless of success rates. The rationale was that the waiting times for patients are cut by separating routine elective surgery and tests from emergency work.

Referral rates varied across the country, with some ISTCs performing as much 115% of their contracted volumes but with the average referral rate around 85%. Pressure was put on local GPs to refer patients to the centres, rather than to NHS hospitals, because the primary care trusts had to pay for activity whether or not it was used. According to the NHS Partners Network, which represents private providers working within the health service, GP referral rates were rising in 2009 as patients report positive experiences back to their GPs.

In 2009 a British Medical Journal paper concluded that up to £927m of the £1.5bn first wave of ISTC contracts "may have been paid to ISTCs for patients who did not receive treatment". This was based on a Scottish example and does not in fact reflect the experience of the English ISTC program, where referrals have been more in line with the expectations of the original contracts and continue to grow.

== Debate ==
The Department of Health claims stated that by concentrating on a set type of procedures they are able to streamline the patient care pathway, resulting in an improved patient experience and help the NHS to quickly meet waiting time targets; however, the majority of independent research conducted to date has contradicted these claims.

A critique of this development is that more difficult and expensive work is left for NHS hospitals to do, increasing their marginal costs and making them appear less 'efficient'. An article by Angus Wallace in the British Medical Journal (BMJ vol 332 11 March 2006) suggested that treatments may be proportionally less successful in ISTCs due to the employment of inexperienced or less fully trained staff with less backup than the NHS facilities. This could result in the NHS having to fund difficult revision operations (insofar as they can be so revised) and would defeat the object of the exercise. However, a subsequent study conducted by the researchers from London School of Hygiene & Tropical Medicine and the Royal College of Surgeons of England confirmed the high quality of care, concluding that "patients undergoing cataract surgery or hip replacements in ISTCs achieved a slightly greater improvement … than those treated in NHS facilities" and "Patients treated in ISTCs were less likely to report post-operative problems than those treated in NHS facilities…"(BMC Health Services Research 2008. 8:78). ISTC contracts typically exclude referrals of older, fatter and sicker patients, so comparisons with results in NHS hospitals who deal with these more difficult patients is difficult.

In the 2008 Healthcare Commission 2008 NHS Inpatient Survey, ISTCs scored highly on a number of measures, including overall quality of care.

A British Medical Journal study in 2011 concluded: " Patients undergoing surgery in ISTCs were slightly healthier and had less severe conditions than those undergoing surgery in NHS providers. Some outcomes were better in ISTCs, but differences were small compared with the impact ISTCs could have on the provision of elective services.". Their findings supported the idea that separating elective surgical care from emergency services could improve the quality of care.

== Providers ==
The NHS Plan 2000 originally conceived of opening eight treatment centres by 2005, but by August 2005 at least 25 had been opened, with more being planned. A second Wave of ISTCs was completed in 2009 and those marked the end of the centrally planned centres. It was then for local PCTs to make decisions on how best to work with their local ISTCs after the initial five-year contracts have expired. This list of providers was current in 2006. Some of the centres subsequently changed hands.

- Capio Healthcare Limited: Bodmin NHS Treatment Centre, Boston NHS Treatment Centre, Clifton Park NHS Treatment Centre (York), Gainsborough NHS Treatment Centre, Cobalt NHS Treatment Centre (North Tyneside), Blakelands NHS Treatment Centre (Milton Keynes), Banbury NHS Treatment Centre, Ashford NHS Treatment Centre (Surrey)
- Clinicenta Ltd – owned by Carillion: Hemel Hempstead Hospital. Lister Hospital (Stevenage)
- Interhealth Canada – Cheshire & Merseyside NHS Treatment Centre (Halton), Kidderminster Independent Sector NHS Treatment Centre
- Mercury Health Ltd a division of Tribal Group, sold to Care UK in January 2007: Mid and South Buckinghamshire NHS Diagnostic Centre, Portsmouth NHS Treatment Centre, Will Adams NHS Treatment Centre (Gillingham), Haywards Heath NHS Treatment Centre
- Nations Healthcare Ltd: Nations Healthcare Eccleshill NHS Treatment Centre (Bradford), Burton upon Trent NHS Treatment Centre, Nottingham NHS Treatment Centre
- Netcare Healthcare UK Limited: Netcare ISTC—North Chain (Whitchurch), Netcare ISTC—South Chain, Netcare ISTC Greater Manchester Surgical Centre Trafford General Hospital
- Partnership Health Group Limited: Bideford NHS Treatment Centre, Partnership Health Group ISTC Boston Pilgrim Hospital, Partnership Health Group ISTC Lincoln, Peninsula NHS Treatment Centre (Plymouth), Barlborough NHS Treatment Centre (Chesterfield), Maidstone ISTC, North East London ISTC (Ilford)
- Ramsay Health Care UK
- Spire Healthcare
- UK Specialist Hospitals Ltd bought by Care UK in February 2013: Shepton Mallet NHS Treatment Centre

== Books ==
- Player, Stewart and Leys, Colin (2008), CONFUSE AND CONCEAL: The NHS and Independent Sector Treatment Centres, Merlin Press
