= International Medical Travel Journal =

The International Medical Travel Journal was established in 2007 with a focus on medical tourism. It publishes a biweekly newsletter. Keith Pollard is the Editor in Chief. It runs annual Medical Travel Awards.
