= Centre for Health and the Public Interest =

Charity organization in England

- Founded: 2012
- Services: Independent think-tank
- Key people: Director; David Rowland; Trustees; Prof Colin Leys; Prof David McCoy; Dr Guddi Singh; Dr Jonathon Tomlinson
- Website: chpi.org.uk

The Centre for Health and the Public Interest (CHPI) is a London think tank founded in 2012 to defend "the founding principles of the NHS". It is a registered charity.

Professor Colin Leys was involved in its foundation.

== Research ==
It has produced several reports on the Private finance initiative in the English NHS. It said in 2017 that PFI companies had made pre-tax profits of £831m in the past six years which could have been spent on patient care. In 2022 it pointed out that expenditure on staff, equipment and other capital projects can be cut by an NHS trust, but not their PFI payments. It warned councillors in Newham that NHS sustainability and transformation plans were untested. Its scrutiny of the role of markets and competition in the NHS found that information about quality and safety in private hospitals was not available in the same way as with NHS providers so it was not possible to compare the two. Only seven contracts with private providers had been terminated by clinical commissioning groups due to failings, though 16% of their care budget is spent in the private sector and there are some 15,000 contracts with private providers.

It has also reported on Social care in England It claims that "the quality of care in adult social care has declined over the past two decades as a result of privatisation". The CHPI estimates that £1.5bn annually, (that is 10% of the care home industry's £15bn income), "leaks" and often enriches owners or other firms linked closely to owners. The £1.5bn is shown as rent, profit, directors' fees and debt repayments, instead of going to the care of residents. It is the same amount of money the government promised to give to social care, because of worries about the large cuts to the social care since 2010 when austerity started. The CHPI stated, "It's very difficult to find out where the £15bn ends up." Vivek Kotecha, CHPI research manager who did the above research stated, "Some of the largest care home businesses are extracting a lot of profit disguised as rent and loan repayment costs. This makes it hard for local authorities and individuals to know how much extra funding the industry actually needs and how financially sustainable it really is." The CHPI cautioned that a large increase in public funds for the sector could just produce bigger profits for operators, since many firms lack financial transparency.

In July 2019 it produced a study on Conflicts of Interest between the NHS and the Private Hospital sector in England. It found that more than 600 NHS doctors owned either shares or equipment or both in the private hospitals to which they referred patients. Most of the shareholding was in HCA Healthcare.

In October 2019 it produced an analysis of expenditure on private providers of NHS services in England. It concluded that rather than the 7% of NHS expenditure which the government say was spent in this way in 2018-9, a fairer analysis would produce a figure of 26% – an increase of 20% over the previous year.
