= Colin Leys =

British political scientist

Colin Leys FRSC
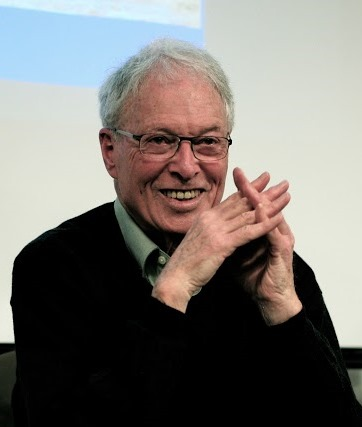
- Born: Colin Temple Leys; April 8, 1931 (age 95); Cardiff, Wales, UK
- Occupation: Professor of political economy
- Children: Tom, Patrick, Sally

Academic background
- Education: MA (PPE) Magdalen College, Oxford

Academic work
- Main interests: Development (in Africa), Comparative politics, British political economy, Policy (Health)

Colin Temple Leys FRSC (born April 8, 1931) is a British political economist who is emeritus professor of political studies at Queen's University, Canada, and an honorary research professor at Goldsmiths, University of London. From 1956 to 1960 he taught at Balliol College, Oxford and then became the first Principal of Kivukoni College in Dar es Salaam, before holding chairs at Makerere University, Uganda, and the universities of Sussex, Nairobi, Sheffield, and Queen's. Until his retirement from Queen's in 1996 his research focused mainly on African development. He has since worked mainly on the political economy of Britain, but from 1997 to 2010 he was co-editor with Leo Panitch of the Socialist Register. From 2000 onwards he became involved in the defence of the British National Health Service (NHS) against successive government attempts to marketise and privatise it. With Stewart Player he co-authored two books on the NHS and was one of the founders of a respected think tank, the Centre for Health and the Public Interest.

== Early life and education ==
Leys is the oldest of the six children of a social worker and a doctor. He was educated at Edinburgh Academy and Dulwich College, where he studied Latin and ancient Greek. As a teenager in Inverness, Scotland he developed a lasting love of the countryside and natural history.

After winning an Open Exhibition in classics at Magdalen College, Oxford, and completing his national service, Leys passed Law Moderations in 1951, switched to Philosophy, Politics and Economics (PPE), was awarded an Honorary Demyship in 1952, and took a first in PPE in 1953. A significant influence was membership in the 'Cole Group', an evening seminar for a small group of students run by GDH Cole, the Chichele Professor of Social and Political Theory and a leading Fabian and co-operator. Leys co-edited the Labour Club's newspaper, the Oxford Clarion, and in 1951, with the late Sir Gerald Kaufmann, wrote an election manifesto called 'Labour Believes in Socialism'. From 1953 to 1956 he was a Junior Research Fellow in Politics at Balliol College, Oxford, and spent 1955–56 researching in Southern Rhodesia. Throughout these years he was mentored and greatly helped by WJM Mackenzie, professor of Government at Manchester.

== Career ==
From 1956 to 1960 Leys was an Official Fellow and Tutor in Politics at Balliol, but took an opportunity to return to Africa in 1960 as the first Principal of Kivukoni College, established in Dar es Salaam by Julius Nyerere to train Tanzanians for leading public roles after independence. In 1962, Leys moved to Makerere University, Uganda, as head of a new department of political science, and subsequently served from 1969 to 1971 as head of the department of government at the University of Nairobi. In between these two periods in East Africa he was professor of politics at the University of Sussex and a Fellow of the Institute of Development Studies, subsequently moving to Sheffield from 1972 to 1975, and then to Queen's University, Canada, from 1976 to 1996. His last piece of field work in Africa was in Namibia in 1993–95, studying the role of SWAPO in the country's post-war political economy with Professor John S. Saul of York University, Toronto, and a team of South African and Canadian researchers.

Leys's initial interest in Africa was prompted by reading the anti-racist books on Kenya written in the inter-war years by his half-uncle Norman Leys, a doctor in the colonial medical service (Kenya, The Colour Bar in East Africa, and Last Chance in Kenya): Colin Leys's initial field work in the Rhodesias confronted exactly the same problem. Later, in East Africa, his focus shifted to the issues of 'nation-building' in ethnically diverse ex-colonies and, finally, to the formation of new African classes, and especially proto-capitalist classes, and the different paths of national development chosen by newly independent African governments. The contribution of theorists of neo-colonialism and dependency such as Frantz Fanon and Andre Gunder Frank to understanding these developments led Leys to engage more seriously with the classical Marxist tradition and influenced his later work on the development of advanced capitalist countries under the impact of globalisation. Other activities during these years included writing commissioned reports on the creation of universities in Mauritius, the Bahamas, and Namibia; serving on a commission on the electoral system of Mauritius; co-editing with Leo Panitch the annual Socialist Register; and founding and chairing the Centre for Health and the Public Interest in London. From 1966 to 1976 he co-edited the Journal of Commonwealth Political Studies (subsequently Commonwealth & Comparative Politics).

== Major publications ==
As of 2017, Leys has published 33 books and 68 chapters and journal papers. Among his major publications, European Politics in Southern Rhodesia (1959) was one of the first African "country studies". It traced the origins and underpinnings of white supremacy in the Rhodesias and correctly predicted the consolidation of racist government in Southern Rhodesia that followed the collapse of the Central African Federation in 1963.

Underdevelopment in Kenya: the political economy of neo-colonialism (1975) described the emergence of the ethnically-based post-independence class system in Kenya and the constraints imposed on development by the complex dependence of the country's new capitalist class on external forces. In 1978 Leys modified his view of the limits imposed by these constraints, giving rise to a so-called "Kenya Debate".

In The Rise and Fall of Development Theory (1996) Leys summed up three decades of work on development, arguing for the reinstatement of a focus on the political assumptions of development that had characterised the study of development before the onset of neoliberal globalisation.

Market-Driven Politics: Neoliberal Democracy and the Public Interest (2001) tested the hypothesis that in a fully globalised capitalist economy, with free capital movement, advanced capitalist countries such as Britain would find their development constrained by global market forces in much the same way that ex-colonies had always been.

== Honours ==
- Fellow of the Royal Society of Canada (FRSC), 1985
- Hon. D.C.L., University of Mauritius, 1986
- Ethel Meade Award, Ontario Health Coalition, 2011

== Key works ==
- European Politics in Southern Rhodesia (Oxford, 1959)
- Underdevelopment in Kenya; The Political Economy of Neocolonialism (James Currey and University of California Press, 1975)
- Politics in Britain (Heinemann Educational Books 1983, revised edition published by Verso 1986 and 1989)
- The Rise and Fall of Development Theory (Indiana University Press, 1996)
- Namibia's Liberation Struggle: The two-edged sword (with John S. Saul, James Currey and Ohio University Press, 1995)
- The End of Parliamentary Socialism (with Leo Panitch, Verso, 1997)
- Market-Driven Politics: Neoliberal democracy and the public interest (Verso, 2001)
- Histories of Namibia: Living through the liberation struggle (edited with Susan Brown, Merlin Press, 2005)
- The Plot Against the NHS (with Stewart Player, Merlin Press, 2011)
- There is an archive of 16 files of papers relating to his research for Politicians and Policies: An essay on politics in Acholi, Uganda, 1962–1965 (East African Publishing House, 1967) held at the University of Sussex.
