= LaingBuisson =

LaingBuisson is a business intelligence provider across health, care and education, headquartered in Angel, London. It provides insights, data and analysis of market structures, policy and strategy and is the chosen provider of independent sector healthcare market data to the UK Government's Office for National Statistics.

The company was founded in 1986 by the Executive Chairman William Laing, a healthcare economist and commentator on health and social care. Prior to setting up LaingBuisson, he worked at the Association of the British Pharmaceutical Industry and was a deputy director at the Office of Health Economics. Henry Elphick was the CEO from 2016-2021 and he and the former Secretary of State for Health, Stephen Dorrell, are non executive directors.

The business provides market intelligence, consulting, data and patient acquisition tools.

Market intelligence includes market reports, journals, events and awards, including the LaingBuisson Awards, which recognise innovation and excellence across the UK health and social care sector. Its international business includes market reports, consulting and the 2 journals Healthcare Markets international and the International Medical Travel Journal, of which Keith Pollard is the Editor in Chief It also organises Medical Travel Summits - the conference in Athens in May 2018 was organised in conjunction with Elitour, the Greek Medical Tourism Council.

Consulting includes work for investors and Government. It was awarded a contract by the Department of Health and Social Care in October 2018 to review the NHS-Funded Nursing Care rate, which determines payments by the NHS for nursing home care in England. It has also assisted the Competition and Markets Authority in investigations.
