= Cosmetic surgery in the United Kingdom =

At present there are no restrictions on who may perform cosmetic procedures in England which do not involve surgery. In October 2026 Karin Smyth, the health minister announced proposals to " to drive cosmetic cowboys out of the market and raise standards across the board, giving reputable businesses a fair chance to thrive by helping people identify safe, qualified providers they can trust." New rules are proposed to come into force in Spring 2027.

There is already a licensing scheme for Botox clinics in England. In Scotland there are rules about where cosmetic procedures must be performed.

Cosmetic surgery and other high-risk procedures will banned for people under 18.

Fillers injected into parts of the body other than the face will be legally defined as cosmetic surgical procedures, meaning only doctors could perform them.

Procedures covered include liquid butt Lifts, dermal micro-coring, vampire facials and chemical peels. Only nurses, midwives and pharmacists who have completed an accredited training course will be allowed to perform them.
