= NHS Support Federation =

Pressure group supporting UK National Health Service

The NHS Support Federation is a pressure group that supports the UK National Health Service. It was founded in 1989 and campaigns "to protect and improve the NHS, keeping it true to its founding principles." It is based in Brighton. It helped to establish the Keep Our NHS Public campaign.

Professor Harry Keen was the president of the federation and an active member for many years.

It monitors the NHS tendering processes. Jeremy Corbyn cited the work of the Federation in his 2016 campaign for re-election as Labour Party leader, as showing that £16 billion in NHS contracts had been awarded "through the market" since April 2013.

In 2017 it produced an analysis of Sustainability and transformation plans pointing out that cuts in acute services were being made without prior investment in community facilities.
