= Keep Our NHS Public =

English organisation against healthcare privatisation

Keep Our NHS Public logo

Keep Our NHS Public is a campaigning organisation, with local groups across England, committed to reversing what it describes as the ongoing privatisation of the NHS and its services.

== History ==
The group was founded in 2005 by the NHS Consultants Association, the NHS Support Federation and Health Emergency. It was very active in the campaign against the Health and Social Care Act 2012.

It has local groups which are involved in campaigns against the closure or reorganisation of local hospitals, such as the Save Lewisham Hospital Campaign. It attracted support from many existing health related campaigns such as Save Finsbury Health Centre It has been very vocal in denouncing the use of private health providers to treat patients outside the health service.

== Notable campaigns ==
- Campaign to keep the NHS out of future UK trade deals
- Campaign by Save Lewisham Hospital to oppose Health Secretary Jeremy Hunt's plans to close it

== See also ==
- History of the National Health Service (England)
- Private providers of NHS services
- Health care in the United Kingdom
