= Private Healthcare Information Network =

Organisation that promotes private healthcare companies in the United Kingdom

The Private Healthcare Information Network (PHIN) was established by the United Kingdom Competition and Markets Authority under the Private Healthcare Market Investigation Order 2014. Jayne Scott, a non-executive director with the Scottish Government, is the Chair of the network. Ian Gargan has been Chief Executive of the network since September 2022.

== Overview ==
Private Healthcare Information Network
- Abbreviation: PHIN
- Headquarters: The Record Hall London, EC1N 7RJ
- Chief Executive: Dr Ian Gargan
- Chair: Jayne Scott
- Website: https://www.phin.org.uk/

It is intended to improve the availability of information to patients considering private healthcare service, making the information comparable with that which is already available for the National Health Service. The order specifies 11 performance measures which are to be collected.

In May 2017 it published data about 149 common procedures at more than 200 hospitals showing the number of patient admissions, the average length of stay for each procedure, and the Friends and Family Test scores. This is said to cover over 80% of privately funded healthcare in the UK. It is planned to publish more detailed data than the Care Quality Commission.

Since 2017 the Care Quality Commission has used information supplied by the network as part of its regulation of the independent sector.

Its annual report for 2016-17 contained information for 285 hospitals providing private healthcare services, but 230 hospitals had not submitted sufficient data to appear on the network's website. These included 151 that had not submitted live data at all, most of which were NHS hospitals, in respect of their private activity.

In June 2018 it was announced that the network would be developing an Acute Data Alignment Programme with NHS Digital to integrate the data it collects on about 750,000 privately funded hospital episodes each year into NHS systems and standards. In December 2019 it published information on health outcomes for patients who had privately funded care in the UK, covering the period 1 July 2018 to 30 June 2019, for 282 independent hospitals and NHS Private Patient Units.

In October 2022, the Competition and Markets Authority announced that it was escalating its public enforcement action against private hospitals and consultants.

In March 2023, the Competition and Markets Authority published the action plans of 40 hospitals currently in breach of the order. The action plans outline the steps the hospitals will take to achieve compliance within six months.
