= NHS Gooroo =

NHS Gooroo is a website and company run by Rob Findlay which carries information about NHS performance, particularly waiting lists and performance against NHS targets.

Findlay, who is based in Shrewsbury, formerly worked in the Treasury health expenditure team.

Findlay explains the seasonal variations in performance against waiting list targets. The company regularly produces maps showing A&E, RTT and cancer waits for English NHS trusts which are featured in the Health Service Journal.

The company was acquired by Insource Ltd in May 2021.
