= Any Qualified Provider =

Contractual system within the English National Health Service

Any Qualified Provider (AQP) is a contractual system within the NHS internal market of the English National Health Service. The system was introduced under the Labour administration in 2009/10 under the name "Any Willing Provider" and was accelerated under the coalition Government which formed in 2010. In 2011 the name of the system was changed to "Any Qualified Provider", although there were no substantial changes to its operation.

Its implementation was achieved through the NHS operating framework and a strong central team based in the Department of Health that supported and oversaw local implementation. It did not require any statutory instrument to achieve its aims and was often incorrectly considered to be part of the reforms associated with the Health and Social Care Act 2012.

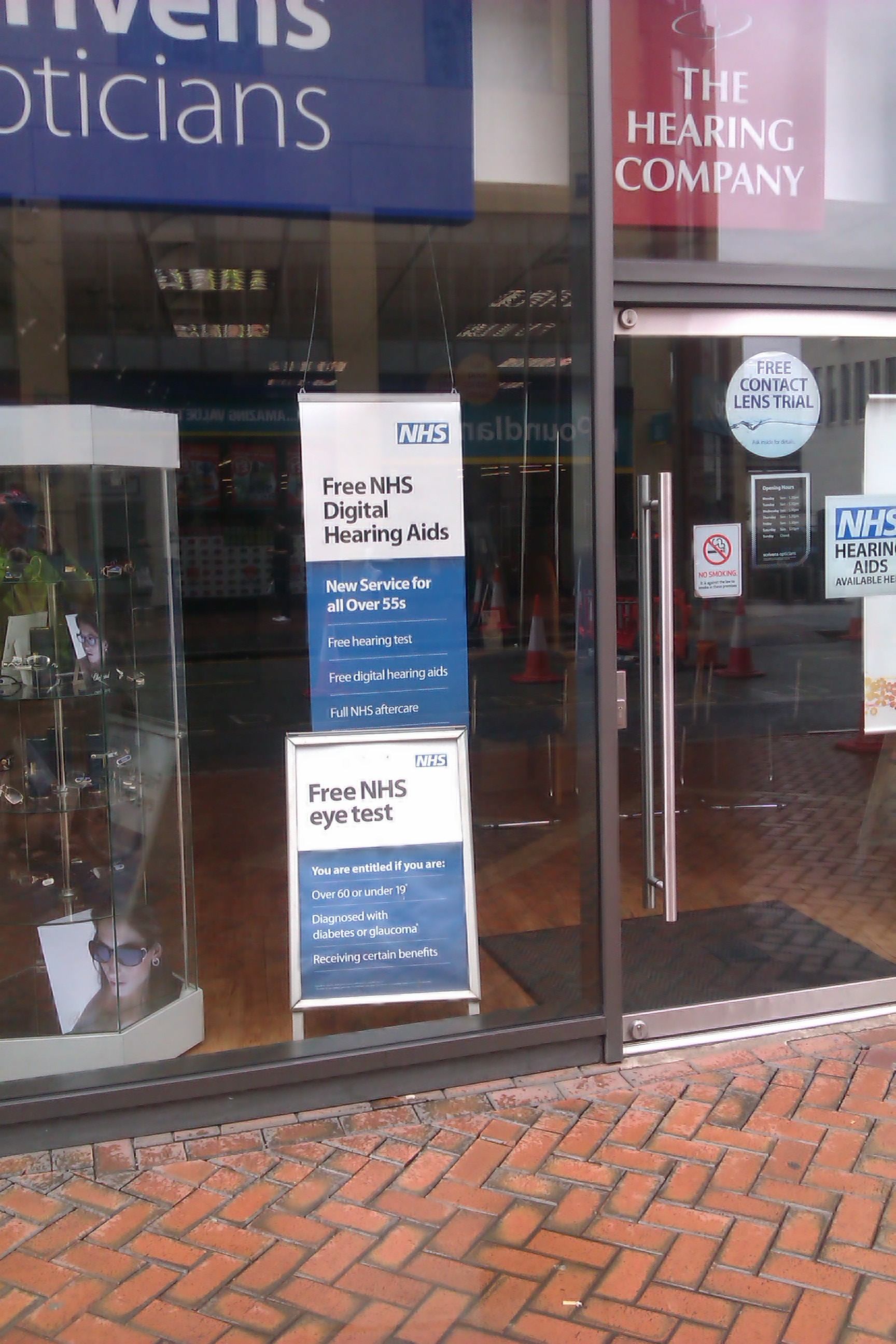
NHS Hearing Aids and eye tests June 2013

== Services ==
In September 2012, 39 services were specified as suitable for the AQP regime:

- ADHD and autism
- Adult hearing
- Anti coagulation
- Child and adolescent mental health services (CAMHS) tier 2
- Community cardiac diagnosis
- Community fracture clinic
- Continence
- Continuing care
- Continuing care (children)
- Continuing care adults
- Continuing care other
- Core nail surgery
- CT (X-ray computed tomography)
- Dermatology
- Diabetes education and self-management for ongoing and newly diagnosed (DESMOND)
- Dual-energy X-ray absorptiometry (DXA, previously DEXA)
- Diabetes education
- Diagnostics
- ECG (Electrocardiography)
- Endoscopy
- Glaucoma
- Lymphoedema
- Mental health spot placements
- Minor oral surgery
- MRI (Magnetic resonance imaging)
- Musculoskeletal (MSK)
- MSK carpal tunnel management
- Non-obstetric ultrasound
- Ophthalmology
- Pain services
- Podiatry
- Psychological therapies
- Smoking cessation
- Supported accommodation
- Termination of pregnancy
- Vasectomy
- Venous leg ulcers
- Weight management
- Wheelchairs

== Development ==
Originally each primary care trust (PCT) was required to introduce at least three AQP services, but by April 2013 the grip of the programme loosened with reduction in central oversight, and the regime become more permissive. A survey by the Health Service Journal in August 2014 found that clinical commissioning groups enthusiasm for using 'any qualified provider' to increase competition and extend patient choice had declined. Of 183 groups surveys, 77 did not open any new AQP services in 2013/4, and 109 had no plans to introduce any. Those that had introduced new services mostly concentrated on audiology, non-obstetric ultrasound, podiatry, MRI, eye care, and back and neck pain services.

Nottingham City Clinical Commissioning Group is bringing in a wider range of providers for phlebotomy services and a treatment room service for minor injuries and wound treatment which offers GPs an alternative to local walk-in centres or acute emergency departments. Great Yarmouth and Waveney CCG is bringing in new neurological rehabilitation service providers using AQP.

By 2015 it was clear that, following the increase in services made available, continued enthusiasm for this approach at national level had faded, and there was only patchy use of it at a local level. There were no requirements for commissioners to use AQP for services after April 2013 and 77 of the 183 CCGs did not open any services to AQP in 2013/14.

== The AQP Regime ==
- Commissioners - generally groups of clinical commissioning groups establish specifications against which potential providers are assessed. This ensures that there is absolute clarity on what services are required. AQP can only work if what is delivered is a standard service.
- Providers are then accredited principally on their ability to meet a range of quality standards, rather than cost. Providers are assessed on their ability to meet established quality standards via external accreditation e.g. by the Care Quality Commission.
- Providers undertake to continue to meet a range of established criteria and standards, thus ensuring that high standards of service are maintained.
- Patients and their referring clinicians can decide upon which provider they wish to use. This facilitates patient choice and empowerment.

This regime is somewhat similar to that which has prevailed in NHS dentistry, pharmacy and optometry since 1948: patients can use any provider they wish.

Guidance was provided by the Department of Health Team, travelling around the UK working with regional teams. An example can be found here

== See also ==
Private medicine in the UK
