= Journal of Southern African Studies =

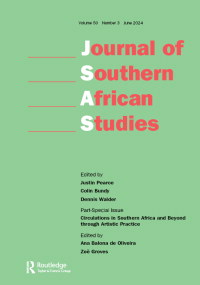
- Discipline: African studies
- Language: English

Publication details
- History: 1974–present
- Publisher: Routledge (United Kingdom)
- Frequency: Quarterly
- Impact factor: 0.676 (ISI, Area Studies) (2014)

Standard abbreviations
- ISO 4: J. South. Afr. Stud.

Indexing
- ISSN: 0305-7070 (print); 1465-3893 (web)
- LCCN: 2001-227376
- JSTOR: 03057070
- OCLC no.: 48532114

Links
- Journal homepage

The Journal of Southern African Studies is an international publication which covers research on the Southern African region, focussing on Angola, Botswana, Eswatini, Lesotho, Malawi, Mozambique, Namibia, South Africa, Zambia, and Zimbabwe, and occasionally also Tanzania, the Democratic Republic of Congo, Madagascar, and Mauritius.
