= Review of African Political Economy =

Academic journal

- Discipline: Political economy
- Language: English
- Edited by: Janet Bujra

Publication details
- History: 1974–present
- Publisher: Taylor & Francis
- Frequency: Quarterly
- Impact factor: 0.988 (2019)

Standard abbreviations
- ISO 4: Rev. Afr. Political Econ.

Indexing
- CODEN: RAPEF9
- ISSN: 0305-6244 (print); 1470-1014 (web)
- LCCN: 75647118
- JSTOR: 03056244
- OCLC no.: 2243506

Links
- Journal homepage; Online archive

The Review of African Political Economy (ROAPE) is a peer-reviewed academic journal covering African political economy. It was founded with the help of Lionel Cliffe and was published quarterly by Taylor & Francis from 1974. In 2023, it was announced that, as of January 2024, the journal's fiftieth anniversary, ROAPE would leave Taylor & Francis and become available online through an open access platform.

The journal focuses in particular on the political economy of inequality, exploitation, and oppression, whether driven by global forces or local ones (such as class, race, community and gender), and to materialist interpretations of change in Africa.

The editor-in-chief is Janet Bujra (University of Bradford).

== Impact and indexing ==
According to the Journal Citation Reports, the journal has a 2019 impact factor of 0.988, ranking it 118th out of 181 journals in the category "Political Science". It is indexed in a number of databases, including Scopus (Elsevier), Social Sciences Citation Index (Clarivate), IBZ Online (De Gruyter), Social Science Premium Collection (ProQuest), Social Sciences Abstracts (EBSCO), ABI/INFORM (ProQuest), Business Source Ultimate (EBSCO), CAB Abstracts (CABI), Humanities Abstracts (EBSCO), and Index Islamicus (Brill).
