= Marcel Liebman =

Belgian Marxist historian (1929–1986)

- Born: 7 July 1929; Brussels, Belgium
- Died: 1 March 1986 (aged 56)
- Spouse: Adeline (m. 1956)

Academic background
- Education: Université libre de Bruxelles

Academic work
- Discipline: History
- Sub-discipline: Intellectual history
- School or tradition: Marxism
- Institutions: Université libre de Bruxelles
- Main interests: History of socialism

Marcel Liebman (7 July 1929 – 1 March 1986) was a Belgian Marxist historian of political sociology and theory, active at the Université libre de Bruxelles and Vrije Universiteit Brussel.

== Life ==
A historian of socialism and of communism, he published a number of well known essays, notably on the Russian Revolution, Leninism, and the history of the labour movement in Belgium. He was also an early initiator of Israeli–Palestinian dialogue.

On 9 July 1943, Marcel's older brother, Henri, was arrested by the Gestapo and sent to Malines. Several weeks later on 31 July, he was transported to Auschwitz with 1,555 other deportees where he was in all probability sent to the gas chambers upon arrival as he had not yet turned 16 years of age. Henri was born 15 October 1927 in Brussels and died in August 1943. Of the 1,556 deportees sent to Auschwitz on 31 July, only 40 returned after the camps were liberated.

From 1962 to 1967, he was editor of the weekly journal La Gauche (The Left) and in 1968 founded the journal Mai (May) which existed until 1973.

In 1976, he participated in the creation of the Association Belgo-Palestinienne, with Naim Khader and Pierre Galand, where he was General-Secretary.

His son Riton Liebman is a comedian, author and director. Riton's actual name is Henri, named after Marcel's lost brother.

A foundation under the directorship Mateo Alaluf was created at the Université libre de Bruxelles upon Liebman's death in 1986. In December 2005, the foundation was converted into the Marcel Liebman Institute. It aims to contribute to socialist thought and the study of the left as well as a critical reflection on the practices of social movements.

== English bibliography ==
=== Books ===
- "Introduction" in Isaac Deutscher, Russia After Stalin (Jonathan Cape, London, 1969).
- The Russian Revolution (Vintage Books, 1972).
- Leninism Under Lenin (Merlin Press, 1973).
- Born Jewish: A Childhood in Occupied Europe (Verso Books, 2005)

=== Essays ===
- "The Webbs and the New Civilisation". Survey. 41. April 1962.
- "Communication on 'Survey' (letter)". New Left Review. I (18). New Left Review. January–February 1963.
- "1914: The Great Schism". Socialist Register. 1. 1964.
- "The Crisis of Belgian Social Democracy". Socialist Register. 3. 1966.
- "Israel, Palestine and Zionism". Socialist Register. 7. 1970.
- Liebman, Marcel (1970), "Lenin in 1905: A Revolution that Shook a Doctrine", in Sweezy, Paul M.; Magdoff, Harry (eds.), Lenin Today: Eight Essays on the Hundredth Anniversary of Lenin's Death, New York: Monthly Review Press
- Liebman, Marcel (1971), "Isaac Deutscher as Historian of the Russian Revolution", in Horowitz, David (ed.), Isaac Deutscher: The Man and His Work, London: Macdonald
- "Bukharinism, Revolution and Social Development". Socialist Register. 12. 1975.
- Liebman, Marcel; Miliband, Ralph (1984). "Reflections on Anti-Communism". Socialist Register.
- Liebman, Marcel; Miliband, Ralph (July 1985). "Reflections on Anti-Communism". Monthly Review. 37 (3): 1. doi:10.14452/MR-037-03-1985-07_1.
- Liebman, Marcel; Miliband, Ralph; Saville, John; Panitch, Leo (December 1985). "Preface". Socialist Register. 22.
- "Reformism Yesterday and Social Democracy Today". Socialist Register. 22. December 1985.
- Liebman, Marcel; Miliband, Ralph (December 1985). "Beyond Social Democracy". Socialist Register. 22.

=== Articles ===
- "Trotsky assassiné," La Gauche (August 1965).
- "Lenin in 1905. A revolution that shook a doctrine," Monthly Review (1970).

Awards
Preceded by Maxime Rodinson	Deutscher Memorial Prize; 1975	Succeeded by Włodzimierz Brus
