= Universities and Left Review =

Defunct socialist magazine

- Founded: 1957
- Final issue Number: Autumn 1959; 7

Universities and Left Review was a socialist magazine that published seven issues between 1957 and 1959.

== History ==
Universities and Left Review was founded in 1957 by Oxford students Raphael Samuel, Gabriel Pearson, Charles Taylor, and Stuart Hall.

The initial impetus behind the magazine came from the events of 1956, particularly the Suez crisis, the Soviet invasion of Hungary and Khrushchev's revelations about the Stalin's purges, that triggered shockwaves throughout the British left. As Hall was later to write, these events were "as significant to us as 1968 was to become to a later generation."

The magazine's first issue was produced in spring of 1957, and contained essays by three of the founding editors, Pearson, Hall and Taylor, as well as contributions from the artist Peter de Francia, Lindsay Anderson the noted British New Wave filmmaker, the economist Joan Robinson, historians E.P. Thompson, Eric Hobsbawm and Isaac Deutscher, and the town planner Graeme Shankland. Later issues would include essays by Samuel, Raymond Williams, Richard Hoggart, Isaac Deutscher, John Strachey, Peter Sedgwick, Ralph Miliband, Karel Reisz, Margot Jefferys, John Berger and others, and feature design by future design director of Penguin Books, Germano Facetti. The photographer Roger Mayne contributed images for the covers of issues 4, 5, 6, and 7.

The magazine was self-consciously inspired by Left Review, the literary and cultural magazine of the Communist Party of Great Britain that developed a sophisticated modernist cultural politics in the 1930s. It was equally inspired by the socialist humanist magazine The New Reasoner, founded by E.P. Thompson in 1956, whose aim was to espouse a form of Marxist humanism against Communist Party orthodoxy. ULR would, however, be marked from its predecessors by its openness to debate, as well the influence of the burgeoning youth culture of late 1950s Britain. Notable was the debate on "classlessness," inaugurated by Hall's essay "A Sense of Classlessness" from ULR 5, that sparked responses from both Samuel and E.P. Thompson in later issues.

In late 1959, ULR merged with fellow socialist magazine New Reasoner to produce the New Left Review.

== See also ==
- New Left
- New Left Review
- New Reasoner
- Communist Party Historians Group
