= Alison Light =

Writer, critic and independent scholar

Alison Light FBA FRSL FRHistS

Personal details
- Born: 4 August 1955 (age 71) Portsmouth, Hampshire, England
- Spouse(s): Raphael Samuel (1987–1996); John O'Halloran (2005–present)
- Education: Churchill College, Cambridge (B.A.); Sussex University (M.A. and D.Phil.)
- Occupation: Writer, critic and independent scholar

Alison Light (born 4 August 1955) is a writer, critic and independent scholar. She is the author of six books to date. In 2020, A Radical Romance, was awarded the PEN Ackerley Prize, the only prize for memoir in the UK. Common People: The History of an English Family (2014) was shortlisted for the Samuel Johnson Prize (now the Baillie Gifford Prize). Her latest book, Red, Red Robin: My Long Goodbye to Home, was published by Weidenfeld and Nicolson in May 2026.

Light has held a number of academic posts and is currently an Honorary Fellow in History and English at Pembroke College, Oxford. She is also an Honorary Professor in the Department of English, University College, London, and an Honorary Professorial Fellow in the Department of English, Edinburgh University. She is a founding member of the Raphael Samuel Archive and History Centre in London.

== Early career ==
Light grew up in Portsmouth, England, and read English at Churchill College, Cambridge, from 1973 to 1976, where she was awarded a B.A. and was a University Scholar. She worked as a school teacher, a cleaner, a researcher for the National Association for Gifted Children, and as a studio manager at the BBC, before taking an M.A. and D.Phil. at Sussex University in 1991. She also taught for the Workers' Educational Association, at the Open University and as a lecturer in English at Brighton Polytechnic from 1984 to 1990.

She published her first reviews and early fiction in the feminist magazine Spare Rib and was for several years a member of the editorial collective of Feminist Review, an academic journal of the British women's movement. Her first academic article on romance fiction in 1984 helped open up the field of British popular culture to serious study and has been much anthologised. Her first book, Forever England: Literature, Femininity and Conservatism between the Wars, is related to interwar studies and studies of "Englishness". It argued that it was impossible to understand ideas about English character in the period, or the changes within literary culture, without recognising the extent to which the female population represented the nation between the wars.

== Raphael Samuel ==
In 1987, Light married Marxist historian Raphael Samuel, with whom she worked closely. From 1984 to 1995, she was a member of History Workshop Popular Literature Group which organised several workshops held at Ruskin College, Oxford, including "The Future of English" (1991), involving over 200 policy-makers, schoolteachers and academics teaching English. In the 1990s, Light also wrote reviews and articles regularly for the New Statesman and the film magazine Sight & Sound. She held a full-time Lectureship in English at Royal Holloway College from 1991 to 1995 and a Research Fellowship in the Department of English at University College London from 1995 to 2003 where she also lectured in 20th-century English and American literature.

After Samuel's death in 1996, Light assembled and donated his papers to create the Raphael Samuel Archive, now held by Bishopsgate Institute in London. She was also a member of the initial team which established the Raphael Samuel History Research Centre, now a public history centre jointly operated by University of East London, Birkbeck and Queen Mary colleges, London University, and the Bishopsgate Institute. Light also donated materials relating to Samuel's mother, the composer and Communist activist Minna Keal (1909–99).

Light edited a posthumous volume of Samuel's essay, Island Stories (Verso, 1998) and published a collection of his essays from New Left Review, The Lost World of British Communism (Verso, 2006). In 2003, she was given a personal Visiting Professorship at the University of East London and from 2006 to 2009 was appointed a Research Professor (part-time) attached to the History Centre, based in the School of Cultural and Media Studies.

== Recent work ==
In 2006, Light took up a personal Chair as Professor of Modern English Literature and Culture (part-time) at Newcastle University, where she taught courses on modernism but also developed work on life writing. She published an edition of Flush: A Biography by Virginia Woolf, with introduction and notes for Penguin Classics (2005) and gave the annual birthday lecture for the Virginia Woolf Society of Great Britain in 2007. Light's second book, Mrs Woolf and the Servants (Fig Tree/Penguin, 2007; Bloomsbury USA, 2008), was both a study of the servants such as Nellie Boxall and Lottie Hope who worked for the Bloomsbury circle and a social history of domestic service. It was highly commended in the Longman-History Today Awards and was longlisted for the Samuel Johnson Prize.

Light's A Radical Romance: A Memoir of Love, Grief and Consolation was published in 2019. In August 2020, it was announced winner of the 2020 PEN/Ackerley Prize. She is currently the co-editor of a series for Edinburgh University Press, The Feminist Library, which launched with her own volume, Inside History: From Popular Fiction to Life-writing.

In 2005, she married John O'Halloran.

== Honours ==
In 2021, Light was elected a Fellow of the British Academy, of the Royal Society of Literature, and of the Royal Historical Society .
