= Shankland =

Shankland is a surname. Notable people with the surname are:

- Alfred Shankland (1877–1952), Dean of Barbados from 1917 to 1938
- Andy Shankland (born 1964), English footballer
- Bert Shankland (1932-2012), Rally driver
- Bill Shankland (1907–1998), Australian rugby league footballer and golfer
- Graeme Shankland (1917–1984), English town planner
- Katrina Shankland (born 1987), American community organizer and politician
- Lawrence Shankland (born 1995), Scottish footballer
- Leith Shankland (born 1991), South African swimmer
- Mark Shankland (born 1995), Scottish footballer
- Robert Shankland (1887–1968), Canadian Victoria Cross recipient
- Robert S. Shankland (1908–1982), American physicist and historian
- Sam Shankland (born 1991), American chess grandmaster
- Warren Shankland (born 1987), South African cricketer
- William Shankland Andrews (1858–1936), American lawyer
