= Partisan Coffee House =

Coffeehouse in London (1958–1962)

Coordinates: 51°30′53″N 0°08′02″W

The Partisan Coffee House was a radical venue of the New Left, at 7 Carlisle Street in the Soho district of London. It was established by historian Raphael Samuel in 1958 in the aftermath of the Suez Crisis and the Soviet invasion of Hungary. It closed in 1962, victim of a "business model" that was hospitable to the penniless intellectuals who patronised it, but wholly unrealistic. In 2026 the building is offered as flexible office space.

== Foundation ==
The group that founded the Partisan initially came together in Oxford, as editors and contributors of the Universities & Left Review magazine (ULR) before it merged with The New Reasoner to form New Left Review. In addition to Raphael Samuel, the group included the late Stuart Hall and Eric Hobsbawm. Funds to buy the Carlisle Street property were raised by soliciting donations and loans from political sympathisers. The Partisan was initially intended to raise funds for the ULR, and it was partly conceived as an alternative to the Italian-style coffee bars which had mushroomed in London in the 1950s.

Major investors included:

- Michael Redgrave, actor
- Ken Tynan, theatre critic
- John Calder, publisher
- Lewis Casson, actor and producer
- Wolf Mankowitz, screenwriter
- Naomi Mitchison, novelist
- Doris Lessing, author

== Layout ==
The primary coffee house, which also served food, occupied the ground floor of the building. Communal tables were situated towards the rear, while a small number of armchairs were available at the front. The venture's financial downfall was largely due to its strict policy of permitting customers to occupy tables for extended periods without making any purchases.

The basement was furnished with more tables, and chess sets were available. Talks, poetry readings, film screenings and informal concerts were a fairly frequent feature of the basement area. The coffee house was open from 10:30 to midnight daily.

Above the coffee house were the library, and the private offices of the ULR.

== Food and drink ==
For most of its life, the Partisan sold cappuccino and croissants for 9d each. Food served included farmhouse soup, borscht, mutton stew, liver dumplings and Whitechapel cheesecake. The menus and some posters were designed by graphic designer Desmond Jeffery.

No alcoholic drinks were served, but they were readily available at any of several nearby pubs, notably The Highlander (now the Nellie Dean) just a few steps away on the corner of Dean Street.

== Patronage ==
The Partisan attracted students, intellectuals, writers, musicians, actors and other theatrical types, all having left-wing sympathies. Among the clientele who were, or became, celebrities were:

- Doris Lessing, author
- Marghanita Laski, journalist
- Karel Reisz, film director
- Lindsay Anderson, theatre and film director
- Arnold Wesker, playwright, and the Centre 42 activists
- Peggy Seeger, folk singer
- Raymond Williams, novelist and critic
- Derek Marlowe, novelist and screenwriter
- Quentin Crisp, "The Naked Civil Servant"
- John Hurt, actor who famously portrayed Crisp in a 1975 made-for television film
- John Malcolm, actor
- John Berger, art critic and author
- Richard Hoggart, author and sociologist
- Christopher Logue, poet and pacifist
- Rod Stewart, entertainer

It was also visited by Special Branch officers who monitored conversations there.

The early Aldermaston Marches (1958–60) were partly planned in the basement of the Partisan, and the membership of the Committee of 100 was also drawn up at the coffee house.

The coffee house was the subject of an edition of the BBC television current affairs series Panorama, presented by Christopher Chataway.

In 2017 the Four Corners Gallery in Bethnal Green, London held an exhibition of memorabilia, documents and film of the cafe.
