= Canadian Dimension =

Canadian left-wing magazine

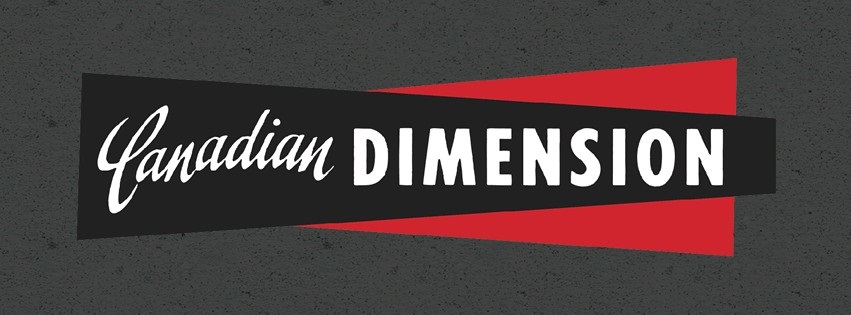
- Categories: Politics
- Publisher: Dimension Publications Inc.
- Founded: 1963
- Country: Canada
- Language: English
- Website: https://canadiandimension.com
- ISSN: 0008-3402
- OCLC: 222920854

Canadian Dimension (CD) is a Canadian political magazine established in 1963 and based in Winnipeg, Manitoba. The publication is known for its left-wing orientation, including viewpoints associated with social democracy and libertarian socialism. In 2019, Canadian Dimension transitioned to a digital-only format.

== History ==
Canadian Dimension was established in 1963 by Cy Gonick, an economist and political activist. In 1975, editorial responsibilities shifted to a collective structure. During its print run, which lasted over five decades, the magazine was overseen by a group of writers and activists from various Canadian cities, with Gonick continuing to serve as coordinating editor and publisher.

In 2019, the magazine appointed Harrison Samphir as editor-in-chief. Samphir had previously held roles as web editor and associate publisher. That same year, the magazine ceased print publication and transitioned to a digital-only format.

Throughout its history, Canadian Dimension has published commentary and analysis on political, economic, and social issues. It has also included reviews of books and films, and contributions have reflected a range of left-leaning perspectives.

Over the years, Canadian Dimension has featured contributions from a range of academics, writers, and activists associated with left-wing political thought. Early contributors included Charles Taylor, George Grant, Gad Horowitz, C. B. Macpherson, Kari Levitt, John Warnock, James Laxer, Leo Panitch and Reg Whitaker.

In later years, contributors have included Bryan Palmer, Sam Gindin, Jim Silver, Pam Palmater, Andrea Levy, Rinaldo Walcott, David Moscrop, Peter Kulchyski, Paul Robinson, Yves Engler, Joel Kovel, Boris Kagarlitsky, and Ian Angus. The magazine has aimed to present diverse perspectives within the broader framework of leftist and socialist discourse.

Canadian Dimension has maintained a socialist orientation since its founding. Its early issues focused primarily on economic and political topics and did not regularly address subjects such as feminism, environmentalism, human rights, or LGBTQ+ issues. By the 1980s, the magazine began to include more frequent coverage of these areas.

In subsequent years, the publication adopted a thematic approach to its issues, with each edition often dedicated to a specific topic. Past themes have included urban development, Indigenous issues, arts and culture, food systems, pensions, gender and sexuality, historical events, immigration, the criminal justice system, labor conditions, media criticism, resource extraction, feminism, local activism, student movements, and environmental topics such as climate change and degrowth.
