= John Saville =

Greek-British Marxist historian, long associated with Hull University

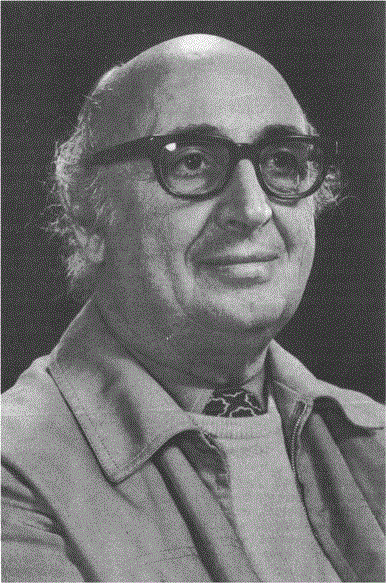
- Born: Orestis Stamatopoulos; 2 April 1916; Morton, West Lindsey, Lincolnshire, England
- Died: 13 June 2009 (aged 93); Sheffield, England
- Education: Royal Liberty School; London School of Economics
- Employer: University of Hull
- Movement: New Left
- Spouse: Constance Betty Saunders (m. 1941; died 2007)
- Children: 4

John Saville (born Orestis Stamatopoulos, Greek: Ορέστης Σταματόπουλος; 2 April 1916 – 13 June 2009) was a Greek-British Marxist historian, long associated with the University of Hull. He was an influential writer on British labour history in the second half of the twentieth century, and also known for his multi-volume work, the Dictionary of Labour Biography, edited in collaboration with others.

== Life and career ==
Saville was born Orestis Stamatopoulos in 1916, in the village of Morton, near Gainsborough, Lincolnshire to an English mother and a Greek father. Saville's father died while he was an infant. In 1937 he changed his name by deed poll to John Saville, taking the surname of his mother's second husband. He was brought up in Romford.

He won a scholarship to Royal Liberty School in London and went on to study at the London School of Economics, where he joined the Communist Party of Great Britain (CPGB). During the war he did not get or seek an officer's commission (against the party line) and was, in his own words, "a good and efficient soldier", advancing from anti-aircraft gunner to gunnery sergeant major-instructor and ultimately regimental sergeant major. He served in Britain and later in India, where he became acquainted with independence activists. An active member of the CPGB, he was deeply involved in the crisis of the CPGB in 1956, following the Soviet invasion of Hungary, after which he left the party.

Saville emerged as one of the supporters of the New Reasoner group of dissident Marxists who condemned the Soviet intervention in Hungary in 1956. Saville became professor of economic history at the University of Hull in 1973, where he had taught since 1947. He was associated with the Socialist Register (editor with Ralph Miliband) and the multi-volume Dictionary of Labour Biography; from 1972 onwards he was one of the editors of the ten-volume Dictionary.

His wife Constance died in 2007. He was survived by their three sons, a daughter, and two granddaughters.

His acquaintances and co-thinkers included the MI5 agent planted at his home in Hull, John Griffith, Stuart Hall, Philip Larkin, Doris Lessing, Ralph Miliband, Sir John Pratt, Raphael Samuel and E.P. Thompson.

== Works ==
- Ernest Jones, Chartist: Selections from the Writings and Speeches of Ernest Jones (1952) editor
- Democracy and the Labour Movement: Essays in Honour of Dona Torr (1954) editor
- Rural Depopulation in England and Wales, 1851–1951 (1957)
- The Age of Improvement 1783–1867 (1964) editor with Asa Briggs
- The Red Republican & The Friend of the People: A Facsimile Reprint (1966, 2 volumes) editor
- Essays in Labour History 1886–1923 (1967) editor with Asa Briggs, and later volumes
- A Selection of the Political Pamphlets of Charles Bradlaugh (1970) editor
- Selection of the Social and Political Pamphlets of Annie Besant (1970), editor
- Dictionary of Labour Biography (from 1972, ten volumes) editor with Joyce M. Bellamy, David E. Martin
- Marxism and History (1974) Inaugural Lecture, University of Hull, 6 November 1973
- Working Conditions in the Victorian Age: Debates on the Issue from 19th Century Critical Journals (1973)
- Marxism and Politics (1977) editor with Ralph Miliband, Marcel Liebman, Leo Panitch
- Ideology and the Labour Movement: Essays Presented to John Saville (1979) David Rubinstein
- Nottinghamshire Labour Movement, 1880–1939 (1985) with Peter Wyncoll
- 1848: The British State and the Chartist Movement (1987)
- The Labour Movement in Britain (1988)
- The Labour Archive at the University of Hull (1989)
- The Politics of Continuity: British Foreign Policy and the Labour Government, 1945–46 (1993)
- The Consolidation of the Capitalist State, 1800–1850 (1994)
- Memoirs from the Left (2002)
