= Raphael Samuel =

British historian (1934–1996)

- Born: Raphael Elkan Samuel; 26 December 1934; London, England
- Died: 9 December 1996 (aged 61); London, England
- Education: The King Alfred School; Balliol College, Oxford
- Occupation: Historian
- Employers: Ruskin College; University of East London
- Movement: New Left
- Spouse: Alison Light (m. 1987)
- Mother: Minna Nerenstein

Raphael Elkan Samuel (26 December 1934 – 9 December 1996) was a British Marxist historian and author. Samuel helped create the History Workshop movement, and was founding editor of History Workshop Journal. He taught at Ruskin College from 1962 until the last year of his life, when he became professor at University of East London and set up a Centre for East London History.

== Life ==
Samuel was born in 1934 into a Jewish family in London. His father, Barnett Samuel, was a solicitor. His mother, Minna Nerenstein, was at various times a composer and a partner at Shapiro, Vallentine: the Jewish bookshop and publishing firm in London's East End. After his parents separated in 1941, he was raised by his mother. As a teenager, he joined the Communist Party of Great Britain. However, he left it in 1956 in the wake of Nikita Khrushchev's secret speech and the Soviet Union's invasion of Hungary.

While still a college student, Samuel became a member of the Communist Party Historians Group (CPHG), alongside E. P. Thompson, Eric Hobsbawm and several others. Samuel later studied at Balliol College, Oxford under fellow CPHG member Christopher Hill. In 1957, Samuel co-founded the magazine Universities and Left Review with Gabriel Pearson, Charles Taylor, and Stuart Hall. It would become, following its merger with The New Reasoner, the New Left Review in 1960. Samuel also established in 1958 the Partisan Coffee House, an espresso bar in Soho, London that served as a meeting place for the British New Left.

With his interest in the democratisation of history, Samuel founded the History Workshop movement at the trade union-connected Ruskin College, Oxford. This movement developed an approach, commonly called "history from below", which said that historical research and writing should emphasize the history of ordinary people and their activities. The movement flourished in Great Britain from the late 1960s to mid 1980s.

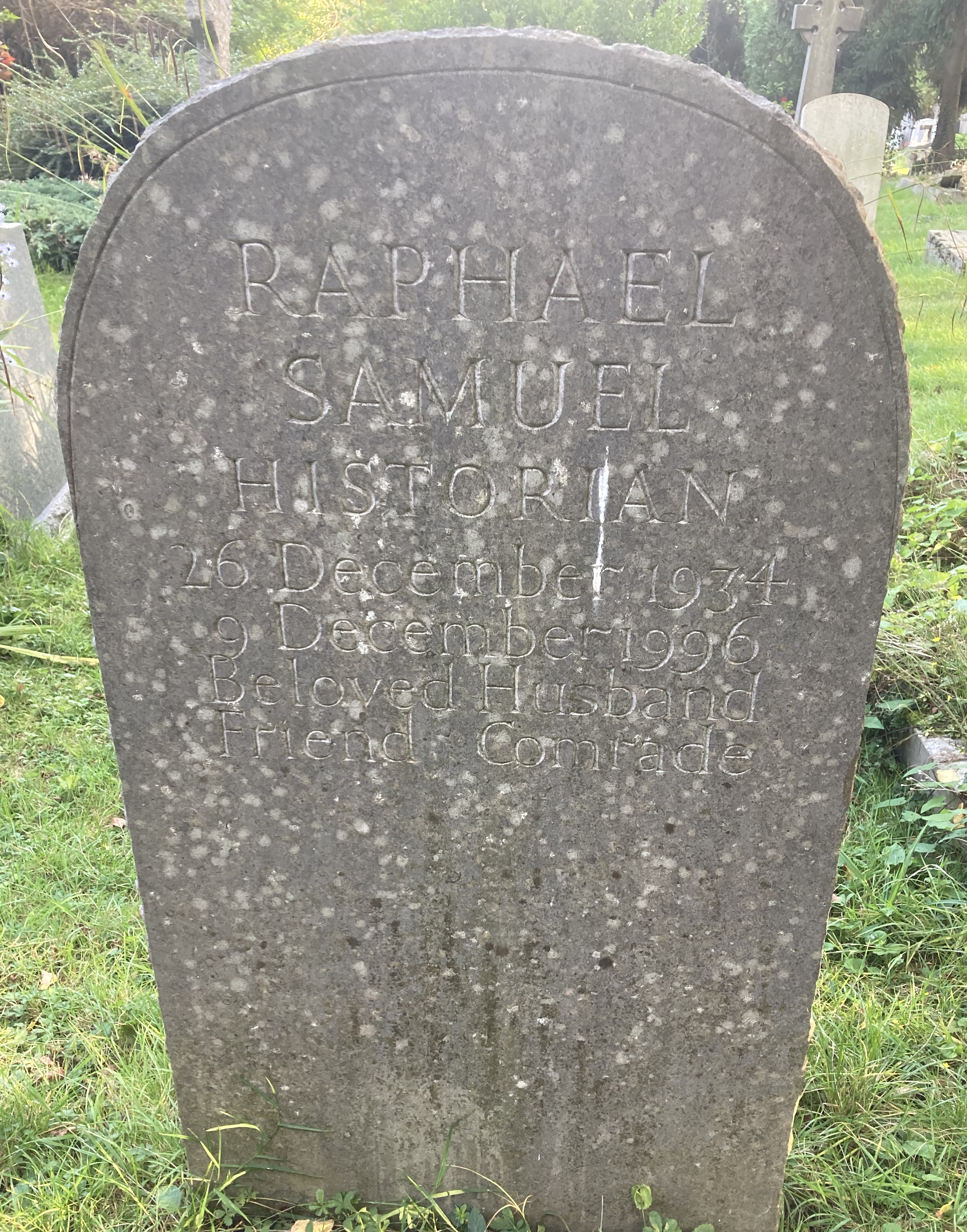
Grave of Raphael Samuel in Highgate Cemetery

In 1987, Samuel married the writer and critic Alison Light. She would later publish a memoir about their marriage entitled A Radical Romance (2019).

On 9 December 1996, Raphael Samuel died of cancer in London at age 61. He was buried on the eastern side of Highgate Cemetery.

== Legacy ==
Cultural theorist Stuart Hall described Samuel as "one of the most outstanding, original intellectuals of his generation".

After Samuel's death, the East London History Centre of the University of East London was renamed the Raphael Samuel History Centre. The Centre was established to investigate and document the history of London since the 18th century. Consistent with Samuel's belief that historical studies should extend outside the academy, the Centre encourages research in the community, and the publication of materials ranging from monographs by established scholars to student dissertations and "Notes and Queries" features in the local press. In 2009, the Centre became a partnership between the University of East London, Birkbeck College, and the Bishopsgate Institute. It is now a partnership between Birkbeck and Queen Mary University of London.

In a 1997 obituary in the journal Radical Philosophy, Carolyn Steedman assessed Samuel's contributions as a historian:

Like Raymond Williams and Edward Thompson, he produced his historical work in interaction with working-class adult returners to education.... The standard charge against the history Samuel inspired was of a fanatical empiricism and a romantic merging of historians and their subjects in crowded narratives, in which each hard-won detail of working lives, wrenched from the cold indifference of posterity, is piled upon another, in a relentless rescue of the past. When he was himself subject to these charges, it was presumably his fine – and immensely detailed – accounts of the labour process that critics had in mind. But it was meaning rather than minutiae that he cared about.

Samuel's papers are held at Bishopsgate Library.

== Selected bibliography ==
- East End Underworld (1981)
- Theatres of Memory: Volume 1: Past and Present in Contemporary Culture (1994)
- Theatres of Memory: Volume 2: Island Stories: Unravelling Britain (1997)
- The Lost World of British Communism (2006)
- Workshop of the World: Essays in People's History (2023)

Edited collections

- Village Life and Labour, edited by Raphael Samuel (1975)
- Miners, Quarrymen and Saltworkers, edited by Raphael Samuel (1977)
- People's History and Socialist Theory, edited by Raphael Samuel (1981)
- Culture, Ideology and Politics, edited by Raphael Samuel and Gareth Stedman Jones (1983)
- Theatres of the Left: 1880–1935, Raphael Samuel, Ewan MacColl and Stuart Cosgrove (1985)
- The Enemy Within: The Miners' Strike of 1984 edited by Raphael Samuel, Barbara Bloomfield and Guy Boanas (1987)
- Raphael Samuel (ed.), The Making and Unmaking of British National Identity, 3 vols (London 1989).
- Patriotism (Volume 1): History and Politics, edited by Raphael Samuel (1989)
- Patriotism (Volume 2): Minorities and Outsiders, edited by Raphael Samuel (1989)
- Patriotism (Volume 3): National Fictions, edited by Raphael Samuel (1989)
- The Myths We Live By, edited by Raphael Samuel and Paul Thompson (1990)

== Sources ==
- Boyd, Kelly, ed. (1999). "Samuel, Raphael". Encyclopedia of Historians and Historical Writing. Vol. 2. London: Fitzroy Dearborn. pp. 1047–1048. ISBN 978-1-884964-33-6.
- Thompson, Paul (Spring 1997). "Raphael Samuel 1934-96: An Appreciation". Oral History. 25 (1): 30–37. ISSN 0143-0955. JSTOR 40179442.
