= Passages from Antiquity to Feudalism =

Passages from Antiquity to Feudalism is a book written by Perry Anderson, published in 1974. The foreword introduces the book as a prelude to a larger study, Lineages of the Absolutist State. Anderson positions the work within the framework of historical materialism. He argues for a critical engagement with the writings of Marx and Engels. He suggests that Marxist inquiry must integrate non-Marxist scholarship to avoid dogmatism.

Ellen Kay Trimberger notes Anderson has no theory about "differences in the development of European states, landed classes, or capitalism." and differences are not linked to theory. According to Trimberger, Anderson "fails in his claims to link theory and history."

David James writes Anderson's formulation is convincing because "it both accounts for the diversity of feudalism across Europe and provides a plausible explanation of its development thereafter" but also notes "[s]ome may feel that Anderson neglects the economic base in his attempt to incorporate the political."
