= Ralph Miliband =

Belgian born Polish Marxist theorist (1924–1994)

- Born: Adolphe Miliband; 7 January 1924; Brussels, Belgium
- Died: 21 May 1994 (aged 70); London, England
- Citizenship: Polish (until 1948); British (from 1948)
- Political party: Labour (1951–1964)
- Spouse: Marion Kozak (m. 1961)
- Children: David Miliband; Ed Miliband

Academic background
- Education: London School of Economics
- Thesis: Popular Thought in the French Revolution, 1789–1794 (1957)
- Doctoral advisor: Harold Laski
- Influences: Karl Marx; C. Wright Mills

Academic work
- Discipline: Sociology
- Sub-discipline: Political sociology
- School or tradition: Marxism; New Left
- Institutions: London School of Economics; University of Leeds
- Doctoral students: Leo Panitch
- Notable students: Graham Allen; Celso Amorim; Chris Harman; Ralph Schoenman; Allan Segal
- Notable works: The State in Capitalist Society (1969)
- Influenced: David Coates; Bhaskar Sunkara
- Military career
- Service: Royal Navy
- Service years: 1943–1946
- Rank: Chief petty officer

Ralph Miliband (born Adolphe Miliband; 7 January 1924 – 21 May 1994) was a British sociologist. He has been described as "one of the best known academic Marxists of his generation", in this manner being compared with E. P. Thompson, Eric Hobsbawm and Perry Anderson.

Miliband was born in Belgium to working-class Polish Jewish immigrants. He fled to Britain in 1940 with his father, to avoid persecution when Nazi Germany invaded Belgium. Learning to speak English and enrolling at the London School of Economics, he became involved in left-wing politics and made a personal commitment to the cause of socialism at the grave of Karl Marx. After serving in the Royal Navy during the Second World War, he settled in London in 1946 and naturalised as a British subject in 1948.

By the 1960s, he was a prominent member of the New Left movement in Britain, which was critical of established socialist governments in the Soviet Union and Central Europe (the Eastern Bloc). He published several books on Marxist theory and the criticism of capitalism, such as Parliamentary Socialism (1961), The State in Capitalist Society (1969), and Marxism and Politics (1977), and he edited the Writings of the Left series (Jonathan Cape and Grove Press, 1972–1973).

Both of his sons, David and Ed Miliband, went on to become senior members of the Labour Party following their father's death. David was the British Foreign Secretary from 2007 to 2010. Ed was Energy Secretary from 2008 to 2010, and again from 2024 to 2026; in July 2026 he was appointed Foreign Secretary. Both contested the 2010 Labour leadership election; Ed won narrowly and served as Leader of the Opposition from 2010 to 2015, going on to serve as Foreign Secretary from 2026.

== Life and career ==
=== Early life: 1924–1940 ===
Miliband's parents grew up in the impoverished Jewish quarter of Warsaw, Poland. His father Samuel Miliband (1895–1966) was a member of the socialist Jewish Labour Bund in Warsaw.

In 1922, Miliband's parents were among the Polish Jews who migrated westward, to Brussels in Belgium, after the First World War. It was here that Miliband's parents first met, and they married in 1923. His father was a skilled craftsman who made leather goods, and his mother, Renia (or Renée, née Steinlauf 1901–1975), travelled around selling women's hats. She was embarrassed by having to work in this profession, hiding it from her neighbours, but required the extra income due to the economic troubles of the Great Depression during the 1930s. Renia spoke Polish fluently, but her husband had only had a very basic education and, as such, probably only spoke Yiddish, but he taught himself French by reading newspapers. Their son, Adolphe, was born in Brussels on 7 January 1924.

He grew up in the working-class community of Saint-Gilles, and in 1939, aged 15, he became a member of Hashomer Hatzair ("Young Guard"), a socialist-Zionist youth group. In May 1940, following the outbreak of the Second World War, the armies of Nazi Germany invaded Belgium, and the Miliband family, being Jewish, decided to flee the country from the antisemitic Nazi authorities. They missed the train to Paris and, although Adolphe – who was then sixteen – wanted to walk to the border, the family recognised that his younger sister Anna Hélène, who was only twelve, was too young for such a trek. It was decided that Renia and Anna Hélène would stay in Brussels, while Sam and Ralph would go ahead and make the journey to Paris. However, along the way Sam decided to change the plan and went with his son to Ostend, where they caught the last boat to Britain. They arrived there on 19 May 1940.

=== Early years in Britain: 1940–1959 ===
In London, Miliband abandoned the name Adolphe due to its connection with Nazi leader Adolf Hitler and instead began calling himself Ralph. He and his father gained work in the Chiswick area removing furniture from houses bombed in the Blitz and, after six weeks, were able to send news to Renia and Anne-Marie that they were in London. Discovering that the Jews of Belgium were being rounded up by the Nazis to be sent to extermination camps in the Holocaust, Renia and Anne-Marie managed to escape to a rural farm, where they were hidden by a French family until after the end of the war, when they were reunited with Sam and Ralph. However, several of Miliband's relatives and his best friend, Maurice Tan, were killed in the Holocaust.

To his dismay, the teenage Miliband came across antisemitism in London. In a diary entry made shortly after he arrived in Britain, he wrote:

The Englishman is a rabid nationalist. They are perhaps the most nationalist people in the world ... When you hear the English talk of this war you sometimes almost want them to lose it to show them how things are. They have the greatest contempt for the continent in general and for the French in particular. They didn't like the French before the defeat ... Since the defeat, they have the greatest contempt for the French Army ... England first. This slogan is taken for granted by the English people as a whole. To lose their empire would be the worst possible humiliation.

Learning to speak English, Ralph gained a place at Acton Technical College (now Brunel University) in west London with the help of the League of Nations' Commission for Refugees in January 1941. After completing his course there, he gained the help of the Belgian government in exile to study at the London School of Economics (LSE). He had become interested in Marxism and revolutionary socialism, and visited the grave of Marxism's founder Karl Marx in Highgate Cemetery in north London, to swear an oath to "the workers' cause". Meanwhile, with the constant aerial bombing of London by the Luftwaffe, the LSE was evacuated to the premises of Peterhouse, Cambridge. Harold Laski, the historian and socialist theorist, was a dominant figure in the LSE at this time. Miliband studied under Laski, and was considerably influenced by him politically.

Miliband volunteered to be sent to Belgium to assist the resistance movement, and passed his medical in January 1942, but as a Polish national he was not allowed to join until the Polish authorities gave consent. He asked Laski for help in joining the services, and shortly afterwards A. V. Alexander, First Lord of the Admiralty, wrote advising him to "go and see a vice-admiral at the Admiralty, who would fix it up". Miliband joined the Royal Navy in June 1943. He was stationed in Inverkeithing in Fife, Scotland. He served for three years in the Belgian Section of the Royal Navy, achieving the rank of chief petty officer. He served on several warships as a German speaking radio intelligence officer in the Mediterranean, tasked with intercepting German radio communications. His initial exhilaration soon wore off as months passed without seeing action, then in June 1944 he took part in supporting the Normandy landings which he wrote was "the biggest operation in history" and he "would not miss it for anything". He saw further action at the Toulon landings.

After the war, Miliband resumed his studies at the LSE in 1946, and graduated with a first-class degree in 1947. He began a doctorate on Popular Thought in the French Revolution, 1789–1794 in 1947, but did not complete his thesis until 1956. After obtaining a Leverhulme research scholarship to continue his studies at the LSE, Miliband taught at the Roosevelt College (now Roosevelt University) in Chicago. He became a naturalised British subject on 28 September 1948. In 1949 he was offered an assistant lectureship in political science at the LSE.

=== New Left: 1960–1994 ===
Miliband joined the Labour Party in 1951, and was a reluctant Bevanite in the early 1950s. He joined the British New Left, alongside the likes of E. P. Thompson and John Saville, at the New Reasoner in 1958, which became the New Left Review in 1960.

Miliband published his first book, Parliamentary Socialism, in 1961, which examined the role that the Labour Party played in British politics and society from a Marxist position, finding it wanting for a lack of radicalism. Paul Blackledge would later claim that it was "arguably Miliband's finest work". He ended his membership of the Labour Party in the mid-1960s, and subsequently remained independent of formal political affiliation. He began arguing that socialists in Britain had to start working towards building a viable alternative that would be genuinely revolutionary socialist in its positions.

He also set up the Socialist Register with Saville in 1964 and was influenced by the American sociologist C. Wright Mills, of whom he had been a friend. He published The State in Capitalist Society in 1969, a study in Marxist political sociology, rejecting the idea that pluralism spread political power, and maintaining that power in Western democracies was concentrated in the hands of a dominant class.

Miliband was passionately opposed to American involvement in the Vietnam War. In 1967 he wrote in the Socialist Register that "the US has over ... a period of years been engaged ... in the wholesale slaughter of men, women and children, the maiming of many more" and that the United States' "catalogue of horrors" against the Vietnamese people was being done "in the name of an enormous lie". In the same article, he attacked Harold Wilson for his defence of the United States' action in Vietnam, describing it as being the "most shameful chapter in the history of the Labour Party". He went on to say that the US government "made no secret of the political and diplomatic importance it attached to the unwavering support of a British Labour Government".

He left the LSE in 1972, having found himself torn by the controversies which had beleaguered the institution over the preceding few years, particularly the LSE's responses to student protests in the late 1960s. He took up the post of Professor of Politics at the University of Leeds. The time at Leeds was an unhappy period for Miliband. He suffered a heart attack soon after the move, and did not enjoy the administrative responsibilities as a head of department. He resigned in 1978, and subsequently chose to assume several posts in Canada and the USA. He took a Professorship at Brandeis University in 1977, and also lectured at other universities in North America, including York University in Toronto and the City University of New York, although he remained based in London. He published Marxism and Politics in 1977, and Capitalist Democracy in Britain in 1982. By now Miliband was active in the Socialist Society with friends such as Tariq Ali and Hilary Wainwright.

In 1985, his essay "The New Revisionism in Britain" appeared in the 25th anniversary issue of the New Left Review in which he responds to writers associated with the Marxism Today magazine such as Eric Hobsbawm and Stuart Hall. Despite their differences, Hobsbawm had been a long-standing friend of Miliband.

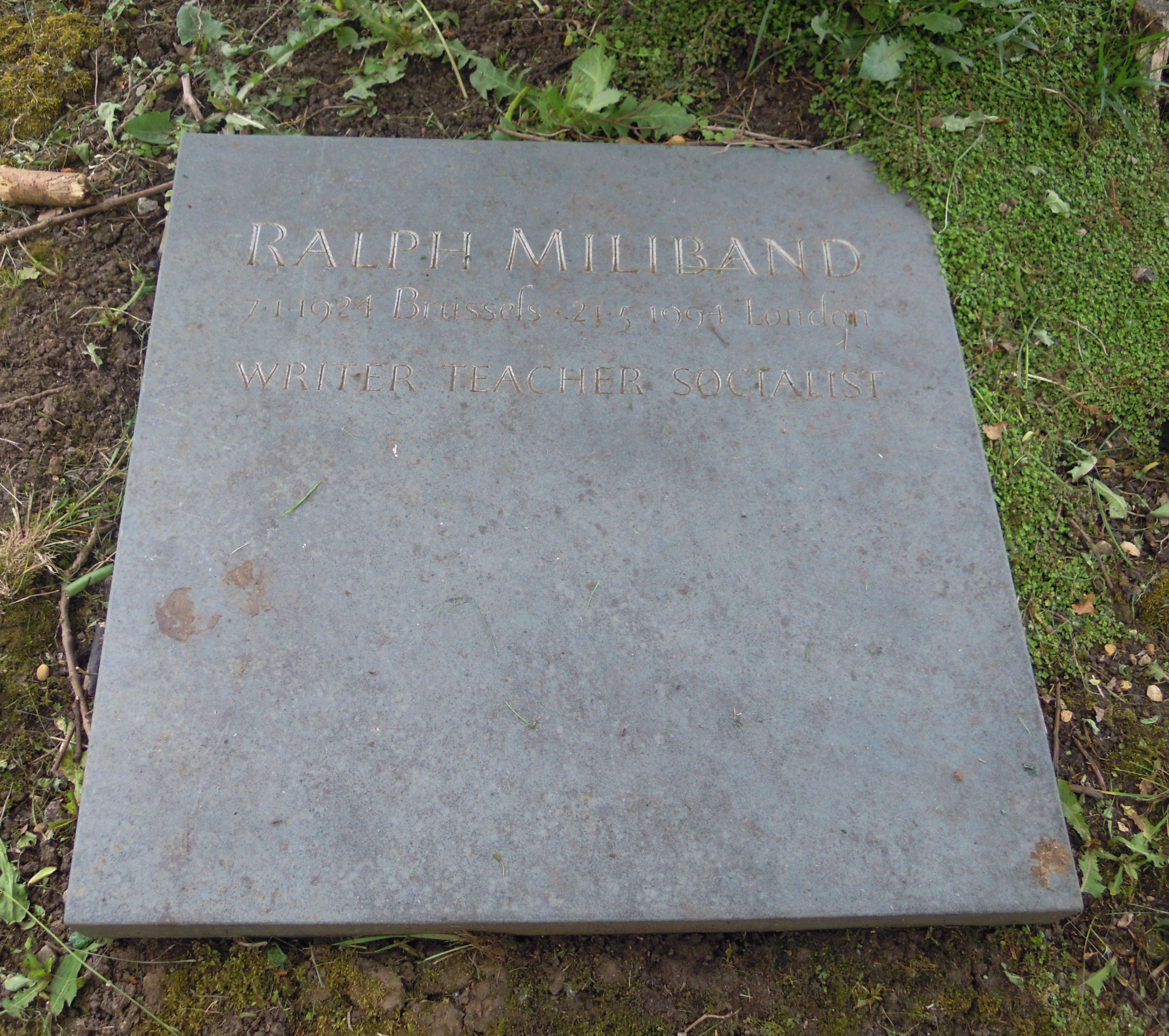
Miliband's grave in Highgate Cemetery

He suffered from cardiac problems in later life, and had a bypass operation in 1991. He died 21 May 1994. aged 70, survived by his wife and sons. He is buried in Highgate Cemetery, close to Karl Marx. His last book, Socialism for a Sceptical Age, was published in 1994, after his death.

== Personal life ==
Ralph married Polish-born Marion Kozak in September 1961. She was the daughter of a steel manufacturer, David Kozak, with a Polish Jewish heritage, and also one of his former students at the LSE. They made a home in Primrose Hill, and later in Bolton Gardens, South Kensington, and had two sons, David in 1965 and Edward in 1969.

=== David and Ed Miliband ===
His two sons both became Labour Party politicians, and in 2007 they became the first siblings to serve together as cabinet ministers since 1938. His elder son, David, was Labour MP for South Shields from 2001 to 2013. From 2005 to 2010 he served in the cabinet, latterly (from 2007) as Foreign Secretary. His younger son, Ed, was elected a Labour MP for the Doncaster North seat in 2005. From 2007 to 2008 he served as Minister for the Third Sector in the Cabinet Office and drafted Labour's manifesto for the 2010 general election. In October 2008 Ed was promoted to the position of Secretary of the newly formed Department of Energy and Climate Change (DECC). On 25 September 2010, he became the 20th leader of the Labour Party following a leadership contest in which David had also run. David would step down from politics in 2013, but Ed would later serve as Secretary of State for Energy Security and Net Zero in Keir Starmer's Cabinet, following a stint as a backbencher in the aftermath of the 2015 General Election and during the leadership of Jeremy Corbyn.Ed has served as foreign secretary since July 2026.

The journalist Andy McSmith of The Independent, in comparing the lives of Ralph, David and Ed, said that the elder figure had a "nobility and a drama" that was lacking in his sons' "steady, pragmatic political careers". On 27 September 2013, the Daily Mail published an article disputing Ralph Miliband's patriotism with the headline "The man who hated Britain". Three days later after negotiations the paper published a response by Ed Miliband describing his father's life, and saying the Daily Mail's article was character assassination. At the same time as publishing this response, the newspaper reiterated its assertion and published an editorial refusing to apologise. The Labour leader's office responded:

[Ed Miliband] wanted the Daily Mail to treat his late father's reputation fairly. Rather than acknowledge it has smeared his father, the newspaper has repeated its original claim. This simply diminishes the Daily Mail further. It will be for people to judge whether this newspaper's treatment of a war veteran, Jewish refugee from the Nazis and distinguished academic reflects the values and decency we should all expect in our political debate.

Ed Miliband's response gained support from across the political spectrum, and was endorsed by the Conservative Prime Minister David Cameron. When it was found that a Mail on Sunday reporter had intruded on the private funeral of Ed Miliband's uncle, the newspaper group's proprietor Lord Rothermere and the Sunday paper's editor apologised for this.

=== The Lipman-Miliband Trust ===
In 1974 Miliband's friend, Michael Lipman, established the Lipman Trust as a progressive funding body for socialist education. Miliband would serve as the Trust's first chair, until his death. Miliband invited both John Saville, his wife Marion, and other notable scholars, academics, and experts in socialist education, such as Hilary Wainwright and Doreen Massey to the Trust. Following Miliband's death, the Trust became the Lipman-Miliband Trust, in recognition of Miliband's many years of work.

The Trust remains an important funding body for socialist education and provides regular grants for a variety of educational projects.

== Bibliography ==
- Parliamentary Socialism: A Study of the Politics of Labour (1961). ISBN 0-85036-135-4.
- The State in Capitalist Society (1969), ISBN 0-7043-1028-7
- Marxism and Politics (Oxford: Oxford University Press, 1977), ISBN 0-85036-531-7
- Capitalist Democracy in Britain (Oxford: Oxford University Press, 1982), ISBN 0-19-827445-9
- Class Power and State Power (London: Verso, 1983) ISBN 0-86091-073-3 (cloth), 0-86091-773-8 (pbk)
- Divided Societies: Class Struggle in Contemporary Capitalism (1989)
- Socialism for a Sceptical Age (Cambridge: Polity Press, 1994) ISBN 0-7456-1426-4 (bound), 0-7456-1427-2 (pbk.)

== See also ==
- Instrumental Marxism
- Miliband–Poulantzas debate
