= David McNally (academic) =

Canadian political scientist

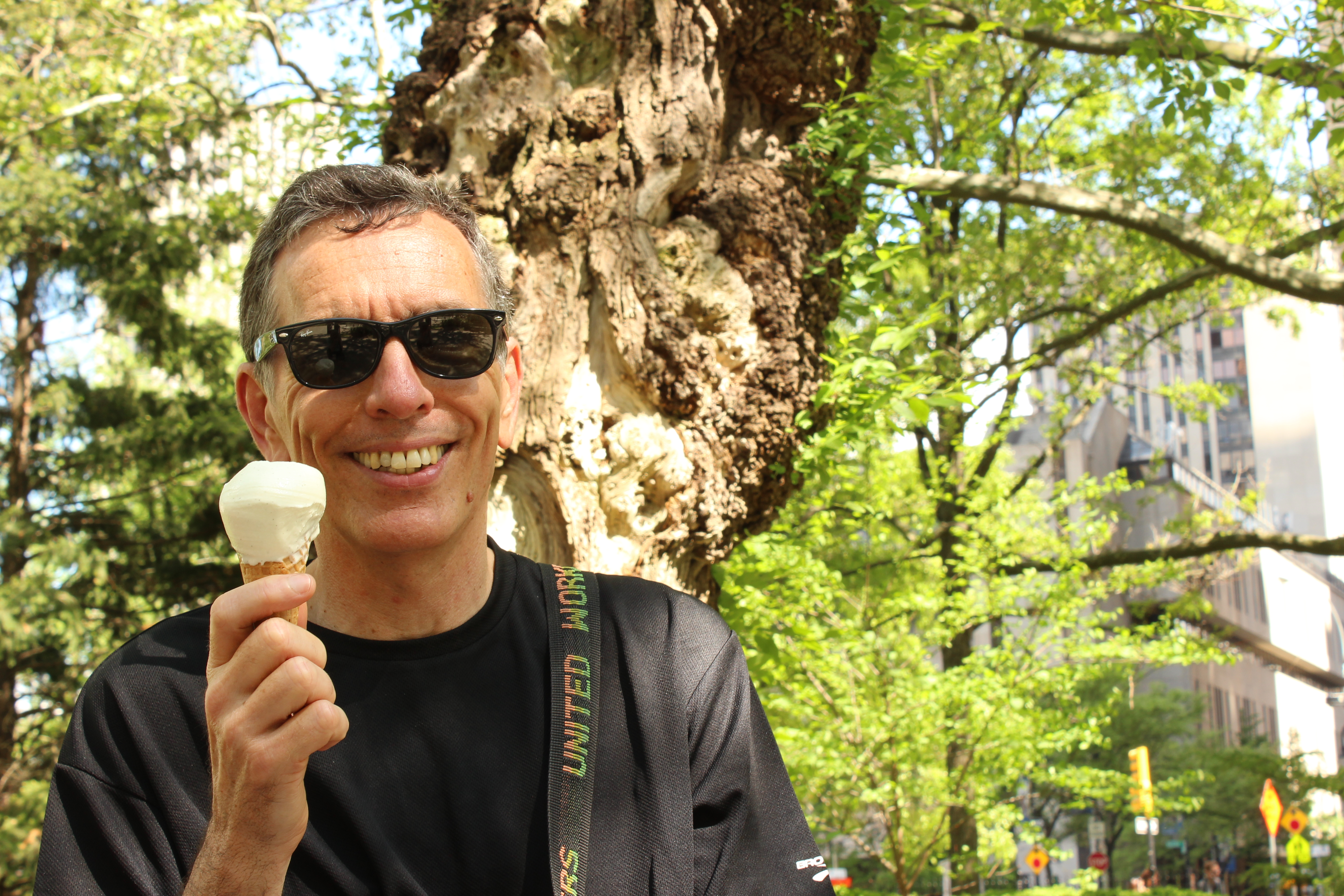
Professor David McNally

David McNally is an activist and the NEH Cullen Distinguished Professor of History and Business at the University of Houston. He was a professor of Political Science at York University in Toronto, Ontario from 1983 to 2018, and was chair of the university's Department of Political Science for several years. He is the author of many books and scholarly articles and the winner of the 2012 Deutscher Memorial Award and the 2012 Paul Sweezy Award.

He has a long history of involvement with and support for social justice movements and organizations.

== Awards ==
- 2012 Deutscher Memorial Award for Monsters of the Market: Zombies, Vampires and Global Capitalism
- 2012 Paul Sweezy Award from American Sociological Association for Global Slump: The Economics and Politics of Crisis and Resistance

== Books ==
McNally has published many books, including:

- Political Economy and the Rise of Capitalism, Berkeley: University of California Press, 1988
- Against the Market: Political Economy, Market Socialism and the Marxist Critique, London: Verso, 1993
- Bodies of Meaning: Studies on Language, Labor, and Liberation, Albany: State University of New York Press, 2000
- Another World is Possible: Globalization and Anti-Capitalism, Winnipeg: Arbeiter Ring Publishing, first edition 2001, second edition 2006. 2005
- Monsters of the Market: Zombies, Vampires and Global Capitalism, Boston: Brill, 2011/ Chicago: Haymarket, 2013. Winner of the 2012 Deutscher Memorial Award.
- Global Slump: The Economics and Politics of Crisis and Resistance, Oakland, CA: PM Press, 2010. Winner of the 2012 Paul Sweezy Award.
- Blood and Money: War, Slavery, Finance and Empire, Chicago: Haymarket Books, 2020.
- Slavery and Capitalism: A New Marxist History, Oakland, CA: University of California Press, 2025

He has contributed over 60 articles to journals such as Historical Materialism, Capital and Class, History of Political Thought, New Politics and Studies in Political Economy.

Awards
Preceded by Jairus Banaji	Deutscher Memorial Prize; 2012	Succeeded by Sam Gindin and Leo Panitch
