= Marion Kozak =

Polish-born British activist (1934–2026)

- Born: Dobra Jenta Kozak; 22 December 1934; Częstochowa, Kielce Voivodeship, Poland
- Died: 27 May 2026 (aged 91); London, England
- Education: London School of Economics
- Political party: Labour
- Movement: Jews for Justice for Palestinians; Independent Jewish Voices
- Spouse: Ralph Miliband (m. 1961; died 1994)
- Children: David and Ed

Marion Kozak Miliband (née Dobra Jenta Kozak; 22 December 1934 – 27 May 2026) was a British activist. She immigrated to the United Kingdom in the 1950s and earned a PhD in 1976. In 1961, she married Ralph Miliband (1924–1994). Their two sons, David Miliband and Ed Miliband, have risen to prominence in modern-day British politics.

== Early life and education ==
Marion Kozak was born in the Polish town of Częstochowa on 22 December 1934, the daughter of wealthy Jewish parents, Bronislawa (née Landau) and Dawid Kozak, In 1939, when the Germans took control, about 40,000, a quarter of Częstochowa's population, were Jewish. The Kozaks' factory was commandeered and transformed into a munitions plant. In the town, an estimated 2,000 Jews were murdered by Germans on the spot and another 40,000 were transported to the gas chambers at the Treblinka extermination camp. At some point, Polish nuns in a convent took the Kozaks in and hid them from the Germans. Kozak, also known as Maria, refused to reveal where or when this took place. She also credited the "kindness and generosity of acquaintances in Warsaw" with her survival. In a biography of her husband Ralph Miliband, written by a family friend, Michael Newman, he states that: "For the rest of the war Marion, Hadassa and their mother had been in constant danger and owed their lives to several brave people, Jewish and non-Jewish, many of whom were themselves killed".

In 1947, a scheme to get Jewish children out of Poland saw her, aged 12, sent alone to Britain to live with a Jewish family in north London. She remained there until she was 16, when she joined her mother and sister in Israel. However, she soon returned to the UK.

In 2009, David Miliband, in his capacity as the foreign secretary, expressed his thanks to the Polish people for having saved his mother during the Holocaust. During an official visit to Poland he said: "My mother was born here, her life was saved by those who risked theirs [by] sheltering her from Nazi oppression". Newspaper reports stated that "his paternal grandparents were also Polish Jews".

According to The Guardian, Marion Kozak had once been a student (at the London School of Economics) of the Marxist scholar Ralph Miliband. She also had a PhD in Economic and Social History from the University of Hull, where she submitted a thesis in 1976 on "Women munition workers during the First World War with special reference to engineering".

== Marriage to Ralph Miliband ==
Kozak and Ralph Miliband married in 1961. Her background and politics were similar to his, and she had a comparable, though less high-profile, career as an activist and academic. Yet she was more outgoing and had broader interests. In 1965, their son David Miliband was born. Kozak hosted relatives, left-wing writers, dissidents such as Joe Slovo of the South African Communist Party, academics from abroad, and occasionally politicians. Sons David and Ed Miliband (born 1969) were encouraged to join in.

== Political views ==
Kozak was described in London's The Jewish Chronicle as a long-standing human rights campaigner and an early activist for the Campaign for Nuclear Disarmament (in parallel with being described as keeping "a low profile" and being "a very private woman"). Described as being "a long-standing supporter of left-wing pro-Palestinian organisations", Kozak was a signatory of the founding statements of both Jews for Justice for Palestinians (founded 2002) and a supporter of Independent Jewish Voices (launched 2007). Long-time friend Tariq Ali wrote in The Guardian in 2015 that Kozak was a "strong-minded socialist and feminist".

== Influence and stance towards her sons ==
A BBC report described Kozak as a "campaigning mother" who, unlike her husband Ralph, remained loyal to the British Labour Party. However, it is thought that she was a greater influence on the political development of her sons. "There's no doubt that Ed got a lot of his drive from Marion and a lot of his feel for nitty-gritty grassroots politics from Marion too," according to Dr. Marc Stears, politics fellow at the University of Oxford. Friends stated that the contest between the brothers was a huge "strain" for their mother and that she even told people it would have been much easier had they simply become academics rather than politicians. She was reported as "maintain[ing] a low profile" in 2010 when Ed Miliband defeated David Miliband to become leader of the Opposition in the United Kingdom.

Ed Miliband admitted "my mum probably doesn't agree with me...but like most mums is too kind to say so".

== Death ==
Kozak died in London on 27 May 2026, at the age of 91.

== Publications ==
- Taking Action: Greenpeace. Heinemann Library, 1997. ISBN 978-0431027487

== See also ==
- History of the Jews in the United Kingdom
- History of the Jews in Poland
- List of Holocaust survivors
- Rescue of Jews by Poles during the Holocaust
- The Holocaust in Poland
