= The Lost World of British Communism =

- Author: Raphael Samuel
- Language: English
- Publisher: Verso Books
- Publication date: 2006
- Pages: 244
- ISBN: 9781844671038
- OCLC: 71239437

The Lost World of British Communism is a book by Raphael Samuel first published, posthumously, in 2006 by Verso Books.

== Content ==
The book is composed of a series of essays that were collected together to mark the ten year anniversary of Samuel's death in 1996. They describe the development of the Communist Party of Great Britain in the 1940s and the experience of being a member of it from the vantage point of the 1980s. All of the three essays in the work were published by the New Left Review between 1984 and 1987.

The book engages with a number of different aspects of Communism in Britain, for example the way in which the party was organised on a top-down basis that was founded upon direction by the Comintern and that had elements of the Leninist idea of a 'vanguard party' centred on a small group of professional revolutionaries.

The book also examines the state of left-wing politics in the UK in the challenging environment of the Thatcherite 1980s and, in the case of the British Communist party of the time, the way in which it was divided between an 'old guard' faction and the younger forces aligned around Marxism Today at the time. Samuel himself had left the organisation thirty years earlier. One of his overall assessments of the movement was that it embodied a "doomed, flawed but noble faith".
