= Socialist Register =

Annual publication (founded 1964)

- Discipline: Socialism
- Language: English
- Edited by: Various

Publication details
- History: 1964–present
- Publisher: Merlin Press Ltd. (United Kingdom)
- Frequency: Annual

Standard abbreviations
- ISO 4: Social. Regist.

Indexing
- ISSN: 0081-0606
- LCCN: 79617481
- OCLC no.: 768186008

Links
- Journal homepage; Online access; Online archive

The Socialist Register is an annual socialist publication. It was founded in 1964 by Ralph Miliband and John Saville. They had criticisms of the New Left Review (NLR) after Perry Anderson became editor of the NLR in 1962. Miliband and Saville sought to bring about a journal in the orientation of The New Reasoner.

The Socialist Register is published in the US by Monthly Review Press, in Canada by Fernwood Publishing, and in the UK and rest of the world by Merlin Press. Its name is a reference to the Political Register, a 19th-century newspaper founded by radical journalist William Cobbett.
