= The New Old World =

2009 book by Perry Anderson

- Author: Perry Anderson
- Publisher: Verso Books
- Publication date: United Kingdom; 2009
- Pages: 592pp.
- ISBN: 1844678067

The New Old World is a 2009 book by Perry Anderson.

== Content ==
The focus of the book is upon the history of the European Union from its inception to the present day, taking into account the question of ever larger European expansion and the possibility of the project extending into Asia. Anderson sees the European Union as "the last great world-historical achievement of the bourgeoisie". The work is founded upon essays years after they were originally written, and includes portraits of particular individuals who were central to the process of European integration such as Jean Monnet who is described as being "an international adventurer on a grand scale".

It examines the core countries that lay at the heart of the European project in its early period and analyses the political and cultural developments of the primary countries that formed the Common Market, i.e. France, Italy and Germany.

It then discusses the question of the relationship between Cyprus and Turkey and how that has posed challenges to the success of European integration, including the wider vexed question of whether Europe and the EU should be contiguous.

Anderson excludes a discussion of his own country, the United Kingdom, arguing that its "history since the fall of Thatcher has been of little moment."

The book concludes with a section discussing the nascence and progression of the idea of European unification from the Enlightenment Period onwards and how those concepts affect the future trajectory of the EU.

Anderson is critical of the way that the EU has developed, but in terms that vary radically from the oft-repeated grievances that it is over-centralised or overly bureaucratic, declaring instead that "Today's EU, with its pinched spending (just over 1% of GDP), minuscule bureaucracy (around 16,000 officials, excluding translators), absence of independent taxation, and lack of any means of administrative enforcement, could in many ways be regarded as . . . a minimal state, beyond the most drastic imaginings of classical liberalism."

He also agrees with the general perspective of Alan Milward that the European project has been essentially driven by the logic of the nation-state, with rhetoric about federalism or post-nationalism being limited to language rather than reality. In addition he praises the work of Christopher Caldwell and Robert Kagan, despite coming from a different political ideology from their conservative one.
