= David Coates (political economist) =

British-American political economist (1946–2018)

- Born: 24 December 1946; Tottington, Lancashire, England
- Died: 7 July 2018 (aged 71)
- Spouses: Dorothy Parry (div.); Joan Butterfield (div.); Eileen McKenna (m. 1991)

Academic background
- Education: University of York; Nuffield College, Oxford
- Influences: Ralph Miliband

Academic work
- Discipline: Political science
- Sub-discipline: Political economy
- Institutions: University of York; University of Leeds; University of Manchester; Wake Forest University
- Website: davidcoates.net

David Coates (24 December 1946 – 7 August 2018) was a British-American political economist.

Coates earned an undergraduate degree at the University of York in 1967 and completed a Doctor of Philosophy degree at the University of Oxford in 1979. He began teaching prior to earning an advanced degree, serving as lecturer at the University of York from 1970 to 1971, and moving to the University of Leeds in 1977. Coates left Leeds in 1995 for the University of Manchester, and became the Worrell Chair in Anglo-American Studies at Wake Forest University in 1999. He died on 7 August 2018, aged 71.

== Selected bibliography ==
- The Labour Party and the Struggle for Socialism, Cambridge University Press, 1975.
- Labour in Power?: A Study of the Labour Government 1974-1979, Prentice Hall, 1980.
- A Socialist Anatomy of Britain, Polity Press, 1985.
- The Crisis of Labour: Industrial Relations and the State in Modern Britain, Philip Allan, 1989.
- The Question of UK Decline: The Economy, State and Society, Harvester-Wheatsheaf, 1993.
- Industrial Policy in Britain, Macmillan, 1996.
- Models of Capitalism: Growth and Stagnation in the Modern Era, Polity Press, 2000.
- New Labour in Power, Manchester University Press, 2000.
- Blair’s War, Polity Press, 2004.
- Prolonged Labour: The Slow Birth of New Labour in Britain, Palgrave Macmillan, 2005.
- Answering Back: Liberal Responses to Conservative Arguments, Continuum, 2010.
- Making the Progressive Case: Towards a Stronger US Economy, Continuum, 2011.
- America in the Shadow of Empires, Palgrave Macmillan, 2014.
- Capitalism: The Basics Routledge, 2015.
- Observing Obama in Real Time Volume 1: Pursuing the Progressive Case, Library Partners Press, 2016.
- Observing Obama in Real Time Volume 2: The Progressive Case Stalled, Library Partners Press, 2016.
- Reflections on the Future of the Left, Agenda Publishing, 2017.
- Flawed Capitalism: The Anglo-American Condition and its Resolution, Agenda Publishing, 2018.
