= Leo Panitch =

Canadian Marxist academic (1945–2020)

Leo Panitch FRSC
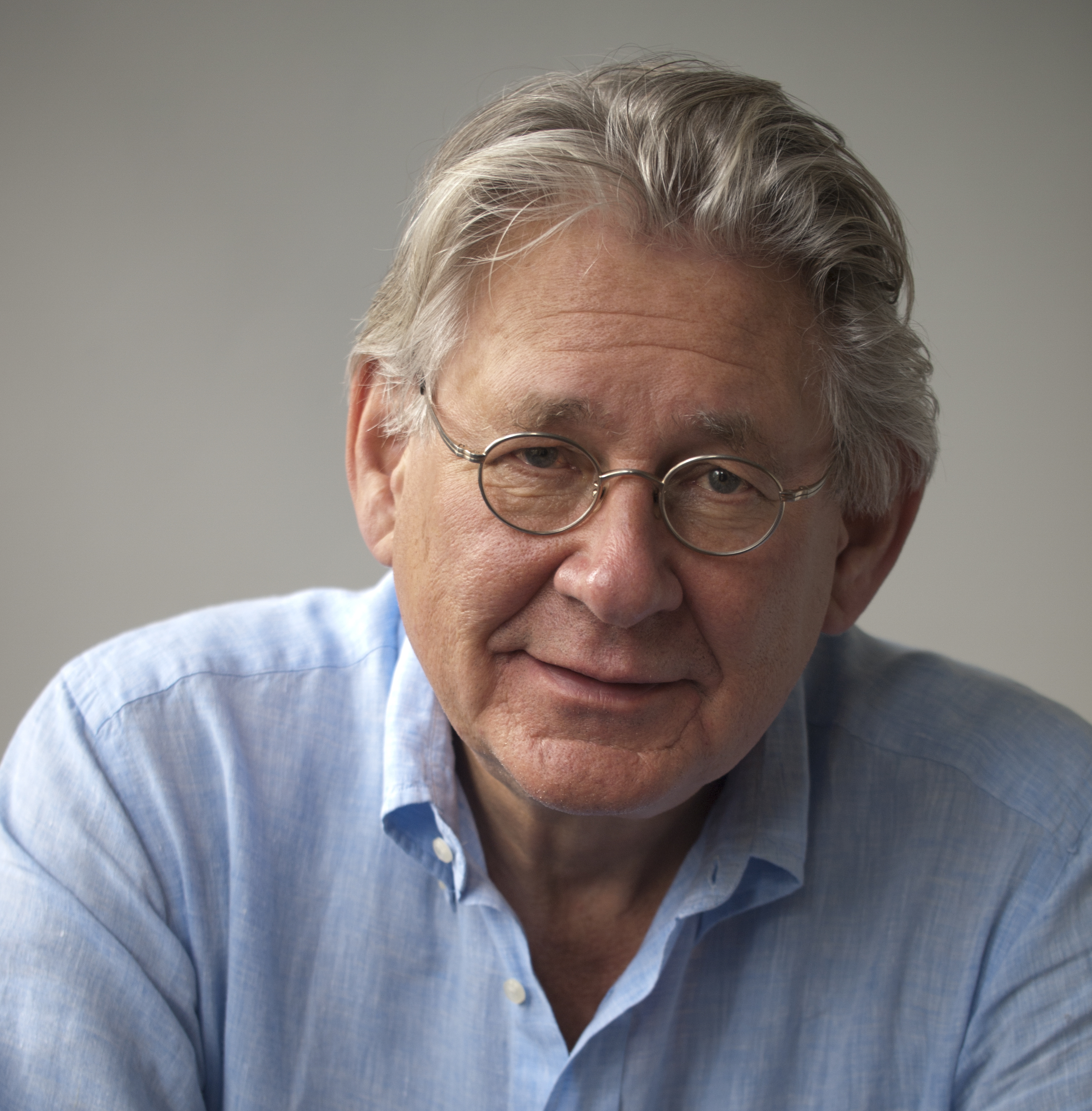
- Panitch in 2012
- Born: Leo Victor Panitch; 3 May 1945; Winnipeg, Manitoba, Canada
- Died: 19 December 2020 (aged 75); Toronto, Ontario, Canada
- Known for: The Socialist Register (co-editor)
- Spouse: Melanie Panitch (m. 1967)
- Children: 2

Academic background
- Education: University of Manitoba; London School of Economics
- Thesis: The Labour Party and the Trade Unions (1973)
- Doctoral advisor: Ralph Miliband
- Influences: Karl Marx, Ralph Miliband, Nicos Poulantzas

Academic work
- Discipline: Political science
- Sub-discipline: Political economy; political theory
- School or tradition: Marxism
- Institutions: Carleton University; York University
- Main interests: British and Canadian labour history; global capitalism; socialism
- Notable works: The Making of Global Capitalism (2012)
- Influenced: Bhaskar Sunkara

Leo Victor Panitch FRSC (3 May 1945 – 19 December 2020) was a Canadian research professor of political science and a Canada Research Chair in comparative political economy at York University. From 1985 until the 2021 edition, he served as co-editor of the Socialist Register, which describes itself as "an annual survey of movements and ideas from the standpoint of the independent new left". Panitch himself saw the Register as playing a major role in developing Marxism's conceptual framework for advancing a democratic, co-operative and egalitarian socialist alternative to capitalist competition, exploitation, and insecurity.

Since his appointment as a Canada Research Chair in 2002, Panitch focused his academic research and writing on the spread of global capitalism. He argued that this process of globalization is being led by the American state through agencies such as the US Department of the Treasury and the Federal Reserve. Panitch saw globalization as a form of imperialism but argued that the American Empire is an informal one in which the US sets rules for trade and investment in partnership with other sovereign but less powerful capitalist states. His book The Making of Global Capitalism: The Political Economy of American Empire (2012), written with his close friend and university colleague Sam Gindin, traces the development of American-led globalization over more than a century. In 2013, the book was awarded the Deutscher Memorial Prize in the United Kingdom for best and most creative work in or about the Marxist tradition and in 2014 it won the Rik Davidson/SPE Book Prize for the best book in political economy by a Canadian.

Panitch was the author of more than 100 scholarly articles and nine books including Working-Class Politics in Crisis: Essays on Labour and the State (1986), The End of Parliamentary Socialism: From New Left to New Labour (2001), and Renewing Socialism: Transforming Democracy, Strategy and Imagination (2008) in which he argued that capitalism is inherently unjust and undemocratic.

== Early life and education ==
Panitch was born on 3 May 1945, in Winnipeg, Manitoba, Canada. He grew up in Winnipeg's North End, a working-class neighbourhood that, as he observed decades later, produced "many people of a radical left political disposition". His parents were Ukrainian Jewish immigrants. His father, Max Panitch, was born in the southern Ukraine town of Uscihtsa, but remained behind in Bucharest, Romania, with a fervently religious uncle when his family emigrated to Winnipeg in 1912. He was reunited with them in 1922 and by that time was well on his way to becoming a socialist and a supporter of Labor Zionism. As a sewer and cutter of fur coats (an 'aristocrat of the needle trade'), he was active in the Winnipeg labour movement and the Manitoba CCF and its successor, the New Democratic Party of Manitoba (NDP). Panitch's mother, Sarah, was an orphan from Rivne in central Ukraine who had come to Winnipeg in 1921 at the age of 13 accompanied only by her older sister, Rose. Max and Sarah married in 1930. Panitch's older brother Hersh was born in 1934.

Panitch attended a secular Jewish school named after the radical Polish-Yiddish writer I. L. Peretz. During a conference on Jewish radicalism in Winnipeg held in 2001, Panitch said the school grew out of the socialist fraternal mutual aid societies that Jewish immigrants had established. These included the Arbeiter Ring also known as the Workmen's Circle. Panitch told the conference that its first declaration of principles, adopted in 1901, began with the words: "The spirit of the Workmen's Circle is freedom of thought and endeavour towards solidarity of the workers, faithfulness to the interests of its class in the struggle against oppression and exploitation." He added: "As such institutions multiplied and spread through the Jewish community, for a great many people and for a considerable number of decades to come, to be Jewish, especially in a city like Winnipeg, came to mean to be radical."

Panitch received a Bachelor of Arts degree in economics and political science in 1967 from the University of Manitoba. During his undergraduate years, he realized how much the writings of Karl Marx and the evolution of historical materialism helped him understand capitalism and its relation to the state. One of his teachers, Cy Gonick, introduced him to ideas about industrial democracy in which workers would control and manage their own workplaces. The 1960s generation of the New Left, Panitch writes, was impelled towards socialism by "our experience with and observation of the inequalities, irrationalities, intolerances and hierarchies of our own capitalist societies."

At age 22, Panitch left Winnipeg and moved to London, England, where he earned a Master of Science degree in 1968 at the London School of Economics (LSE) and a Doctor of Philosophy degree from LSE in 1974. His doctoral thesis was entitled The Labour Party and the Trade Unions. It was published as Social Democracy and Industrial Militancy in 1976 by Cambridge University Press. British sociologist Ralph Miliband was his Thesis advisor.

== Academic work, writing and activism ==
Panitch taught at Carleton University between 1972 and 1984, was a Professor of Political Science at York University from 1984, and served as Carleton Chair of the Department of Political Science from 1988 to 1994. In 2002, he was appointed Canada Research Chair in Comparative Political Economy at York. The appointment was renewed in 2009. His research involved examining the role of the American state and multinational corporations in the evolution of global capitalism.

After his text The Canadian State: Political Economy and Political Power was published in 1977 by the University of Toronto Press, Panitch became the General Co-editor of its State and Economic Life book series in 1979, serving in that role until 1995. He also co-founded the Canadian academic journal Studies in Political Economy in 1979 and played a role in establishing Carleton's Institute for Political Economy in the 1980s. He was politically active in the Movement for an Independent Socialist Canada and the Ottawa Committee for Labour Action, the two main organizational successors to The Waffle after it was expelled from the NDP in the early 1970s. In the 1980s, he was a regular columnist ("Panitch on Politics") for the independent socialist magazine, Canadian Dimension, and remained active in socialist political circles, in particular the Socialist Project in Toronto. He was inducted as an Academic Fellow of the Royal Society of Canada in 1995, and was also a member of the Marxist Institute and the Committee on Socialist Studies as well as the Canadian Political Science Association.

In addition to the 33 annual volumes of the Socialist Register he edited from 1985, he was the author of over 100 scholarly articles and nine books, including From Consent to Coercion: The Assault on Trade Union Freedoms; A Different Kind of State: Popular Power and Democratic Administration; The End of Parliamentary Socialism: From New Left to New Labour; American Empire and the Political Economy of Global Finance; and In and Out of Crisis: The Global Financial Meltdown and Left Alternatives. Panitch saw the Register as a crucial link between the politics of the New Left and those of Ralph Miliband, his mentor and the 1964 founder of the journal. As editor, Panitch strove to produce works that were at once easily readable in prose and difficult to digest in content.

At the "Globalization, Justice and Democracy" symposium at Delhi University on 11 November 2010), Panitch drew on his book In and Out of Crisis (with Greg Albo and Sam Gindin). The book and symposium argued that the left's lack of ambition during the global economic crisis was more debilitating than its lack of capacity. He outlined immediate reforms that could lead to fundamental changes in class relations, including nationalizing banks to turn them into public utilities; demanding universal public pensions to replace private, employer-sponsored ones; and free health care, education and public transit to escape capitalism's drive to turn public needs into marketable, profit-generating commodities.

== Making of global capitalism ==
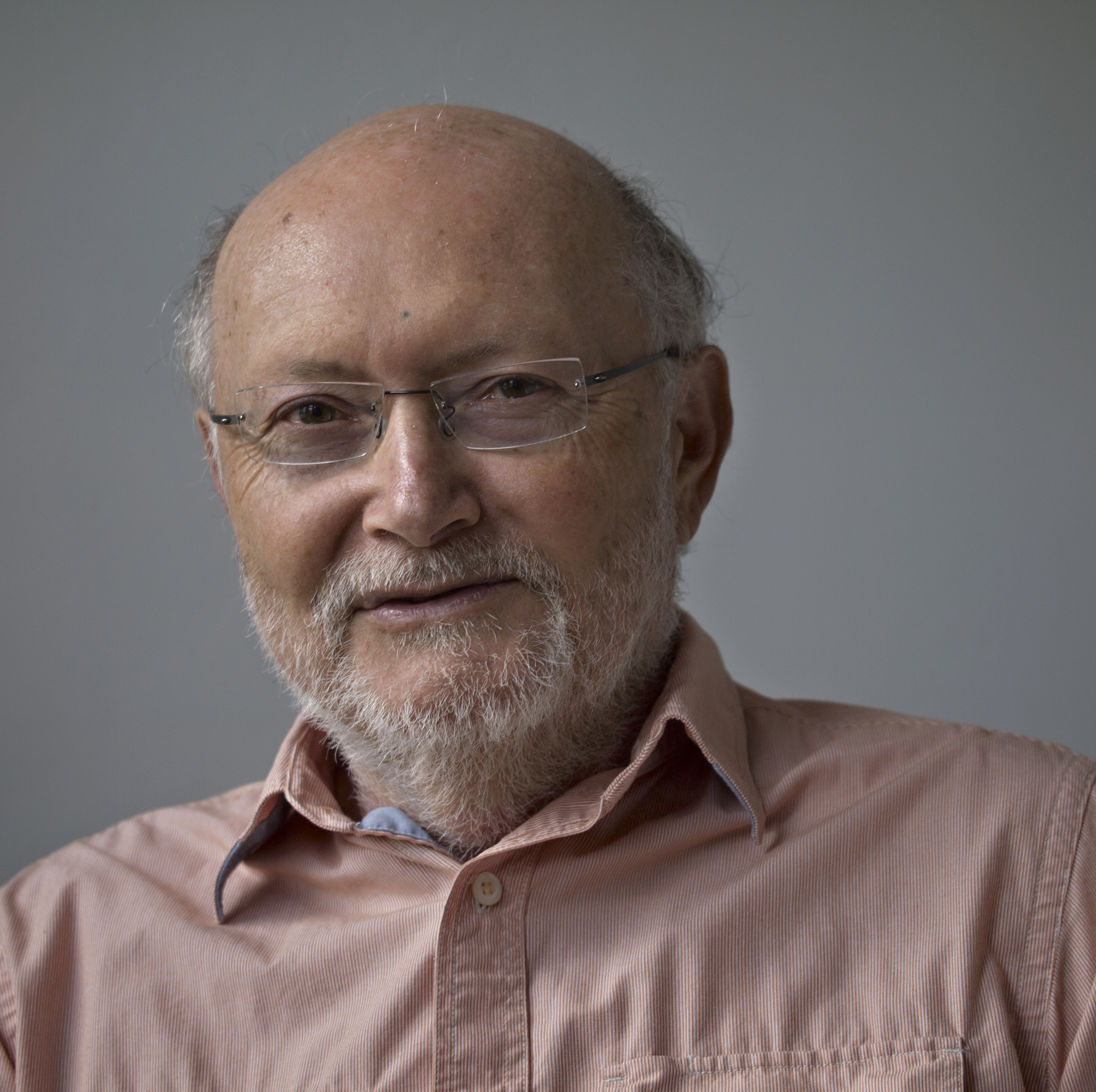
Sam Gindin

In 2012, Panitch, with his friend and colleague Sam Gindin, published The Making of Global Capitalism: The Political Economy of American Empire (2012). As its title suggests, the 456-page book is a comprehensive study of the growth of a global capitalist system over more than a century. Panitch and Gindin argue that the process known as globalization was not an inevitable outcome of expansionary capitalism but was consciously planned and managed by the US, the world's most powerful state. They dispute the idea that globalization was driven by multinational corporations that have become more powerful than nation states. For them, this claim ignores the intricate relationships between states and capitalism; for example, states maintain property rights, oversee contracts, and sign free trade agreements, while deriving tax revenues and popular legitimacy from the success of capitalist enterprises within their borders.

Panitch and Gindin dismiss claims that the American Empire is in decline as shown, for example, by US trade deficits, industrial shutdowns, and layoffs. They argue that in fact the opposite is true. In recent decades, American firms "restructured key production processes, outsourced others to cheaper and more specialized suppliers and relocated to the US south – all as part of an accelerated general reallocation of capital within the American economy." They write that although it is always highly volatile, the robust and globally dominant US financial system facilitated this economic restructuring while making pools of venture capital available for investment in new, high-tech firms. As a result, the US share of global production remained stable at around one quarter of the total right into the 21st century.

=== American-led global capitalism ===
According to Panitch and Gindin, the institutional foundations for American-led global capitalism were laid during the Great Depression of the 1930s when the Roosevelt administration strengthened the US Federal Reserve and the US Treasury while establishing a wide range of economic and financial regulatory agencies. Moreover, US entry into the Second World War led to the growth of a permanent American military–industrial complex. The authors argue that these state financial and military institutions made the US into a Great Power capable of superintending the spread of its own brand of capitalism. The US also dominated post-war global institutions such as the International Monetary Fund and the World Bank, while the American dollar, backed by US Treasury bonds, became the anchor for international finance. Panitch and Gindin write that the Marshall Plan, the American-financed post-war rebuilding of Europe and Japan, "through low-interest loans, direct grants, technological assistance, and favourable trading relations", created the conditions for investment by US multinational corporations and eventually for substantial foreign investment in the US.

=== America's informal empire ===
As they trace the history of global capitalism, Panitch and Gindin write that in the years after the Second World War, the US succeeded in building an "informal empire" integrating other capitalist states into a co-ordinated, global capitalist system:

The US informal empire constituted a distinctly new form of political rule. Instead of aiming for territorial expansion along the lines of the old empires, US military interventions were primarily aimed at preventing the closure of particular places or whole regions of the globe to capital accumulation. This was part of a larger remit of creating openings for or removing barriers to capital in general, not just US capital. The maintenance and indeed steady growth of US military installations around the globe after World War II, mostly on the territory of independent states, needs to be seen in this light rather than in terms of securing territorial space for the exclusive US use of natural resources and accumulation by its corporations.

Although the US dominates in this informal, imperial system, Panitch and Gindin argue that other advanced capitalist states maintain their sovereignty, but must defer to American wishes when it comes to military interventions abroad. They write: "The American state arrogated to itself the sole right to intervene against other sovereign states (which it repeatedly did around the world), and largely reserved to its own discretion the interpretation of international rules and norms."

=== From golden age to crisis ===
The book chronicles the "golden age" of capitalism during the 1950s and 1960s when capitalists enjoyed high profits in a booming, full-employment American economy. Workers benefited too from improved social programs and the higher wages that labour unions fought for and won. As the authors point out, capitalism is prone to crisis, and the 1970s produced "stagflation", simultaneously high rates of inflation and unemployment, stagnant economies, and declining profits. In 1979, Paul Volcker, the then Chairman of the Federal Reserve, found a way out of the crisis by administering the "Volcker shock", double-digit interest rates. The deep recession that followed brought high unemployment and a decline over time of labour militancy. The adoption of neoliberal policies during the 1980s that restricted workers' rights to organize and to strike made it possible for capitalists to "discipline" workers by demanding greater "flexibility" in hours and working conditions and by holding down wages. Neoliberalism also led to an array of free trade agreements that promoted worldwide corporate investment and production. According to Panitch and Gindin, the neoliberal era ushered in a second, highly-profitable "golden age" but this time only for the capitalist class, not for workers whose wages stagnated while union membership declined.

=== 2008 financial crisis ===
The final chapter in The Making of Global Capitalism is devoted to a detailed examination of the 2008 financial crisis, bringing an end to high corporate profits as millions lost their homes and consumer spending fell. Panitch and Gindin write that the crisis was preceded by decades of growth in volatile financial markets that had become crucial to underwriting capitalist expansion. They argue that the US encouraged the growth in financial markets with its accompanying risk-taking even though it was periodically required "to put out financial conflagrations" such as the 1997 Asian financial crisis. The 2008 financial crisis was not regional but global. As they write:

The roots of the crisis, in fact, lay in the growing global importance of US mortgage finance – a development which could not be understood apart from the expanded state support for home ownership, a long-standing element in the integration of workers into US capitalism. Since the 1980s, wages had stagnated and social programs had been eroded, reinforcing workers' dependence on the rising value of their homes as a source of economic security. The decisive role of American state agencies in encouraging the development of mortgage-backed securities figured prominently in their spread throughout global financial markets. The close linkages between these markets and the American state were thus crucial both to the making of the US housing bubble and to its profound global impact when it burst, as mortgage-backed securities became difficult to value and to sell, thus freezing the world's financial markets.

Panitch and Gindin add that the collapse of housing prices led to a sharp decline in US consumer spending because housing represented a main source of workers' wealth. They wrote: "The bursting of the housing bubble thus had much greater effects than had the earlier bursting of the stock-market bubble at the turn of the century, and much greater implications for global capitalism in terms of the role the US played as 'consumer of last resort'." As manager-in-chief of the global capitalist system, the authors note that the U.S. once again came to the rescue with billions of dollars in bail-out money for domestic and foreign banks.

=== Reviews ===
The Making of Global Capitalism has been the subject of a wide range of commentary. In Panitch's newspaper obituary, his friend and journalist Robert Collison was quoted as saying: "Global Capitalism will be Leo's seminal achievement because it really does address directly the major issue facing Western democracies: the relative impoverishment of the working and lower-middle classes because of globalization and neoliberal and corporatist policies that have been embraced, ironically, by much of the social democratic left-leaning parties in the West."

Writing in the Marxist journal Science & Society, Canadian sociologist J. Z. Garrod questions the validity of Panitch and Gindin's theory of informal American Empire. While he acknowledges the "American state's role in constructing global capitalism", Garrod argues that Panitch and Gindin neglect wider transformations in the nature of global capital and labour, and "that such changes will also affect and redefine the role of the nation-state". For example, he cites a column by journalist George Monbiot, who writes that dispute resolution tribunals established under international trade treaties give transnational corporations the right to challenge restrictions imposed by legislatures and courts at secret hearings where corporate lawyers serve as judges. Garrod argues that such treaties transform, reframe, and alter conceptual categories such as national political spaces, modes of production, and property relations. He writes: "Given that these [trade] agreements fundamentally alter the material foundations of the American state as well, I am not convinced that it is possible to consider them evidence of an informal American empire — indeed, I find them evidence of a much greater terror: the consolidation of the global market, the rise of private forms of public authority, and the total commodification of social life."

Martijn Konings, professor of political economy and social theory at the University of Sydney, points to what he terms the "key conceptual contribution" of Panitch's work in The Making of Global Capitalism, namely "the understanding of the role of money, finance, and credit in capitalist life and how this relates to questions of social transformation". At the same time, Konings notes that Panitch rejected much of "value theory, a label that refers to Marxist debates about what determines the value of commodities and other objects traded on markets, and in particular, what the role of labour is in this process." Although he acknowledges that for him value theory "never stopped nagging at me", Konings also felt "there was something uniquely compelling about Leo's more political perspective on globalization and empire." His essay in honour of Panitch describes the evolution of his own thinking on the development of a capitalist economy in which increasingly indebted households generate income from precarious employment constantly choosing from a menu of least-bad options, yet nonetheless becoming emotionally invested "in the provocative logic of capital". Konings suggests that in emphasizing the vitality of money, finance, and credit in capitalism, Panitch points the way for labour to organize resistance against "our receptiveness to the promises of capital".

In a memorial tribute, Panitch's York University colleague Reg Whitaker writes that the Making of Global Capitalism represented the "capstone" of his "academic achievements" written in collaboration with his "intellectual comrade" Sam Gindin. Whitaker notes that the book "involved a rethinking of American history, showing how, for instance, the New Deal represented a crucial development of state capacity that by the late 1930s permitted a 'Grand Truce' with capital, which in turn led through war and postwar to an 'internationalization of the New Deal' in a new global order of 'informal' American Empire." As the book points out, that new global order was shaken by the 2008 financial crisis, requiring emergency action by the Obama administration to rescue the system. Whitaker notes that Panitch and Gindin contrast the 21st century capitalist crisis with the Great Depression of the 1930s, which led to competition and rivalry between nation states, the spread of fascism, and another world war. Instead of conflict between states, the latest economic crisis led to internal conflicts within them, as evidenced for example by an anti-globalization movement that began with the conflict in Chiapas and continued with such protests as Occupy Wall Street. Whitaker writes that Panitch and Gindin end their book with a look at the renewed opportunities this movement brings for democratic socialism: "That fault lines of global capitalism now run within states rather than between states holds considerable political significance for the renewed possibilities for radical politics."

== Personal life ==
Panitch married Melanie Pollock of Winnipeg in 1967. She is a longtime activist and human rights advocate who teaches in the School of Disability Studies at Toronto Metropolitan University. In 2006, she earned a doctorate in social welfare from the City University of New York. Her thesis, on the history of the Canadian Association for Community Living, focused on mothers' campaigns to close institutions and gain human rights for disabled Canadians. In 2007, it was published as Disability, Mothers and Organization: Accidental Activists.

The Panitches had two children. Maxim is a photographer, writer, and Scrabble champion, while Vida is a philosophy professor at Carleton University in Ottawa, Ontario. Panitch spoke three languages: English, French, and Yiddish. He and his wife lived in Toronto, Ontario. Panitch died on 19 December 2020, of viral pneumonia associated with COVID-19 amid the COVID-19 pandemic in Ontario, which he contracted in hospital while receiving treatment for multiple myeloma.

== Works ==
=== Books ===
- Searching for Socialism: The Project of the Labour New Left from Benn to Corbyn (co-authored with Colin Leys), Verso: 2020
- The Socialist Challenge Today (new expanded edition) (co-authored with Sam Gindin and Steve Maher), Merlin Press: 2020
- The Making of Global Capitalism: The Political Economy of American Empire (co-authored with Sam Gindin), Verso: 2012
- In and Out of Crisis: The Global Financial Meltdown and Left Alternatives (co-authored with Greg Albo and Sam Gindin), PM Press: 2010
- Renewing Socialism: Transforming Democracy, Strategy and Imagination, Merlin Press: 2008
- From Consent to Coercion: The Assault on Trade Union Freedoms (co-authored with Donald Swartz), University of Toronto Press: 2003
- The End of Parliamentary Socialism: From New Left to New Labour (2nd edition) (co-authored with Colin Leys), Verso: 2001
- Working Class Politics in Crisis: Essays on Labour and the State, Verso: 1986
- The Canadian State: Political Economy and Political Power (editor), University of Toronto Press: 1977

=== Articles ===
- Superintending Global Capital (co-authored with Sam Gindin), New Left Review 35, 2005
- Global Capitalism and American Empire (co-authored with Sam Gindin), Socialist Register 40, 2004
- The New Imperial State, New Left Review 2, 2000
- The Impoverishment of State Theory, Socialism and Democracy 13, no. 2, 1999
- Globalisation and the State, Socialist Register 30, 1994
- Trade Unions and the Capitalist State, New Left Review 125, 1981
- Dependency and Class in Canadian Political Economy, Studies in Political Economy 6, no. 1, 1981
- Recent Theorizations of Corporatism: Reflections on a Growth Industry, The British Journal of Sociology 31, no. 2, 1980
- The Development of Corporatism in Liberal Democracies, Comparative Political Studies 10, no. 1, 1977
- Various articles and videos

Awards
Preceded by David McNally	Deutscher Memorial Prize; 2013; With: Sam Gindin	Succeeded by Roland Boer
