= Sam Gindin =

Canadian intellectual and activist

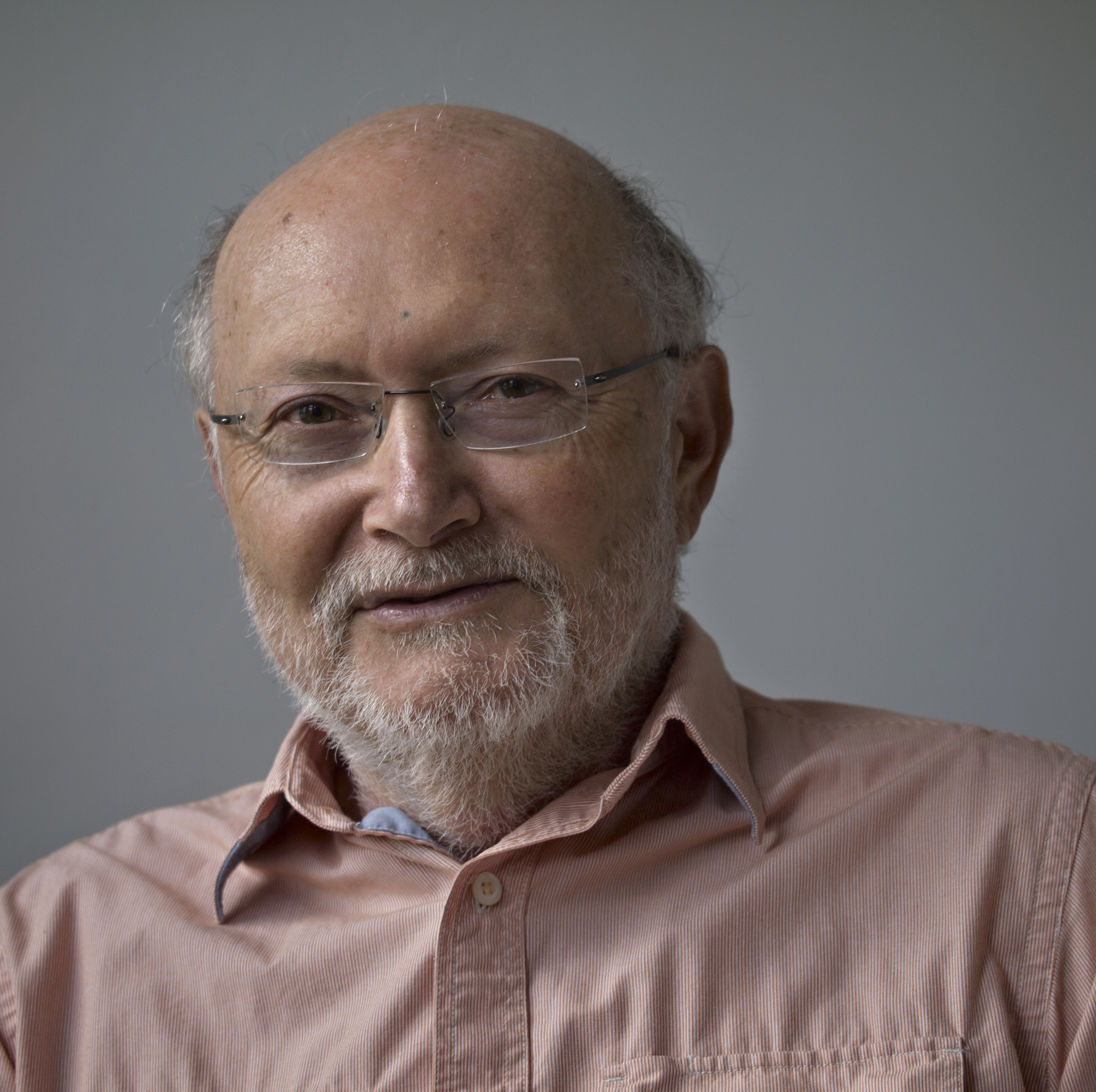
- Gindin in 2012
- Born: Kaminsky Ural, Siberia, former Soviet Union
- Education: University of Manitoba; University of Wisconsin–Madison
- Occupations: Activist; writer
- Spouse: Schuster Gindin
- Writing career
- Genres: Essays; books
- Subjects: Global capitalism; trade unionism; socialism
- Notable work: The Making of Global Capitalism (2012)

Sam Gindin is a Canadian intellectual and activist known for his expertise on the labour movement and the economics of the automobile industry.

Gindin's writings have focused on the Canadian Auto Workers, the auto industry, the crisis in organized labour in Canada and the US, and the political economy of capitalism. In 2012, he published The Making of Global Capitalism: The Political Economy of American Empire, co-written with his lifelong friend Leo Panitch, which traces the development of American-led globalization over more than a century. In 2013, it was awarded the Deutscher Memorial Prize in the UK for best and most creative work in or about the Marxist tradition, and in 2014, it won the Rik Davidson/SPE Book Prize for the best book in political economy by a Canadian. He is also co-author with Leo Panitch and Steve Maher of The Socialist Challenge Today.

The CAW-Sam Gindin Chair in Social Justice and Democracy at Toronto Metropolitan University is the first union-endowed chair at a Canadian university. Its mandate is to "create a hub of interaction between social justice activists and academics at Ryerson University".

== Life ==
Sam Gindin was born in Kaminsky Ural, Siberia in the former Soviet Union, and grew up in Winnipeg, Manitoba.

Gindin is a graduate of the University of Manitoba, and obtained his MA in economics from the University of Wisconsin–Madison. Although he worked as a researcher for the New Democratic Party of Manitoba and taught at the University of Prince Edward Island, Gindin spent most of his working life as the director of research for the Canadian Auto Workers union from 1974 until his retirement in 2000. From 1985 until 2000, he served as assistant to the president of the union, both Bob White and Buzz Hargrove. He participated in collective bargaining, the formation of union and social policy and strategic discussions on the structure and direction of the union. He also wrote a book on the history of the CAW entitled The Canadian Auto Workers: The Birth and Transformation of a Union.

Gindin led the position of Visiting Packer Chair in Social Justice from 2000 to 2010 in the political science department at York University. In 2000, the university announced that Gindin would teach a course "that will bring students and union, anti-poverty, and non-governmental organization activists from around Ontario into the classroom" as a way of building bridges between social activism and university education. It said that half of the students would be community activists and that the course would delve into the philosophy and history of social justice movements "in the context of modern capitalism, the limits of the welfare state, the meaning of globalization, and the impasse of radical politics." Although Gindin no longer serves as Packer Chair, he is still affiliated with York. He also remains active in labour and social movements as a member of the Socialist Project and the Greater Toronto Workers’ Assembly.

== The Making of Global Capitalism ==
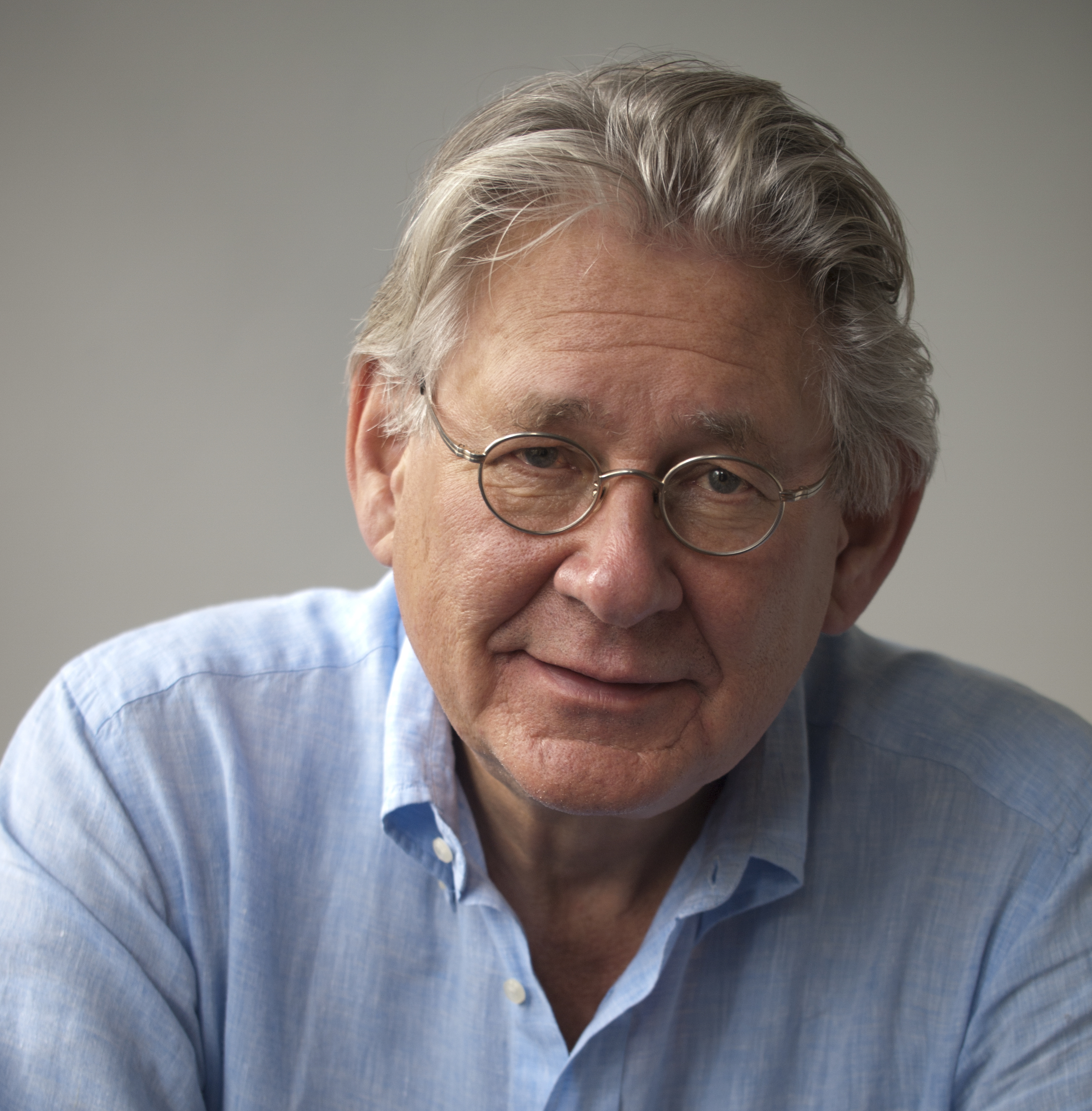
Leo Panitch

In 2012, Sam Gindin, with his friend and colleague Leo Panitch, published The Making of Global Capitalism: The Political Economy of American Empire (2012). As its title suggests, the 456-page book is a comprehensive study of the growth of a global capitalist system over more than a century. Gindin and Panitch argue that the process known as globalization was not an inevitable outcome of expansionary capitalism, but was consciously planned and managed by the United States of America, the world's most powerful state.

They dispute the idea that globalization was driven by multinational corporations that have become more powerful than nation states. For them, this claim ignores the intricate relationships between states and capitalism; states maintain property rights, oversee contracts and sign free trade agreements, for example, while deriving tax revenues and popular legitimacy from the success of capitalist enterprises within their borders.

Panitch and Gindin also dismiss claims that the American Empire is in decline as shown, for example, by U.S. trade deficits, industrial shutdowns and layoffs. They argue that the opposite is true. In recent decades, American firms "restructured key production processes, outsourced others to cheaper and more specialized suppliers and relocated to the U.S. south — all as part of an accelerated general reallocation of capital within the American economy." They write that although it is always highly volatile, the robust and globally dominant U.S. financial system facilitated this economic restructuring while making pools of venture capital available for investment in new, high-tech firms. As a result, the U.S. share of global production remained stable at around one quarter of the total right into the 21st century.

=== American-led global capitalism ===
According to Gindin and Panitch, the institutional foundations for American-led global capitalism were laid during the Great Depression of the 1930s when the Roosevelt administration strengthened the U.S. Federal Reserve and the U.S. Treasury while establishing a wide range of economic and financial regulatory agencies. U.S. entry into World War II led, moreover, to the growth of a permanent American military-industrial complex.

The authors argue that these state financial and military institutions made the U.S. into a Great Power capable of superintending the spread of its own brand of capitalism. The U.S. also dominated post-war global institutions such as the International Monetary Fund and the World Bank, while the American dollar, backed by U.S. Treasury bonds, became the anchor for international finance. Panitch and Gindin write that the American-financed post-war rebuilding of Europe and Japan, "through low-interest loans, direct grants, technological assistance, and favourable trading relations," created the conditions for investment by U.S. multi-national corporations and eventually for substantial foreign investment in the U.S.

=== America's informal empire ===
As they trace the history of global capitalism, Gindin and Panitch write that in the years after World War II, the U.S. succeeded in building an "informal empire" integrating other capitalist states into a co-ordinated, global capitalist system:

The U.S. informal empire constituted a distinctly new form of political rule. Instead of aiming for territorial expansion along the lines of the old empires, U.S. military interventions were primarily aimed at preventing the closure of particular places or whole regions of the globe to capital accumulation. This was part of a larger remit of creating openings for or removing barriers to capital in general, not just U.S. capital. The maintenance and indeed steady growth of U.S. military installations around the globe after World War II, mostly on the territory of independent states, needs to be seen in this light rather than in terms of securing territorial space for the exclusive U.S. use of natural resources and accumulation by its corporations.

Although the U.S. dominates in this informal, imperial system, Gindin and Panitch argue that other advanced capitalist states maintain their sovereignty, but must defer to American wishes when it comes to military interventions abroad. "The American state arrogated to itself," they argue, "the sole right to intervene against other sovereign states (which it repeatedly did around the world), and largely reserved to its own discretion the interpretation of international rules and norms."

=== From golden age to crisis ===
The Making of Global Capitalism chronicles the “golden age” of capitalism during the 1950s and '60s when capitalists enjoyed high profits in a booming, full-employment American economy. Workers benefited too from improved social programs and the higher wages that labour unions fought for and won. But, as the authors point out, capitalism is prone to crisis, and the 1970s produced "stagflation", simultaneously high rates of inflation and unemployment, stagnant economies and declining profits.

In 1979, Paul Volcker, Chairman of the Federal Reserve found a way out of the crisis by administering the "Volcker shock", double-digit interest rates. The deep recession that followed brought high unemployment and with that, a decline over time of labour militancy. The adoption of neoliberal policies during the 1980s led to state restrictions on strikes and organizing rights making it possible for capitalists to "discipline" workers by demanding greater "flexibility" in hours and working conditions and by holding down wages. Neoliberalism also led to an array of free trade agreements that promoted worldwide corporate investment and production.

According to Gindin and Panitch, the neoliberal era ushered in a second, highly-profitable "golden age", but this time only for the capitalist class, not for workers whose wages stagnated while union membership declined.

=== 2008 financial crisis ===
The final chapter in the book is devoted to a detailed examination of the 2008 financial crisis bringing an end to high corporate profits as millions lost their homes and consumer spending fell. Gindin and Panitch write that the crisis was preceded by decades of growth in volatile financial markets that had become crucial to underwriting capitalist expansion. They argue that the U.S. encouraged the growth in financial markets with its accompanying risk-taking even though it was periodically required "to put out financial conflagrations" such as the 1997 Asian financial crisis. The crisis of 2007-08, however, was not regional, but global:

The roots of the crisis, in fact, lay in the growing global importance of U.S. mortgage finance – a development which could not be understood apart from the expanded state support for home ownership, a long-standing element in the integration of workers into U.S. capitalism. Since the 1980s, wages had stagnated and social programs had been eroded, reinforcing workers' dependence on the rising value of their homes as a source of economic security. The decisive role of American state agencies in encouraging the development of mortgage-backed securities figured prominently in their spread throughout global financial markets. The close linkages between these markets and the American state were thus crucial both to the making of the U.S. housing bubble and to its profound global impact when it burst, as mortgage-backed securities became difficult to value and to sell, thus freezing the world's financial markets.

Gindin and Panitch add that the collapse of housing prices led to a sharp decline in U.S. consumer spending because housing represented a main source of workers' wealth. "The bursting of the housing bubble," they write, "thus had much greater effects than had the earlier bursting of the stock-market bubble at the turn of the century, and much greater implications for global capitalism in terms of the role the U.S. played as 'consumer of last resort'."

The authors note that the U.S., as manager-in-chief of the global capitalist system, once again came to the rescue with billions of dollars in bail-out money for domestic and foreign banks.

== Work ==
=== Books ===
- The Socialist Challenge Today (co-authored with Leo Panitch and Stephen Maher), Merlin Press: 2019
- The Making of Global Capitalism: The Political Economy of American Empire (co-authored with Leo Panitch), Verso: 2012
- In and Out of Crisis: The Global Financial Meltdown and Left Alternatives (co-authored with Greg Albo and Leo Panitch), PM Press: 2010
- The Canadian Auto Workers: The Birth and Transformation of a Union, James Lorimer & Company: 1995

=== Articles ===
- Superintending Global Capital (co-authored with Leo Panitch), New Left Review 35, 2005
- Global Capitalism and American Empire (co-authored with Leo Panitch), Socialist Register 40, 2004

Awards
| Preceded by David McNally | Deutscher Memorial Prize; 2013; With: Leo Panitch | Succeeded by Roland Boer |
