= Minna Keal =

British composer

- Born: Mina Nerenstein; 22 March 1909; London
- Died: 14 November 1999 (aged 90)
- Education: Royal Academy of Music
- Occupation: composer
- Spouses: Barnett Samuel; Bill Keal
- Children: Raphael Samuel

Minna Keal, née Mina Nerenstein (22 March 1909 – 14 November 1999) was a British composer. After early compositions as a student, she only returned to composing at the end of her life. At the age of 80, when her music was first performed at the Proms in 1989, she experienced her return to composition as a new chapter in her life:

I felt I was coming to the end of my life, but now I feel as if I'm just beginning. I feel as if I'm living my life in reverse.

== Life ==
Mina Nerenstein was born at 81 Wentworth Street, Spitalfields in East London, the daughter of Russian-Jewish immigrants from Belarus who ran a Hebrew bookselling business in Petticoat Lane. Her father died in 1926. In 1928, she entered the Royal Academy of Music, studying piano with Thomas Knott and composition with William Alwyn.

Keal made a promising start as a composer, with several concerts at the Academy and in the East End at Whitechapel Gallery and the People's Palace. Her surviving student works include a Fantasie in C minor for violin and piano, a Ballade in F minor for viola and piano (first performed in 1929 by Philip Burton of the Griller Quartet) and Three Summer Sketches for piano. These early compositions are particularly passionate and full of rich harmonies and vibrant melodies, and show the influence of Bruch and Debussy.

In 1929, aged 20, she was forced to give up her musical study to help her mother in the family business. She married Barnett Samuel, a solicitor, had a son, Raphael (later a well-known Marxist historian), and gave up composing. During the 1930s she was active in left-wing politics, joining the British Communist Party in 1939. When the Anschluss occurred, she began working with local citizenry to help evacuate Jewish children who were being transported to Britain from Nazi occupied territories. On the break-up of her first marriage during World War II Mina worked in an aircraft factory near Slough. There, she met Bill Keal, and they eventually married in 1959.

== Re-emergence as a composer ==
In 1975, the composer Justin Connolly, having stumbled across some of Keal's youthful music archived at the Royal Academy of Music, encouraged her to start composing again, and she took composition lessons with him. Her String Quartet, Op. 1, was completed in 1978 and first performed in 1989: it shows a new awareness of Bartok and Shostakovich. The Wind Quintet, Op. 2, followed in 1980.

After taking lessons with Oliver Knussen in 1982, she completed her four-movement Symphony, Op. 3, which was performed as a BBC broadcast in 1988 and at the BBC Proms in 1989. Marie Fitzpatrick describes it as "a powerful, stormy, dissonantly chromatic work, organized around Golden Sections and making free melodic use of 12–note technique". The composer said it was "about the turmoil of human existence and the spiritual search for serenity and permanence".

Cantillation for violin and orchestra, Op. 4, drew inspiration from chanting she remembered in synagogues as a girl. It was completed in 1988 and first performed in 1991. Between 1988 and 1994 Keal worked on the Cello Concerto, Op. 5, which was subsequently recorded by Alexander Baillie and the BBC Scottish Symphony Orchestra under Martyn Brabbins for the NMC label. On the same record is her early Ballade (1929) for cello and piano, in which Alexander Baillie is accompanied by pianist Martina Baillie. The Ballade has also been performed on the viola.

In 1999 the Royal Academy of Music organised a 90th birthday concert. Later that year she died at her home, Acres Plough, Shootacre Lane in Princes Risborough, predeceased by both her husband and her son. Her ashes were buried in her son Raphael's grave.

== Recordings ==
- A Life in Reverse. String Quintet, Wind Quintet, Symphony, Cantillation. Stephen Bryant (violin), BBC Symphony Orchestra cond. Nicholas Cleobury; Lontano, cond. Odaline de la Martinez; Archaeus String Quartet. LORELT LNT110
- Cello Concerto, Ballade. Alexander Baillie (cello), Martina Baillie (piano), BBC Scottish Symphony Orchestra, cond. Martin Brabbins. NMC D0485
- La Viola. Ballade in F minor. Hillary Herndon, Wei-Chun Bernadette Lo. MSR Classics MS 1416
