= Perry Anderson =

British historian (born 1938)

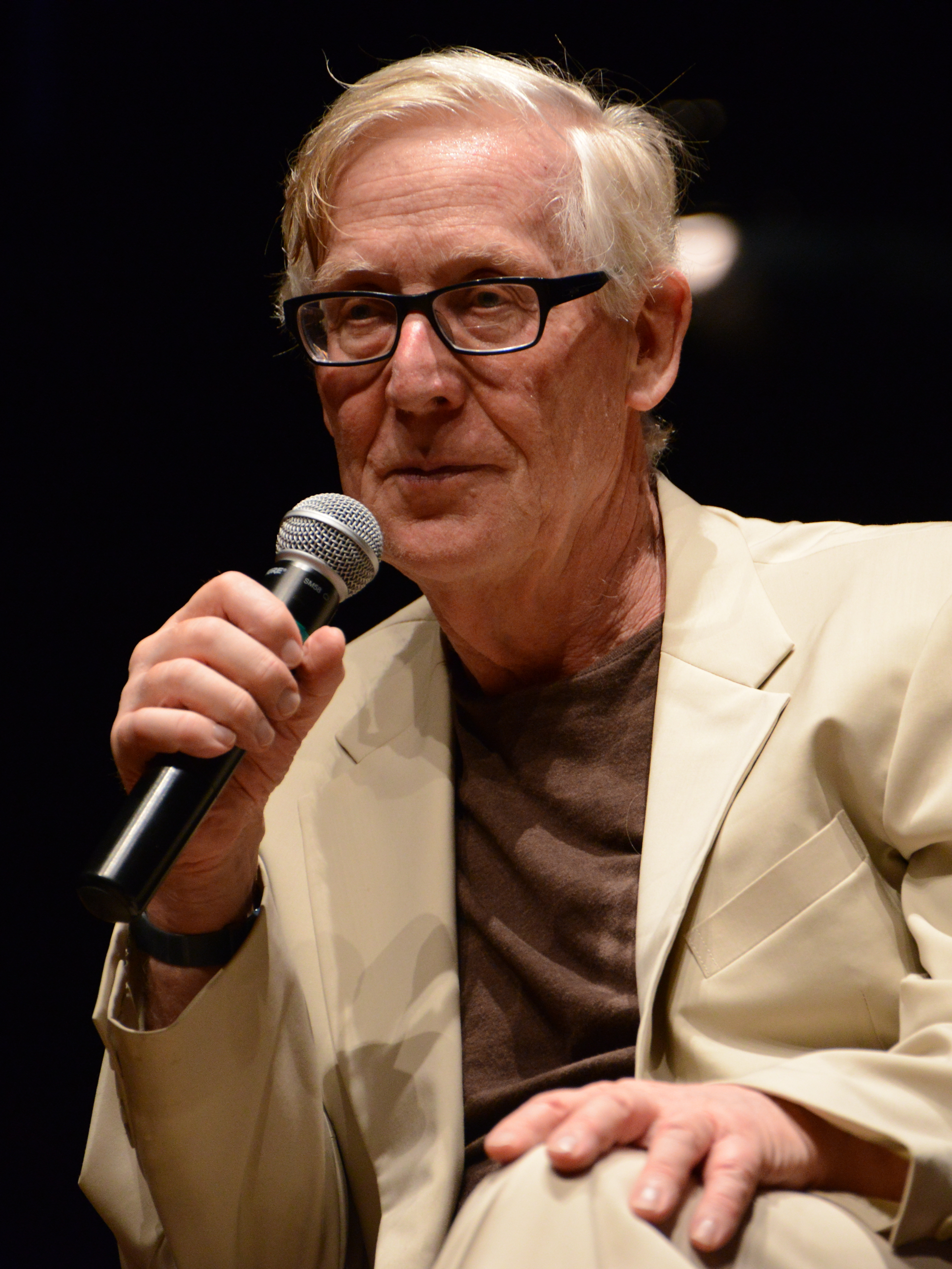
- Anderson in 2012
- Born: Francis Rory Peregrine Anderson; 11 September 1938 (age 88); London, England
- Occupations: Political philosopher, historian, essayist
- Spouse: Juliet Mitchell (m. 1962; div. 1972)
- Relatives: Benedict Anderson (brother)

Academic background
- Education: Worcester College, Oxford

Academic work
- School or tradition: New Left

Francis Rory Peregrine "Perry" Anderson (born 11 September 1938) is a British intellectual, political philosopher, historian and essayist. His work ranges across historical sociology, intellectual history, and cultural analysis. Anderson's early work was more theoretical, concerned with working out problems in historical materialism. His mature work is marked by a concern with intellectual biographies and national histories.

Anderson is perhaps best known as the moving force behind the New Left Review. He is Professor of History and Sociology at the University of California, Los Angeles (UCLA). Anderson has written many books, most recently Different Speeds, Same Furies: Powell, Proust and other Literary Forms and Disputing Disaster: A Sextet on the Great War. He is the brother of political scientist Benedict Anderson.

== Background and early life ==
Anderson was born in London on 11 September 1938. His father, James Carew O'Gorman Anderson (1893–1946), known as Séamas, an official with the Chinese Maritime Customs, was born into an Anglo-Irish family, the younger son of Brigadier-General Sir Francis Anderson, of Ballydavid, County Waterford. He was descended from the Anderson family of Ardbrake, Bothriphnie, Scotland, who had settled in Ireland in the early 18th century.

Anderson's mother, Veronica Beatrice Mary Bigham, was English, the daughter of Trevor Bigham, who was the Deputy Commissioner of the London Metropolitan Police, 1914–1931. Anderson's grandmother, Frances, Lady Anderson, belonged to the Gaelic Gorman clan of County Clare and was the daughter of the Irish Home Rule Member of Parliament Major Purcell O'Gorman, himself the son of Nicholas Purcell O'Gorman who had been involved with the Republican Society of United Irishmen during the 1798 Rebellion, later becoming Secretary of the Catholic Association in the 1820s. Anderson's father had previously been married to the novelist Stella Benson, and it was after her death in 1933 that he married again.

Anderson was educated at Eton and Worcester College, Oxford, where he took his first degree. Early in his life, Anderson made a brief foray into rock criticism, writing under the pseudonym Richard Merton.

== Career ==
In 1962 Anderson became editor of the New Left Review, a position he held for twenty years. As scholars of the New Left began to reassess their canon in the mid-1970s, Anderson provided an influential perspective. He published two major volumes of analytical history in 1974: Passages from Antiquity to Feudalism focuses on the creation and endurance of feudal social formations, while Lineages of the Absolutist State examines monarchical absolutism. Within their respective topics they are each vast in scope, assessing the whole history of Europe from classical times to the nineteenth century. The books achieved an instant prominence for Anderson, whose wide-ranging analysis synthesised elements of history, philosophy, and political theory.

In the 1980s, Anderson took office as a professor at the New School for Social Research in New York. He returned as editor at NLR in 2000 for three more years, and after his retirement continued to serve on the journal's editorial committee. As of 2019, he has continued to make contributions to the London Review of Books, and pursued teaching as a Distinguished Professor of History and Sociology at the University of California, Los Angeles.

== Influence and criticism ==
Anderson bore the brunt of the disapproval of E. P. Thompson in the latter's The Poverty of Theory, in a controversy during the late 1970s over the structuralist Marxism of Louis Althusser, and the use of history and theory in the politics of the Left. In the mid-1960s, Thompson wrote an essay for the annual Socialist Register that rejected Anderson's view of aristocratic dominance of Britain's historical trajectory, as well as Anderson's seeming preference for continental European theorists over radical British traditions and empiricism. Anderson delivered two responses to Thompson's polemics, first in an essay in New Left Review (January–February 1966) called "Socialism and Pseudo-Empiricism", and then in a more conciliatory yet ambitious overview, Arguments within English Marxism (1980).

While Anderson faced many attacks in his native Britain for favouring continental European philosophers over British thinkers, he did not spare Western European Marxists from criticism, such as in his Considerations on Western Marxism (1976). Nevertheless, many of his assaults were delivered against postmodernist currents in continental Europe. In his book In the Tracks of Historical Materialism, Anderson depicts Paris as the new capital of intellectual reaction.

== Works ==
- Passages From Antiquity to Feudalism (1974). London: New Left Books. ISBN 090230870X.
- Lineages of the Absolutist State (1974). London: New Left Books. ISBN 0902308165.
- Considerations on Western Marxism (1976). London: Verso. ISBN 0860917207.
- The Antinomies of Antonio Gramsci [1976] (2017). London: Verso. ISBN 978-1786633729.
- Arguments within English Marxism (1980). London: Verso. ISBN 0860917274.
- In the Tracks of Historical Materialism (1983). London: Verso. ISBN 0860910768.
- English Questions (1992). London: Verso. ISBN 0860913759.
- A Zone of Engagement (1992). London: Verso. ISBN 0860913775.
- The Origins of Postmodernity (1998). London: Verso. ISBN 1859842224.
- Spectrum: From Right to Left in the World of Ideas (2005). London: Verso. ISBN 1859845274.
- The New Old World (2009). London: Verso. ISBN 9781844673124.
- The Indian Ideology (2012). New Delhi: Three Essays Collective. ISBN 9788188789924.
- American Foreign Policy and Its Thinkers (2014). London: Verso. ISBN 178168667X.
- The H-Word: The Peripeteia of Hegemony (2017). London: Verso. ISBN 978-1786633682.
- Brazil Apart: 1964–2019 (2019). London: Verso. ISBN 978-1788737944
- Ever Closer Union? Europe in the West (2021). London: Verso. ISBN 978-1839764417
- Different Speeds, Same Furies: Powell, Proust and other Literary Forms (2022). London: Verso. ISBN 978-1804290798.
- Disputing Disaster: A Sextet on the Great War (2024) London: Verso. ISBN 978-1804297674
