= Alfred Shankland =

Alfred Shankland (22 November 1877 - 30 January 1952) was a Church of England priest who was Dean of Barbados from 1917 to 1938.

Shankland was educated at St Boniface College, Warminster, and ordained in 1902. His first posts were curacies in Oakridge, Gloucestershire and Berkeley in the same county. After this he served as: Rector of St Peter, Montserrat; St George, Antigua; and St David, Barbados until his appointment as Dean. Afterwards he was Archdeacon of the island from 1938 to 1951.
