= Lineages of the Absolutist State =

Book by Perry Anderson

- Author: Perry Anderson
- Language: English
- Publication date: 1974
- Media type: Hardcover
- Pages: 573
- ISBN: 978-0-902-30816-9

Lineages of the Absolutist State is a book by Perry Anderson.

Ellen Kay Trimberger notes Anderson has no theory about "differences in the development of European states, landed classes, or capitalism." and differences are not linked to theory. According to Trimberger, Anderson "fails in his claims to link theory and history."
