= Graeme Shankland =

- Born: January 31, 1917; Merseyside, England
- Died: 1984 (aged 66–67)
- Education: Stowe School; Queens' College, Cambridge
- Occupation: Town planner
- Known for: Urban planning, Shankland, Cox and Associates
- Notable work: Liverpool City Centre Plan (1965), Leicester Central Area Plan (1962), Derby Town Centre redevelopment (1960s), Bolton Town Centre Plan (1965)
- Parents: Ernest Shankland (father); Violet Cooper (née Lindsay) (mother)

Graeme Shankland (1917–1984) was an English town planner active in the 1960s. With Oliver Cox he established the partnership Shankland, Cox and Associates which under took commissions from Harold Wilson's Labour government. He played a principal role in drawing up the modernisation plans for Hook, Hart in Hampshire. However, local opposition successfully thwarted these plans.

== Early life ==
Graeme was born on 31 January 1917 in Merseyside. His father, Ernest Shankland, was the Assistant Marine Surveyor for the Mersey Docks and Harbour Company. His mother was Violet Cooper (née Lindsay). The family moved to London in 1923. His father was appointed Chief Harbour Master at the Port of London in 1926. He attended Stowe School followed by Queens' College, Cambridge, graduating in Architecture and Design in 1940. During this period he attended lectures by Nikolaus Pevsner and developed an interest in William Morris. He had already developed an interest in town planning and joined William Holford in a team designing hostels for factory workers. In 1942 he joined the Royal Engineers and the Communist Party. Having seen active service in Africa, the Middle East and Malaya he was demobbed in 1946.

== Career ==
=== Liverpool City Centre Plan ===
In the 1960s, Shankland advised Liverpool City Council on urban renewal. In his words, Liverpool was "glaringly obsolete". The final Liverpool City Centre Plan of 1965 declared two-thirds of the city's buildings obsolete and proposed road building on a huge scale, but also recognised that Liverpool had an outstanding Victorian architecture that should be preserved.

In Shankland's panorama of the future city centre, a large public square has taken the place of St John's Gardens. The five 21-storey towers of the proposed Strand-Paradise Street housing and retail development were never built, and the Liverpool One shopping centre now occupies part of the site.

Shankland foresaw Liverpool's potential as a tourist destination and worked alongside Liverpudlian architectural historian Quentin Hughes, whose advocacy for architectural conservation was adopted as official policy in 1967.

Shankland's redevelopment vision for Liverpool ultimately faltered due to a lack of funding, although not before approximately 30,000 habitable homes were demolished and the city's population was nearly reduced by half.
