= New Reasoner =

British political journal (1957–1959)

The New Reasoner
- Cover of the first issue of The New Reasoner: A Quarterly Journal of Socialist Humanism, Summer 1957
- Editor: John Saville and E. P. Thompson
- First issue: 1957
- Final issue: 1959
- Country: England
- Language: English

The New Reasoner was a British journal of dissident Communism published from 1957 to 1959 by John Saville and E. P. Thompson. The publication is best remembered as an antecedent of the long-running journal New Left Review.

== The Reasoner ==
The New Reasoner was preceded by a journal entitled The Reasoner, first published in July 1956 by John Saville and E. P. Thompson. The editors proposed the use of the journal as a forum for the discussion of "questions of fundamental principle, aim, and strategy," critiquing Stalinism as well as the dogmatic politics of the Communist Party of Great Britain (CPGB).

The Reasoner took its name from an early 19th-century publication which had attempted to renew and reinvigorate a flagging Jacobin Radicalism.

Over its five months of existence, the journal angered many within the leadership of the CPGB. Thompson and Saville were ordered to cease publication of their dissident journal, an order they chose to defy. Because of their refusal, Thompson and Saville were suspended from the CPGB.

== The New Reasoner ==
In 1957, following their resignation from the CPGB over its support of the Soviet Union's invasion of Hungary, Thompson and Saville began the publication of a new journal, named the New Reasoner, with the purpose of contributing to "the re-discovery of our traditions, the affirmation of socialist values, and the undogmatic perception of social reality." The opening editorial was a reaffirmation of their commitment to the British Marxist and Communist tradition, despite their departure from the Party. They allied themselves with European workers who were fighting for "de-stalinisation" and called for the rebirth of principles within the movement.

In 1960 the New Reasoner merged with the Universities and Left Review journal to become New Left Review.
