= New Left Review =

British bimonthly journal (founded 1960)

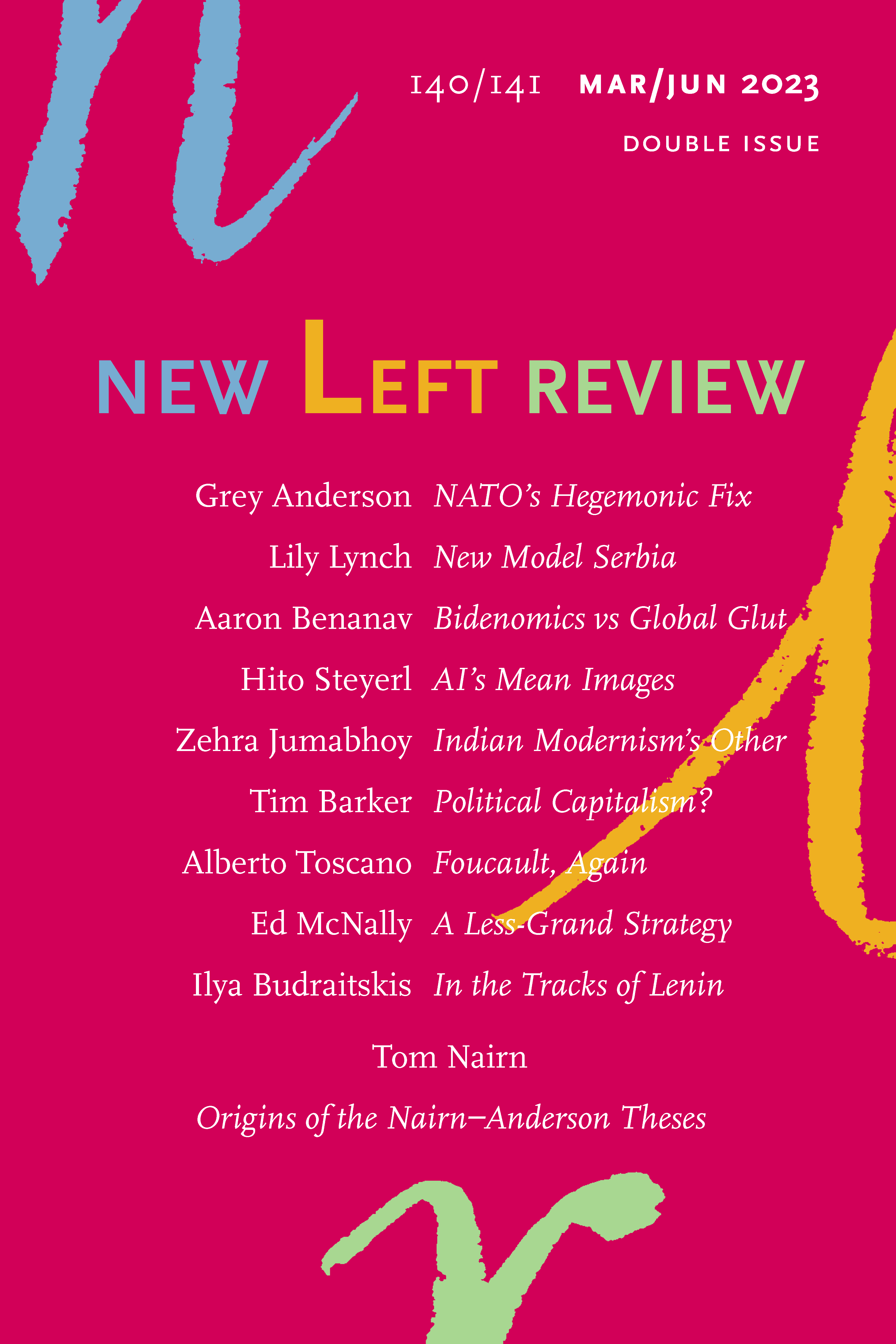
- Discipline: Politics
- Language: English
- Edited by: Susan Watkins

Publication details
- History: 1960–present
- Publisher: New Left Review Ltd (United Kingdom)
- Frequency: Bimonthly
- Impact factor: 1.967 (2018)

Standard abbreviations
- ISO 4: New Left Rev.

Indexing
- ISSN: 0028-6060
- LCCN: 63028333
- OCLC no.: 1605213

Links
- Journal homepage; Online archive

New Left Review is a British bimonthly journal, established in 1960, which analyses international politics, the global economy, social theory, and cultural topics from a leftist perspective.

== History ==
=== Background ===
As part of the emerging British "New Left" in the late 1950s, a number of journals were launched to carry commentary on matters of Marxist theory. One of these was The Reasoner, founded by historians E. P. Thompson and John Saville in July 1956. Three quarterly issues were produced. The publication was expanded and further developed from 1957 to 1959 as The New Reasoner, with an additional ten issues produced. The New Reasoner distanced itself from the British Communist Party and USSR in the wake of Nikita Khrushchev's February 1956 "Secret Speech" on the Stalinist cult of personality, and the Soviet repression of the Hungarian Uprising in November 1956.

Another radical journal of the period was the Universities and Left Review, a publication started in 1957 with less allegiance to the British communist tradition. This journal was youth-orientated and pacifist in nature, expressing opposition to the militaristic rhetoric of the Cold War, voicing strong disagreement with the 1956 Suez War, and supporting the burgeoning Campaign for Nuclear Disarmament (CND).

=== Establishment ===
New Left Review was established in January 1960 when The New Reasoner and Universities and Left Review merged their Boards. The first editor-in-chief of the merged publication was Stuart Hall. The early New Left Review style, featuring illustrations on the cover and in the interior layout, was more irreverent and free-flowing than the publication's later issues, which tended to be more sombre and academic. Hall was succeeded as editor in 1962 by Perry Anderson.

In 1993, nineteen of the members of the editorial committee resigned, citing a loss of control over content by the Editorial Board/Committee in favour of a Shareholders' Trust, which they argued was undemocratic. The Trust—composed of Perry Anderson, his brother Benedict Anderson, and Ronald Fraser—said that a change was necessary for the financial sustainability of New Left Review. The journal was relaunched in 2000, and Perry Anderson returned as editor until 2003.

=== Since 2008 ===
New Left Review closely followed the 2008 financial crisis as well as its aftermath and its global political repercussions. A 2011 essay by Wolfgang Streeck, titled "The Crises of Democratic Capitalism", was called "the most powerful description of what has gone wrong in western societies" by the Financial Times's contributor Christopher Caldwell.

In the early 2020s, the journal's editorial committee included figures such as Tariq Ali, Robin Blackburn, Mike Davis, Nancy Fraser, Benjamin Kunkel, and Julian Stallabrass, while Oliver Eagleton served on the editorial staff.

== Abstracting and indexing ==
In 2003, New Left Review was ranked 12th by impact factor on a list of the top 20 political science journals in the world. By 2018, however, the Journal Citation Reports rated it 51st out of 176 journals in the category "Political Science", with an impact factor of 1.967. In 2023, the citation database Scopus placed New Left Review in the 69th percentile, 214th out of 706 "Political Science and International Relations" journals, with a citation score of 2.2.
