= History of democratic socialism =

Democratic socialism represents the modernist development of socialism and its outspoken support for democracy. The origins of democratic socialism can be traced back to 19th-century utopian socialist thinkers and the Chartist movement in Great Britain, which somewhat differed in their goals but shared a common demand of democratic decision making and public ownership of the means of production, and viewed these as fundamental characteristics of the society they advocated for. Democratic socialism was also heavily influenced by the gradualist form of socialism promoted by the British Fabian Society and Eduard Bernstein's evolutionary socialism.

In the 19th century, democratic socialism was repressed by many governments; countries such as Germany and Italy banned democratic socialist parties. With the expansion of liberal democracy and universal suffrage during the 20th century, democratic socialism became a mainstream movement which expanded across the world. Democratic socialists played a major role in liberal democracy, often forming governing parties or acting as the main opposition party (one major exception being the United States).

== 19th century ==
=== Background and origins ===
Socialist models and ideas espousing common or public ownership have existed since antiquity. Fenner Brockway identified three early democratic socialist groups during the English Civil War in his book Britain's First Socialists, namely the Levellers, who were pioneers of political democracy and the sovereignty of the people; the Agitators, who were the pioneers of participatory control by the ranks at their workplace, and the Diggers, who were pioneers of communal ownership, cooperation and egalitarianism. The philosophy and tradition of the Diggers and the Levellers was continued in the period described by E. P. Thompson in The Making of the English Working Class by Jacobin groups like the London Corresponding Society and by polemicists such as Thomas Paine. Their concern for both democracy and social justice marked them out as key precursors of democratic socialism.

The first self-conscious socialist movements developed in the 1820s and 1830s. Western European social critics, including Robert Owen, Charles Fourier, Pierre-Joseph Proudhon, Louis Blanc, Charles Hall, and Henri de Saint-Simon, were the first modern socialists who criticised the excessive poverty and inequality generated by the Industrial Revolution. The first advocates of socialism favoured social levelling in order to create a meritocratic or technocratic society based on individual talent as opposed to aristocratic privilege. Saint-Simon is regarded as the first individual to coin the term socialism. Saint-Simon was fascinated by the enormous potential of science and technology and advocated a socialist society that would eliminate the disorderly aspects of capitalism and would be based on equal opportunities. He advocated the creation of a society in which each person was ranked according to his or her capacities and rewarded according to his or her work. The key focus of Saint-Simon's socialism was on administrative efficiency and industrialism and a belief that science was the key to the progress of human civilisation. This was accompanied by a desire to implement a rationally organised economy based on planning and geared towards large-scale scientific progress and material progress, embodying a desire for a more directed or planned economy.

The term "socialism" was first used in English in the British Cooperative Magazine in 1827 and came to be associated with the followers of Owen such as the Rochdale Pioneers, who founded the co-operative movement. Owen's followers stressed both participatory democracy and economic socialisation in the form of consumer co-operatives, credit unions, and mutual aid societies. In the case of the Owenites, they also overlapped with a number of other working-class and labour movements such as the Chartists in the United Kingdom.

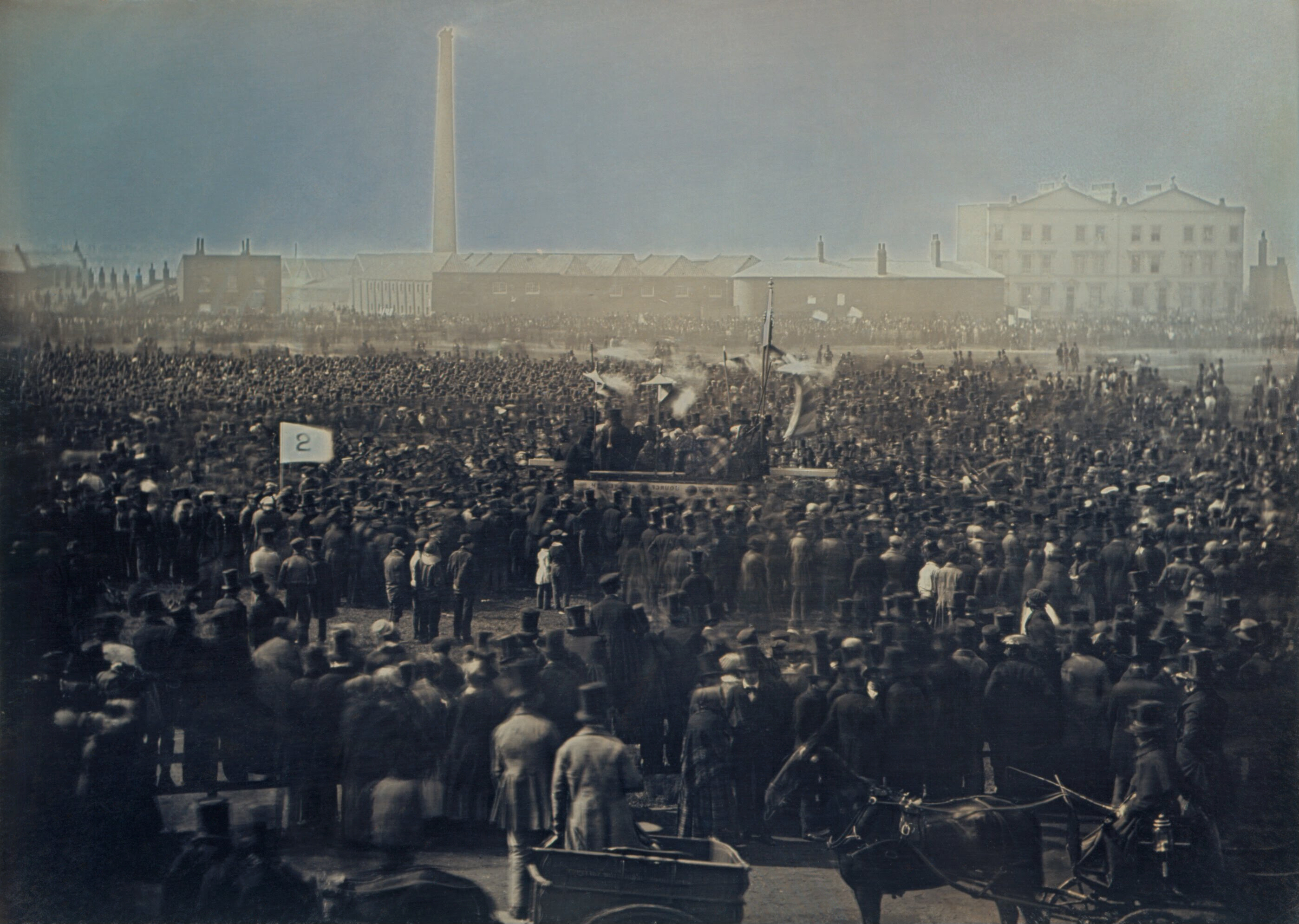
Photograph of the Great Chartist Meeting on Kennington Common, London, 1848

The Chartists gathered significant numbers around the People's Charter of 1838 which demanded the extension of suffrage to all male adults. Leaders in the movement also called for a more equitable distribution of income and better living conditions for the working classes. The very first trade unions and consumers' cooperative societies also emerged in the hinterland of the Chartist movement as a way of bolstering the fight for these demands.

The Chartists were part of a Europe-wide wave of agitation for social reform and democratic rule, which peaked in the Revolutions of 1848. In France, the voice of this movement was La Montagne, also known as the Democratic Socialists. Karl Marx disliked La Montagne, viewing it as a party dominated by the middle class; he called them Sozialdemokrat, the first recorded use of the term social democracy.

Around the same time, the British political philosopher John Stuart Mill also came to advocate a form of economic socialism within a liberal context known as liberal socialism. In later editions of Principles of Political Economy (1848), Mill would argue that "as far as economic theory was concerned, there is nothing in principle in economic theory that precludes an economic order based on socialist policies."

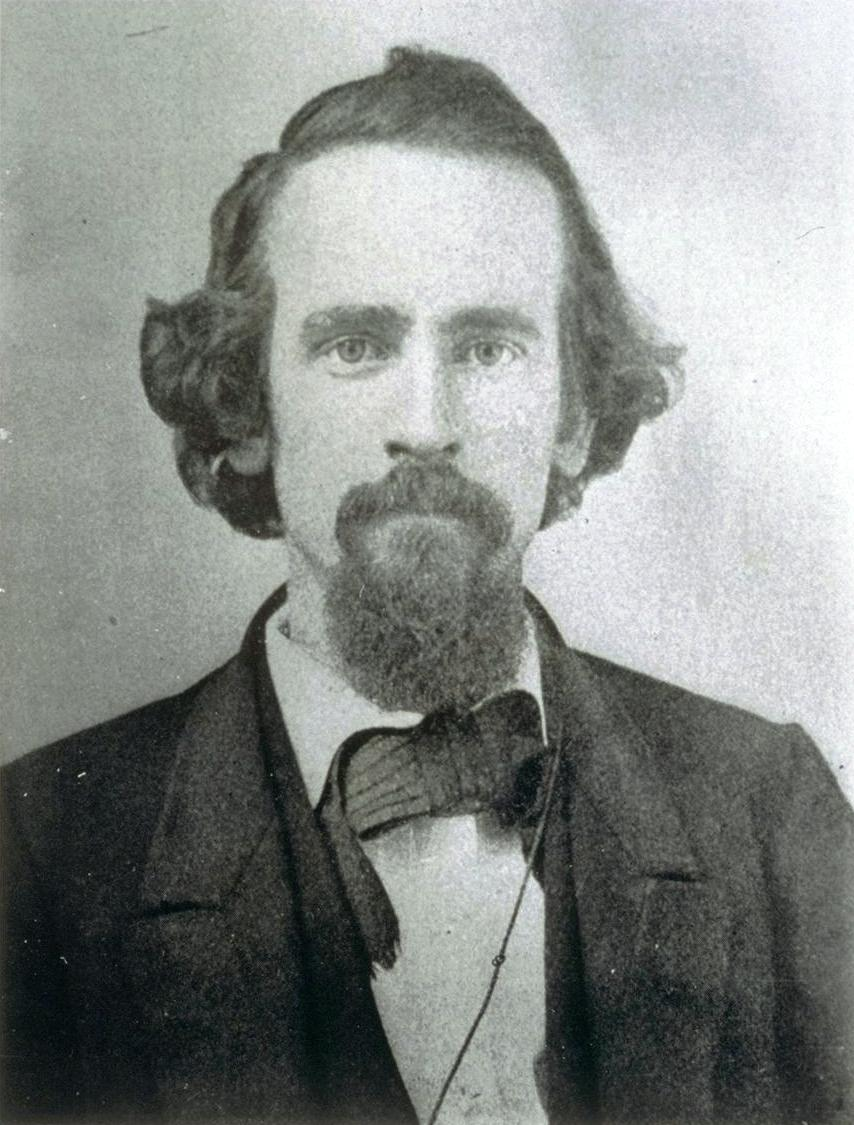
Henry George, a social reformer whose geoist movement greatly influenced the development of democratic socialism

Later, the American social reformer Henry George and his geoist movement influenced the development of democratic socialism, especially in relation to British socialism and Fabianism, along with Mill and the German historical school of economics.

=== 1880s-1900s ===
By the 1880s, these threads had cohered into a socialist movement, with major parties emerging in countries such as Britain and Germany. In 1889 (the centennial of the French Revolution of 1789), the Second International was founded, with 384 delegates from twenty countries representing about 300 labour and socialist organisations. It was termed the Socialist International and Friedrich Engels was elected honorary president at the third congress in 1893. Anarchists were ejected and not allowed in mainly due to pressure from Marxists. Anarchist writer George Woodcock has argued that at some point the Second International turned "into a battleground over the issue of libertarian versus authoritarian socialism. Not only did they effectively present themselves as champions of minority rights; they also provoked the German Marxists into demonstrating a dictatorial intolerance which was a factor in preventing the British labour movement from following the Marxist direction indicated by such leaders as H. M. Hyndman."

==== In Britain ====
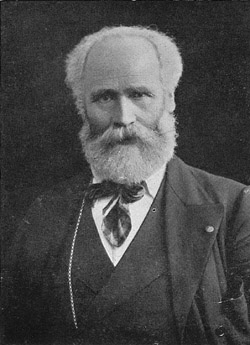
Keir Hardie, an early democratic socialist who founded the British Independent Labour Party

In the United Kingdom, the democratic socialist tradition was represented by William Morris's Socialist League (founded 1884) and the Fabian Society (1885) and later the Independent Labour Party founded by Keir Hardie in the 1890s, of which writer George Orwell would later become a prominent member.

The Fabian Society is a British socialist organisation which was established with the purpose of advancing the principles of socialism via gradualist and reformist means. The society functions primarily as a think tank and is one of the fifteen socialist societies affiliated with the Labour Party. Similar societies exist in Australia (the Australian Fabian Society), in Canada (the Douglas-Coldwell Foundation, and the since disbanded League for Social Reconstruction) and in New Zealand. The society laid many of the foundations of the Labour Party and subsequently affected the policies of states emerging from the decolonisation of the British Empire, most notably India and Singapore. Originally, the Fabian Society was committed to the establishment of a socialist economy, alongside a commitment to British imperialism and colonialism as a progressive and modernising force.

==== In Germany ====
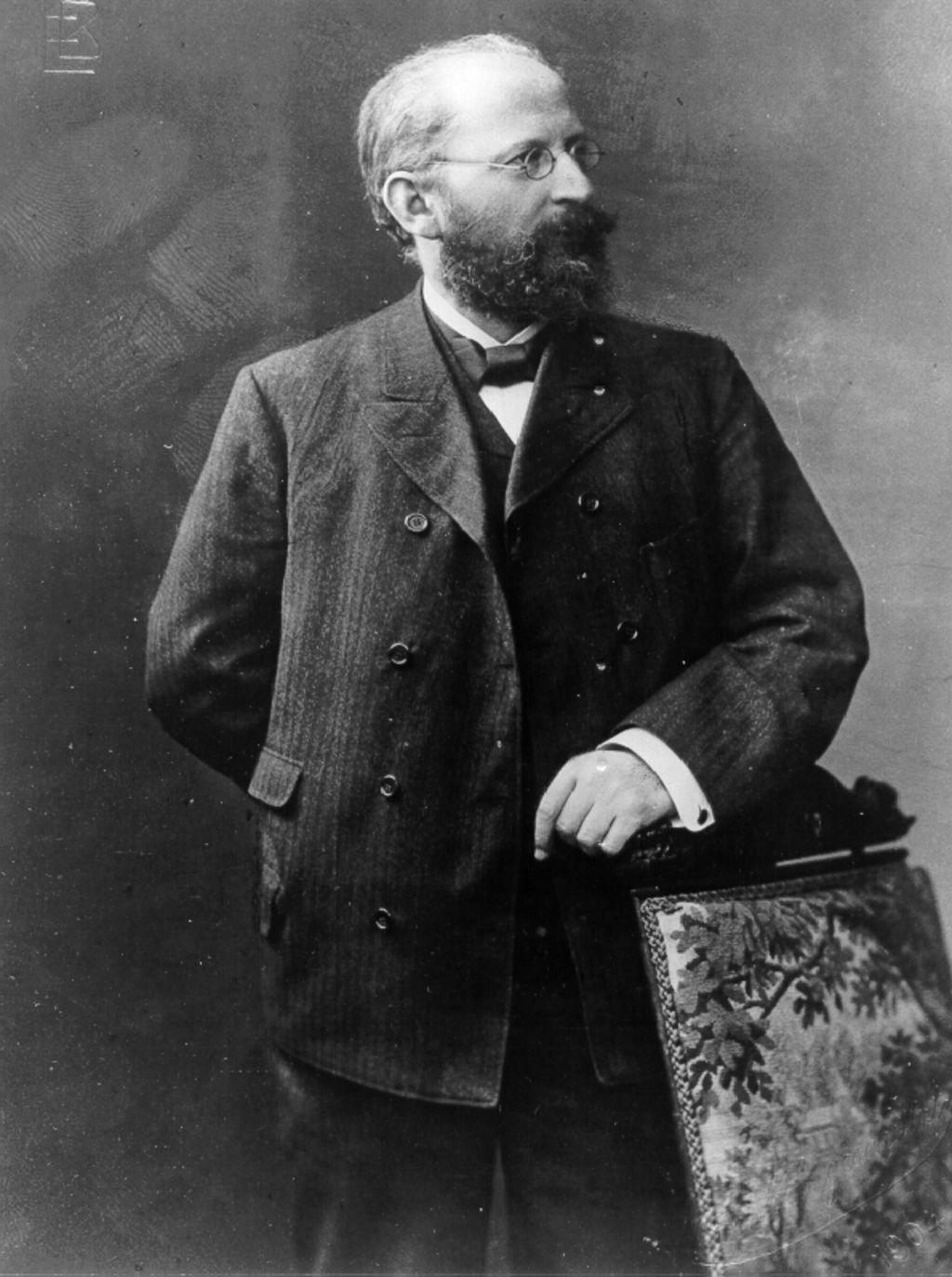
Eduard Bernstein, a socialist theorist within the German Social Democratic Party who proposed that socialism could be achieved by peaceful means through incremental legislative reforms in democratic societies

In Germany, democratic socialism became a prominent movement at the end of the 19th century, when the Eisenach's Social Democratic Workers' Party of Germany merged with Lassalle's General German Workers' Association in 1875 to form the Social Democratic Party of Germany. Reformism arose as an alternative to revolution, with leading social democrat Eduard Bernstein proposing the concept of evolutionary socialism. Revolutionary socialists, encompassing multiple social and political movements that may define revolution differently from one another, quickly targeted the nascent ideology of reformism and Rosa Luxemburg condemned Bernstein's Evolutionary Socialism in her 1900 essay titled Social Reform or Revolution? The Social Democratic Party of Germany became the largest and most powerful socialist party in Europe despite being an illegal organisation under Otto von Bismarck's Anti-Socialist Laws until they were repealed in 1890. In the 1893 German federal election, the party gained about 1,787,000 votes, a quarter of the total votes cast according to Engels. In 1895, the year of his death, Engels highlighted The Communist Manifesto's emphasis on winning as a first step the "battle of democracy."

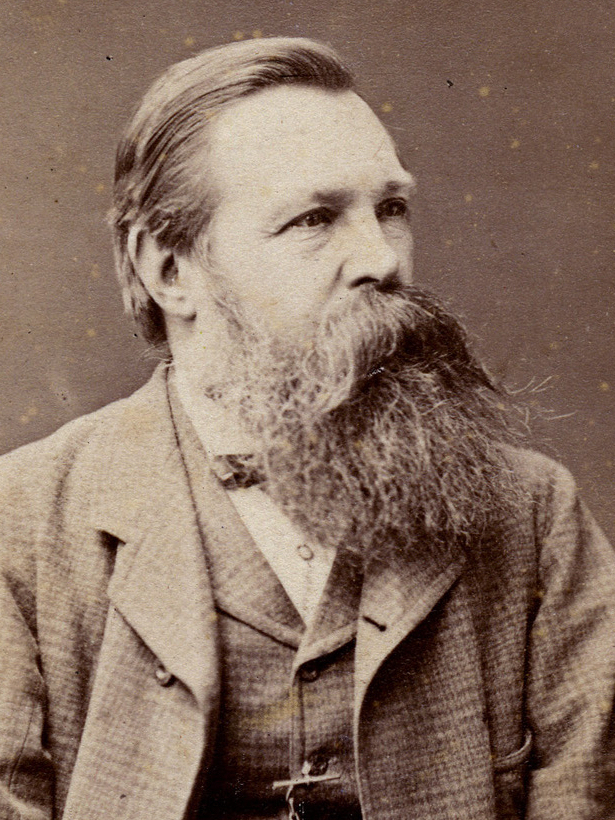
Friedrich Engels, a Marxist socialist who attempted to bring closer reformists and revolutionaries

In his introduction to the 1895 edition of Karl Marx's The Class Struggles in France, Engels attempted to resolve the division between gradualist reformist and revolutionary socialists in the Marxist movement by declaring that he was in favour of short-term tactics of electoral politics that included gradualist and evolutionary socialist policies while maintaining his belief that revolutionary seizure of power by the proletariat should remain a key goal of the socialist movement. In spite of this attempt by Engels to merge gradualism and revolution, his effort only diluted the distinction of gradualism and revolution and had the effect of strengthening the position of the revisionists. Engels' statements in the French newspaper Le Figaro in which he argued that "revolution" and the "so-called socialist society" were not fixed concepts, but rather constantly changing social phenomena and said that this made "us [socialists] all evolutionists", increased the public perception that Engels was gravitating towards evolutionary socialism. Engels also wrote that it would be "suicidal" to talk about a revolutionary seizure of power at a time when the historical circumstances favoured a parliamentary road to power which he predicted could happen "as early as 1898."

Engels' stance of openly accepting gradualist, evolutionary and parliamentary tactics while claiming that the historical circumstances did not favour revolution caused confusion among political commentators and the public. Bernstein interpreted this as indicating that Engels was moving towards accepting parliamentary reformist and gradualist stances, but he ignored that Engels' stances were tactical as a response to the particular circumstances at that time and that Engels was still committed to revolutionary socialism. Engels was deeply distressed when he discovered that his introduction to a new edition of The Class Struggles in France had been edited by Bernstein and Karl Kautsky in a manner which left the impression that he had become a proponent of a peaceful road to socialism. On 1 April 1895, four months before his death, Engels responded to Kautsky:

I was amazed to see today in the Vorwärts an excerpt from my 'Introduction' that had been printed without my knowledge and tricked out in such a way as to present me as a peace-loving proponent of legality [at all costs]. Which is all the more reason why I should like it to appear in its entirety in the Neue Zeit in order that this disgraceful impression may be erased. I shall leave Liebknecht in no doubt as to what I think about it and the same applies to those who, irrespective of who they may be, gave him this opportunity of perverting my views and, what's more, without so much as a word to me about it.

==== Elsewhere ====
In Australia, the labourist and socialist movements were gaining traction and the Australian Labor Party (ALP) was formed in Barcaldine, Queensland in 1891 by striking pastoral workers. In 1889, a minority government led by the party was formed in Queensland, with Anderson Dawson as the Premier of Queensland, where it was founded and was in power for one week, becoming the world's first government led by democratic socialists. The ALP has been the main driving force for workers' rights and the welfare state in Australia, backed by Australian trade unions, in particular the Australian Workers' Union.

Brazil’s First Socialist Congress occurred in Rio de Janeiro in 1902. Later that year, in São Paulo, another Socialist Congress took place and the Workers' Socialist Party (Partido Operário Socialista) was founded, considered to be the first socialist party in Brazil. In 1895, the Socialist Workers Party (Partido Socialista Operário) was founded. That same year, Silvério Fontes, considered the first Brazilian Marxist, launched the Socialist Center of Santos, which soon published the socialist magazine A Questão Social (The Social Question) and newspaper O Socialista (The Socialist).

== Early 20th century ==
=== Early democratic success and development ===
In Argentina, the Socialist Party was established in the 1890s, being led by Juan B. Justo and Nicolás Repetto, among others, becoming the first mass party in the country and in Latin America. The party affiliated itself with the Second International. Between 1924 and 1940, it was one of the many socialist party members of the Labour and Socialist International (LSI), the forerunner of the present-day Socialist International.

In 1904, Australians elected Chris Watson as the first Prime Minister from the Australian Labor Party, becoming the first democratic socialist elected into office. The British Labour Party first won seats in the House of Commons in 1902.

The French Socialist Party (PSF) was founded in 1902. The PSF came from the merger of the possibilist Federation of the Socialist Workers of France (FTSF), Jean Allemane's Revolutionary Socialist Workers' Party (POSR) and some independent socialist politicians like Jean Jaurès, who went on to become the party leader. Unlike the Socialist Party of France led by Jules Guesde, the PSF supported the principle of the alliance with the non-socialist left in the Bloc des gauches. Under pressure from the Second International, the two parties merged into the French Section of the Workers' International in 1905.

Other socialist parties from around the world who were beginning to gain importance in their national politics in the early 20th century included the Italian Socialist Party, the Spanish Socialist Workers' Party, the Swedish Social Democratic Party, the Russian Social Democratic Labour Party, the Socialist Party of America and the Chilean Socialist Workers' Party.

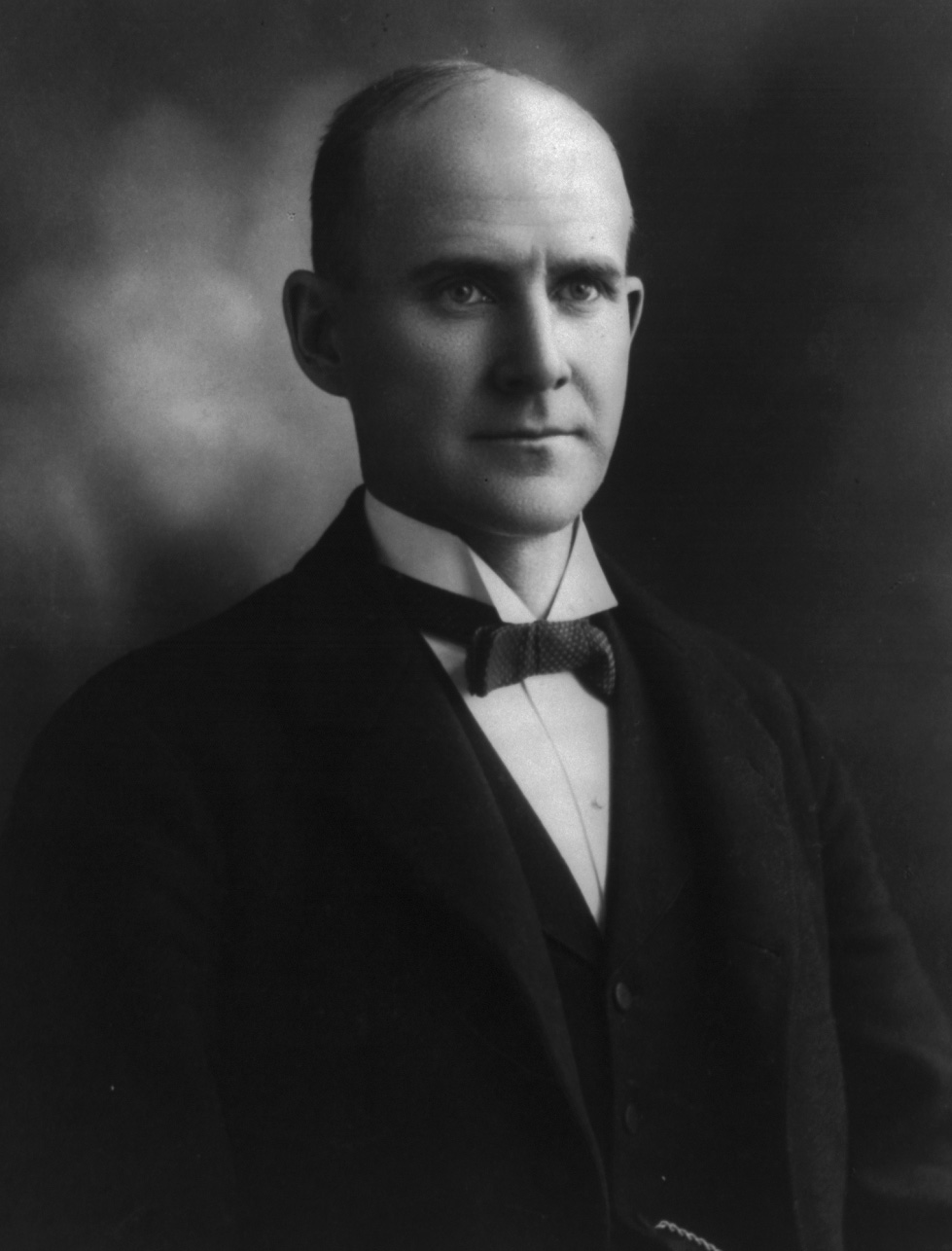
Eugene V. Debs, leader and presidential candidate in the early 20th century for the Socialist Party of America

The socialist industrial unionism of Daniel De Leon in the United States represented another strain of early democratic socialism in this period. It favoured a form of government based on industrial unions, but it also sought to establish a socialist government after winning at the ballot box. Democratic socialism continued to flourish in the Socialist Party of America, especially under the leadership of Norman Thomas. The Socialist Party of America was formed in 1901 after a merger between the three-year-old Social Democratic Party of America and disaffected elements of the Socialist Labor Party of America which had split from the main organisation in 1899. The Socialist Party of America was also known at various times in its long history as the Socialist Party of the United States (as early as the 1910s) and Socialist Party USA (as early as 1935, most common in the 1960s), but the official party name remained Socialist Party of America. Eugene V. Debs twice won over 900,000 votes in the 1912 presidential elections and increased his portion of the popular vote to over 1,000,000 in the 1920 presidential election despite being imprisoned for alleged sedition. The Socialist Party of America also elected two Representatives (Victor L. Berger and Meyer London), dozens of state legislators, more than hundred mayors and countless minor officials. Furthermore, the city of Milwaukee has been led by a series of democratic socialist mayors in the early 20th century, namely Frank Zeidler, Emil Seidel and Daniel Hoan.

=== Russian Revolution and aftermath ===
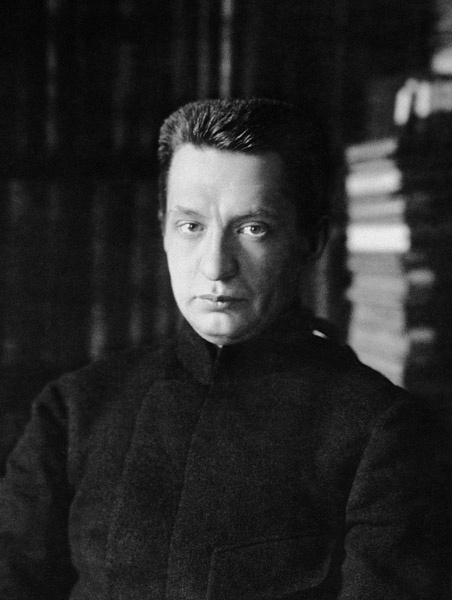
Alexander Kerensky, a moderate democratic socialist who led the Russian Provisional Government

In February 1917, revolution broke out in Russia in which workers, soldiers and peasants established soviets, the monarchy was forced into exile fell and a provisional government was formed until the election of a constituent assembly. Alexander Kerensky, a Russian lawyer and revolutionary, became a key political figure in the Russian Revolution of 1917. After the February Revolution, Kerensky joined the newly formed Russian Provisional Government, first as Minister of Justice, then as Minister of War and after July as the government's second Minister-Chairman. A leader of the moderate socialist Trudovik faction of the Socialist Revolutionary Party known as the Labour Group, Kerensky was also the vice-chairman of the powerful Petrograd Soviet. After failing to sign a peace treaty with the German Empire to exit from World War I which led to massive popular unrest against the government cabinet, Kerensky's government was overthrown on 7 November by the Bolsheviks led by Vladimir Lenin in the October Revolution. Soon after the October Revolution, the Russian Constituent Assembly elected Socialist-Revolutionary leader Victor Chernov as President of a Russian Republic, but it rejected the Bolshevik proposal that endorsed the Soviet decrees on land, peace and workers' control and acknowledged the power of the Soviets of Workers', Soldiers' and Peasants' Deputies.

As a result of the 1917 Russian Constituent Assembly election which saw a landslide victory for the Socialist-Revolutionaries, the Bolsheviks declared on the next day that the assembly was elected based on outdated party lists which did not reflect the Socialist Revolutionary Party split into Left and Right Socialist-Revolutionary factions. The Left Socialist-Revolutionaries were allied with the Bolsheviks. The All-Russian Central Executive Committee of the Soviets promptly dissolved the Russian Constituent Assembly.

The International Socialist Commission (ISC) was formed in February 1919 at a meeting in Bern, Switzerland by parties that wanted to resurrect the Second International. At a conference held on 27 February 1921 in Vienna, parties which did not want to be a part of the Communist International or the resurrected Second International formed the International Working Union of Socialist Parties (IWUSP). The ISC and the IWUSP eventually joined to form the LSI in May 1923 at a meeting held Hamburg.

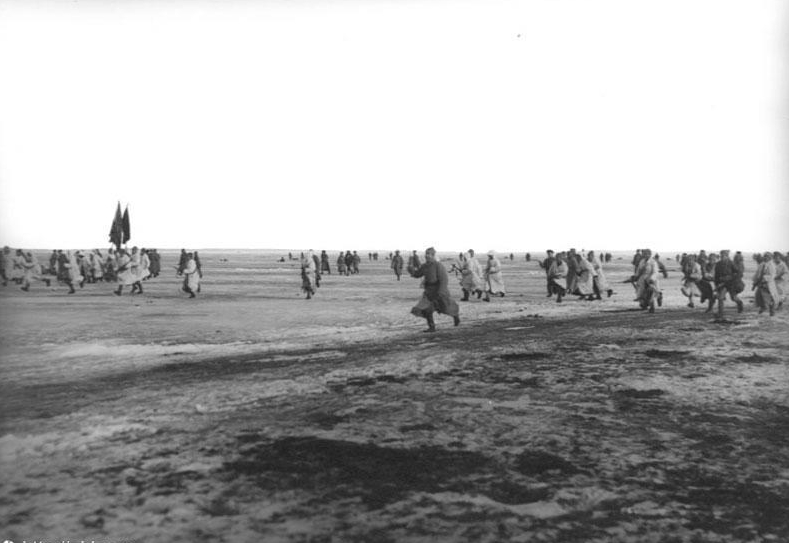
The Kronstadt rebellion represented the highest point of left-wing uprisings against the Bolsheviks

Left-wing groups which did not agree to the centralisation and abandonment of the soviets by the Bolshevik Party led left-wing uprisings against the Bolsheviks. Such groups included anarchists, Left Socialist-Revolutionaries, Mensheviks and Socialist-Revolutionaries. Amidst this left-wing discontent, the most large-scale events were the workers' Kronstadt rebellion and the anarchist-led Makhnovshchina in Ukraine.

In 1922, the 4th World Congress of the Communist International took up the policy of the united front, urging Communists to work with rank and file social democrats while remaining critical of their party leaders, whom they criticised for betraying the working class by supporting the war efforts of their respective capitalist classes. For their part, the social democrats pointed to the dislocation and chaos caused by revolution and later the growing authoritarianism of the Communist parties after they achieved power. When the Communist Party of Great Britain applied to affiliate with the Labour Party in 1920, it was turned down. On seeing the Soviet Union's growing coercive power in 1923, a dying Lenin stated that Russia had reverted to a "bourgeois tsarist machine ... barely varnished with socialism." After Lenin's death in January 1924, the Communist Party of the Soviet Union, increasingly falling under the control of Joseph Stalin, rejected the theory that socialism could not be built solely in the Soviet Union in favour of the concept of socialism in one country.

In other parts of Europe, many democratic socialist parties were united in the IWUSP in the early 1920s and in the London Bureau in the 1930s, along with many other socialists of different tendencies and ideologies. These socialist internationals sought to steer a centrist course between the revolutionaries and the social democrats of the Second International and the perceived anti-democratic Communist International. In contrast, the social democrats of the Second International were seen as insufficiently socialist and had been compromised by their support for World War I. The key movements within the IWUSP were the Austromarxists and the British Independent Labour Party.

In the early 1920s, the guild socialism of G. D. H. Cole attempted to envision a socialist alternative to Soviet-style authoritarianism, while council communism articulated democratic socialist positions in several respects, notably through renouncing the vanguard role of the revolutionary party and holding that the system of the Soviet Union was not authentically socialist.

The Congress Socialist Party (CSP) was a socialist caucus within the Indian National Congress. It was founded in 1934 by Congress members who rejected what they saw as the anti-rational mysticism of Gandhi as well as the sectarian attitude of the Communist Party of India towards the Congress. Influenced by Fabianism as well as Marxism-Leninism, the CSP included advocates of armed struggle or sabotage (such as Yusuf Meherally, Jayaprakash Narayan, and Basawon Singh (Sinha) as well as those who insisted upon Ahimsa or Nonviolent resistance (such as Acharya Narendra Deva). The CSP advocated decentralized socialism in which co-operatives, trade unions, independent farmers, and local authorities would hold a substantial share of the economic power.

=== 1930s and WWII ===
Democratic socialism advanced in many industrial democracies in the 1930s, appealing to workers suffering as a result of the Great Depression. In Britain's general election of 1929 the Labour Party won 288 seats out of 615 and formed a minority government. The Great Depression of that period brought high unemployment and Labour Prime Minister Ramsay MacDonald sought to make cuts in order to balance the budget. The trade unions opposed MacDonald's proposed cuts and he split the Labour government to form the National Government of 1931. This experience moved the Labour Party leftward. The Independent Labour Party (ILP) remained outside the Labour Party, although remained affiliated to it. It promoted a "Socialism in our time" platform centred around a living wage and nationalisation. As the Depression deepened, it became increasingly dissatisfied with Labour's gradualism, and disaffiliated in 1932, after which its membership declined and it suffered from a series of splinters. Also in 1932, the ILP co-founded the London Bureau of left-socialist parties, later called the International Revolutionary Marxist Centre or "Three-and-a-Half International", administered by the ILP and chaired by its leader, Fenner Brockway, for most of its existence; the main forces in the London Bureau were the ILP and Spain's Workers' Party of Marxist Unification (POUM).

In France, the French Section of the Workers' International (SFIO) was pulled between right-wing factions promoting a more top-down planned economy (Neosocialism, Nonconformism and left-wing factions urging more revolutionary solutions (Bataille socialiste and Marceau Pivert's Gauche révolutionnaire). The party entered into [[Cartel des Gauches|alliance]] with groups to its right, who formed a coalition government in 1932. In Canada, the Co-operative Commonwealth Federation (CCF) was founded in 1932 as an agrarian socialist party. Its first platform was the Regina Manifesto, adopted in 1930. The CCF gained popularity among industrial workers throughout the 1930s. In 1944, the Saskatchewan wing of the party formed the first Socialist government in a Canadian province and stayed in power until 1964.

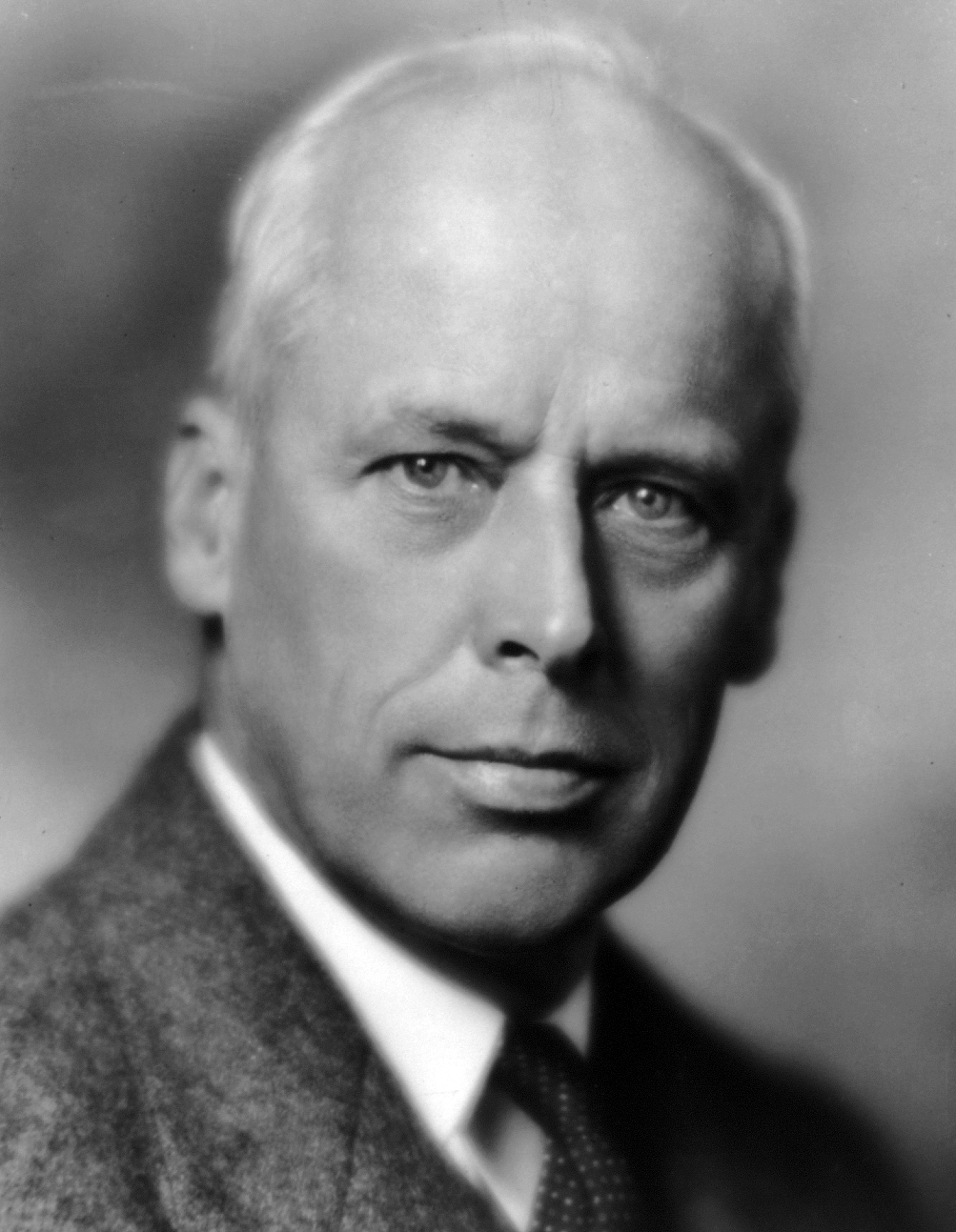
Norman Thomas, six-time presidential candidate for the Socialist Party of America

In the United States, the New Deal liberalism of President Franklin D. Roosevelt won mass support leaving socialists unable to gain significant ground. Norman Thomas of the Socialist Party of America (SPA) attracted nearly 188,000 votes in his 1936 run for president, but performed poorly in historic strongholds of the party and the Socialist Party of America's membership had begun to decline. Meanwhile, the Trotskyist movement, followed a policy known as the French Turn, a strategy of entryism in democratic socialist parties such as the SPA, SFIO and ILP, pulling these to the left in some places.

However, fascism was also advancing. In Germany, it was the fascists of Adolf Hitler's Nazi Party who successfully exploited the Depression to win power, in January 1933. Hitler's regime swiftly destroyed both the German Communist Party and the Social Democratic Party, the worst blow the world socialist movement had ever suffered. This forced Stalin to reassess his strategy, and after its 7th World Congress in 1935 the Comintern began urging a popular front against fascism. The socialist parties were at first suspicious, given the bitter hostility of the 1920s, but eventually effective Popular Fronts were formed in both France and Spain. In Italy, the Italian Socialist Party (PSI) established an alliance with the Communists and it gradually cooperated with conservative reformists, revolutionaries, and syndicalists. In France, the Popular Front, headed by the SFIO's Léon Blum, won the 3 May 1936 election, leading to a government composed of Radical and Socialist ministers. On 8 June 1936, the Matignon Accords granted the 40 hours workweek to the workers, as well as right of collective bargaining, right of strike action, and dismantled all laws preventing organization of trade-unions.

Elsewhere, democratic socialists remained hostile to Stalinism and rejected the popular front strategy. For example, the Communist Party leader Earl Russell Browder offered to be Thomas' running mate on a joint Socialist Party–Communist Party ticket, but Thomas rejected this overture.

After the election of a Popular Front government in Spain in 1936 a fascist military revolt led to the Spanish Civil War. Democratic socialists from around the world fought on the side of the Republican government, for instance in the ILP Contingent of the International Brigades, in which George Orwell served.

The crisis in Spain also brought down Blum's Popular Front government in France and ultimately the Popular Fronts were not able to prevent the spread of fascism or the aggressive plans of the fascist powers.

== Mid-20th century ==
=== Post-war governments ===
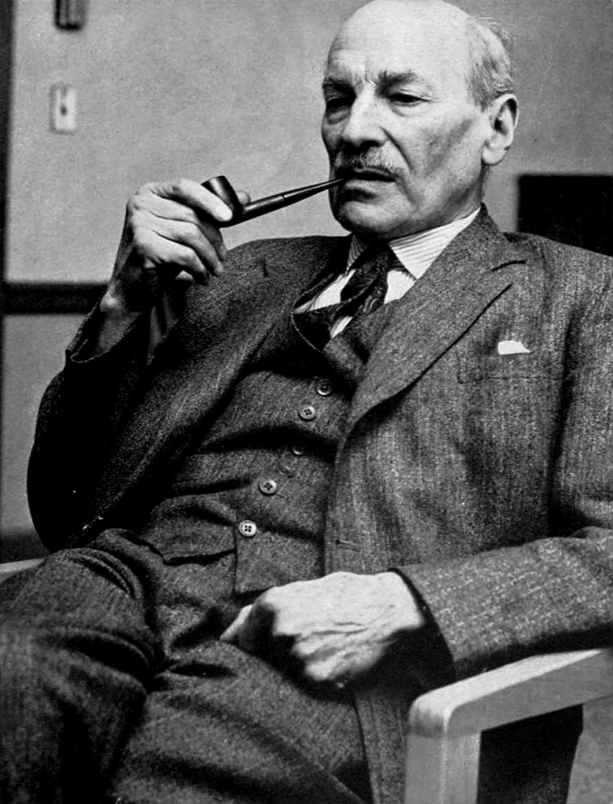
Clement Attlee, Labour Prime Minister of the United Kingdom

After World War II, democratic socialist, labourist and social-democratic governments introduced social reforms and wealth redistribution via welfare state social programmes and progressive taxation. Those parties dominated post-war politics in the Nordic countries and countries such as Belgium, Czechoslovakia, France, Italy and the United Kingdom. At one point, France claimed the world's most state-controlled capitalist country, starting a period of unprecedented economic growth known as the Trente Glorieuses, part of the post-war economic boom set in motion by the Keynesian consensus. The public utilities and industries nationalised by the French government included Air France, the Bank of France, Charbonnages de France, Électricité de France, Gaz de France and Régie Nationale des Usines Renault. Outside Europe, the Japan Socialist Party was briefly in power in 1947.

In 1945, the British Labour Party led by Clement Attlee was elected to office based on a radical, democratic socialist programme. The Labour government nationalised major public utilities and industries such as mining, gas, coal, electricity, rail, iron, steel and the Bank of England. BP was nationalised in 1951. In 1956, Anthony Crosland stated that at least 25% of British industry was nationalised and that public employees, including those in nationalised industries, constituted a similar proportion of the country's total workforce. The 1964–1970 and 1974–1979 Labour governments strengthened the policy of nationalisation. These Labour governments renationalised steel (British Steel) in 1967 after the Conservatives had privatised it and nationalised car production (British Leyland) in 1976. The 1945–1951 Labour government also established National Health Service which provided taxpayer-funded health care to Every British citizen, free at the point of use. High-quality housing for the working class was provided in council housing estates and university education became available to every citizen via a school grant system. The 1945–1951 Labour government has been described as being transformative democratic socialist.

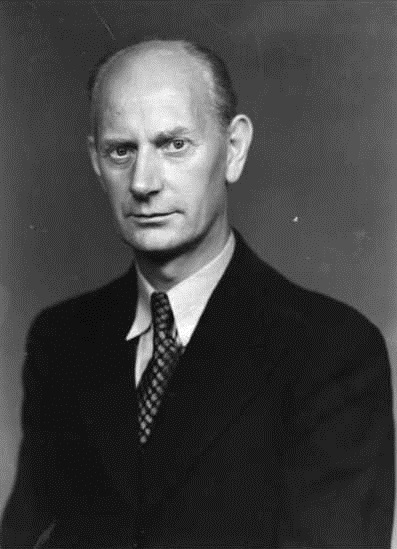
Einar Gerhardsen, Labour Prime Minister of Norway

During most of the post-war era, democratic socialist, labourist and social-democratic parties dominated the political scene and laid the ground to universalistic welfare states in the Nordic countries. For much of the mid- and late 20th century, Sweden was governed by the Swedish Social Democratic Party largely in cooperation with trade unions and industry. Tage Erlander was the leader of the Social Democratic Party and led the government from 1946 until 1969, an uninterrupted tenure of twenty-three years, one of the longest in any democracy. From 1945 until 1962, the Norwegian Labour Party held an absolute majority in the parliament led by Einar Gerhardsen, who served Prime Minister for seventeen years. The Danish Social Democrats governed Denmark for most of the 20th century and since the 1920s and through the 1940s and the 1970s a large majority of Prime Ministers were members of the Social Democrats, the largest and most popular political party in Denmark.

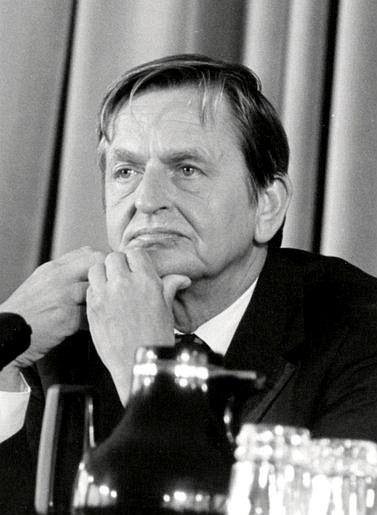
Olof Palme, Social Democratic Prime Minister of Sweden

This particular adaptation of the mixed economy, better known as the Nordic model, is characterised by more generous welfare states (relative to other developed countries) which are aimed specifically at enhancing individual autonomy, ensuring the universal provision of basic human rights and stabilising the economy. It is distinguished from other welfare states with similar goals by its emphasis on maximising labour force participation, promoting gender equality, egalitarian and extensive benefit levels, large magnitude of redistribution and expansionary fiscal policy. In the 1950s, popular socialism emerged as a vital current of the left in Nordic countries could be characterised as a democratic socialism in the same vein as it placed itself between communism and social democracy. In the 1960s, Gerhardsen established a planning agency and tried to establish a planned economy. Prominent Swedish Prime Minister Olof Palme identified himself as a democratic socialist.

The Rehn–Meidner model was adopted by the Swedish Social Democratic Party in the late 1940s. This economic model allowed capitalists who owned very productive and efficient firms to retain excess profits at the expense of the firm's workers, exacerbating income inequality and causing workers in these firms to agitate for a better share of the profits in the 1970s. Women working in the state sector also began to assert pressure for better and equal wages. In 1976, economist Rudolf Meidner established a study committee that came up with a proposal called the Meidner Plan which entailed the transferring of the excess profits into investment funds controlled by the workers in said efficient firms, with the goal that firms would create further employment and pay workers higher wages in return rather than unduly increasing the wealth of company owners and managers. Capitalists immediately denounced the proposal as socialism and launched an unprecedented opposition and smear campaign against it, threatening to terminate the class compromise established in the 1938 Saltsjöbaden Agreement.

=== Anti-colonialism and revolutions ===
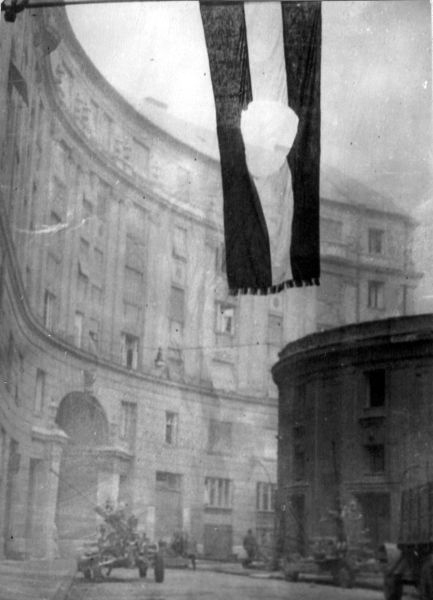
The Hungarian Revolution of 1956 represented a breaking point in the wider socialist movement

The Hungarian Revolution of 1956 was a spontaneous nationwide revolt by democratic socialists against the Marxist–Leninist government of the People's Republic of Hungary and its policies of repression, lasting from 23 October until 10 November 1956. Soviet leader Nikita Khrushchev's denunciation of the excesses of Stalin's regime during the 20th Congress of the Communist Party of the Soviet Union that same year as well as the revolt in Hungary produced ideological fractures and disagreements within the democratic communist and socialist parties of Western Europe. A split ensued within the Italian Communist Party (PCI), with most ordinary members and the PCI leadership, including Giorgio Napolitano and Palmiro Togliatti, regarding the Hungarian insurgents as counter-revolutionaries as reported in l'Unità, the official PCI newspaper.

Giuseppe Di Vittorio, General Secretary of the Italian General Confederation of Labour, repudiated the leadership position, as did the prominent party members Loris Fortuna, Antonio Giolitti and many other influential communist intellectuals who later were expelled or left the party. Pietro Nenni, the national secretary of the Italian Socialist Party, a close ally of the PCI, opposed the Soviet intervention as well. Napolitano, elected in 2006 as President of the Italian Republic, wrote in his 2005 political autobiography that he regretted his justification of Soviet action in Hungary and that at the time he believed in party unity and the international leadership of Soviet communism.

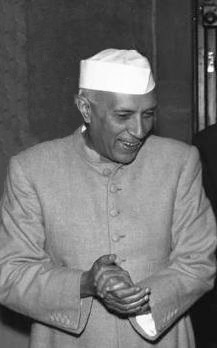
Jawaharlal Nehru, a prominent Third World socialist leader and Prime Minister of India from the Indian National Congress

Within the Communist Party of Great Britain, dissent that began with the repudiation of Stalin by John Saville and E. P. Thompson, influential historians and members of the Communist Party Historians Group, culminated in a loss of thousands of party members as events unfolded in Hungary. Peter Fryer, correspondent for the party newspaper The Daily Worker, reported on the violent suppression of the uprising, but his dispatches were heavily censored. Fryer resigned from the paper upon his return and was later expelled from the party. In France, moderates such as historian Emmanuel Le Roy Ladurie resigned, questioning the policy of supporting Soviet actions by the French Communist Party. The French anarchist philosopher and writer Albert Camus wrote an open letter titled The Blood of the Hungarians, criticising the West's lack of action. Jean-Paul Sartre, still a determined party member, criticised the Soviets.

In the post-war years, socialism became increasingly influential throughout the so-called Third World after decolonisation. During India's freedom movement and fight for independence, many figures in the leftist faction of the Indian National Congress organised themselves as the Congress Socialist Party. Their politics and those of the early and intermediate periods of Jayaprakash Narayan's career combined a commitment to the socialist transformation of society with a principled opposition to the one-party authoritarianism they perceived in the Stalinist model. In Africa, many independence movements (e.g. in Senegal, under the leadership of Léopold Sédar Senghor, in Ghana under the leadership of Kwame Nkrumah, in Guinea under Ahmed Sékou Touré and in Tanzania, under the leadership of Julius Nyerere, who developed the concept of Ujamaa, co-operative economoics) were heavily influenced by democratic socialism, although often drifting away from democracy after taking power.

Embracing a new ideology called Third World socialism, countries in Africa, Asia and Latin America often nationalised industries held by foreign owners. In addition, the New Left, a movement composed of activists, educators, agitators and others who sought to implement a broad range of social reforms on issues such as gay rights, abortion, gender roles and drugs, in contrast to earlier leftist or Marxist movements that had taken a more vanguardist approach to social justice and focused mostly on labour unionisation and issues related to class, became prominent in the 1960s and 1970s. The New Left rejected involvement with the labour movement and Marxism's historical theory of class struggle.

=== The 1960s and the New Left ===
In the United States, the New Left was associated with the anti-war and hippie movements as well as the black liberation movements such as the Black Panther Party. While initially formed in opposition to the so-called Old Left of the Democratic Party, groups composing the New Left gradually became central players in the Democratic coalition, culminating in the nomination of the outspoken anti-Vietnam War George McGovern at the Democratic Party primaries for the 1972 United States presidential election. US civil rights leader Martin Luther King Jr. supported the ideals of democratic socialism, although he was reluctant to speak directly of this support due to the anti-communist sentiment being projected throughout the United States at the time, and the association of socialism with communism. King believed that capitalism could not adequately provide the necessities of many American people, particularly the African-American community. King expressed that "the evils of capitalism are as real as the evils of militarism and evils of racism".

The protest wave of 1968 represented a worldwide escalation of social conflicts, predominantly characterised by popular rebellions against military dictatorships, capitalists and bureaucratic elites, who responded with an escalation of political repression and authoritarianism. These protests marked a turning point for the civil rights movement in the United States which produced revolutionary movements like the Black Panther Party. The prominent civil rights leader Martin Luther King Jr. organised the Poor People's Campaign to address issues of economic and social justice while personally showing sympathy with democratic socialism. The classic Port Huron Statement of the Students for a Democratic Society combined a stringent critique of the Stalinist model with calls for a democratic socialist reconstruction of society.

In reaction to the Tet Offensive, protests also sparked a broad movement in opposition to the Vietnam War all over the United States and even into London, Paris, Berlin and Rome. Mass socialist or communist movements grew not only in the United States, but also in most European countries. The most spectacular manifestation of this was the May 1968 protests in France in which students linked up with strikes of up to ten million workers and the movement seemed capable of overthrowing the government, albeit for only a few days. In many other capitalist countries, struggles against dictatorships, state repression and colonisation were also marked by protests in 1968 such as the beginning of the Troubles in Northern Ireland, the Tlatelolco massacre in Mexico City and the escalation of guerrilla warfare against the military dictatorship in Brazil. Countries governed by Marxist–Leninist parties had protests against bureaucratic and military elites. In Eastern Europe, there were widespread protests that escalated particularly in the Prague Spring in Czechoslovakia. In response, the Soviet Union occupied Czechoslovakia, but the occupation was denounced by the Italian and French communist parties as well as the Communist Party of Finland.

== Late 20th century ==
=== Neoliberal counterrevolution and end of Cold War ===
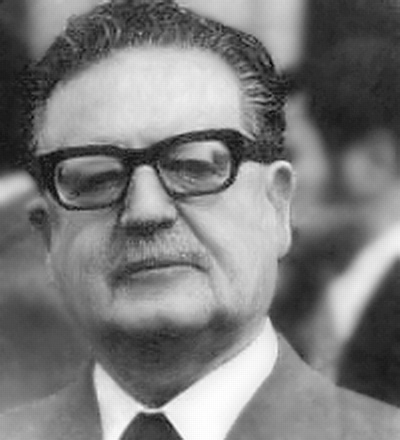
Salvador Allende, President of Chile and member of the Socialist Party of Chile, whose presidency and life were ended by a CIA-backed military coup

In Latin America, liberation theology is a socialist tendency within the Roman Catholic Church that emerged in the 1960s. In Chile, Salvador Allende, a physician and candidate for the Socialist Party of Chile, became the first democratically elected Marxist President after presidential elections were held in 1970. However, his government was ousted three years later in a military coup backed by the CIA and the United States government, instituting the right-wing dictatorship of Augusto Pinochet which lasted until the late 1980s. In addition, Michael Manley, a self-described democratic socialist, served as the fourth Prime Minister of Jamaica from 1972 to 1980 and from 1989 to 1992. According to opinion polls, he remains one of Jamaica's most popular Prime Ministers since independence.

Eurocommunism became a trend in the 1970s and 1980s in various Western European communist parties which intended to develop a modernised theory and practice of social transformation that was more relevant for a Western European country and less aligned to the influence or control of the Communist Party of the Soviet Union. Outside of Western Europe, it is sometimes referred to as neocommunism. Some communist parties with strong popular support, notably the Italian Communist Party and the Communist Party of Spain, enthusiastically adopted Eurocommunism and the Communist Party of Finland was dominated by Eurocommunists.

In the late 1970s and in the 1980s, the Socialist International had extensive contacts and held discussion with the two powers of the Cold War, the United States and the Soviet Union, regarding the relations between the East and West, along with arms control. Since then, the Socialist International has admitted as member parties the Nicaraguan Sandinista National Liberation Front and the left-wing Puerto Rican Independence Party as well as former communist parties such as the Italian Democratic Party of the Left and the Front for the Liberation of Mozambique. The Socialist International aided social democratic parties in re-establishing themselves after right-wing dictatorships were toppled in Portugal and Spain, respectively in 1974 and 1975. Until its 1976 congress in Geneva, the Socialist International had few members outside Europe and no formal involvement with Latin America.

In the United States, the Social Democrats, USA, an association of reformist social democrats and democratic socialists, was founded in 1972. The Socialist Party of America had stopped running independent presidential candidates and begun reforming itself towards democratic socialism. Consequently, the party's name was changed because it had confused the public. With the name change in place, the Social Democrats, USA clarified its vision to Americans who confused democratic socialism with Marxism–Leninism, harshly opposed by the organisation. In 1983, the Democratic Socialists of America was founded as a merger of the Democratic Socialist Organizing Committee with the New American Movement, an organization of New Left veterans. Earlier in 1973, Michael Harrington and Irving Howe formed the Democratic Socialist Organizing Committee which articulated a democratic socialist message while a smaller faction associated with peace activist David McReynolds formed the Socialist Party USA. Harrington and the socialist-feminist author Barbara Ehrenreich were elected as the first co-chairs of the organisation which does not stand its own candidates in elections and instead "fights for reforms ... that will weaken the power of corporations and increase the power of working people."

In Greece, the Panhellenic Socialist Movement, better known as PASOK, was founded on 3 September 1974 by Andreas Papandreou as a democratic socialist, left-wing nationalist, Venizelist and social democratic party following the collapse of the military dictatorship of 1967–1974. As a result of the 1981 legislative election, PASOK became Greece's first centre-left party to win a majority in the Hellenic Parliament and the party would later pass several important economic and social reforms that would reshape Greece in the years ahead until its collapse in the 2010s.

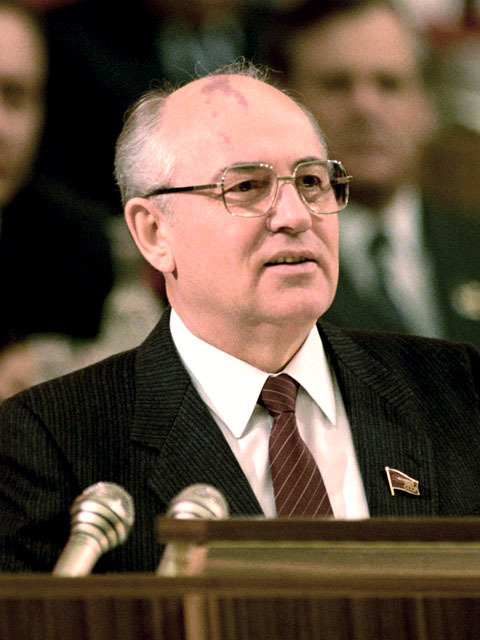
Mikhail Gorbachev, General Secretary of the Communist Party of the Soviet Union, who wanted to move the Soviet Union towards social democracy

During the 1980s, Soviet leader Mikhail Gorbachev intended to move the Soviet Union towards Nordic-style social democracy, calling it a "socialist beacon for all mankind."

=== Opposition to neoliberalism and Third Way ===
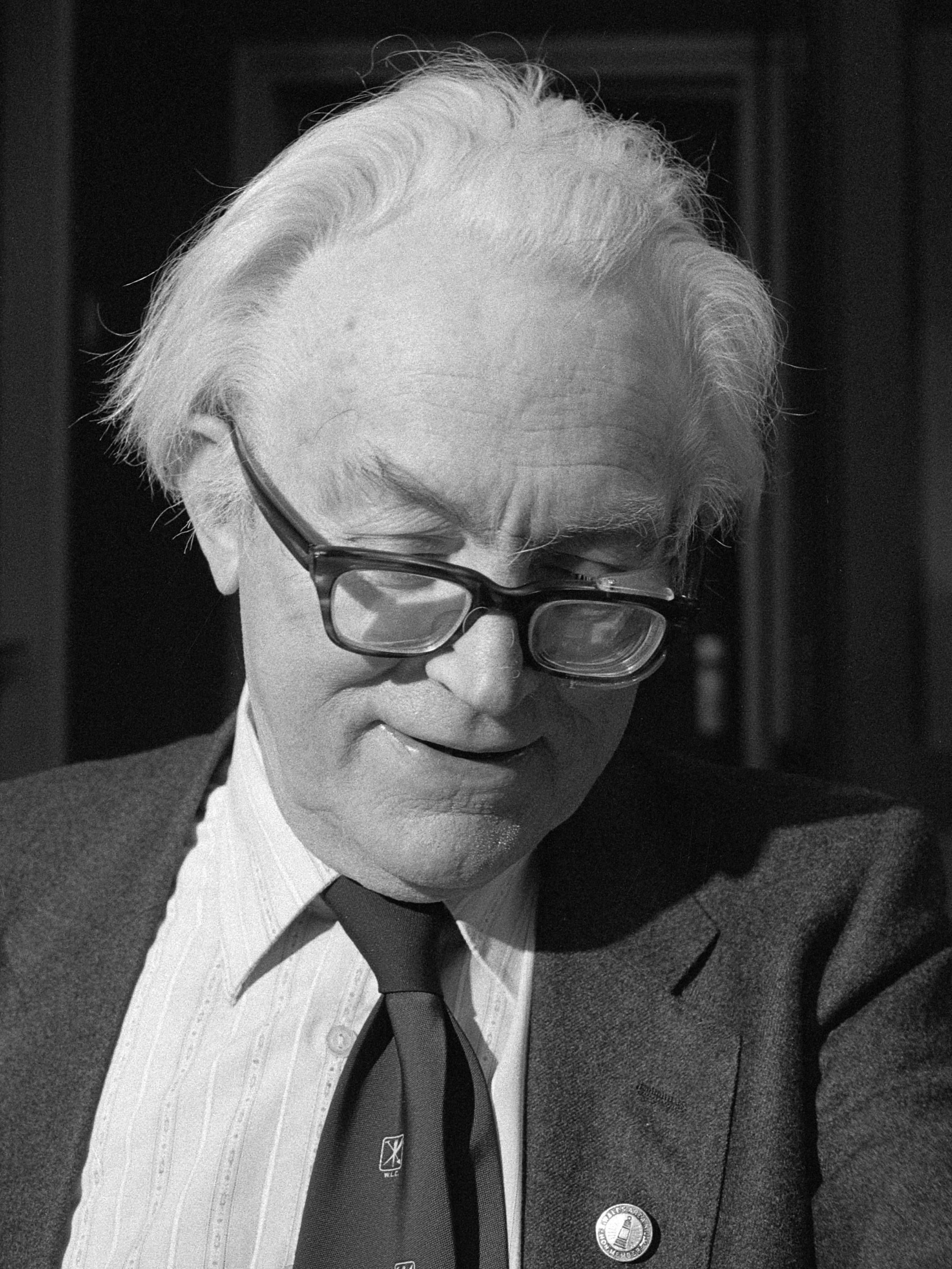
Michael Foot, former Leader of the Labour Party

Many social-democratic parties, particularly after the Cold War, adopted neoliberal economic policies, including austerity, deregulation, financialisation, free trade, privatisation and welfare reforms such as workfare, experiencing a drastic decline in the 2010s after their successes in the 1990s and 2000s in a phenomenon known as Pasokification. As monetarists and neoliberals attacked social welfare systems as impediments to private entrepreneurship, prominent social-democratic parties abandoned their pursuit of moderate socialism in favour of economic liberalism. This resulted in the rise of more left-wing and democratic socialist parties that rejected neoliberalism and the Third Way. In the United Kingdom, prominent democratic socialists within the Labour Party such as Michael Foot and Tony Benn put forward democratic socialism into an actionable manifesto during the 1970s and 1980s, but this was voted overwhelmingly against in the 1983 general election after Margaret Thatcher's victory in the Falklands War and the manifesto was referred to as "the longest suicide note in history."

By the 1980s, with the rise of conservative neoliberal politicians such as Ronald Reagan in the United States, Margaret Thatcher in Britain, Brian Mulroney in Canada and Augusto Pinochet in Chile, the Western welfare state was attacked from within, but state support for the corporate sector was maintained. According to Kristen Ghodsee, the triumphalist attitudes of Western powers at the end of the Cold War and the fixation with linking all leftist and socialist ideals with the excesses of Stalinism allowed neoliberalism to fill the void. This undermined democratic institutions and reforms, leaving a trail of economic misery, unemployment, hopelessness and rising economic inequality throughout the former Eastern Bloc and much of the West in the following decades. With democracy weakened and the anti-capitalist left marginalised, the anger and resentment which followed the period of neoliberalism was channeled into extremist nationalist movements in both the former and the latter.

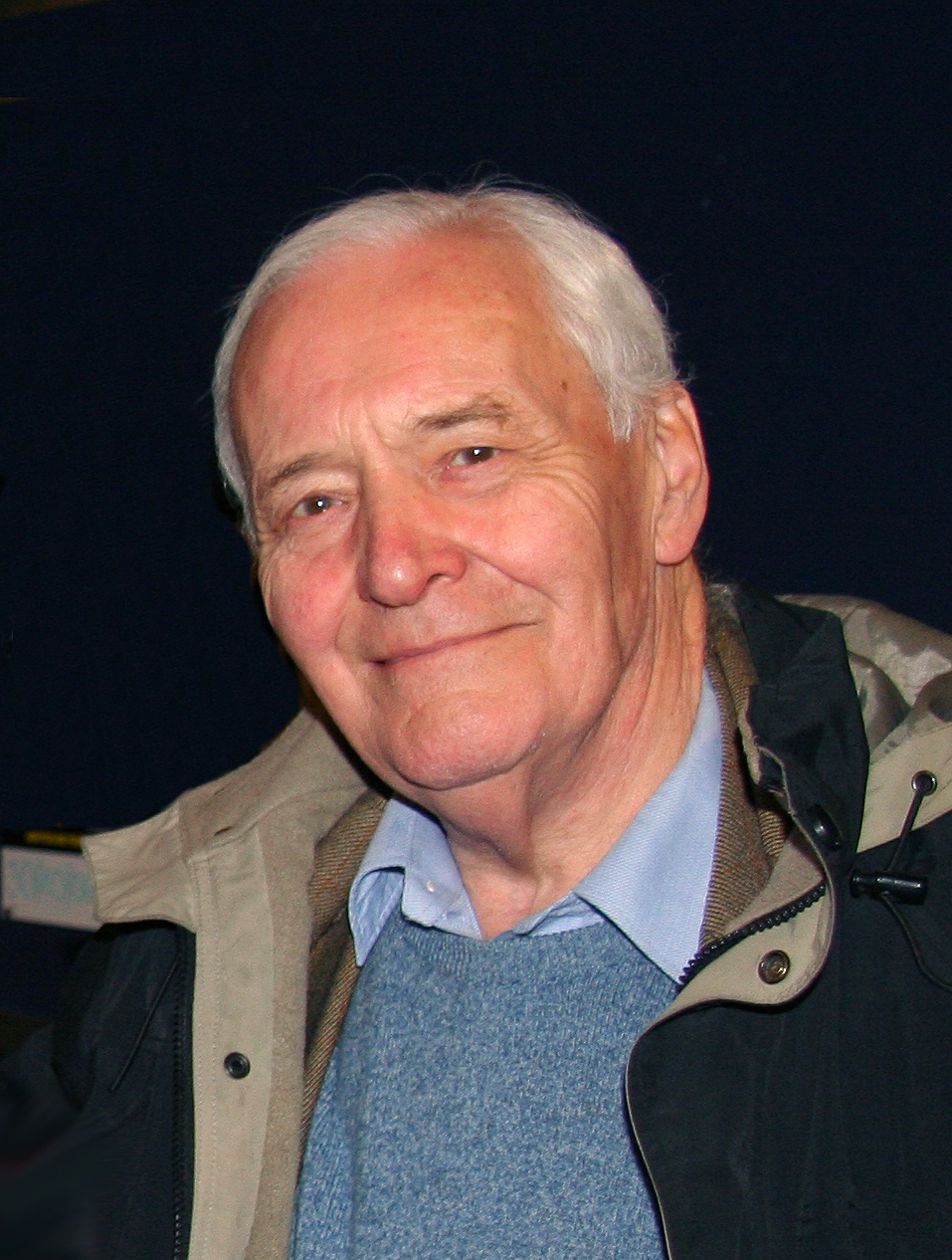
Tony Benn, a leading left-wing Labour Party politician

As a result of the party's shift, Labour Party leader Neil Kinnock made a public attack against the entryist group Militant at the 1985 Labour Party conference in Bournemouth. The Labour Party ruled that Militant was ineligible for affiliation with the Labour Party and the party gradually expelled Militant supporters. The Kinnock leadership had refused to support the 1984–1985 miner's strike over pit closures, a decision that the party's left-wing and the National Union of Mineworkers blamed for the strike's eventual defeat.

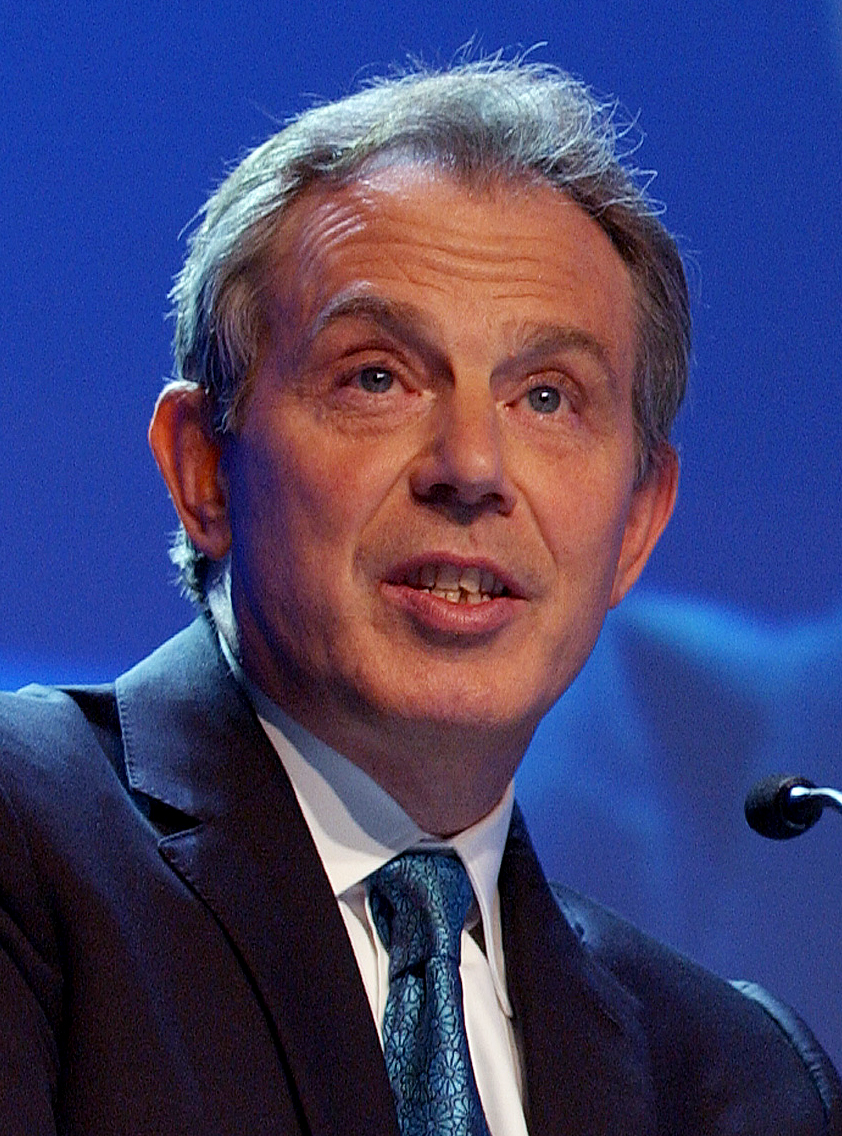
Tony Blair, whose Clause IV proposal included for the first time referring to Labour as democratic socialist, but whose critics disputed his socialist credentials

In 1989, the Socialist International adopted a new Declaration of Principles at its 18th congress in Stockholm, Sweden, stating: "Democratic socialism is an international movement for freedom, social justice, and solidarity. Its goal is to achieve a peaceful world where these basic values can be enhanced and where each individual can live a meaningful life with the full development of his or her personality and talents, and with the guarantee of human and civil rights in a democratic framework of society." Within the Labour Party, the democratic socialist label was used historically by those who identified with the tradition represented by the Independent Labour Party, the soft left of non-Marxist socialists such as Michael Foot around the Tribune magazine and some of the hard left in the Campaign Group around Tony Benn. The Campaign Group, along with the Socialist Society led by Raymond Williams and others, formed the Socialist Movement in 1987 which now produces the magazine Red Pepper.

In the late 1990s, the Labour Party under the leadership of Tony Blair enacted policies based on the liberal market economy with the intention of delivering public services via the private finance initiative. Influential in these policies was the idea of a Third Way which called for a re-evaluation and reduction of welfare state policies. In 1995, the Labour Party re-defined its position on socialism by re-wording Clause IV of their Constitution, effectively removing all references to public, direct worker or municipal ownership of the means of production and now reading: "The Labour Party is a democratic socialist party. It believes that, by the strength of our common endeavour we achieve more than we achieve alone, so as to create, for each of us, the means to realise our true potential, and, for all of us, a community in which power, wealth, and opportunity are in the hands of the many, not the few." New Labour eventually won the 1997 United Kingdom general election in a landslide and Blair described New Labour as a "left of centre party, pursuing economic prosperity and social justice as partners and not as opposites." It has been argued that the Labour Party under the Blair ministry effectively governed from the radical centre, something which Blair had promised to do in the 1997 general election.

== 21st century ==
The Progressive Alliance is a political international organisation founded on 22 May 2013 by left-wing political parties, the majority of which are current or former members of the Socialist International. The organisation states that its aim is becoming the global network of "the progressive, democratic, social-democratic, socialist and labour movement." On 30 November 2018, The Sanders Institute and the Democracy in Europe Movement 2025 founded the Progressive International, an international political organisation which unites democratic socialists with labour unionists, progressives and social democrats.

=== Africa ===
African socialism has been a major ideology around the continent and remains so in the present day. Although affiliated with the Socialist International, the African National Congress (ANC) in South Africa abandoned its socialist ideology after gaining power in 1994 and followed a neoliberal route. From 2005 until 2007, the country was wracked by thousands of protests from poor working-class communities. One of these gave rise to a mass democratic socialist movement of shack dwellers called Abahlali baseMjondolo which continues to work for popular people's planning and against the proliferation of capitalism in land and housing. In 2013, the National Union of Metalworkers of South Africa, the country's biggest trade union, voted to withdraw support from the AFC and the South African Communist Party and to form an independent socialist party to protect the interests of the working class, resulting in the creation of the United Front.

Other democratic socialist parties in Africa include the Movement of Socialist Democrats, the Congress for the Republic, the Movement of Socialist Democrats and the Democratic Patriots' Unified Party in Tunisia, the Berber Socialism and Revolution Party in Algeria, the Congress of Democrats in Namibia, the National Progressive Unionist Party, the Socialist Party of Egypt, the Workers and Peasants Party, the Workers Democratic Party, the Revolutionary Socialists and the Socialist Popular Alliance Party in Egypt and the Socialist Democratic Vanguard Party in Morocco. Democratic socialists played a major role in the Arab Spring of 2011, especially in Egypt and Tunisia.

=== Americas ===
==== North America ====
In North America, Canada and the United States represent an unusual case in the Western world in that they were not governed by a socialist party at the federal level. However, the democratic socialist Co-operative Commonwealth Federation (CCF), the precursor to the social democratic New Democratic Party (NDP), had significant success in provincial Canadian politics. In 1944, the Saskatchewan CCF formed the first socialist government in North America and its leader Tommy Douglas is known for having spearheaded the adoption of Canada's nationwide system of universal healthcare called Medicare. At the federal level, the NDP was the Official Opposition (2011–2015).

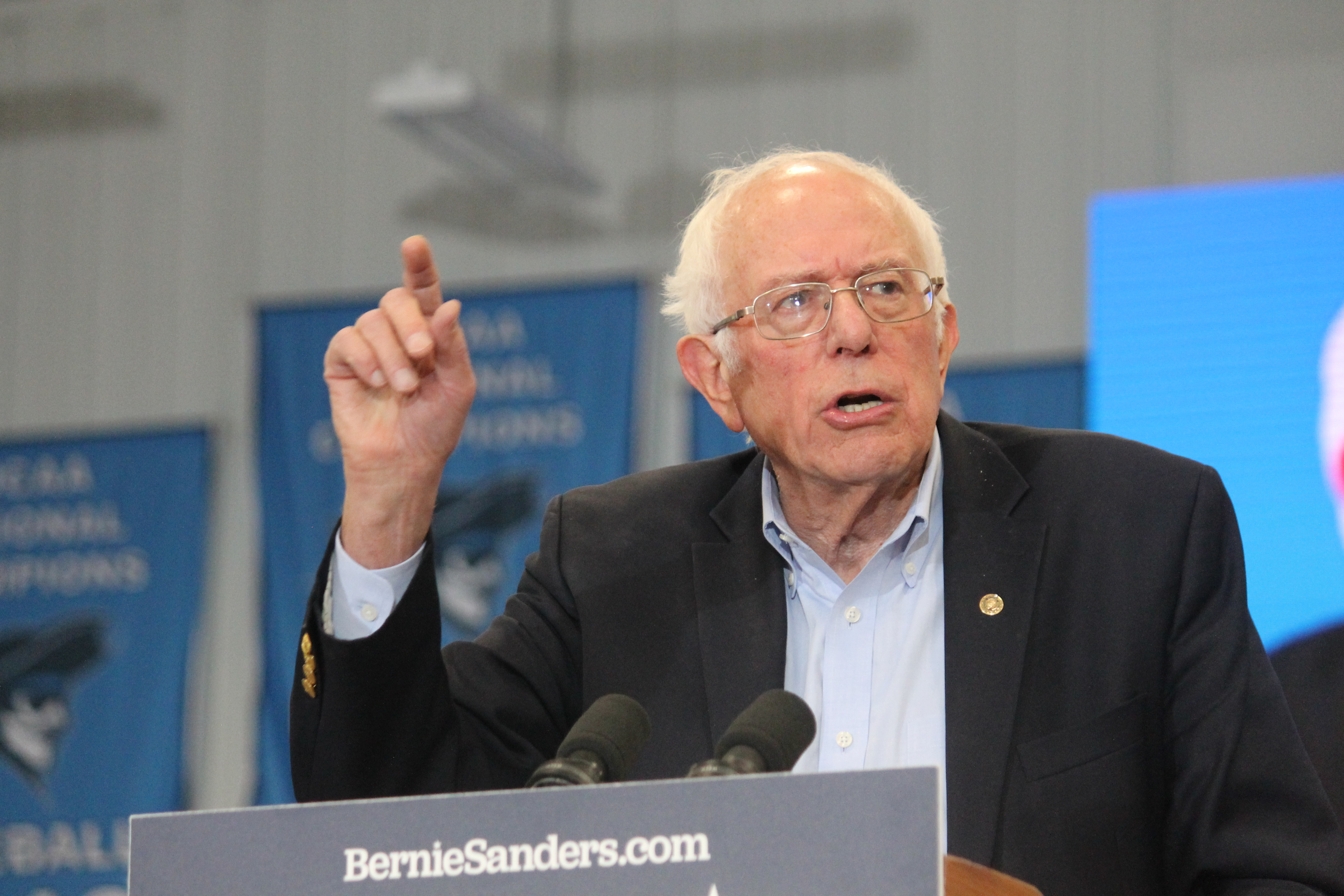
Senator Bernie Sanders, a self-described democratic socialist, whose presidential campaigns in 2016 and 2020 attracted significant support from youth and working-class groups while realigning the Democratic Party further left

While there have historically been other notable socialist members of Congress and other public offices in the United States, such as former House whip David Bonior, former New York City mayor David Dinkins, and the initial sponsor of the Medicare for All Act, John Conyers, it is widely held that Bernie Sanders was the first to bring democratic socialism into widespread popularity in the United States. Sanders, who was the 37th Mayor of Burlington and later a member of the United States House of Representatives, became the first self-described democratic socialist to be elected to the Senate from Vermont in 2006. In 2016, Sanders made a bid for the Democratic Party presidential candidate, thereby gathering considerable popular support and interest in his campaign and democratic socialism, particularly among the younger generation and the working class. Although the nomination ultimately went to centrist Hillary Clinton, Sanders ran again in the 2020 Democratic Party presidential primaries, briefly becoming the front-runner.

Since his praise of the Nordic model indicated focus on welfare programs as opposed to views involving social ownership, it has been argued that the term democratic socialism has become a misnomer for social democracy in American politics. Nonetheless, Sanders has explicitly advocated for some form of public ownership as well as workplace democracy, an expansion of worker cooperatives and the democratisation of the economy. Sanders' proposed legislation include worker-owned business, the Workplace Democracy Act, employee ownership as alternative to corporations and a package to encourage employee-owned companies. Sanders associates Franklin D. Roosevelt's New Deal and Lyndon B. Johnson's Great Society as part of the democratic socialist tradition and claimed the New Deal's legacy to "take up the unfinished business of the New Deal and carry it to completion."

While opponents of Sanders have used the democratic socialist label to accuse him of being too left-leaning for American politics, the theoretical and practical applications of it are based on the precept of shifting responsibility away from the national level to local decision-makers, a fundamental principle shared by the system of federalism in the United States. A democratic socialist perspective on government investment in infrastructure would support more projects with smaller-sized budgets on a local level instead of a few highly expensive ones. This view aligns with the Republican Party's fundamental identity, philosophy and agenda of local people exerting control over their own affairs.

In a 2018 poll conducted by Gallup, a majority of people under the age of 30 in the United States stated that they approve of socialism. 57% of Democratic-leaning voters viewed socialism positively and 47% saw capitalism positively while 71% of Republican-leaning voters who were polled saw capitalism under a positive light and 16% viewed socialism in a positive light. A 2019 YouGov poll found that 7 out of 10 millennials in the United States would vote for a socialist presidential candidate and 36% had a favorable view of communism. An earlier 2019 Harris Poll found that socialism is more popular with women than men, with 55% of women between the ages of 18 and 54 preferring to live in a socialist society while a majority of men surveyed in the poll chose capitalism over socialism.

Although there is no agreement on the meaning of socialism in those polls, there has been a steady increase of support for progressive reforms proposed by democratic socialist legislators such as the United States National Health Care Act to enact universal single-payer health care and the Green New Deal. In November 2018, Alexandria Ocasio-Cortez and Rashida Tlaib, who are members of the Democratic Socialists of America (DSA), the largest socialist organization in the United States, which pushes for policy reforms alongside non-governmental action, were elected to the House of Representatives while eleven DSA candidates were elected to state legislatures, a breakthrough in modern American politics. As of July 2023, there are now five DSA members and two non-DSA democratic socialists in the House of Representatives, one democratic socialist in the U.S. Senate, 51 DSA members in state legislatures, and 132 DSA members in local offices.

==== Latin America ====
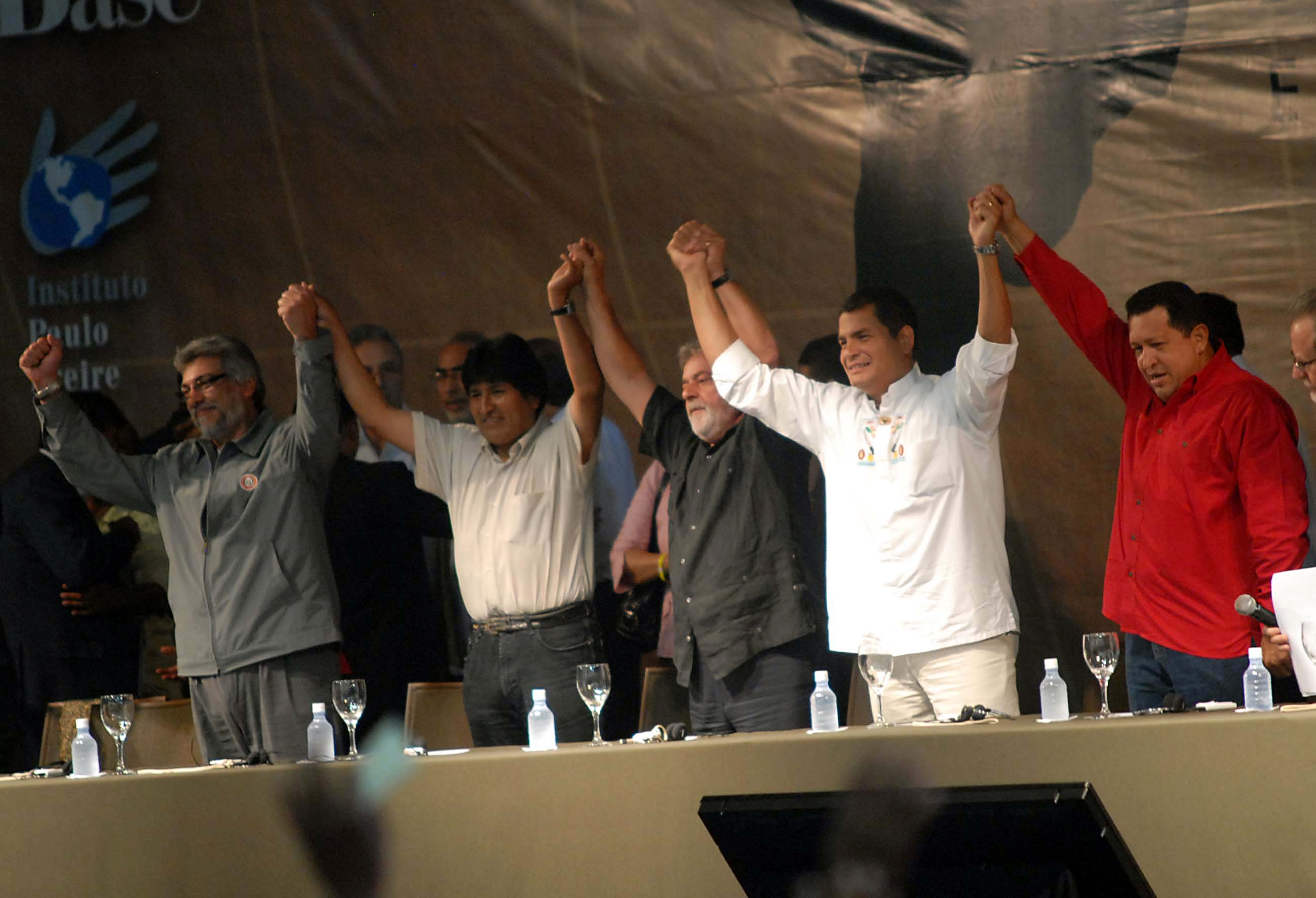
Presidents Fernando Lugo of Paraguay, Evo Morales of Bolivia, Luiz Inácio Lula da Silva of Brazil, Rafael Correa of Ecuador and Hugo Chávez of Venezuela attending the World Social Forum for Latin America

According to the Encyclopedia Britannica, "the attempt by Salvador Allende to unite Marxists and other reformers in a socialist reconstruction of Chile is most representative of the direction that Latin American socialists have taken since the late 20th century. ... Several socialist (or socialist-leaning) leaders have followed Allende's example in winning election to office in Latin American countries." Venezuelan President Hugo Chávez, Nicaraguan President Daniel Ortega, Bolivian President Evo Morales and Ecuadorian President Rafael Correa refer to their political programmes as socialist and Chávez adopted the term socialism of the 21st century. After winning re-election in December 2006, Chávez stated: "Now more than ever, I am obliged to move Venezuela's path towards socialism." The pink tide is a term used in the 2000s in political analysis in the media and elsewhere to describe the perception that left-wing politics were becoming increasingly influential in Latin America. To network this movement, the Foro de São Paulo is a conference of leftist political parties and other organisations from Latin America and the Caribbean. It launched in 1990 by the Brazilian Workers' Party in São Paulo, after the Workers' Party approached other parties and social movements of Latin America and the Caribbean with the objective of debating the new international scenario after the fall of the Berlin Wall and the consequences of the implementation of what were taken as neoliberal policies adopted at the time by contemporary right-leaning governments in the region, with the stated main objective of the conference being to argue for genuine alternatives to neoliberalism. Among its members, it includes democratic socialist and social democratic parties in the region such as Bolivia's Movement for Socialism, Brazil's Workers' Party, the Ecuadorian PAIS Alliance, the Venezuelan United Socialist Party of Venezuela, the Socialist Party of Chile, the Uruguayan Broad Front, the Nicaraguan Sandinista National Liberation Front and the Salvadoran Farabundo Martí National Liberation Front. Former members included the Brazilian Socialist Party and the Popular Socialist Party.

In Venezuela, Hugo Chávez was re-elected in October 2012 for his third six-year term as president, but he suddenly died in March 2013 from advanced cancer. After Chávez's death, Nicolás Maduro, the Vice President of the United Socialist Party of Venezuela (PSUV), assumed the powers and responsibilities of the president on 5 March 2013. A special presidential election was held the following which Maduro won by a tight margin as the PSUV's candidate. He was formally inaugurated on 19 April 2013. Most democratic socialist scholars and analysts have been sceptical of Chavismo and some of Latin America's other ruling parties as examples of democratic socialism. While citing their progressive role, they argue that the appropriate label for these governments is populism rather than socialism due to their authoritarian characteristics and occasional cults of personality. On socialist development in Venezuela, Chávez argued in 2012 that, with the second government plan (Plan de la Patria), "socialism has just begun to implant its internal dynamism among us" whilst acknowledging that "the socio-economic formation that still prevails in Venezuela is capitalist and rentier." This same thesis is defended by Maduro, who acknowledges that he has failed in the development of the productive forces while admitting that "the old model of corrupt and inefficient state capitalism" typical of traditional Venezuelan oil rentism has contradictorily combined with a statist model that "pretends to be a socialist."

There was a resurgence of the "pink tide" in the late 2010s. In Mexico, Andrés Manuel López Obrador of the National Regeneration Movement was elected in a landslide victory in the 2018 Mexican general election. Many of his policy proposals include traditionally labour based and social democratic reforms. This was followed by victory of the Movement for Socialism and its presidential candidate Luis Arce in Bolivia in the 2020 Bolivian general election, leftist Gabriel Boric's win in the 2021 Chilean general election, the 2022 Colombian presidential election won by leftist Gustavo Petro, making him the first left-wing president of Colombia in the country's 212-year history, and Lula's return to office in the 2022 Brazilian general election.

=== Asia ===
In Japan, the Japanese Communist Party (JPC) does not advocate for a violent revolution, instead proposing a parliamentary democratic revolution to achieve "democratic change in politics and the economy." There was a resurgent interest in the JPC among workers and the Japanese youth due to the 2008 financial crisis.

After the 2008 Malaysian general election, the Socialist Party of Malaysia got Michael Jeyakumar Devaraj as its first Member of Parliament.

In the Philippines, the main political party campaigning for democratic socialism is the Akbayan Citizens' Action Party which was founded by Joel Rocamora in January 1998 as a democratic socialist and progressive political party. The Akbayan Citizens' Action Party has consistently won seats in the House of Representatives, with Etta Rosales becoming its first representative. It won its first Senate seat in 2016, when its chairwoman, senator and Nobel Peace Prize nominee Risa Hontiveros was elected.

In 2010, there were 270 kibbutzim in Israel. Their factories and farms account for 9% of Israel's industrial output, worth US$8 billion and 40% of its agricultural output, worth over $1.7 billion. Some kibbutzim had also developed substantial high-tech and military industries. Also in 2010, Kibbutz Sasa, containing some 200 members, generated $850 million in annual revenue from its military-plastics industry.

Other democratic socialist parties in Asia include the National United Party of Afghanistan in Afghanistan, the April Fifth Action in Hong Kong, the All India Trinamool Congress, the Samajwadi Party, the Samta Party and the Sikkim Democratic Front in India, the Progressive Socialist Party in Lebanon, the Federal Socialist Forum and the Naya Shakti Party in Nepal, the Labor Party in South Korea and the Syrian Democratic People's Party and the Democratic Arab Socialist Union in Syria.

=== Europe ===
The objectives of the Party of European Socialists, the European Parliament's social democratic bloc, are now "to pursue international aims in respect of the principles on which the European Union is based, namely principles of freedom, equality, solidarity, democracy, respect of Human Rights and Fundamental Freedoms, and respect for the Rule of Law." As a result, today the rallying cry of the French Revolution—Liberté, égalité, fraternité—is promoted as essential socialist values. To the left of the European Socialists at the European level is the Party of the European Left, a political party at the European level and an association of democratic socialist and communist parties in the European Union and other European countries. It was formed for the purposes of running in the 2004 European Parliament election. The European Left was founded on 8–9 May 2004 in Rome.

Elected MEPs from member parties of the European Left sit in the European United Left–Nordic Green Left group in the European Parliament. The democratic socialist Left Party in Germany grew in popularity, as did popular dissatisfaction with the increasingly neoliberal policies of the Social Democratic Party of Germany after Gerhard Schröder's tenure as Chancellor, becoming the fourth biggest party in parliament in the general election on 27 September 2009. In 2008, the Progressive Party of Working People candidate Dimitris Christofias won a crucial presidential runoff in Cyprus, defeating his conservative rival with a majority of 53%. In 2007, the Danish Socialist People's Party more than doubled its parliamentary representation to 23 seats from 11, making it the fourth-largest party. In 2011, the Social Democrats, the Socialist People's Party and the Danish Social Liberal Party formed a government after a slight victory over the main rival political coalition. They were led by Helle Thorning-Schmidt and had the Red–Green Alliance as a supporting party. In Norway, the red–green alliance consists of the Labour Party, the Socialist Left Party and the Centre Party and governed the country as a majority government from 2005 to 2013. In the January 2015 legislative election, the Coalition of the Radical Left led by Alexis Tsipras and better known as Syriza won a legislative election for the first time while the Communist Party of Greece won 15 seats in parliament. Syriza has been characterised as an anti-establishment party, whose success sent "shock-waves across the EU."

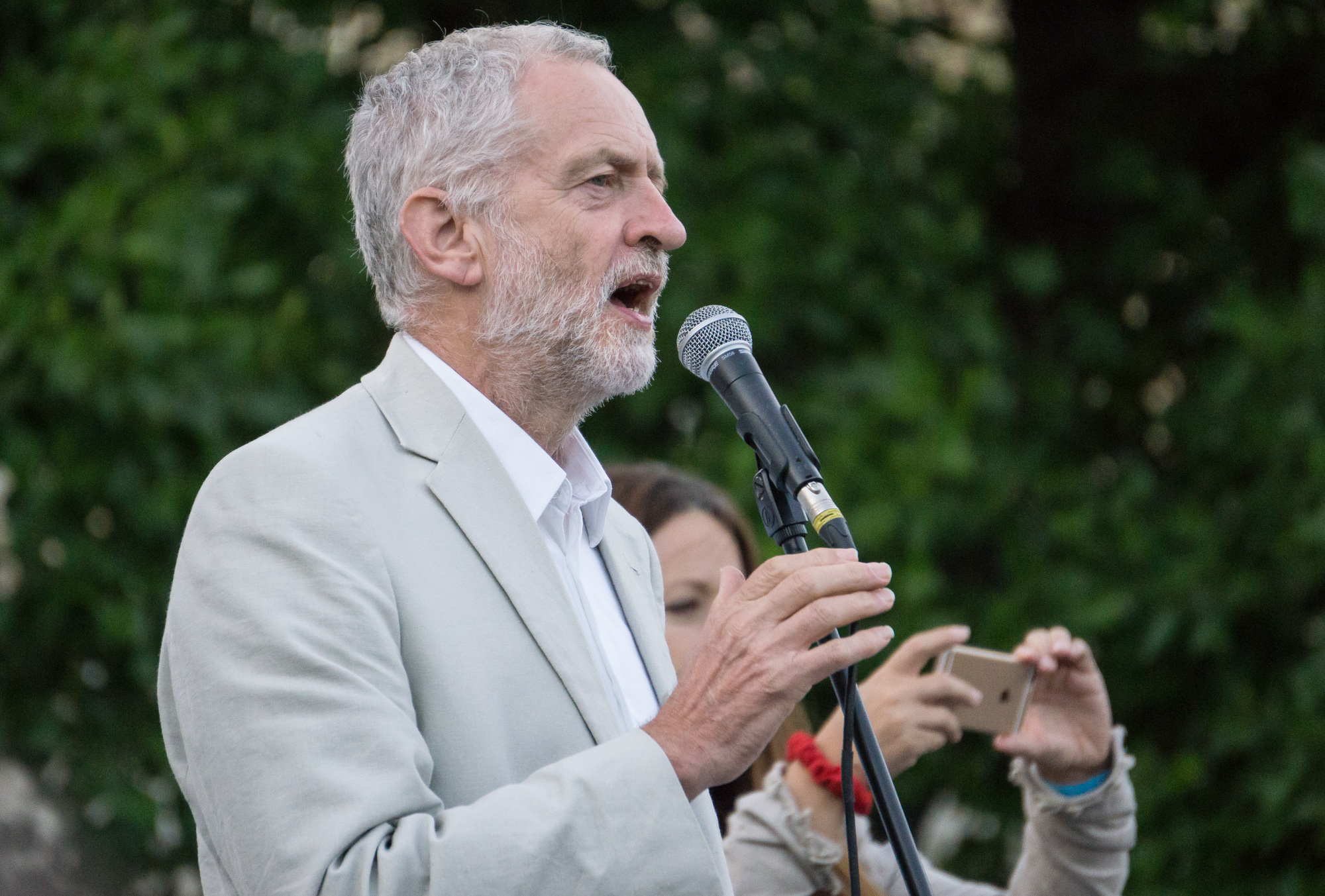
Jeremy Corbyn, who won the Labour Party leadership on a campaign of opposition to austerity and a rejection of Third Way Blairite politics within the Labour Party itself

In the United Kingdom, the National Union of Rail, Maritime and Transport Workers (RMT) put forward a slate of candidates in the 2009 European Parliament election under the banner of No to EU – Yes to Democracy, a broad left-wing Eurosceptic, alter-globalisation coalition involving socialist groups such as the Socialist Party, aiming to offer a leftist alternative among Eurosceptics to the anti-immigration and pro-business policies of the UK Independence Party. In the subsequent 2010 general election, the Trade Unionist and Socialist Coalition, launched in January 2010 and backed by Bob Crow, the leader of the RMT, along with other union leaders and the Socialist Party among other socialist groups, stood against the Labour Party in forty constituencies. The Trade Unionist and Socialist Coalition contested the 2011 local elections, having gained the endorsement of the RMT June 2010 conference, but it won no seats.

Left Unity was also founded in 2013 after the film director Ken Loach appealed for a new party of the left to replace the Labour Party which he claimed had failed to oppose austerity and had shifted towards neoliberalism. Following a second consecutive defeat in the 2015 general election, self-described democratic socialist Jeremy Corbyn succeeded Ed Miliband as the Leader of the Labour Party, leading some to comment that New Labour was "dead and buried." In the 2017 general election, Labour increased its share of the vote to 40% but in the 2019 general election, Labour's vote share fell again.

In France, Olivier Besancenot, the Revolutionary Communist League candidate in the 2007 presidential election, received 1,498,581 votes (4.08%), double that of the candidate from the French Communist Party candidate. The party abolished itself in 2009 to initiate a broad anti-capitalist movement within a new party called the New Anticapitalist Party, whose stated aim is to "build a new socialist, democratic perspective for the twenty-first century."

In Germany, The Left was founded in 2007 out of a merger of the Party of Democratic Socialism (PDS) and the Labour and Social Justice – The Electoral Alternative (WASG), a breakaway faction from the Social Democratic Party of Germany (SPD) which rejected then-SPD leader and German Chancellor Gerhard Schröder for his Third Way policies. According to Kate Hudon, these parties adopted policies to appeal to democratic socialists, greens, feminists and pacifists. Former SPD chairman Oskar Lafontaine has noted that the founding of The Left in Germany has resulted in emulation in other countries, with several Left parties being founded in Greece, Portugal, Netherlands and Syria. Lafontaine claims that a de facto British Left movement exists, identifying the Green Party of England and Wales as holding similar values. Nonetheless, a democratic socialist faction remains within the SPD. The SPD's Hamburg Programme (2007) describes democratic socialism as "an order of economy, state and society in which the civil, political, social and economic fundamental rights are guaranteed for all people, all people live a life without exploitation, oppression and violence, that is in social and human security" and as a "vision of a free, just and solidary society", the realisation of which is emphasised as a "permanent task." Social democracy serves as the "principle of action."

On 25 May 2014, the Spanish left-wing party Podemos entered candidates for the 2014 European parliamentary election, some of which were unemployed. In a surprise result, it won 7.98% of the vote and was awarded five seats out of 54 while the older United Left was the third largest overall force, obtaining 10.03% and five seats, four more than the previous elections. Although losing seats in both the April 2019 and November 2019 general elections, the result of the latter being a failure of negotiations with the Spanish Socialist Workers' Party (PSOE), Podemos reached an agreement with the PSOE for a full four-year coalition government, the first such government since the country's transition to democracy in 1976. While failing to get the necessary 176 out of 350 majority investiture vote on 5 January 2020, the PSOE–Unidas Podemos coalition government was able to get a simple majority (167–165) on 7 January 2020 and the new cabinet was sworn into office the following day.

The government of Portugal established on 26 November 2015 was a left-wing minority government led by Prime Minister António Costa Socialist Party, who succeeded in securing support for the government by the Left Bloc, the Portuguese Communist Party and the Ecologist Party "The Greens". This was largely confirmed in the 2019 legislative election, where the Socialist Party returned to first place, forming another left-wing minority government, this time led only by the Socialist Party. Nonetheless, Costa said he would look to continue the confidence-and-supply agreement with the Left Bloc and the Unitary Democratic Coalition.

=== Oceania ===
Since the end of Australia’s Whitlam government, the Australian Labour Party (ALP) has moved towards centrist policies and Third Way ideals which are supported by the ALP's Right Faction members while the supporters of democratic socialism and social democracy lie within the ALP's Left Faction. There has been an increase in interest for socialism in recent years, especially among young adults. Interest is strongest in Victoria, where the Victorian Socialists party was founded.

2017-23 Prime Minister Jacinda Ardern of the democratic socialist New Zealand Labour Party, who has called capitalism a "blatant failure" due to the extent of homelessness in New Zealand, has been described and identified herself as democratic socialist.

In Melanesia, Melanesian socialism was inspired by African socialism and developed in the 1980s. It aims to achieve full independence from Britain and France in Melanesian territories and creation of a Melanesian federal union. It is very popular with the New Caledonia independence movement.

== See also ==
- History of anarchism
- History of communism
- History of socialism

== Bibliography ==
- Barrow, Logie; Bullock, Ian (1996). Democratic Ideas and the British Labour Movement, 1880–1914. Cambridge University Press. ISBN 9780521560429.
- Benn, Tony (1980). Arguments for Socialism. Penguin. ISBN 9780140054897.
- Dorrien, Gary (2019). Social Democracy in the Making: The Political and Religious Roots of European Socialism. Yale University Press. ISBN 9780300236026.
- Draper, Hal (1966). "The Two Souls of Socialism". New Politics. 5 (1): 57–84.
- Harrington, Michael (1989). Socialism: Past and Future. Arcade Publishing. ISBN 9781559700009.
- Hatterlsey, Roy (1987). Choose Freedom: The Future of Democratic Socialism. Penguin. ISBN 0140104941.
- Doherty, James C.; Lamb, Peter (2006). Historical Dictionary of Socialism (2nd ed.). The Scarecrow Press. ISBN 9780810855601.
- Miliband, Ralph (1994). Socialism for a Sceptical Age. London, United Kingdom: Polity Press. ISBN 9780745614274.
- Reisman, Reidsman, ed. (1996). Democratic Socialism in Britain: Classic Texts in Economic and Political Thought, 1825–1952. Chatto and Pickering. ISBN 9781851962853.
- Thomas, Norman (1953). Democratic Socialism: A New Appraisal. League for Industrial Democracy. ASIN B0007ECO76.
- Tomlinson, Jim (1997). Democratic Socialism and Economic Policy: The Attlee Years, 1945–1951. Cambridge University Press. ISBN 0521550955.
