= Socialist Movement =

UK left-wing grouping following the 1984–1985 miners' strike

The Socialist Movement was a left-wing grouping in the United Kingdom which grew out of the Socialist Conferences held in Chesterfield, Sheffield and Manchester in the years following the defeat of the 1984–1985 miners' strike. Initiators included the Socialist Society, an organisation of left intellectuals including Raymond Williams, Richard Kuper, and Ralph Miliband, the Campaign Group, a left-wing group in the Labour Party, the Conference of Socialist Economists, and the network generated by the socialist feminist book Beyond the Fragments. The largest conferences were in 1987 and 1988.

The Socialist Movement was open to different left traditions, green as well as red, for exploratory, grassroots debate and research on socialist policy making.
