= Capital & Class =

Economics journal

- Discipline: Economics, Politics, History
- Language: English
- Edited by: Owen Worth

Publication details
- History: 1977–present
- Publisher: SAGE Publications
- Frequency: Quarterly
- Impact factor: 0.701 (2015)

Standard abbreviations
- ISO 4: Cap. Cl.

Indexing
- ISSN: 0309-8168
- LCCN: 83646930
- OCLC no.: 60621178

Links
- Journal homepage; Online access; Online archive

Capital & Class is a quarterly peer-reviewed academic journal covering political economy, sociology, and political science from a Marxist perspective. The journal's editorial board is elected by the members of the Conference of Socialist Economists at their annual meeting. The managing editor is Owen Worth (University of Limerick). It was established in 1977 and is currently published by SAGE Publications on behalf of the Conference of Socialist Economists.

== Abstracting and indexing ==
Capital and Class is abstracted and indexed in:

- Academic Search Complete
- Academic Search Premier
- ABI/INFORM
- EBSCO: EconLit
- International Bibliography of the Social Sciences
- Scopus
- SocINDEX
- Wilson OmniFile
