= Socialist Society =

- Formation: 1981
- Founder: Raymond Williams; Ralph Miliband
- Dissolved: 1993

The Socialist Society was founded in 1981 by a group of British socialists, including Raymond Williams and Ralph Miliband, who founded it as an organisation devoted to socialist education and research, linking the left of the British Labour Party with socialists outside it. The Society grew out of the New Left Review (NLR) and many of its active members were involved in the NLR: Robin Blackburn, Tariq Ali, Michèle Barrett, Michael Rustin and Hilary Wainwright. Other active and prominent members of the Society included Richard Kuper, John Palmer, John Williams and Barney Dickson. The Society published a magazine (Interlink, later relaunched under the name of Catalyst) and a series of pamphlets.

Many of its members were said to be active in the 1980s magazine Socialist Alternatives, edited for a period by Keir Starmer.

One of the Society's key goals was overcoming the division on the British Left between socialists inside and outside the Labour Party. To this end, the Society was jointly responsible, with the Conference of Socialist Economists, Tony Benn and the Campaign Group of Labour MPs, for the initiation of a series of conferences between 1987 and 1992 which were held in Chesterfield, Sheffield or Manchester and the subsequent founding of the Socialist Movement. The Society was opposed to Euroscepticism, committed to electoral reform and open to green ideas, all of which were fairly controversial on the left at the time. Several prominent figures involved in the society, including Miliband and Wainwright, were signatories to Charter88. Another organisational achievement of note was the founding of the Red-Green Network.

The Society's last AGM was in 1993.

== See also ==
- Socialist Register
- Soundings
