= Richard Kuper =

Activist and educator

- Born: Union of South Africa
- Occupations: Activist, publisher and educator
- Known for: Founder of Pluto Press

Richard Kuper is a South African-born activist and educator, who moved to England at the age of 20. He founded the London-based socialist publishing company Pluto Press in 1969, and has aso been a university lecturer.

In 2002, together with academic Irene Bruegel, Kuper was a founding member of the activist group Jews for Justice for Palestinians, which he chaired for many years.

== Biography ==
Richard Kuper was born in South Africa into "an atheist family that was part of a very Jewish community". He has said: "My upbringing in apartheid South Africa set me against injustice."

Moving to England at the age of 20, Kuper was a member of the International Socialists from 1964 to 1977, and in 1969 established the publishing house Pluto Press. There he was joined by Nina Kidron and Michael Kidron in 1972, with Pluto becoming "one of the most influential socialist publishing houses of that time".

In 2002, Kuper co-founded Jews for Justice for Palestinians together with academic Irene Bruegel (1945–2008), his partner for 36 years. Kuper also formerly chaired the organisation. He is a member of the executive committee of Jewish Voice for Liberation.

Kuper has also been a university lecturer, a trade union militant and a member of the Socialist Society, and an organic farmer.

He campaigns for Palestinian rights, for pluralism in the Jewish community, against antisemitism and in support of free speech on Israel, and among outlets for which he has written are Red Pepper, The Independent, Chartist, and openDemocracy.

== Publications ==
- The Meaning of Marxism: A Study Guide, Pluto Press/International Socialists, 1972
- Electing for Democracy: Proportional Representation and the Left, Socialist Society, 1990
- (With Patrick Herman, for the Confédération Paysanne) Food for Thought: Towards a Future For Farming, Pluto Press, 2003
- Editor, Capitalism and Theory: Selected Writings of Michael Kidron, Haymarket Books, 2018
