= Conference of Socialist Economists =

The Conference of Socialist Economists (CSE) describes itself as an international, democratic membership organisation committed to developing a materialist critique of capitalism, unconstrained by conventional academic divisions between subjects.

== History ==
CSE's origins lie in the general upsurge in socialist politics in the United Kingdom in the 1960s spurred by disillusion with the Labour government of Harold Wilson, and more specifically in a corresponding dissatisfaction with orthodox economic theory.

A first conference in January 1970 was attended by 75 people, mainly economists, who discussed papers on the capital controversy, the state of development economics, and the internationalisation of capital. A second conference in October of the same year attracted 125 participants (including 20 from abroad) and considered the economic role of the state in modern capitalism.

This event proved to be the founding conference, deciding to set up CSE as a permanent organisation, to organise a further conference on Britain and the EEC, and to investigate launching a journal. This further conference (December 1971) saw the launch of the Bulletin of the CSE, with the first issue containing four of the conference papers. The Bulletin was succeeded in 1977 by a refereed journal, Capital & Class, which continues to be published.

Notwithstanding its name and history, both CSE and Capital & Class live up to the declared aim of being unconstrained by conventional academic subject divisions. Probably only a minority of CSE members are professional economists, and the journal's contents range over the whole of the social and human sciences.

Common Sense was Journal of the Edinburgh Conference of Socialist Economists.

John Holloway was a member of the conference.

== See also ==
- Criticism of capitalism

== Bibliography ==
- Radice, Hugo. "A short history of the CSE" (PDF). Capital & Class. 10: 43–49.
- Piciotto, Sol (1986). "Ten years of Capital & Class". Capital & Class. 30 (3): 7–15. doi:10.1177/030981688603000101. S2CID 143954136.
- Barratt Brown, Michael. "In honour of the 50th issue of Capital & Class and the approaching 25th anniversary of the CSE". Capital & Class. 50: 7–9.
- Lee, Frederic S. (2001). "Conference of Socialist Economists and the emergence of heterodox economics in post-war Britain". Capital & Class. 75 (3): 15–39. doi:10.1177/030981680107500102. S2CID 155036484.
