= List of Radical Thinkers releases =

Radical Thinkers is a series of books released through Verso Books, publishing prominent radical literature.

== First 8 sets ==
Each of the fist eight sets was released annually and contained 11-12 books, without a central theme between them.

Radical Thinkers Set	Title	Author	Translator(s)	Original Publication Date	Pages	ISBN (Print)
Set 1 (January 2006)	Minima Moralia: Reflections on a Damaged Life	Theodor Adorno	E. F. N. Jephcott	1951	256	978-1844670512
Set 1 (January 2006)	For Marx	Louis Althusser	Ben Brewster	1969	259	978-1844670529
Set 1 (January 2006)	The System of Objects	Jean Baudrillard	James Benedict	1968	224	978-1844670536
Set 1 (January 2006)	Liberalism and Democracy	Norberto Bobbio	Martin Ryle and Kate Soper	1985	94	978-1844670628
Set 1 (January 2006)	The Politics of Friendship	Jacques Derrida	George Collins	1994	312	978-1844670543
Set 1 (January 2006)	The Function of Criticism	Terry Eagleton	N/A	1984	136	978-1844670550
Set 1 (January 2006)	Signs Taken for Wonders: Essays in the Sociology of Literary Forms	Franco Moretti	Susan Fischer, David Forgacs, and Davis Miller	1983	273	978-1844670567
Set 1 (January 2006)	The Return of the Political	Chantal Mouffe	N/A	1993	240	978-1844670574
Set 1 (January 2006)	Sexuality in the Field of Vision	Jacqueline Rose	N/A	1986	270	978-1844670581
Set 1 (January 2006)	The Information Bomb	Paul Virilio	Chris Turner	2000	146	978-1844670598
Set 1 (January 2006)	Culture and Materialism	Raymond Williams	N/A	1980	288	978-1844670604
Set 1 (January 2006)	The Metastases of Enjoyment: Six Essays on Women and Causality	Slavoj Žižek	N/A	1994	228	978-1844670611
Set 2 (January 2007)	Infancy and History: On the Destruction of Experience	Giorgio Agamben	Liz Heron	1978	176	978-1844675715
Set 2 (January 2007)	Politics and History: Montesquieu, Rousseau, Marx	Louis Althusser	Ben Brewster	1972	192	978-1844675722
Set 2 (January 2007)	Fragments	Jean Baudrillard	Emily Agar	1997	148	978-1844675739
Set 2 (January 2007)	Logics of Disintegration	Peter Dews	N/A	1987	331	978-1844675746
Set 2 (January 2007)	Late Marxism: Adorno, or, The Persistence of the Dialectic	Fredric Jameson	N/A	1990	270	978-1844675753
Set 2 (January 2007)	Emancipation(s)	Ernesto Laclau	N/A	1996	124	978-1844675760
Set 2 (January 2007)	Political Descartes: Reason, Ideology and the Bourgeois Project	Antonio Negri	Matteo Mandarini and Alberto Toscano	2007	344	978-1844675821
Set 2 (January 2007)	On the Shores of Politics	Jacques Rancière	Liz Heron	1998	107	978-1844675777
Set 2 (January 2007)	Strategy of Deception	Paul Virilio	N/A	1999	82	978-1844675784
Set 2 (January 2007)	Politics of Modernism: Against the New Conformists	Raymond Williams	N/A	1989	220	978-1844675807
Set 2 (January 2007)	The Indivisible Remainder	Slavoj Žižek	N/A	1996	254	978-1844675814
Set 3 (January 2008)	In Theory: Nations, Classes, Literatures	Aijaz Ahmad	N/A	1992	358	978-1844672134
Set 3 (January 2008)	The Perfect Crime	Jean Baudrillard	Chris Turner	1995	156	978-1859840443
Set 3 (January 2008)	A Realist Theory of Science	Roy Bhaskar	N/A	1975	262	978-1844672042
Set 3 (January 2008)	A Study on Authority	Herbert Marcuse	Joris De Bres	2008	112	978-1844672097
Set 3 (January 2008)	Spinoza and Politics	Etienne Balibar and Warren Montag	Peter Snowdon	1985	160	978-1844672059
Set 3 (January 2008)	The Emergence of Social Space: Rimbaud and the Paris Commune	Kristin Ross	N/A	1989	190	978-1844672066
Set 3 (January 2008)	Between Existentialism and Marxism	Jean-Paul Sartre	John Matthews	1960	302	978-1844672073
Set 3 (January 2008)	Ghostly Demarcations: A Symposium on Jacques Derrida's Specters of Marx	Michael Sprinker (editor)	N/A	1999	278	978-1844672110
Set 3 (January 2008)	What Does the Ruling Class Do When It Rules?	Göran Therborn	N/A	1978	290	978-1844672103
Set 3 (January 2008)	Open Sky	Paul Virilio	Julie Rose	1995	162	978-1844672080
Set 3 (January 2008)	For They Know Not What They Do	Slavoj Žižek	N/A	1991	288	978-1844672127
Set 4 (June 2009)	In Search of Wagner	Theodor Adorno	Rodney Livingstone	1952	148	978-1844673445
Set 4 (June 2009)	The Transparency of Evil: Essays on Extreme Phenomena	Jean Baudrillard	James Benedict	1990	208	978-1844673452
Set 4 (June 2009)	War and Cinema: The Logistics of Perception	Paul Virilio	Patrick Camiller	1991	160	978-1844673469
Set 4 (June 2009)	Reading Capital	Louis Althusser and Étienne Balibar	Ben Brewster	1965	384	978-1844673476
Set 4 (June 2009)	The Origin of German Tragic Drama	Walter Benjamin	John Osborne	1928	256	978-1844673483
Set 4 (June 2009)	The Cultural Turn: Selected Writings on the Postmodern, 1983–1998	Fredric Jameson	N/A	1998	224	978-1844673490
Set 4 (June 2009)	Walter Benjamin, Or, Towards a Revolutionary Criticism	Terry Eagleton	N/A	1981	208	978-1844673506
Set 4 (June 2009)	Ethics-Politics-Subjectivity: Derrida, Levinas and Contemporary French Thought	Simon Critchley	N/A	1999	314	978-1844673513
Set 4 (June 2009)	Lenin: A Study on the Unity of His Thought	György Lukács	Nicholas Jacobs	1924	102	978-1844673520
Set 4 (June 2009)	Panegyric	Guy Debord	James Brook and John McHale	1989	192	978-1844673537
Set 4 (June 2009)	Hegel Contra Sociology	Gillian Rose	N/A	1981	290	978-1844673544
Set 4 (June 2009)	The Democratic Paradox	Chantal Mouffe	N/A	2000	156	978-1844673551
Set 5 (January 2011)	Machiavelli and Us	Louis Althusser and François Matheron	Gregory Elliott	1999	160	978-1844676750
Set 5 (January 2011)	Race, Nation, Class: Ambiguous Identities	Étienne Balibar and Immanuel Wallerstein	N/A	1991	310	978-1844676712
Set 5 (January 2011)	Passwords	Jean Baudrillard	Chris Turner	2000	110	978-1844676767
Set 5 (January 2011)	The Panopticon Writings	Jeremy Bentham	N/A	1791	168	978-1844676668
Set 5 (January 2011)	Comments on the Society of the Spectacle	Guy Debord	Malcolm Imrie	1988	104	978-1844676729
Set 5 (January 2011)	Design and Crime (And Other Diatribes)	Hal Foster	N/A	2002	192	978-1844676705
Set 5 (January 2011)	Critique of Economic Reason	André Gorz	N/A	1989	262	978-1844676675
Set 5 (January 2011)	Brecht and Method	Fredric Jameson	N/A	1998	240	978-1844676774
Set 5 (January 2011)	The Politics of Time: Modernity and Avant-Garde	Peter Osborne	N/A	1995	288	978-1844676736
Set 5 (January 2011)	Postmodern Geographies: The Reassertion of Space in Critical Social Theory	Edward W. Soja	N/A	1989	228	978-1844676699
Set 5 (January 2011)	Freudian Slip: Psychoanalysis and Textual Criticism	Sebastiano Timpanaro	N/A	1976	236	978-1844676743
Set 5 (January 2011)	Contingency, Hegemony, Universality: Contemporary Dialogues on the Left	Slavoj Žižek, Ernesto Laclau, and Judith Butler	N/A	2000	330	978-1844676682
Set 6 (February 2012)	Quasi Una Fantasia: Essays on Modern Music	Theodor Adorno	Rodney Livingstone	1982	336	978-1844677924
Set 6 (February 2012)	Philosophy and the Spontaneous Philosophy of the Scientists	Louis Althusser	Gregory Elliot	1974	314	978-1844677894
Set 6 (February 2012)	Anti-Systemic Movements	Giovanni Arrighi, Terence K. Hopkins, and Immanuel Wallerstein	N/A	1989	123	978-1844677863
Set 6 (February 2012)	Metapolitics	Alain Badiou	Jason Barker	1998	204	978-1844677818
Set 6 (February 2012)	Politics and the Other Scene	Étienne Balibar	Daniel Hahn	2002	192	978-1844677856
Set 6 (February 2012)	Impossible Exchange	Jean Baudrillard	Chris Turner	1999	208	978-1844677917
Set 6 (February 2012)	The Mental and the Material	Maurice Godelier	Martin Thom	1984	272	978-1789600407
Set 6 (February 2012)	Immanuel Kant	Lucien Goldmann	Robert Black	1945	240	978-1844677825
Set 6 (February 2012)	Politics and Ideology in Marxist Theory: Capitalism, Fascism, Populism	Ernesto Laclau	N/A	1979	208	978-1844677887
Set 6 (February 2012)	Introduction to Modernity	Henri Lefebvre	John Moore	1995	416	978-1844677832
Set 6 (February 2012)	War Diaries: Notebooks from a Phoney War 1939-40	Jean-Paul Sartre	Quintin Hoare	1983	358	978-1844677849
Set 6 (February 2012)	Ethics of the Real: Kant and Lacan	Alenka Zupančič	N/A	2000	288	978-1844677870
Set 7 (January 2013)	Ethics: An Essay on the Understanding of Evil	Alain Badiou	Peter Hallward	1994	224	978-1781680186
Set 7 (January 2013)	The Spirit of Terrorism	Jean Baudrillard	Chris Turner	2001	96	978-1781680209
Set 7 (January 2013)	Infinitely Demanding: Ethics of Commitment, Politics of Resistance	Simon Critchley	N/A	2007	176	978-1781680179
Set 7 (January 2013)	The Fiery Brook: Selected Writings	Ludwig Feuerbach	Zawar Hanfi		320	978-1781680216
Set 7 (January 2013)	Rationality and Irrationality in Economics	Maurice Godelier	Brian Pearce	1972	368	978-1781680254
Set 7 (January 2013)	Capitalism, Socialism, Ecology	André Gorz	Chris Turner	1991	160	978-1781680261
Set 7 (January 2013)	Critique of Instrumental Reason	Max Horkheimer	Matthew J. O'Connell	1967	176	978-1781680230
Set 7 (January 2013)	A Singular Modernity: Essay on the Ontology of the Present	Fredric Jameson	N/A	2002	250	978-1781680223
Set 7 (January 2013)	Marxism and Philosophy	Karl Korsch	Fred Halliday	1923	176	978-1781680278
Set 7 (January 2013)	Sex-pol: Essays, 1929–1934	Wilhelm Reich	Anna Bostock		416	978-1781680247
Set 7 (January 2013)	Freudianism: A Marxist Critique	Valentin Voloshinov	I. R. Titunik	1927	176	978-1781680285
Set 7 (January 2013)	Welcome to the Desert of the Real	Slavoj Žižek	N/A	2001	160	978-1781680193
Set 8 (January 2014)	The Spectre Of Hegel: Early Writings	Louis Althusser	G. M. Goshgarian	1997	352	978-1781681510
Set 8 (January 2014)	The Philosophy Of Marx	Étienne Balibar	Chris Turner	1993	139	978-1781681534
Set 8 (January 2014)	Screened Out	Jean Baudrillard	Chris Turner	1997	240	978-1781681558
Set 8 (January 2014)	Hegemony and Socialist Strategy: Towards a Radical Democratic Politics	Ernesto Laclau and Chantal Mouffe	N/A	1985	224	978-1781681541
Set 8 (January 2014)	Tactics and Ethics, 1919–1929:The Questions of Parliamentarianism and Other Essays	György Lukács	Michael McColgan	1972	288	978-1781681497
Set 8 (January 2014)	State, Power, Socialism	Nicos Poulantzas	Patrick Camiller	1978	284	978-1781681480
Set 8 (January 2014)	Hatred of Democracy	Jacques Rancière	Steve Corcoran	2005	106	978-1781681503
Set 8 (January 2014)	The Melancholy Science: An Introduction to the Thought of Theodor W. Adorno	Gillian Rose	N/A	1978	212	978-1781681527
Set 8 (January 2014)	Women, Resistance and Revolution: A History Of Women And Revolution In The Modern World	Sheila Rowbotham	N/A	1972	288	978-1781681466
Set 8 (January 2014)	Freud And the Non-European	Edward Said	N/A	2002	96	978-1781681459
Set 8 (January 2014)	The Concept of Nature in Marx	Alfred Schmidt	N/A	1973	252	978-1781681473
Set 8 (January 2014)	The Ego and His Own: The Case of the Individual Against Authority	Max Stirner	Steven T. Byington	1844	368	978-1781681565

== Later sets ==
With set 9 the series shifted towards themes and began to release more frequently with fewer titles in each set.

Radical Thinkers Set	Title	Author	Translator(s)	Original Publication Date	Pages	ISBN (Print)
Set 9 (January 2015)	The Anti-Social Family	Michèle Barrett and Mary McIntosh	N/A	1982	176	978-1781687598
Set 9 (January 2015)	Woman's Estate	Juliet Mitchell	N/A	1971	184	978-1781687628
Set 9 (January 2015)	Woman's Consciousness, Man's World	Sheila Rowbotham	N/A	1974	144	978-1781687536
Set 9 (January 2015)	Straight Sex: Rethinking the Politics of Pleasure	Lynne Segal	N/A	1994	392	978-1781687567
Set 10 (June 2015)	The Dialectics of Liberation	David Cooper, Stokely Carmichael, R.D. Laing, Herbert Marcuse and Paul Goodman	N/A	1968	208	978-1781688915
Set 10 (June 2015)	Freud: The Theory of the Unconscious	Octave Mannoni	N/A	1968	224	978-1781688946
Set 10 (June 2015)	Read My Desire: Lacan Against the Historicists	Joan Copjec	N/A	1994	288	978-1781688885
Set 10 (June 2015)	The Weary Sons of Freud	Catherine Clément	Nicole Ball	1978	128	978-1781688854
Set 11 (September 2015)	Marx on Money	Suzanne de Brunhoff	N/A	1973	144	978-1784782269
Set 11 (September 2015)	Value: The Representation of Labour in Capitalism	Diane Elson	N/A	1980	192	978-1784782290
Set 11 (September 2015)	The Formation of the Economic Thought of Karl Marx: 1843 to Capital	Ernest Mandel		1967	224	978-1784782320
Set 11 (September 2015)	A Theory of Capitalist Regulation: The US Experience	Michel Aglietta	N/A	1979	448	978-1784782382
Set 12 (February 2016)	Frames of War: When is Life Grievable?	Judith Butler	N/A	2009	193	978-1784782474
Set 12 (February 2016)	Public Sphere and Experience: Analysis of the Bourgeois and Proletarian Public Sphere	Oskar Negt and Alexander Kluge		1972	352	978-1784782412
Set 12 (February 2016)	Marx and Human Nature: Refutation of a Legend	Norman Geras		1983	128	978-1784782351
Set 12 (February 2016)	Democracy Against Capitalism: Renewing Historical Materialism	Ellen Meiksins Wood	N/A	1995	320	978-1784782443
Set 13 (November 2016)	If They Come in the Morning: Voices of Resistance	Angela Davis (ed.), George Jackson, Bettina Aptheker, Bobby Seale, James Baldwin, Ruchell Magee, Julian Bond, Huey P. Newton, Erika Huggins, Fleeta Drumgo and John Clutchette	N/A	1971	288	978-1784787691
Set 13 (November 2016)	American Civilization	C. L. R. James	N/A	1993	320	978-1784787721
Set 13 (November 2016)	Darkwater: Voices from Within the Veil	W. E. B. Du Bois	N/A	1920	176	978-1784787752
Set 13 (November 2016)	Beyond Black and White: From Civil Rights to Barack Obama	Manning Marable	N/A	1995	352	978-1784787660
Set 13 (November 2016)	Invisibility Blues: From Pop to Theory	Michele Wallace	N/A	1990	288	978-1786631954

== Radical Thinkers Classics ==
In 2010, Verso Books reprinted 4 books in hardback under the Radical Thinkers Classics designation as part of Verso's 40th anniversary celebration.

Title	Author	Translator(s)	Original Publication Date	Pages	ISBN (Print)
Minima Moralia: Reflections on a Damaged Life	Theodor Adorno	E. F. N. Jephcott	1951	272	978-1844676613
For Marx	Louis Althusser	Ben Brewster	1969	272	978-1844676620
Aesthetics and Politics	Theodor W. Adorno, Walter Benjamin, Bertolt Brecht and György Lukács		1977	220	978-1844676644
Culture and Materialism	Raymond Williams	N/A	1980	320	978-1844676637
