= Women's Oppression Today =

Women's Oppression Today: Problems in Marxist Feminist Analysis is a non-fiction book by Michèle Barrett (New Left Books, 1980).

== Author ==
A socialist feminist, Barrett is best known for her books The Anti-Social Family (1982), which was written with Mary McIntosh; and Women's Oppression Today (1980), which attempted to reconcile feminist and Marxist analyses.

== Reviews ==
Reviewing the book shortly after publication, Miriam M. Johnson described how Barrett could not totally combine Marxism and feminism, and reached "a more sociological perspective, in which both economic and ideological factors are given independent weight".

Barrett also questioned the close link between feminism and literary criticism, saying "I can find no sustained argument as to why feminists should be so interested in literature or what theoretical or political ends such a study should serve". Barrett argued that the invention of the housewife and the male breadwinner suited the bourgeoisie and capitalist production, but also relied on the pre-existing gender ideology of male supremacy. Her focus on ideology to explain modern family structure was critiqued, including by Colin Creighton as "imprecise and undeveloped".

Laura Rice-Sayre, praising the work as "thorough and perceptive", commented on Barrett's point that Marxist analysis is "sex blind" and that women's oppression under capitalism rests on divisions that pre-date capitalism.

Johanna Brenner and Maria Ramas' 1984 piece, "Rethinking Women's Oppression", critiqued the book for not focussing sufficiently on material conditions rather than ideology.

Joan Landes said the book was "a useful introduction to the British feminist left", and commented on a lack of questioning of Marxist theory and an incorrect focus on "right thinking" instead of power structures: "She never entertains the possibility that a feminist approach to reproduction, ideology, or gender, for example, may require a reinterpretation of Marx's account ... She disregards the observation that women are advantaged or disadvantaged by forms of organizational structure, that socialism is not just a set of principles to be implemented in the future, but the living practices of an historical movement."

June Howard focussed on Barrett's place among Marxist theory: "I would characterize the tendency within Marxist thought which informs Barrett's work as an anti-economistic Marxism which has been strongly influenced by Althusser, Gramsci and the consequences other theorists have derived from their works, although Barrett strongly asserts her differences with the extreme positions in this 'post-Althusserian' dialogue". Her use of Louis Althusser's theories helped popularise his work.

Charlene Gannage said that "Barrett makes a strong argument for stressing the inter-relationship of theory and history" but that she fails "to pose a theoretical framework for understanding women’s collective resistance to their oppression".

Stevi Jackson and Sue Scott said the book was influential in turning feminists away from interactionism as an explanation for sexuality, which they regretted three decades later.

== Editions ==
The 1988 edition had a new subtitle, "The Marxist/Feminist Encounter", Barrett by then being uncomfortable with the idea of Marxist feminism. In it, Barrett coined the term "New Australian Feminism" for the work of Moira Gatens and Elizabeth Grosz, which had a mixed reception in the country. Influenced by African-American writers, the second edition also revised the focus on family as the cause of women's oppression to include the role of the state.

Reviewing the 2014 Verso Books edition, Rita Mookerjee discussed how the book is "of its time" in the way it focuses on "Anglo-Western women" and how it "places an emphasis on biological determinants that, in the following decade, are proven by Judith Butler to be flimsy", and yet "aptly historicizes economics and feminism in a way that allows readers to locate ideological shifts and trends". Judith Stacey recounted how Barrett's shift to post-structuralism in the 1990s made her quip that the only word in the book's title she was still comfortable with was "today".
