= Men of Letters =

Book by Duncan Barrett

Men of Letters: The Post Office Heroes Who Fought The Great War
- Author: Duncan Barrett
- Language: English
- Subject: First World War, Post Office Rifles
- Publisher: AA Publishing
- Publication date: 1 August 2014
- Publication place: United Kingdom
- Pages: 336 (paperback)
- ISBN: 978-0749575205
- Preceded by: GI Brides

Men of Letters: The Post Office Heroes who Fought the Great War is a book by Duncan Barrett, co-author of The Sugar Girls and GI Brides and editor of The Reluctant Tommy. It was published by AA Publishing on 1 August 2014 and officially launched on 4 August to marked the hundredth anniversary of Britain's declaration of war.

== Content ==
The book tells the story of the Post Office Rifles during the First World War. 12,000 men served with the unit during the course of the war, across three battalions, and around 1,500 of them were killed. The book describes in detail the horror and suffering of the war and Barrett writes about a man who was shot in the head by a former Post Office colleague before being suffocated by mud near Passchendaele. He also describes the humour of life in the trenches, including an incident in which some former postmen delivered mail to the Germans on the other side of no man's land by wedging them into carrots and throwing them across.

Barrett's research for the book involved reading memoirs written by men who served with the Post Office Rifles, as well as their letters and diary entries from the time, held at the Imperial War Museum and the British Postal Museum & Archive. He was in part inspired to write it after learning that his own great-great-uncle had fought alongside the Post Office Rifles at High Wood, although in a different London regiment.

== Reception ==
The book was positively reviewed by Christopher Hirst in the i, Paul Pettengale in History of War magazine and a reviewer in Britain at War magazine, and received radio coverage on BBC Radio London, BBC Radio Bristol and BBC Radio Derby.
