= Seal Líneas Aéreas =

Regional Argentine airline

Seal Líneas Aéreas SA de CV was a regional Argentine airline based in Salta that formed part of Grupo Atahualpa.

The airline operated with a plane CASA C-212 with capacity for 18 passengers for flights to San Ramón de la Nueva Orán. In the late 1980s tried an "ambitious" expansion and inaugurated a service to Asunción. Defunct in the early 1990s due to economic difficulties. The aircraft was sold to Lineas Aéreas Santafesinas

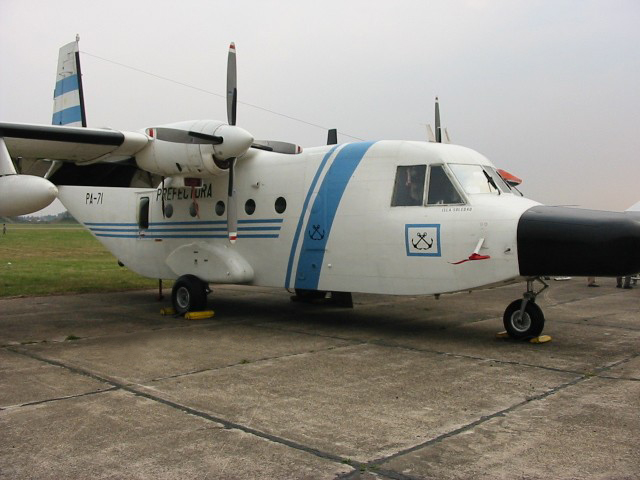
A CASA C-212-200. A plane like this was operated by Seal Líneas Aéreas.
