= Raymond Nonnatus =

Medieval saint from Catalonia in Spain

Saint Raymond Nonnatus O. de M.
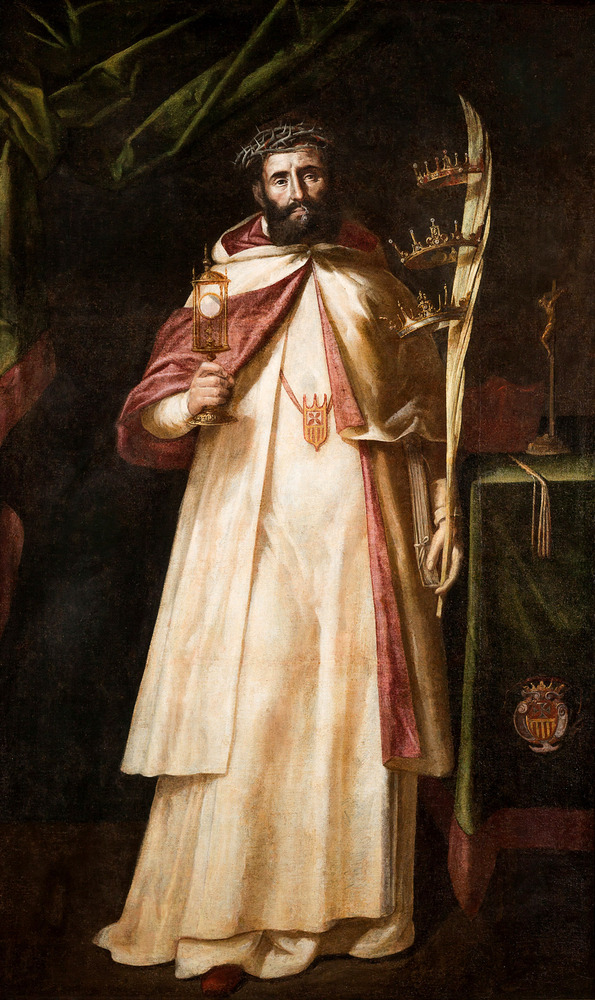
- Saint Raymond Nonnatus by Antonio del Castillo y Saavedra, 1640

Religious, priest and confessor
- Born: 1204; Portell, Catalonia
- Died: 31 August 1240 (aged 35–36); Castle of Cardona, Catalonia
- Venerated in: Roman Catholic Church
- Beatified: 9 May 1626, Rome, Papal States by Pope Urban VIII
- Canonized: 13 August 1669, Rome by Pope Clement IX
- Feast: 31 August
- Attributes: A Mercedarian friar wearing a cardinal's red mozzetta, holding a monstrance and a martyr's palm branch
- Patronage: Baitoa, Dominican Republic; Moncada, Tarlac; childbirth; expectant mothers; pregnant women; newborn babies; infants; children; obstetricians; midwives; fever; the falsely accused; confidentiality of confession

Raymond Nonnatus (Note: Catalan: Sant Ramon Nonat; Spanish: San Ramón Nonato; French: Saint Raymond Nonnat; Maltese: San Rajmondo Nonnato) (1204 – 31 August 1240) was a Mercedarian friar and missionary from Catalonia in Spain. His byname, meaning "not born" in Latin, refers to his birth by Caesarean section, his mother having died in labour.

Raymond is the patron saint of childbirth, midwives, children, pregnant women, and priests defending the confidentiality of confession.

== Life ==
According to the traditions of the Mercedarian Order, he was born in the village of Portell (today part of Sant Ramon), in the Diocese of Urgell. He was taken from the womb of his mother after her death, hence his name. Some traditions describe him as the son of the local count, who is traditionally credited as the one to have performed the surgery which saved his life, others that he was born in a family of shepherds. His well-educated father planned a career for his son at the royal court of the Kingdom of Aragon. When the boy felt drawn to religious life, his father ordered him to manage one of the family farms. What is known is that Raymond spent his childhood tending sheep and would often pray at an ancient country chapel nearby dedicated to Saint Nicholas. If he was of aristocratic descent, clearly his father eventually abandoned hopes for his son's social advancement.

His father later gave him permission to take the habit with the Mercedarians at Barcelona. The order was founded to ransom Christian captives from the Moors of North Africa. Raymond was trained by the founder of that order himself, St. Peter Nolasco. He was ordained a priest in 1222 and later became Master General of the Order.

Raymond then set out to fulfill the goals of the Order. He went to Valencia, where he ransomed 140 Christians from slavery. He then traveled to North Africa, where he was able to ransom another 250 captives in Algiers, and then went to Tunis, where he is said to have surrendered himself as a hostage for 28 captive Christians when his money ran out, in keeping with a special fourth vow taken by the members of the order. He suffered in captivity as a legend states that the Moors bored a hole through his lips with a hot iron, and padlocked his mouth to prevent him from preaching. He was ransomed by his order and returned to Spain in 1239.

Raymond died at the Castle of Cardona, sixty miles from Barcelona, either on 26 August or on 31 August 1240. According to tradition, the local count, the friars and the town all claimed his body. To resolve this dispute, the body was placed on a blind mule, which was let loose. Unguided, it went to the nearby country chapel where he had prayed in his youth. It was there that he was buried. Many miracles were attributed to him before and after his death.

In the historiography and hagiography from the 16th century, it is repeatedly claimed that upon his return to Spain in 1239, Pope Gregory IX nominated him Cardinal Deacon of Sant'Eustachio, and that he died en route to Rome. Consequently, he is traditionally depicted as wearing the scarlet red mozzetta of a cardinal. However, Italian historian Agostino Paravicini Bagliani has established that this account resulted from a confusion of Raymond Nonnatus with Englishman Robert Somercote, the Cardinal Deacon of S. Eustachio 1238–1241, and has concluded that Raymond was never a cardinal.

Raymond was canonized by Pope Alexander VII in 1657. His feast day is celebrated on 31 August.

== Veneration ==
The towns of Saint-Raymond, Quebec, Canada; San Ramón de la Nueva Orán, Argentina; São Raimundo Nonato, Brazil; San Ramón in Costa Rica are named for him. A shrine in Buenos Aires and the Roman Catholic Diocese of São Raimundo Nonato (Raymundianus) in Brazil are dedicated to him.

In the United States, the Parish of St. Raymond, in the New York City Borough of the Bronx; the Cathedral of St. Raymond Nonnatus in Joliet, Illinois;, St. Raymond Parish in Raymond, Illinois and St. Raymond Catholic Community in Downey, California; are under his patronage. There is also a parish dedicated to him in Juana Díaz, Puerto Rico.

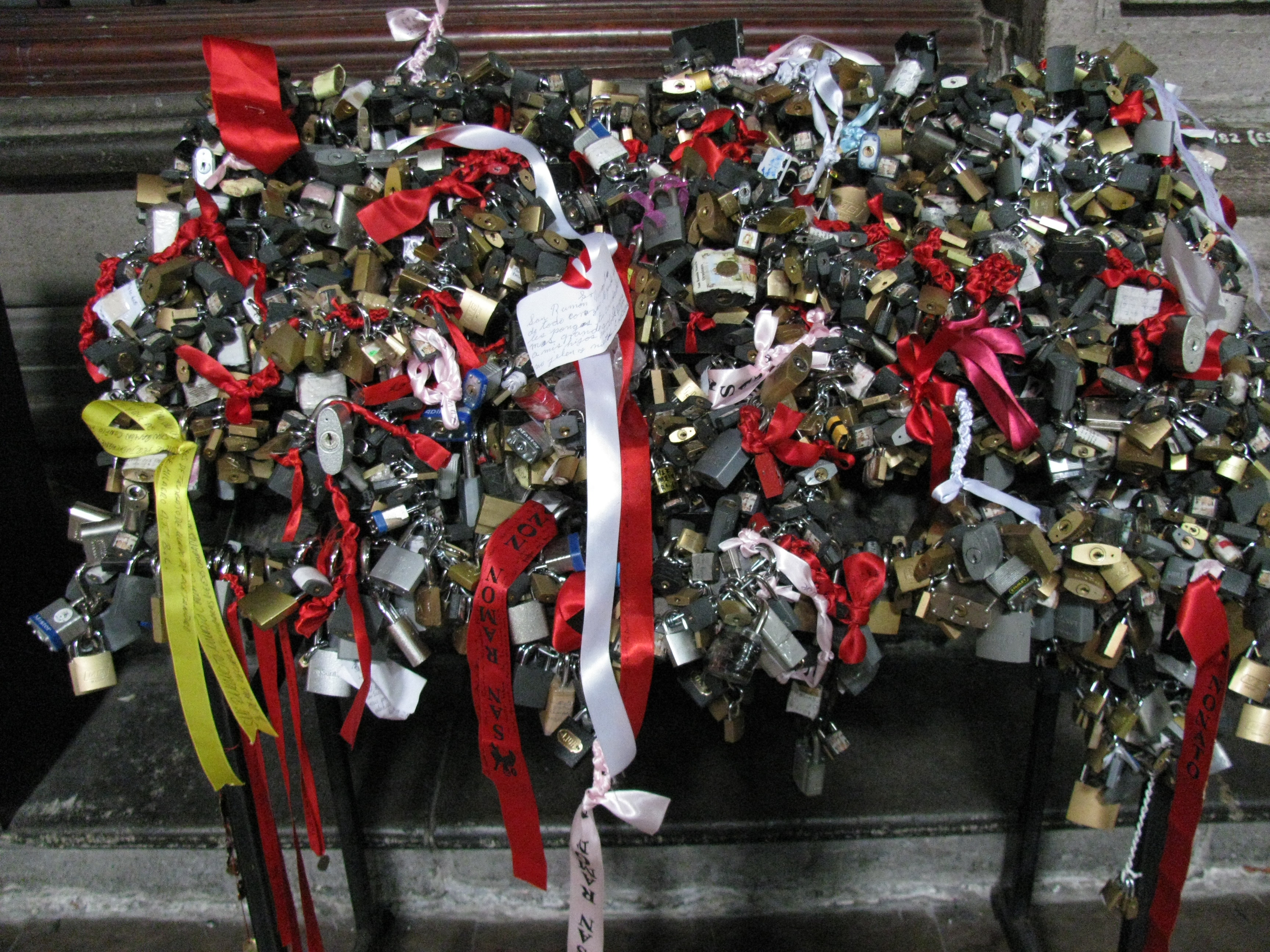
Altar of Saint Raymond Nonnatus, Metropolitan Cathedral, Mexico City

Due to the story of his own birth, Raymond quickly became widely invoked by women facing childbirth.

In Brazil, the village of São Raimundo, São Bernardo, was named in his homage, due the homonimous chapel built by Antônio Pires Ferreira for his slaves.

Due to his limited historical importance, however, since the reforms of the Church calendar in 1969, the liturgical commemoration of Raymond's feast day is no longer included among those to be necessarily observed wherever the Roman Rite is celebrated, but, since he is included in the Roman Martyrology for 31 August, Mass and the Liturgy of the Hours may be recited in his honor on that day as in the pre-1970 General Roman Calendar, which is observed by some traditionalist Catholics.

One particular devotion is centered around the padlock that is part of his martyrdom. Locks are placed at his altar representing a prayer request to end gossip, rumours, false testimonies and other sins of the tongue. The locks are used as a visible sign of such prayer request, which first and foremost must take place interiorly, a prayer to God through St. Raymond's intercession.

=== Iconography ===
Pictured in the habit of his order surrounded by ransomed slaves, with a padlock on his lips.

== In popular culture ==
The 2012 BBC drama series Call the Midwife features Nonnatus House, a convent of religious sisters of the Church of England; it is set in a deprived area of the East End of London in the 1950s to 1970s. The series is based on the successful memoir trilogy of the same title, in which the author Jennifer Worth used "Nonnatus House" as a pseudonym for the Anglican community of the Sisters of St John the Divine in Whitechapel, where she actually worked.

In the 2012 Christmas special, broadcast simultaneously on PBS in America, one of the plotlines features the discovery of an infant foundling on the convent doorstep, who is then dubbed Raymond by the nurses and sisters in honour of the closest male associated with his birth, the convent's patron.

== Sources ==
- Elizabeth Hallam (ed.), "Saints: Who They Are and How They Help You" (New York: Simon & Schuster, 1994), pg. 33.
- "Lives of the Saints, For Every Day of the Year, edited by Rev. Hugo Hoever, S.O.Cist., Ph.D., New York: Catholic Book Publishing Co., June 1, 1955, pg. 344
