= Duncan Barrett =

British writer and historian (born 1983)

Duncan Barrett FRHistS
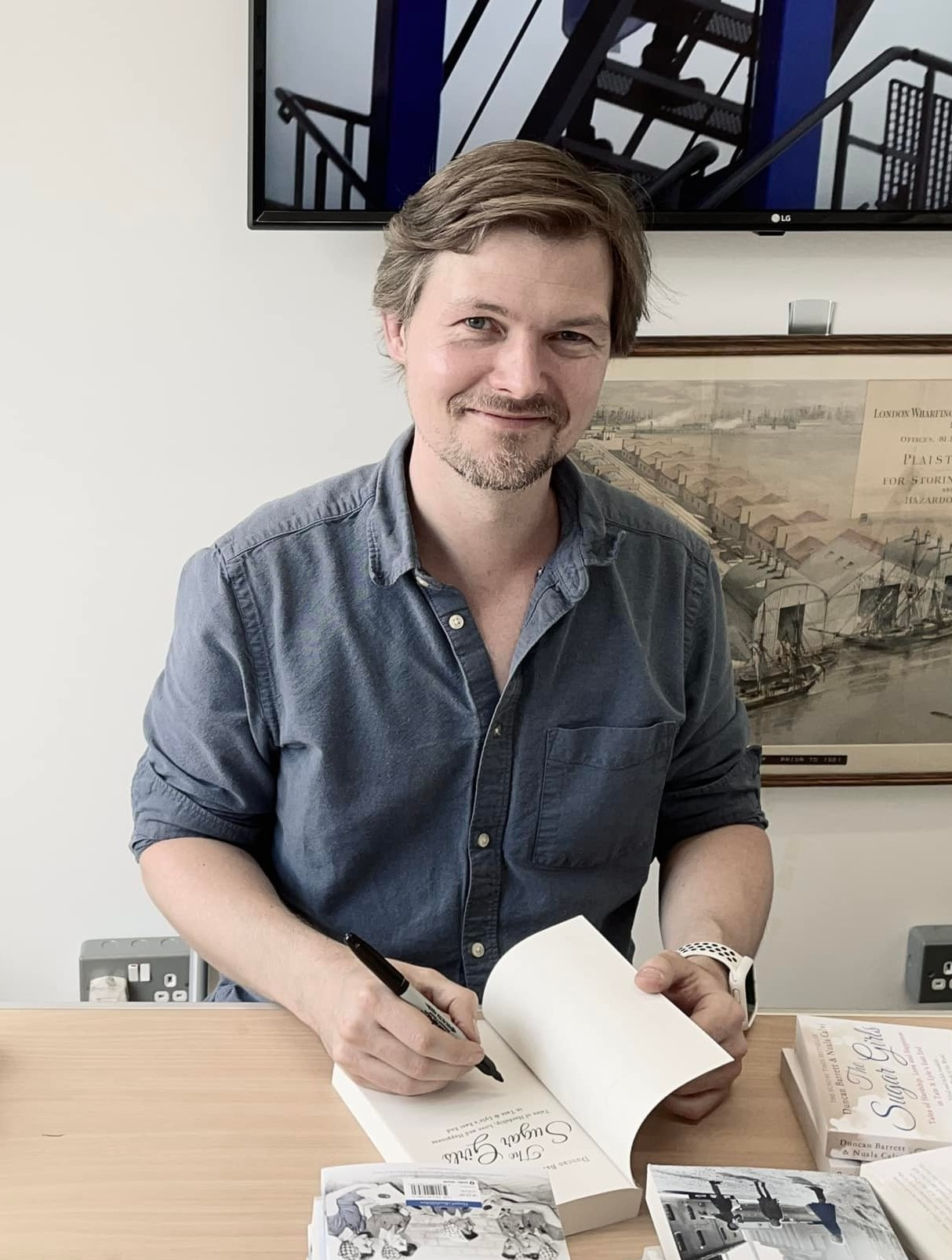
- Barrett at a book-signing in 2022
- Born: Duncan Barrett; 1983 (age 42–43); London, England
- Occupations: Writer and historian
- Mother: Michèle Barrett
- Writing career
- Genres: Biography, memoir
- Notable works: The Sugar Girls, GI Brides, Men of Letters, Blitz Kids
- Website: lifewriters.uk

Duncan Barrett (born 1983) is a British writer and historian, specialising in biography and memoir, and a fellow of the Royal Historical Society. After writing several books in collaboration with other authors, he published his first solo book, Men of Letters, in 2014.

Barrett also works as a journalist and podcast producer, and has previously worked as an actor and theatre director.

== Education ==
Duncan Barrett went to City of London School from 1994 to 2001, before studying English at Jesus College, Cambridge, where he served as the film editor of the student newspaper Varsity and directed plays starring Joe Thomas and Will Sharpe. He trained at the Royal Central School of Speech and Drama, graduating in 2006.

== Books ==
Barrett is the co-author of Star Trek: The Human Frontier, written with his mother Michèle Barrett and published by Polity in 2000. He edited Vitali Vitaliev's travelogue Passport to Enclavia, published by Reportage Press in 2008.

Barrett was the editor of Ronald Skirth's memoir The Reluctant Tommy, published by Macmillan Publishers in 2010. The book was favourably reviewed by the Financial Times, Socialist Worker, and the Sunday Express. However, it was criticized from the granddaughter of one of Skirth's fellow soldiers, who questioned its accuracy. In a revised introduction to the paperback edition in 2011, Barrett defended the memoir, encouraging people to "read the book for yourself and make up your own mind who to believe."

In 2012, Collins published The Sugar Girls, a book co-written by Barrett with Nuala Calvi, telling the stories of women workers at Tate & Lyle's East End factories since World War II. It was a best-seller. In an article for History Workshop, Barrett wrote that, while their methodology was indebted to oral history, the book is a work of narrative non-fiction. The authors were inspired by Jennifer Worth's Call the Midwife. The book was accompanied by a blog, where Barrett and Calvi discussed broader issues of life and work in the East End of London during the period covered by the book, as well as posting photographs and audio clips of the women they interviewed.

In 2021, Barrett and Calvi took part in a short film made by Thames Festival Trust called The Islanders, which also looked at the history of Tate & Lyle workers.

In 2013, Barrett and Calvi's second book together, GI Brides, was published by Harper, based on interviews with British women who married Americans during the Second World War. It was a Sunday Times best-seller. The following year, a US edition of the book made The New York Times nonfiction bestseller list.

In 2014, Barrett's first solo book, Men of Letters, was published by AA Publishing. The book tells the story of the Post Office Rifles during the First World War.

Barrett and Calvi's third collaboration for HarperCollins, The Girls Who Went to War, tells the stories of women who served in the British Army, Royal Navy, and Royal Air Force during the Second World War. The book was published on 7 May 2015, and launched the following day to commemorate the 70th anniversary of Victory in Europe Day. On 17 May 2015, it went into the Sunday Times bestseller list at number 6.

In 2018, Barrett’s second solo book, Hitler’s British Isles, was published by Simon & Schuster, based on interviews he conducted with around 100 people who lived through the German occupation of the Channel Islands during the Second World War.

In 2019, Barrett and Calvi published Zippy and Me, the autobiography of Rainbow puppeteer Ronnie Le Drew, with crowd-funding publisher Unbound.

In 2024, Barrett and Calvi’s book The Sugar Girls of Love Lane was published by Simon & Schuster, a follow-up to The Sugar Girls focusing on Henry Tate’s original Liverpool sugar refinery.

In 2025, Barrett and Calvi's book Blitz Kids was published by Headline to commemorate the 80th anniversary of VE Day.

== Journalism ==
Barrett has written for The Guardian, the Daily Express, the Los Angeles Times, Fox News, and the Evening Standard.

== Podcasts ==
Barrett co-produced the twelve-part podcast series D-Day: The Tide Turns for Noiser Podcast Network, narrated by Paul McGann. It was selected as one of The Economist's top 10 podcasts of 2024.

Barrett wrote and co-produced the podcast series Titanic: Ship of Dreams, also narrated by Paul McGann and featuring contributions from his brother Stephen McGann, whose great-grandfather Jimmy was a coal trimmer onboard the ship. Also produced by Noiser, the series debuted in April 2025. It received mostly positive reviews in The Times and The Financial Times. In the New Statesman, Anna Leszkiewicz praised Barrett's script as "arresting and immediate." It was shortlisted for two British Podcast Awards, and was chosen by The Atlantic as one of the 20 best podcasts of 2025, as well as by Apple as a top 10 podcast of the year in both the United Kingdom and Ireland.

In April 2025, Barrett chaired an event as part of HistFest at the British Library featuring Stephen McGann and Stephanie Barczewski.

He has contributed scripts to other Noiser podcasts, including Short History Of..., Real Dictators, and Real Survival Stories, and served as producer on Charles Dickens Ghost Stories and Sherlock Holmes Short Stories.

== Teaching ==
Barrett taught courses on memoir and life-writing in Lewes, and at book festivals including the Jersey Festival of Words and the Guernsey Literary Festival.

In 2022, Barrett taught an online course for Domestika entitled "Writing a Non-fiction Book: Capture Real-life Experiences".

== Acting and directing ==
Barrett previously worked as an actor and theatre director. In 2003, he played Berowne in Love's Labour's Lost. In 2004, he directed All's Well That Ends Well at the Edinburgh Festival Fringe. In 2005 he played the title role in Shakespeare's Richard II at the festival. He played Frederick in a production of Aphra Behn's The Rover at the Edinburgh Fringe in 2006. Barrett is the director of the short film Exit Strategy (2010), adapted from Shakespeare's Troilus and Cressida. In 2007 he played John Walker in Eastern Angles' production of Arthur Ransome's We Didn't Mean to Go to Sea. In 2011 he played W. T. Tutte in the BBC's Code-breakers: Bletchley Park's Lost Heroes and in 2012 he played Paul Winder in National Geographic's Locked up Abroad.

== Bibliography ==
- Skirth, Ronald; Barrett, Duncan (2011). The Reluctant Tommy (2011 ed.). Pan Macmillan Limited. ISBN 9780330513746.
- Barrett, Duncan; Calvi, Nuala (2012). The Sugar Girls. London: HarperCollins. ISBN 9780007448470.
- Barrett, Duncan; Calvi, Nuala (2013). GI Brides. London: HarperCollins. ISBN 9780062328052.
- Barrett, Duncan (2014). Men of Letters. London: AA Publishing. ISBN 0749575204.
- Barrett, Duncan; Calvi, Nuala (2015). The Girls Who Went to War. London: HarperCollins. ISBN 9780007501229.
- Barrett, Duncan (2018). Hitler's British Isles. London: Simon & Schuster. ISBN 9781471166372.
- Le Drew, Ronnie; Barrett, Duncan; Calvi, Nuala (2019). Zippy and Me: My Life Inside Britain's Most Infamous Puppet. London: Unbound. ISBN 9781783526987.
- Barrett, Duncan; Calvi, Nuala (2024). The Sugar Girls of Love Lane. London: Simon & Schuster. ISBN 9781471148170.
- Barrett, Duncan; Calvi, Nuala (2025). Blitz Kids: True Stories from the Children of Wartime Britain. London: Headline. ISBN 978-1-4722-8598-0.
