= Michèle Barrett =

English sociologist and author (born 1949)

Michèle Barrett FAcSS
- Born: Michèle Veronica Barrett; 1949 (age 76–77)
- Education: University of Durham; University of Sussex; City University, London
- Occupations: Academic; feminist; writer
- Employer: Queen Mary University of London
- Notable work: Women's Oppression Today; The Anti-Social Family
- Children: Duncan Barrett

Michèle Veronica Barrett (born 1949) is an English sociologist, feminist theorist and literary critic. She is an emeritus professor of modern literary and cultural theory at Queen Mary University of London, after starting her academic career at City University, London. She was President of the British Sociological Association and was elected a Fellow of the Academy of Social Sciences.

As a socialist feminist, Barrett is best known for her books Women's Oppression Today (1980), which attempted to reconcile feminist and Marxist analyses, and The Anti-Social Family (1982), which was written with Mary McIntosh. By the 1990s she had moved away from Marxism towards post-structural feminism and literary theory. Her work as a literary critic largely focuses on the life and works of Virginia Woolf. She is also a scholar of social history, including the experiences of servicemen in World War I.

== Education and career ==
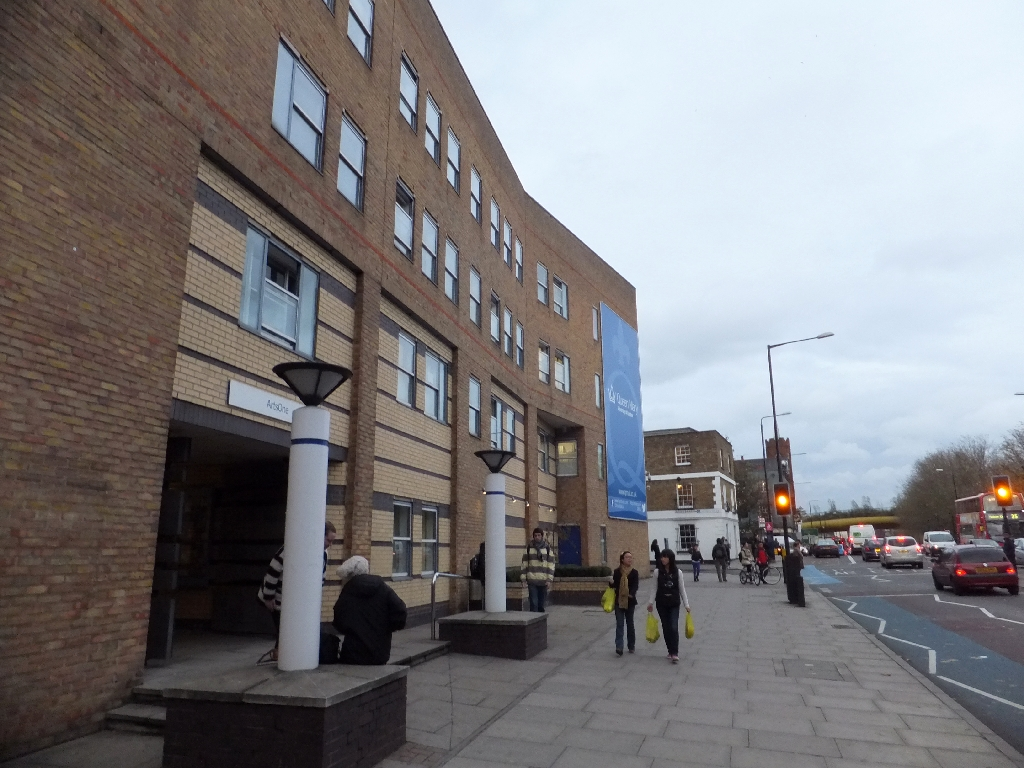
The ArtsOne building, where the then School of English and Drama was based at the Mile End campus of Queen Mary University of London

Barrett received a BA in sociology from the University of Durham, then a Master of Arts and a DPhil (1976) from the University of Sussex, focussing on Virginia Woolf. She lectured at City University, London from 1975 for 25 years, moving to Queen Mary University of London in 2000.

In 1979, she was a founding member of the Feminist Review collective. She has served on many other editorial boards and as a book editor.

Barrett was president of the British Sociological Association from 1993 to 1995. In that role, she told The Independent that "the old categories of class, individual and nation-state no longer seem useful. [Sociologists are] having to develop a new vocabulary and set of concepts, and in a time of flux we've been silenced."

Barrett became "well-known as an influential socialist feminist." She began her career using Marxist analysis, but moved away from it towards post-structuralism during the 1980s. Judith Stacey, looking back on a conversation with Barrett in the 1990s, described how Barrett moved away from Marxism and sociology towards literary and cultural studies. Labour historian Bryan Palmer commented: "Once committed to Marxism and materialist analysis, the Barrett of the late 1980s is a captive of the ideological ensemble of poststructuralist theoretical positions associated with the supposed political and cultural ruptures of post-modernism."

By the mid-1990s, Barrett had featured in three introductions to feminist literary criticism: Judith Newton and Deborah Rosenfelt's Feminist Criticism and Social Change (1985); Maggie Humm's A Reader's Guide to Contemporary Feminist Literary Criticism (1994); and Mary Eagleton's Feminist Literary Theory: A Reader (1996).

In 2013, the Academy of Social Sciences named her an Academician.

She was awarded a Leverhulme Research Fellowship in April 2016 to enable her study of Woolf. She appeared on In Our Time discussing Woolf in 2023.

== Publications ==
=== Sociology ===
Barrett's book Women's Oppression Today: Problems in Marxist Feminist Analysis was published by New Left Books in 1980.

The Anti-Social Family (Verso Books, 1982) co-authored with Mary McIntosh, "argued at length that rather than trying to promote or remake or reform the family we should consider alternatives to this form of private life".

In 1979 Barrett co-edited the book Ideology and Cultural Production with Philip Corrigan, Annette Kuhn, and Janet Wolff, which collected papers from a 1978 British Sociological Association conference on culture at the University of Sussex. Robert Neal Wilson concluded that "this collection does not hang together".

Barrett's Feminist Review article the same year with McIntosh, "Christine Delphy: Towards a Materialist Feminism?", was taken by Delphy as an attack not only on her ideas but herself, and to misrepresent her ideas. They questioned whether Delphy saw those in need of care as exploiters of women, to which Delphy rebutted that she viewed the men who would otherwise do the work of women as the exploiters.

Her 1980 lecture "Feminism and the Definition of Cultural Politics", proposed a decoupling of "women's art" and "feminist art" and questioned value judgements and the meaning of art.

Barrett's 1986 essay "Ideology and the Cultural Production of Gender", first published in the book Feminist Criticism and Social Change, "suggests new methods for studying relations between literature, gender ideology, and social change". She posits that "ideology is embedded historically in material practices but it does not follow either that ideology is theoretically indistinguishable from material practices or that it bears any direct relationship to them". Her book chapter the following year, "Marxist Feminism and the Work of Karl Marx" in Anne Phillips' Feminism and Equality, criticised Karl Marx for his "feet of clay" on women's issues, deriding his analysis as "scattered, scanty and unsatisfactory", lacking in comparison to his collaborator Friedrich Engels.

In 1989, she contributed the piece "Some Different Meanings of the Concept of 'Difference': Feminist Theory and the Concept of Ideology" to Alice Parker and Elizabeth Meese's book The Difference Within: Feminism and Critical Theory (John Benjamins), discussing how feminism has moved from an analysis of sex and gender difference to analysis of differences among women. She identified three differences, which have varying and contradictory theoretical implications: a psychoanalytical analysis of sex differentiation; a postional or relational difference deriving from Saussurian linguist theory; and the variety of lived experiences.

She co-edited a Verso book series, Questions for Feminism, with Annette Kuhn, Ann Rosalind Jones, and Anne Phillips. With Roberta Hamilton, she edited the book The Politics of Diversity: Feminism, Marxism and Nationalism (1986), which aimed to highlight the perceived benefits of Canadian feminist scholarship over its US and UK counterparts. Lillian Robinson said, "As its subtitle indicates, The Politics of Diversity assumes a Marxist analysis of social forces and institutions. ... The collection's Canadian provenance is responsible for the sophisticated level on which it engages the connections and contradictions between Marxism and feminism." R A Sydie said "this is a book that all Canadian feminists should have in their library". In 1993, with Anne Phillips she edited the book Destabilizing Theory: Contemporary Feminist Debates. Pamela Moore and Devoney Looser said it was "a fine collection of essays" of feminist theory, while Ramazanoglu said Barrett's piece "gives a succinct account of what it is about poststructuralism and postmodernism that is challenging to feminism". Linda McDowell discussed Barrett's "careful reflective piece on the cultural, 'deconstructive' turn in feminist theorizing".

Her 1992 book Politics of Truth: From Marx to Foucault (Cambridge Polity Press) examined whether the Marxist concept of ideology was still useful or whether post-structuralism's concepts of power and subjectivity should replace it.

In the same year, Barrett contributed a book review of psychoanalysis and feminism to the journal Signs with Judith Kegan Gardiner, Barrett providing a sociological and Gardiner a literary perspective. It was the first such two-field review commissioned by the journal.

Her 1999 book Imagination in Theory: Culture, Writing, Words, and Things is a collection of her essays from two decades of moving from Marxist sociology to post-Marxism. The introduction and two of ten essays are new material. Barrett said in one essay, "Postmodernism is not something that you can be for or against ... For it is a cultural climate as well as an intellectual position, a political reality as well as an academic fashion.” She pushed back against a perceived "aggressive anti-humanism" in post-structuralist theory in favour of allowing for the richness of human experience and beliefs. Charlie Gere said that "Barrett picks her way carefully but firmly through the minefield of modern theory, in which backing away from one potentially explosive location often risks backing onto another" and commented on how "Barrett's authentic voice permeates the volume". Jackie Orr favourably discussed the boundary-work, such as a fictional meeting of Woolf and Foucault, and concluded that "perhaps the theme of this collection really is Barrett's own impressive capacity for theoretical and political self-reflection and transformation." Woolf scholar Jeanette McVicker found the comparison of Woolf's and Foucault's understanding of truth unhelpful, as the "one-to-one correspondence" obscured wider similarities.

In a chapter in the 2000 book Understanding Contemporary Society (Sage, eds Browing, Halcli, and Webster), Barrett equated post-feminism with girl power, a restoration of femininity as opposed to "militant feminism"; she lampooned third-wave feminism as a form of girl power for grown-ups and used Kathryn Janeway from Star Trek: Voyager as an example of post-feminism.

=== Virginia Woolf ===
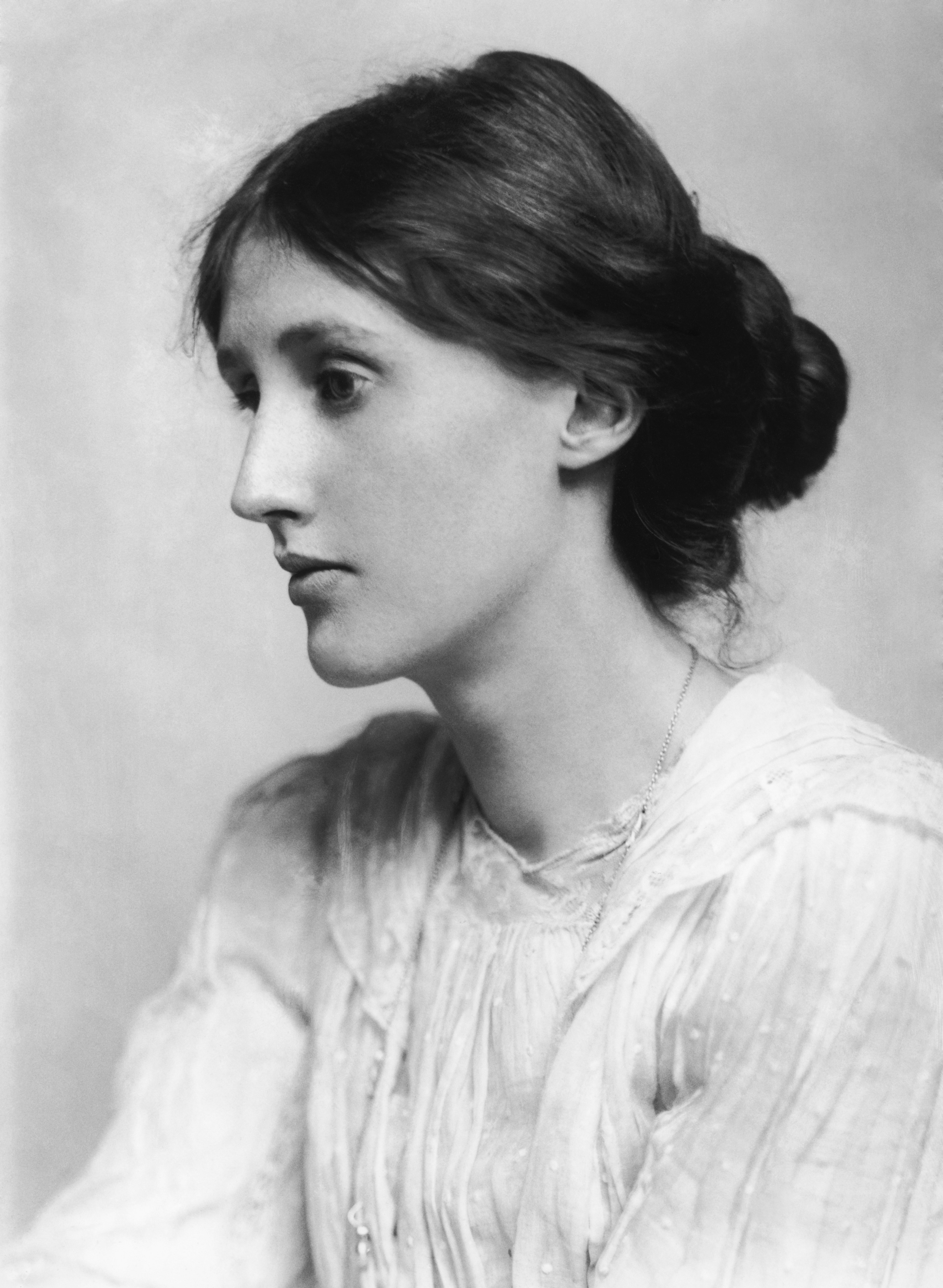
Virginia Woolf in 1902

In 1979 she wrote an introduction to a collection of Virginia Woolf's non-fiction, Virginia Woolf on Women and Writing: Her Essays, Assessments and Arguments. A.O. Frank commended her approach to "handl[ing] the connection between the fictional and non-fictional works."

In her 1993 introduction to a Penguin edition of Virginia Woolf's A Room of One's Own and it's "sequel", Three Guineas, Barrett compared the gender neutrality of the former with the focus on gender difference in the latter. Jane Marcus said Barrett "maintains a sceptical tone about Woolf's politics", criticising Woolf for not engaging with political movements and raising examples of snobbery and racism in her private writing.

In "Reason and Truth in A Room of One's Own: A Master in Lunacy", her contribution to the 2001 book Virginia Woolf Out of Bounds: Selected Papers from the Tenth Annual Conference on Virginia Woolf (edited by Jessica Berman and Jane Goldman), Barrett discusses Woolf's critique of the masculine authorial self, "logical and pedagogic", for which Woolf uses the image of I as a shadow or dark bar.

Her 2013 paper "Virginia Woolf's Research for Empire and Commerce in Africa (Leonard Woolf, 1920)" in Woolf Studies Annual said that Virginia's "knowledge and commitment to radical geopolitics and anti-imperialism" was greater than her husband Leonard's.

Barrett continued her work on Woolf in 2021 with a chapter in Historicizing Modernists: Approaches to ‘Archivalism’ (edited by Matthew Feldman, Anna Svendsen, and Erik Tonningon) about WoolfNotes, a website digitising Woolf's archive. She began the project in 2016 and it released 7000 digitised pages of Woolf's research and reading notes online in 2024.

=== Social history ===
With Peter Stallybrass, Barrett wrote a 2013 paper in Historical Writing Journal on the history of private use of printing and handwriting, noting that in the twentieth century the two were often combined such as in diaries and calendars and that the postcard created new forms of interpersonal communication.

She has also researched military life, including the role of African soldiers with the British army in World War I and how they were deliberately not commemorated by name by the Imperial War Graves Commission; she received the 2021 Queen Mary University of London Influence Award for this work. She published "Subalterns at War: First World War Colonial Forces and the Politics of the Imperial War Graves Commission" in Interventions in 2007 and "Death and the Afterlife: Britain's Colonies and Dominions" in Das' book Race, Empire and the First World War. Her 2008 book Casualty Figures (Verso) recounts the life of five WWI servicemen and their experiences of shell shock, The Telegraph warning that "This is not a book for the squeamish or the faint-hearted. The stories of these five men are real, unimaginable and highly personal." She discusses the lasting effects of trench warfare and how this has had insufficient attention.

== Personal life ==
Her son is historian Duncan Barrett, with whom she published Star Trek: The Human Frontier (Routledge) in 2000.

Academic offices
Preceded by John Westergaard	President of the British Sociological Association; 1993-1995	Succeeded by Stuart Hall
