= Men of letters =

Men of Letters may refer to:

- Man of letters, a type of intellectual
- Men of Letters, a 2014 book by Duncan Barrett
- Men of Letters, a fictional organization in the TV series Supernatural and The Winchesters
- English Men of Letters, a series of literary biographies published by Macmillan
