= Blitz Kids =

Blitz Kids may refer to:

- Blitz Kids (New Romantics), a group of people who frequented the Tuesday club-night at Blitz in Covent Garden, London, in 1979-80
- Blitz Kids (band), an English alternative rock band
- Blitz Kids (book), a 2025 book by Duncan Barrett and Nuala Calvi about children during the bombing of World War II
