= Lynne Segal =

Australian-British feminist academic

- Born: 29 March 1944 (age 82); Sydney, Australia
- Education: University of Sydney (BA); University of Sydney (PhD)
- Writing career
- Language: English
- Period: 1987–present
- Subjects: Psychology, gender studies, feminism
- Notable work: Why feminism?: gender, psychology, politics.
- Website: bbk.ac.uk/sps/our_staff/academic/lynne_segal

Lynne Segal (born 29 March 1944) is an Australian-born, British-based socialist feminist academic and activist, author of many books and articles, and participant in many campaigns, from local community to international. She has taught in higher education in London, England, since 1970, at Middlesex Polytechnic from 1973. In 1999, she was appointed Anniversary Professor of Psychology and Gender Studies at Birkbeck, University of London, where she now works in the School of Psychosocial Studies.

== Early life ==
Segal was born on 29 March 1944 in Sydney, Australia. Segal was born in a Jewish family to Iza and Reuben Segal, who were both physicians. Her brother Graeme is a mathematician and her sister Barbara is a baroque dancer. She studied psychology at Sydney University, obtaining her PhD in 1969, while becoming immersed in the anti-authoritarian milieu of the Sydney Libertarians (known as "The Push"), and has always remained within the libertarian wing of Left politics. She became pregnant in 1969 and married her husband, the artist James Clifford, who later came out as gay.

== Activism ==
She emigrated to London in 1970 and for the next decade her main energies went into grass roots politics in Islington, North London, helping to set up and run a women's centre, an alternative newspaper, the Islington Gutter Press, and supporting anti-racist politics. It was a decade in which the extra-party Left was on the ascendant, but divided structurally and ideologically.

In 1979, the three friends, Segal, Sheila Rowbotham and Hilary Wainwright wrote Beyond the Fragments, arguing for broader alliances among trade unionists, feminists and left political groups. Its argument quickly won a large following leading to a major conference in Leeds, Yorkshire, in 1980 and a second edition in 1981. In 1984, publisher Ursula Owen invited her to join the Virago Advisory Board and write an appraisal of the state of feminism, resulting in her first book, Is the Future Female? Troubled Thoughts on Contemporary Feminism. This book reached a broad audience, with its questioning of gender mythologies, whether of women's intrinsic virtues, or men's inevitable rapaciousness, which had been appearing in the work of many popular feminist writers in the 1980s.

Reflecting her socialist feminist milieu, Segal argued that feminists always needed to confront the ubiquitous negation of the "feminine", but women's battles could neither be reduced simply to battles with men, nor solved purely by revaluing the "feminine". All Segal's consequent books have argued for a more inclusive form of left-feminism, arguing for a more compassionate and egalitarian world. Her next book, Slow Motion: Changing Masculinities, Changing Men, rejected the equating of "male sexuality" with "male violence", noting the complexity of forces generating very differing patterns of masculinity across time and place. Discussing the volatile fluidity of sexual experience, the same theoretical perspectives appeared in Straight Sex: The Politics of Pleasure. There she deconstructs the notion of male activity and female passivity that underpin normative understandings of heterosexuality, and serve to shore up the language and practices of male dominance. In 2007, Segal published Making Trouble: Life and Politics, a Political Memoir, covering her generation of post-war activists, pondering what has become of their politics in the grimmer, more divided world of the 21st century.

She has a son, Zim Segal, working in web technology. Segal has lived in Islington, North London, since she arrived from Sydney. Since 2000, she has worked, as a secular Jew, with Jews for Justice for Palestinians, Independent Jewish Voices and Faculty for Israeli–Palestinian Peace (FFIPP) engaged in efforts to end the Israeli occupation of Palestinian land and create a just peace between Israel and Palestine.

== Political views ==
Segal is a Labour Party member of the Islington North Constituency Labour Party, in the Highbury East branch.

== Bibliography ==
=== Books ===
- Rowbotham, Sheila; Segal, Lynne; Wainwright, Hilary (1981). Beyond the fragments : feminism and the making of socialism (2nd ed.). London: Merlin Press. ISBN 9780850362541.
- Segal, Lynne (1983). What is to be done about the family. Harmondsworth: Penguin in association with the Socialist Society. ISBN 9780140065961.
- Segal, Lynne (1987). Is the future female? : troubled thoughts on contemporary feminism. London: Virago. ISBN 9780860686972.
- Segal, Lynne (1989). The Past Before Us: Twenty Years of Feminism. Feminist Review. ISBN 9780415037525.
- Segal, Lynne; McIntosh, Mary (1993). Sex exposed : sexuality and the pornography debate. New Brunswick, N.J: Rutgers University Press. ISBN 9780813519388.
- Segal, Lynne. Does pornography cause violence? The search for evidence in Church Gibson, Pamela; Gibson, Roma (1993). Dirty looks : women, pornography, power. London: British Film Institute (BFI) Publishing. ISBN 9780851704043.
- Segal, Lynne (1994). Straight sex : rethinking the politics of pleasure. Berkeley: University of California Press. ISBN 9780520200012.
- Segal, Lynne, ed. (1997). New sexual agendas. Basingstoke: Macmillan. ISBN 0333675681.
- Segal, Lynne (1999). Why feminism? : gender, psychology, politics. Cambridge: Polity. ISBN 9780745623474.
- Segal, Lynne (2007). Slow motion : changing masculinities, changing men. Basingstoke: Palgrave Macmillan. ISBN 9780230019270.
- Segal, Lynne (2007). Making trouble : life and politics. London: Serpent's Tail. ISBN 9781852429379.
- Segal, Lynne; Elaine Showalter (Introduction) (2013). Out of Time: The Pleasures and Perils of Ageing. London: Verso Books. ISBN 9781781681398.
- Segal, Lynne (2017). Radical Happiness : Moments of Collective Joy. London: Verso Books. ISBN 9781786631541.
- Segal, Lynne (2023). Lean on Me: A Politics of Radical Care. London: Verso Books. ISBN 9781804292945.

=== Articles ===
- Segal, Lynne (1992). "Feminism and fatherhood". The School Field. 3 (1/2): 95–118. ISSN 0353-6807.
- Segal, Lynne (16 January 2001). "Boys' success at school is undermined by the same competitive machismo that dominates the ideas of many male academics". The Guardian, Education. London.
- Segal, Lynne (13 February 2001). "We would all be better off if academics wrote fewer but better books, argues Lynne Segal". The Guardian, Education. London.
- Segal, Lynne (13 March 2001). "Getting beyond truisms is still the greatest task facing psychology". The Guardian, Education. London.
- Segal, Lynne (10 April 2001). "Where have all the radicals gone?". The Guardian, Education. London.
- Baron-Cohen, Simon; Segal, Lynne (3 May 2003). "Sex on the mind (e-mail exchange)". The Guardian. London.
- Segal, Lynne (2014). "Temporal Vertigo: The Paradoxes of Ageing". Studies in Gender and Sexuality. 15 (3): 214–222. doi:10.1080/15240657.2014.939022. ISSN 1524-0657. S2CID 143705554.
