= Orán Airport =

Airport in Argentina

- IATA: ORA; ICAO: SASO

Summary
- Airport type: Public
- Location: Orán, Argentina
- Elevation AMSL: 1,168 ft / 356 m
- Coordinates: 23°09′10″S 64°19′45″W

Map
- Location in Argentina

Runways
Direction	Length		Surface
Direction	m	ft	Surface
01/19	1,473	4,833	Asphalt
- Sources: WAD Google Maps SkyVector

Orán Airport (IATA: ORA, ICAO: SASO) is an airport serving Orán, a city in the agricultural valley of the Bermejo River in the Salta Province of Argentina. The airport is within the southern boundaries of the city.

The Oran non-directional beacon (Ident: ORA) is located on the field.

== See also ==
- Transport in Argentina
- List of airports in Argentina
