= Ronald Skirth =

Conscientious objector of the First World War

John Ronald Skirth
- Born: John Ronald Skirth; 11 December 1897; Chelmsford, Essex, England
- Died: 1977 (aged 79–80)
- Military career
- Allegiance: United Kingdom
- Branch: British Army
- Service years: 1916–1919
- Rank: Bombardier
- Service number: 120331
- Units: 293 Siege Battery, Royal Garrison Artillery
- Conflicts: First World War: Western Front; Battle of Messines; Battle of Passchendaele; Italian Front; Second Battle of the Piave River

John Ronald Skirth (11 December 1897 – 1977) was a British soldier who served in the Royal Garrison Artillery during the First World War.

His experiences during the Battle of Messines and the Battle of Passchendaele, both in 1917, led him to resolve not to take human life, and for the rest of his army service he made deliberate errors in targeting calculations to try to ensure the guns of his battery missed their aiming point on the first attempt, giving the enemy a chance to evacuate.

Many years later, after retiring from a career as a teacher, he wrote a memoir of his years in the army, describing his disillusionment with the conduct of the war and his conversion to pacifism. In 2010 the memoir was published as The Reluctant Tommy, edited by Duncan Barrett.

== Early life and war service ==
Skirth was born in Chelmsford and grew up in Bexhill-on-Sea. In the First World War, having volunteered for the British Army under the Derby Scheme, and having requested that the process be expedited, he was called up in October 1916, two months before his 19th birthday. He became a Battery Commander's Assistant in the Royal Garrison Artillery, responsible for making the calculations necessary to target the large guns of a field battery. When he argued with a superior officer over whether to use a French church for target practice he was demoted in rank from Corporal to Bombardier. (Note: In a review published by the History Department of Michigan State University, Ian McCulloch of the Canadian Forces College described Michele Barrett's Casualty Figures: How Five Men Survived the First World War as "poorly researched")

Skirth saw action in the Battle of Messines, in which two of his closest friends, Bill and Geordie, were killed. On the same day he had an "epiphany" when he stumbled across the body of a dead German of about his own age, and realised that one of the shells he had targeted might well have killed him. This was to mark a turning point in his thinking about the war as he determined that he was morally responsible for his actions and for their consequences, despite the chain of command.

During the Battle of Passchendaele, Skirth and another friend, Jock Shiels, left their post when they discovered that their commanding officer had ignored an order to withdraw from the front line. Skirth was knocked out by a shell which killed Shiels, and subsequently suffered from shell-shock and amnesia. Following a period of convalescence in hospital in France, he was sent to the Italian Front in December 1917, where his battery was being reorganised. There, following a relapse of shell-shock, he was treated in hospital in Schio and at the mud spa at Montegrotto.

In Italy, Skirth made a resolution that he would do everything within his power to avoid further loss of human life. He felt that the "just war" he had signed up for was anything but just, and was disillusioned with the army and the conduct of the war. In a church in the Italian village of San Martino, near Vicenza, he made a private pact with God that he would never again help to take a human life. He wrote to his future wife, Ella Christian, claiming that he had become a pacifist and a conscientious objector. He also began a campaign of small acts of sabotage, introducing minor errors into his trajectory calculations so as to mistarget the guns, such that they "never once hit an inhabited target" on the first attempt, giving the enemy a chance to evacuate. His actions were never discovered by his superiors.

Apparently he carried out this sabotage while still in Italy where he remained until February 1919, aside from a fortnight of leave back in England in November and December 1918. He received the British War Medal and Victory Medal for his war service but declined the Military Medal, which he felt was offered as part of an attempt to whitewash a fatal accident he had tried to prevent.

== Later life ==
In September 1919 Skirth returned to England, to commence teacher training, for which he had signed up before leaving to serve in the army. He trained in London, and after graduating taught briefly at a school in Bexhill-on-Sea, before transferring in 1922 to a post at a school in Uxbridge.

In 1923 he and Ella Christian became engaged and the following year, after Skirth secured a job at the Little Ealing Senior Boys' School and found a flat they could share in Ealing, they married, on 29 December 1924, at the Church of St Barnabus in Bexhill. In September 1929 their only child was born, a daughter whom they named Jean. (They had expected a boy, who would have been called John.)

During the Second World War, the family was evacuated to South Wales with Skirth’s school. In his forties by this point and suffering from ill health, he was not expected to fight, but his anti-war views earned him the labels "crank, visionary, communistic and impractical".

After the war, the family returned to Ealing, where Skirth and his wife Ella lived, in various homes, throughout their life together, and where he continued to work as a teacher until he took early retirement in 1958. He died there in 1977.

== Character and beliefs ==
A self-confessed 'dreamer' with a romantic sensibility, Skirth was very fond of literature, and in particular poetry; he took with him to the Western Front a much-annotated copy of Francis Turner Palgrave's Golden Treasury. His favourite poets were John Keats, Percy Bysshe Shelley and Lord Byron. He had an intense love of beauty, which he found all around him in music, architecture and the natural world. On the Western Front, he wrote, he was "deprived of the one thing that to me was as precious as life itself, my love of beauty".

Although Skirth had volunteered for the Army in 1915, as an idealistic patriot, convinced that "King and Country" were causes worth fighting for, it was not long before he became disillusioned with the war and the army. He attributed this to a combination of his sensitive character, his Christian upbringing and sense of right and wrong, and, most significantly, the horror of his war experiences.

After the war, Skirth remained a convinced pacifist for the rest of his life. He believed that Britain should not have declared war on Germany in 1939 and claimed that he would rather surrender and face occupation than take up arms against a hostile force. Writing in the early 1970s, he expressed hope that the next generation of political leaders would not make the same mistakes as their forebears.

== Memoir ==
In January 1971, having retired from his teaching career, Skirth began work on a handwritten memoir which described his conduct and experiences during the First World War, and in particular his experience of disillusionment. Although he initially intended to focus on his relationship with his wife Ella, touching on the war only briefly, he soon felt under a "compulsion" to write more about his war experiences. He worked on the memoir for over a year, eventually filling five green ring binders with many hundreds of pages, and over the next few years, despite suffering two strokes, he repeatedly went back to the material, editing, amending and adding to what he had written.

Skirth gave the memoir to his daughter Jean in 1975, two years before his death in 1977. Although for many years she found it too upsetting to read in full, she felt that it was a story that should be shared with others, and in 1999 she donated four of the five ring binders, containing the bulk of the memoir but excluding its more personal sections, to the Imperial War Museum in London, where they remain to this day.

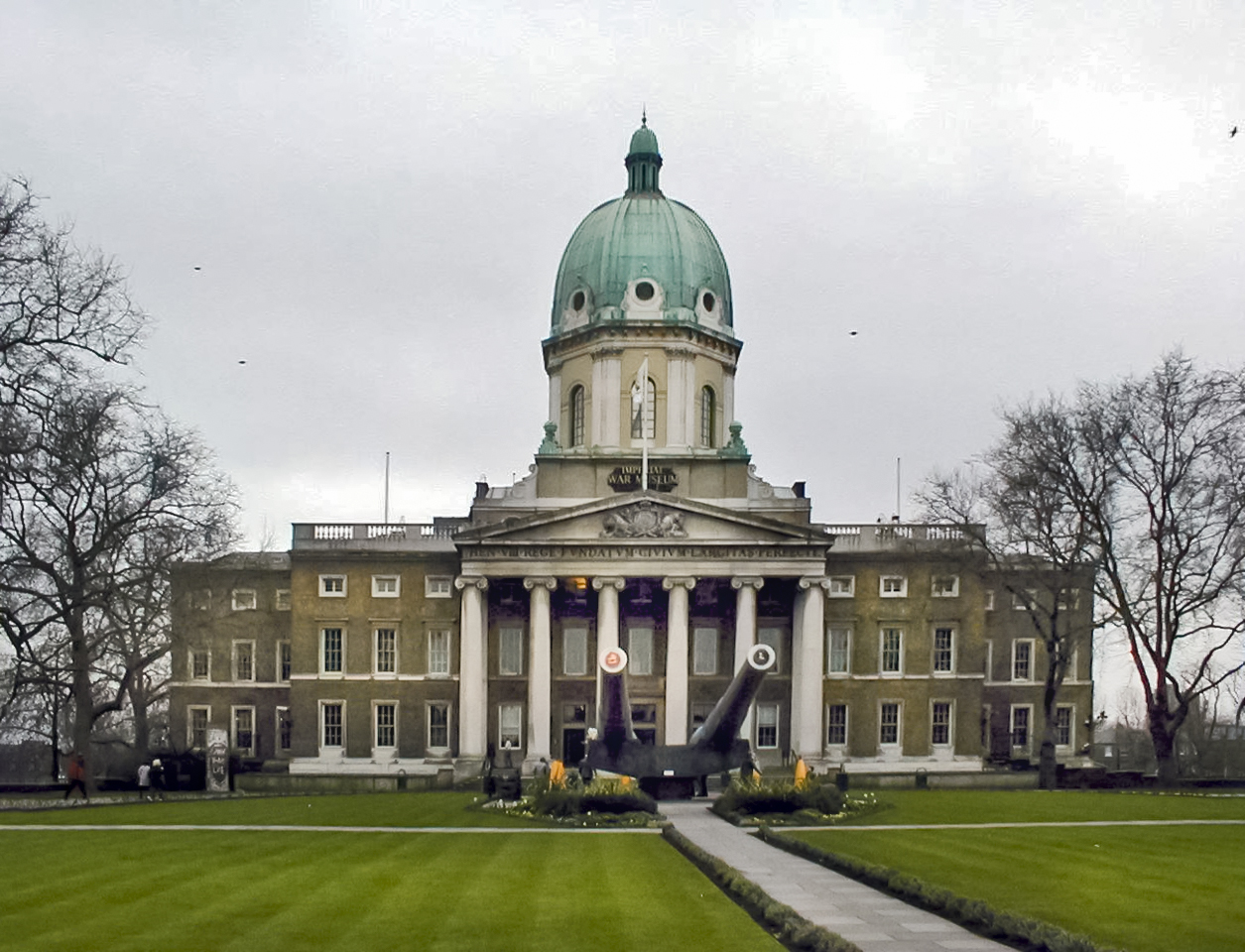
The Imperial War Museum, London

Once it was made available to researchers and academics, Skirth's memoir began to attract attention, and his story was featured in Richard Schweitzer's The Cross and the Trenches (2003), Michele Barrett's Casualty Figures (2007), and in Ian Hislop's documentary Not Forgotten: The Men Who Wouldn't Fight (2008), in which Hislop interviewed Jean Skirth about her father's war experiences.

=== Publication ===
In 2010 the memoir was published in book form by Macmillan, as The Reluctant Tommy: Ronald Skirth's Extraordinary Memoir of the First World War, edited by Duncan Barrett. Barrett wrote in an introduction that he felt that Skirth's story "deserved as wide an audience as possible—and to be read in its protagonist's own words". Skirth's daughter Jean, who had given permission for the memoir to be published remained uncertain whether publishing the memoir was what her father would have wanted, but believed that it was important that his story should be widely known. The book carried a foreword by Channel 4 News anchor Jon Snow, in which he wrote about his grandfather Lieutenant-General Sir Thomas D'Oyly Snow. Referring to the popular description of the lower ranks as "lions led by donkeys", Snow acknowledged that "If Ronald Skirth was a 'lion', Thom Snow was ultimately a 'donkey'."

=== Critical reaction ===
The Reluctant Tommy received largely favourable reviews by Richard Holmes in the Evening Standard and Jonathan Gibbs in the Financial Times, as well as coverage in Socialist Worker and, in an article written by the book's editor, the Sunday Express.

[An] important contribution to the literature of the war ... a remorseless condemnation of war and support for the stance of the absolute pacifist ... I would certainly buy this book even if I had not been sent a review copy, and whenever I get too misty-eyed about officer-man relationships I shall reread it to remind me of how badly things could go wrong. And of just how vital it is, for any democratic society seeking to use war as an instrument of policy, to ensure that the connection between war's means and its political ends is crystal clear.

— Richard Holmes, Evening Standard

Skirth’s writing may be uneven but it carries the unmistakable tenor of honesty and true belief, not least in his disgust at the behaviour of many of his superiors. His descriptions of seeing his friends gassed and blown to bits are moving as much for what he can’t bring himself to write, as for what he can. The book began as the story of his marriage to the girl who waited for him back home, and that sense of a happy ending shines through even the bleakest moments.

— Jonathan Gibbs, Financial Times

Not all criticism has been favourable. A review in the BBC's Who Do You Think You Are magazine remarks on the disparities between official war records and Skirth's version of events:

He movingly describes two friends and an officer being killed on Messines Ridge on 8th June 1917—but the unit war diary notes no casualties and the named officer isn't on the Commonwealth War Graves Register. In November 1917 he says his battery was so far forward that they were ordered to withdraw and his insane CO refused to leave—Skirth claims to have disobeyed his direct order and fled with his pal Jock Shiels—yet according to the CWG Register, John Shiels of 293 Battery RGA was killed on 18th July 1917. When the battery is later sent to Italy, Skirth is quite clear that it was without guns as late on as April 1918. The war diary, on the other hand, records them firing bombardments on numerous occasions. The overall impression he gives of the tiny scale of one man caught up in a huge and apparently indifferent military machine in a war like none previous is impressive – but should be treated with great caution as factual history.

In response to general criticism received after initial publication that Skirth was a liar or a fantasist, Barrett revised his introduction to the paperback edition, published in 2011. He recognised that there were discrepancies between Skirth's account and historical sources which made his book an unreliable history, but still considered the book a valuable memoir of one man's personal experiences.

In 2011, The Sunday Times reported that Skirth had been "...exposed for character assassination..." and that the Imperial War Museum, which had held Skirth's memoirs since 1999, "...has admitted they are mostly fictional". The report was based on research begun by Ruth Ward as part of a campaign to clear the name of her grandfather, Bernard Bromley, who had served with Skirth and whose character Skirth had besmirched. Ward's research, which was lodged with the Imperial War Museum when it was completed in 2014, identified significant discrepancies in Skirth's account. It revealed differences in the biographical information of characters and in events described by Skirth when compared to official historical sources. Ward concludes that "Skirth's war memoir was not a genuine account, or a semi-fictional one, but a satire" which "unfairly represented genuine figures" to "subtly and implicitly" ridicule the shortcomings of the British Army.
