= Community of St. John the Divine =

Anglican religious order of nuns

The Community of St. John the Divine (CSJD) is an Anglican religious order of nuns within the Church of England. Founded in London in 1848, the community is now based in Marston Green, Solihull, England. Originally a nursing order, the CSJD continues to be involved in areas of health and pastoral care, and operates retreat facilities.

Author Jennifer Worth wrote about her work with the order in the 1950s in her Call The Midwife trilogy. The order was named "Sisters of St. Raymond Nonnatus" in the book, as well as the subsequent Call The Midwife television series on the BBC.

== History ==
In 1848, physician Robert Bentley Todd founded St. John's House to improve nursing in London's hospitals. The Sisters of St. John oversaw the training of secular nurses for both King's College Hospital in London and for private district nursing. According to historian Carol Helmstadter, Saint John's House's training of nurses was the first to be systematic and to provide trained nurses for hospitals.
