= Star Trek: The Human Frontier =

Star Trek: The Human Frontier is a non-fiction book about Star Trek by mother-son co-authors Michèle Barrett and Duncan Barrett. It was published by Routledge in 2000.

Gary Westfahl said that most will find it "an entertaining and enlightening journey" that is "unusually readable", but critiqued a lack of analysis of the sci-fi roots of the franchise and their neglect of the original series. Ann Kaloski-Naylor said it is "a persuasive and at times engrossing analysis of, in particular, three main themes: Star Trek as sea voyage; Star Trek as an interrogation of humanness; and Star Trek as a postmodern destabilizing of identity."

Santa Monica College students who studied the science fiction television series Star Trek in 2002, not only watched episodes of the show but also engaged in readings of the Barrett book.
