= Shadows of the Workhouse =

2005 book by Jennifer Worth

- Author: Jennifer Worth
- Language: English
- Subject: Workhouse Life
- Genre: Social history
- Set in: London
- Publisher: Weidenfeld & Nicolson
- English publication date: 2005
- Media type: Print
- Preceded by: Call the Midwife
- Followed by: Farewell to the East End

Shadows of the Workhouse is a 2005 book by British author Jennifer Worth (1935-2011). It formed the basis for the second series of the television drama Call the Midwife.

== Setting ==
Although Britain's workhouses were officially abolished in 1930, many did not close their doors until much later. Renamed Public Assistance Institutions, they continued under the control of county councils. At the outbreak of the Second World War in 1939 almost 100,000 people were accommodated in former workhouses, including 5,000 children. It was not until the 1948 National Assistance Act that the last traces of the Poor Law disappeared, and with them the workhouses.

Subsequently, until the end of the 20th century and early years of the 21st, there were still many people who had lasting memories of life in the workhouses, some as young adults, others who had been born there or sent as orphans. Worth based her book on the lives of such people, many of whom she met through her work as a midwife in London's East End during the 1950s and 1960s.

== Characters ==
- Jane
- Sir Ian Astor-Smaleigh
- Frank
- Peggy
- Sister Monica Joan
- Aunt Anne
- Joseph Collett
- Chummy Browne (Camilla Fortescue-Cholmeley-Browne), a very tall, upper-class young nurse
- Cynthia Miller, a kind and thoughtful young nurse
- Trixie Franklin, a fun-loving young nurse
- Sister Julienne
- Sister Evangelina
- Novice Ruth
- Sir Lorimer Elliott-Bartram

== Reception ==
- Worth is indeed a natural storyteller and her detailed account of being a midwife in London's East End is gripping, moving and convincing from beginning to end...a powerful evocation of a long-gone world. — David Kynaston in Literary Review
- Worth's book made me cry in a railway carriage... — Matthew Parris in The Spectator
