= Politics of Truth =

Politics of Truth: From Marx to Foucault is a non-fiction book by Michèle Barrett, published in 1992 by Polity Press.

== Synopsis ==
It examined whether the Marxist concept of ideology was still useful or whether post-structuralism's concepts of power and subjectivity should replace it. Barrett had moved from the "scientific" position of Althusser to the discourse approach of Foucault.

== Reviews ==
According to Miriam Adelman, Barrett commented on how "critical theory ... gradually frees itself from restrictive Marxist language and concepts and in doing so, undergoes a paradigm change". Barrett describes how "plural constructed heritages" contribute to scholarly fields and cautions against "disciplinary policing". Martin Gardiner said it was "an engaging and at times impassioned read". Renate Bridenthal was critical of what she saw as a muddled review of Marxist views of ideology and namedropping, concluding that "Failing an original thesis, the purpose and readership of this book are unclear", while Kate Soper said "Barrett is much more confident about the need to go beyond Marx than about what to put in his place". Gregor McLennan focussed on Barrett's work as an exemplary study of post-Marxism and its critique of reductionism and universalism, commenting that "her hesitations, to me, signal a commendable awareness" while calling Barrett's analysis superficial.
