= Call the Midwife (book) =

2002 memoir (first of three volumes) by Jennifer Worth

- First paperback edition, 2002 (Merton)
- Author: Jennifer Worth
- Language: English
- Genre: Memoir
- Publisher: Merton Books (2002); Orion (UK, 2007)
- Publication date: 2002 / 2007
- Publication place: United Kingdom
- Media type: Print
- Pages: 368
- ISBN: 0-7538-2383-7
- Followed by: Shadows of the Workhouse

Call the Midwife, later called Call the Midwife: A True Story of the East End in the 1950s, is a memoir by Jennifer Worth, and the first in a trilogy of books describing her work as a district nurse and midwife in the East End of London during the 1950s. Worth wrote the book after retiring from a subsequent career as a musician, and it was originally published in July 2002. Reissued in 2007, it became a bestseller, as did the sequel Shadows of the Workhouse (2005, reissued 2008) and the final volume Farewell to the East End (2009). By the time of Jennifer Worth’s death in June 2011, her books had already sold almost a million copies. In 2012, the popular BBC/PBS adaptation of the trilogy boosted sales further, and all four of the author's books about the East End (the "Midwife trilogy" and In the Midst of Life (2010)) went back into the charts.

== Background ==
Worth wrote the book in response to an article by Terri Coates in the Royal College of Midwives Journal, which argued that midwives had been under-represented in literature and called on "a midwife somewhere to do for midwifery what James Herriot did for vets". Worth wrote the first volume of her memoirs by hand and sent them to Coates to read; Coates later served as advisor on the books and the TV adaptation.

== Setting ==
The book is set in Poplar, in the East End of London, where "Jenny Lee" (Worth’s maiden name) works as a midwife and district nurse, attached to a convent, Nonnatus House (a pseudonym for the Community of St. John the Divine, where Worth actually worked). The story is split between chapters describing individual mothers and their often-traumatic deliveries, and more light-hearted incidents back at the convent. As well as the name of the convent, names of the characters are generally pseudonymous, with the exception of Cynthia, who remained a close friend of Jennifer Worth's in later life.

== Characters ==
- Jenny Lee, the author
- Jane, the extremely shy medical orderly
- Chummy Browne (née Camilla Fortescue-Cholmeley-Browne), a very tall, upper-class young nurse
- Cynthia Miller, a kind and thoughtful young nurse
- Trixie Franklin, a fun-loving young nurse
- Sister Julienne, the mother superior of the order of nuns
- Sister Evangelina, a rough-and-ready nun
- Sister Monica Joan, an elderly and eccentric nun struggling with the loss of an acute mind
- Sister Bernadette, a strict and dedicated midwife
- Novice Ruth, a young nurse and soon-to-be nun

== Influence ==
The success of Call the Midwife led publishers to release many similar real-life stories about nurses, midwives, and life in the East End of London in the 1950s, most notably Edith Cotterill’s Nurse on Call (Ebury, 2010), (Note: Cotterill's book was originally published by the Black Country Society in 1973 under the title A Black Country Nurse at Large. It was subsequently revised and republished by Century Hutchinson in 1986. The Ebury Press publication of 2010 is the one prompted by the success of Call the Midwife.) and Dot May Dunn’s midwife memoir Twelve Babies on a Bike (Orion, 2010). They both went into the Sunday Times bestseller lists. Some writers acknowledged the inspiration they took from Worth’s writing – Duncan Barrett and Nuala Calvi, authors of The Sugar Girls, wrote that their "aim was to capture a lost way of life, just as Jennifer Worth had done", describing the midwife books as their "touchstone".

== Critical reaction ==
- Worth's powers of description, authenticity of detail and richness of characterisation evoke from the start an unforgettable milieu – Poplar and the London docklands of the mid to late 1950s – to which I and clearly many thousands of other readers willingly and completely surrendered. — David Kynaston in The Guardian
- Worth tells it like it is; and her brisk frankness about birth, copulation and death can make Irvine Welsh read like Barbara Cartland. If you don't care for the details of terrified teens at full term, or botched abortions, look away now. Her compassion and anger drive the shock and gore. — Boyd Tonkin in The Independent
