= Marcelo Mendieta =

Argentine journalist

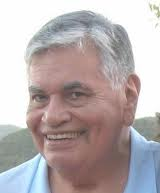
- Born: José Luis Marcelo Ventecol Mendieta; January 16, 1937 (age 89); Orán, Salta, Argentina
- Occupation: Journalist
- Children: María Esther Beatriz Ventecol Marcelo Mendieta (junior)
- Website: http://personalidadesdelarteuniversal.com/

José Luis Marcelo Ventecol Mendieta (born January 16, 1937) is an Argentine journalist. He was born on a farm in Orán, Salta, but was registered in the Civil Registry in Jujuy.

== Personal life ==
He grew up in Salta until, for work reasons, his parents moved to Jujuy – today San Salvador de Jujuy – in 1943. At the age of 13 he began to collaborate with LW8 Radio Jujuy. He later collaborated with the newspapers called Jujuy, Libertad and Pregón.

He is the father of Marcelo Mendieta (Jnr), journalist and author based in Buenos Aires and of María Esther Beatriz Ventecol, lawyer, of San Salvador de Jujuy, Jujuy, Argentina.

== Professional career ==
In 1956 he was schoolmaster at Rural School No. 109 in Las Escaleras, Jujuy, Argentina, however the following year he returned to journalism.

He was a founding member of the Jujuy Branch of the Argentine Society of Writers (Sociedad Argentina de Escritores – SADE) founded on June 13, 1957.

In August 1958, he moved to Buenos Aires, where he joined the legendary news agency Saporiti, directed by don Leandro Saporiti; at the time, it was among the oldest news agencies in the world. In November 1958, he was a member of the editorial board of the evening newspaper Correo de la Tarde, founded and directed by Francisco Manrique. In August 1959, he joined the newspaper La Nación, and was on its staff until his voluntary separation in March 1984. During that period, and afterwards as a “free-lance” journalist, he covered Latin America, the United States, Europe, the Middle East and China.

From 1972 to 1975 he was the Buenos Aires–based correspondent of the Argentine radio stations LV9 Radio Salta, of Salta; LT14 Radio Misiones of Posadas in Misiones; LW8 Radio Jujuy, of San Salvador de Jujuy; LU9 Radio Mar del Plata of Mar del Plata in the province of Buenos Aires; LV 16 Radio Río Cuarto of Río Cuarto, Cordoba and LU 22 Radio Tandil, of Tandil, province of Buenos Aires.

Between 1967 and 1992, he lectured on art, poetry, literature and experiences from visits to various cultural centers in Argentina, the People’s Republic of China and the Université de Technologie de Compiègne, (France).

The Academia Nacional de Medicina, Buenos Aires, Argentina, published the lecture which he gave about this institution in 1992 on the topic “The responsibility of the news media in self-medication: founding principles for International Medical Radio and TV, and some projections".

Between 1978 and 1982, he was press advisor to Tomás Orstein, president of Coca-Cola Export Corp. In this position, he was responsible for convening the contest “Coca-Cola in the Arts and Sciences”, and its national and international press coverage.

From November 1, 1994, he was international press advisor to Dr. René Favaloro in the Foundation that bears his name in Buenos Aires, Argentina.

== Publications ==
He collaborated with publications, both daily and weekly, and with press services of news agencies, both for radio and television in Argentina, Uruguay, Italy and the United States. As advisor to Dr. René Favaloro, he was responsible for the international media promotion of the Institute of Cardiology and Cardiovascular surgery of the Favaloro Foundation (1994/1995); from 1980 to 1999 he was director of Temas Edición Internacional, (Issues – International Edition) in Buenos Aires, Argentina; copies of this periodical can be found in the Congressional Library of the Nation in Buenos Aires, Argentina, in the Library of Congress Catalog in Washington DC, United States and in the University of Texas Libraries, Texas, United States, among others. From 1999 to 2002 he was co director and editor of Argentina Internacional.

Since October 29, 2000 until July 2007 he has been director and editor of ArgentinaUniversal.info, a portal which publishes cultural news, articles, commentaries and work in prose or verse, by dedicated authors and novelists from Hispanic America. From August 27, 2007, he has been editing Personalidades del Arte Universal (Personalities of Universal Art), a bilingual directory with free on-line registration for those who work in different disciplines of art in the world.

The Buenos Aires–based Banco de Boston Foundation (now Standard Bank Foundation) published in 1999 “Nicolás Cócaro, periodista” (“Nicolas Cocaro, Journalist”), which was co-authored with Silvia Vernengo Prack.

He is working on a book with interviews and commentaries by the personalities whom he has interviewed (Borges, Miguel Angel Asturias, Mika Waltari, Evtushenko, Artur Lundkvist, Édith Piaf, Jean Lartéguy, among others), as well as reproducing what he published in the daily newspaper La Nación of Buenos Aires, Argentina, La Mañana of Montevideo, Uruguay, and various news media. The book will be an anthology of tales and stories.

ADEPA (Asociación de Empresas Periodísticas Argentinas - Association of Journalistic Enterprises of Argentina), in 1964 awarded him Second Place in the National Prize for Journalism for his column “El Vía Crucis del Trámite” (The Via Crucis of Bureaucracy) published by the daily La Nación de Buenos Aires, Argentina. He has also won recognition for his dedication and devotion to promoting the well being of the community through journalism, through awards by various Argentine and international institutions.
