= The Anti-Social Family =

The Anti-Social Family is a non-fiction book by sociologists Michèle Barrett and Mary McIntosh, published by Verso Books in 1982.

== Synopsis ==
The book "argued at length that rather than trying to promote or remake or reform the family we should consider alternatives to this form of private life". The book contradicted a then-prevalent idealisation of the nuclear family, instead proposing – taking inspiration from Marx and Engels – that collective structures in society should make the family unnecessary. They say the family is anti-social because family inheritance enforces inequality, family support undermines wider social responsibility, family is patriarchal, coercive, and condemns women to the "tyranny of motherhood", and family undermines female sexuality. They noted the exclusion of lesbian women from being mothers and the stigmatisation of not having children. The book controversially for the time argued against marriage and instead promoted communal living, childlessness, and homosexual relationships.

== Reviews ==
Christine Williams said it was "a highly polemical book, insightful at times, and exceedingly didactic at others". W. T. Murphy commented on their positioning: "Barrett and McIntosh are sociologists and well known in the women's movement; their book is best described as aimed at a general Left-wing readership they write as socialists for socialists"; he concluded "their 'buzz-words' leave me, at any rate, little the wiser". Ann Ferguson discussed the book's use of deconstruction and argued that "it remains unclear whether the deconstruction of the family implies a specific moral/political alternative. To claim that we need to reconstruct the whole of society, rather than to advocate some specific alternative to the current capitalist-patriarchal family/household, dodges the political issue raised by the ideology of familialism". She also found the writing "boring and obscure" and that "the arguments against Lasch, Donzelot and others, though insightful, are ultimately too sketchy to be convincing".

Miriam E. David was disappointed: "It seems to me that the book, as a whole, fails in its ultimate political aim of convincing the informed reader of the correct, socialist-feminist challenge to the family form under capitalism. Nonetheless, the book is exciting, challenging and provides a number of useful critiques of aspects of family ideology." She identified the analysis of children in families as particularly weak. Philip Neiser said their "critique of the modern family is in many respects incisive". He contrasted their idea of the family being anti-social, in opposition to a vague idea of social harmony, with his proposal that family is anti-political, in opposition to community political activity. Fran Bennett commented on the heavy emphasis on textual criticism and said that "Critical Social Policy readers may wish that there was rather more contemporary political and strategic debate in the book".

The book triggered a debate about race, specifically how non-white experiences and scholarship were neglected. Hazel Carby, Floya Anthias, and Nira Yuval-Davis countered that the book was written from the viewpoint of white feminism. They believed that the family can be a focus of resistance to racism and imperialism, and that families are targeted by colonial powers. Barrett and McIntosh addressed these concerns in a 1985 essay in Feminist Review (reprinted in 2005), "the first serious white British feminist response to critiques by women of color", which "rekindled the debate on racism and the women's movement". Welcoming the debate, Kum-Kum Bhavnani and Margaret Coulson felt "it fails to open up the kind of area of discussion which is needed. This is because they lose sight of the central issue in the challenge which has been made – which is racism. By bringing another issue, namely ethnocentrism, into the foreground, they end up with their own previous conceptual categories intact." Heidi Safia Mirza's "gut reaction" was that "The paper's sole purpose seemed to be a self-indulgent exercise, exorcizing the guilt socialist-feminists feel about the myopia of their past analyses".

Hamida Kazi said the essay was "very encouraging" and commented on how Barrett and McIntosh "accept that black feminist work is ghettoized". Sue Lees said that "they do not really take an argued theoretical position. Because of this they cannot really resolve the issue of what the significance of 'race' is for feminist theory. ... They come to the main theoretical issue and then rather avoid confronting it." Caroline Ramazanoglu was scathing: "This level of tightly defended 'autocritique' seems too complacent to be appropriate in a feminist journal as a means of opening up the dialogue that they seek between the exponents of white feminism and the anger and frustration which have been widely expressed by black women."

== See also ==
- Sociology of the family
