= Blitz Kids (book) =

Book by Duncan Barrett and Nuala Calvi

- Author: Duncan Barrett, Nuala Calvi
- Language: English
- Subject: Second World War, The Blitz
- Publisher: Headline
- Publication date: 24 April 2025
- Publication place: United Kingdom
- Pages: 336 (paperback)
- ISBN: 978-0749575205

Blitz Kids: True Stories from the Children of Wartime Britain is a book by Duncan Barrett and Nuala Calvi, co-authors of The Sugar Girls. It was published in April 2025 as part of the commemorations for the eightieth anniversary of VE Day on 8 May that year.

The book tells the stories of fifteen individuals who were children during the Second World War. Researching it, the authors spoke to more than eighty so-called Blitz Kids, before choosing a representative sample of stories. These include Maureen Donovan, who was bombed out of her home in Bromley by Bow, Liverpudlians Christopher Munro, whose father was missing presumed dead in the Merchant Navy, Frances Izzard, who was evacuated to Haslington in Cheshire, and Clare McGann, mother of the actors Paul McGann, Stephen McGann, Mark McGann and Joe McGann, Irene Brown, who saw the troops departing on D-Day in Southampton, Doreen Cadden, who survived Operation Moonlight Sonata in Coventry, Doreen McBride, who helped her father smuggle meat from Dublin to Belfast, Brian Ingram, who spent his free time collecting shrapnel near his home in Birmingham, Betty Peachy, who was buried alive during a raid in Filton, on the outskirts of Bristol, and John Le Page, a Guernsey evacuee living in Halifax, West Yorkshire.

== Reception ==
The book was rated 8/10 and described as ‘poignant [and] page-turning’ by Matt Nixson in the Daily Express, and recommended as ‘inspirational’ in the Sunday Express’s ‘S’ magazine.
