= Islington Gutter Press =

Alternative newspaper published in England (1972–1985)

- Owner: Co-operatively owned
- Editor: Edited by a co-operative
- Founded: 1972
- Ceased publication: 1985
- Political alignment: Socialist
- City: London Borough of Islington
- Country: England
- Circulation: 1200

The Islington Gutter Press was an alternative or underground newspaper published in the 1970s and 1980s in Islington, an inner-city area of north London, England. One of the small, co-operatively produced local papers in England that played an important role in radical politics after 1968, it was closely associated with the area's feminist and squatter movements, and with a community print shop that was housed in the same building.

== Background ==
During the 1960s and 1970s, Islington was a centre for many radical activities. Among the organizations hosted in or nearby the London Borough of Islington were the Women's Liberation movement and London's Gay Liberation Front. The latter was housed in 5 Caledonian Road, which also gave office space to the pacifist Peace News, which owned the building, and Housmans radical bookshop. There were a large number of squatters in the area. The general left-wing approach of many in the community led to the establishment of a Squatters' Advisory Service, the Essex Road Women's Centre, one of the first women's centres in the country, communal childcare and playgroups, food cooperatives, a community printer and the Islington Gutter Press. In addition to Peace News, other publications closely associated with Islington included the national feminist magazine, Spare Rib. Also during the 1960s and 1970s, there was considerable opposition to an ongoing process of gentrification in Islington. In fact, the term was coined by Ruth Glass as a result of research in Islington and other areas of London. Such gentrification was manifested by attempts to "persuade" tenants to leave their homes so that the houses could be sold by the landlords.

== Establishment ==
The paper was established in 1972, being based at 2a St Pauls Road, London N1, which was also the premises used by the Community Press. This was a print shop that had around six workers, who were initially unpaid, which was owned by the "Islington Bus Company", a co-operative that supported community organizations in Islington, getting its name from its ownership of a London double-decker bus that was used for a children's playgroup. As well as printing the Gutter Press, the Community Press carried out numerous small print jobs for local organizations and, later, even helped out other alternative papers, such as the Brighton Voice, when they experienced printing difficulties. It was equipped with two single-colour offset printers that could also do some spot colours, and the clients were encouraged to assist with the work and learn the printing process. Broad criteria were that anything printed there had to be non-sexist, non-racist and non-commercial.

There is little information available about those who worked on the Islington Gutter Press, which was initially distributed free of charge but by 1976 was being sold for 10 pence. One who has written about her time on the paper, Lynne Segal, has said that the experience gave members of the collective an understanding of the area they lived in. It took them several years to get to grips with the local political scene, but they gradually came to understand how local government and its finances worked. Researching articles helped them to better understand the housing problems in Islington, the battles for better services, and the activities or, sometimes, inactivity of different political groups. Another contributor was Sue Lees, who was professor of women's studies at the Polytechnic of North London.

== Archives ==
The Islington Local History Centre holds an incomplete collection of copies of the Gutter Press from between 1972 and 1982.

== See also ==
- List of underground newspapers of the 1960s counterculture
