= The Sugar Girls =

Narrative non-fiction by Duncan Barrett and Nuala Calvi

- Author: Duncan Barrett and Nuala Calvi
- Language: English
- Subject: Tate & Lyle, The East End
- Published: 2012 (Collins)
- Publication place: United Kingdom
- Pages: 352 pp (paperback)
- ISBN: 978-0-00-744847-0
- Followed by: GI Brides
- Website: http://www.thesugargirls.com

The Sugar Girls: Tales of Hardship, Love and Happiness in Tate & Lyle's East End is a work of narrative non-fiction based on interviews with women from the East End who worked in Tate & Lyle's factories in Silvertown, West Ham from the mid-1940s onwards. Written by Duncan Barrett and Nuala Calvi, it was published by Collins in 2012. The authors were inspired to write it by Jennifer Worth's Call the Midwife.

== Background ==
In the East End of the 1940s and 1950s, thousands of girls left school every year at fourteen and went to work in the factories that stood alongside the docks in Silvertown, in the East End of London. The stretch of factories running between Tate & Lyle's refineries for sugar and syrup was known as the 'Sugar Mile', and also included Keiller's jam and marmalade factory. Tate & Lyle's two factories had been built in the late nineteenth century by two rival sugar refiners, Henry Tate and Abram Lyle, whose companies had merged in the 1920s.

Of all the factories in Silvertown, Tate & Lyle's offered the best wages and social life for girls leaving school. There were various jobs available to women workers at Tate & Lyle's factories, including printing and packing the bags of sugar, and making the tins of Lyle's Golden Syrup. Women who worked there showed great 'loyalty' and 'pride'. They were, however, very tribal, and depending on which factory they worked at, workers would speak of themselves as coming from 'Tates's' or 'Lyles's', competing against each other at netball, athletics, football and cricket in the company sports day, which was held once a year.

== Characters ==
Although the book is based on interviews with over fifty former workers, the four main characters featured are:

- Ethel Colquhoun (née Alleyne), a conscientious sugar-packer who worked her way up through the ranks at Tate & Lyle until she became a forelady in charge of 200 women.
- Lilian Clark (née Tull), a lovelorn can-maker who joined the factory at the age of 23, 'already scarred by terrible poverty'.
- Gladys Hudgell (née Taylor), a half-gypsy print-room girl who was always getting in trouble for 'practical jokes and general cheekiness' and who was almost sacked on a number of occasions, only keeping her job through her value to the factory athletics team.
- Joan Cook, a fun-loving sugar-packer who was forced to leave the factory under a cloud when she unexpectedly became pregnant.

As well as these four main women, the book features various other individual stories, such as:

- Barbara, a cheeky young woman who seduced her future husband over a Tate & Lyle tennis match by exaggerating her own playing abilities to become his doubles partner.
- Joan, a tea girl who punished a male manager who had groped her by running over his feet with her tea trolley.
- Edna, who staged an unofficial strike when the factory was insufficiently heated and the women were instructed to work in their hats and coats.

== Characterisation of the 'Sugar Girls' and the East End ==
Nuala Calvi, one of the co-authors of the book, characterised the female workers at Tate & Lyle – known colloquially as the 'Sugar Girls' – as 'glamorous', at least by the standards of teenagers leaving school in the East End in the 1940s and 1950s. They would take in their dungarees, making them figure-hugging, and stuff their turbans with underwear to make them sit high up on their heads, which was considered fashionable. But she also claimed that the women shared a common confident 'attitude' and were 'no pushovers', likening them to the striking workers at Ford's Dagenham plant featured in the popular movie Made in Dagenham.

In the same article, Calvi also commented on the discrepancy between the way the East End of London is often represented – 'linked in the popular imagination with gangsters, criminals and prostitutes (or the grim squalor of Call the Midwife)' – and the reality of life for the families of the women she interviewed – 'honest, hard-working families' who 'brought up their children to contribute to the family income'. In a separate article, her co-author Duncan Barrett made a similar point: 'The women we spoke to recalled the great pride their mothers would take in keeping their houses spotless and how, despite a lack of money, families would always make do, helping out the neighbours when they could, knowing that the favour would always be returned. When we handed in the manuscript of the book, our publishers were a little surprised, perhaps expecting the predictable Dickensian East End of much misery-memoir writing. 'This is a lot jollier than we expected,' they told us.'

== Reception ==
In a quotation featured on the cover of the paperback, Melanie McGrath, author of the books Silvertown and Hopping, described the book as 'An authoritative and highly readable work of social history which brings vividly to life a fascinating part of East End life before it is lost forever.'

On 8 April 2012, The Sugar Girls debuted at No. 10 in the Sunday Times Bestseller List, spending five weeks in the top ten. In the paper's end-of-year round-up it ranked second for bestsellers in History, having sold 37,760 copies.

In 2024, Barrett and Calvi released a sequel, The Sugar Girls of Love Lane, this time focussing on the women who worked at Tate & Lyle’s Liverpool factory, from the 1960s until its closure in 1981.
