= Sue Lees =

English academic, activist, feminist and writer

- Born: 16 June 1941; India
- Died: 17 September 2002 (aged 61); United Kingdom
- Citizenship: United Kingdom
- Education: Queen's College, London
- Alma mater: University of Edinburgh; Birkbeck College; London School of Economics
- Occupations: Academic; Activist; Feminist; Writer
- Years active: 1960s–2002
- Children: 2

Sue Lees (16 June 1941 – 17 September 2002) was an English academic, activist, feminist and writer. She was a lecturer on social work at the Middlesex Polytechnic and the University of York in the 1960s before working as professor of women's studies at the Polytechnic of North London (now the London Metropolitan University) from 1976 to 1993. Lees helped co-establish the Women's Studies Network (UK) Association and the first undergraduate Bachelor of Arts degree course in women's studies in the United Kingdom. She was Polytechnic of North London's centre for research in ethnicity and gender between 1993 and 1997. Lees authored five books between 1986 and 1997 and influenced the 1997 New Labour government to change how women were treated at rape trials. She consulted the Channel 4 television series Dispatches on programmes on rape.

== Early life ==
On 16 June 1941, Lees was born into a middle-class family in India. She was the youngest daughter of an executive of the Shell Oil Company. When Lees was six years old, she was sent to a boarding school in England to keep her away from the Indian independence movement. After her family was reunited, she attended Queen's College, London. Lees went on to matriculate to University of Edinburgh studying for a social policy diploma, earning the Radzinowicz Prize in Criminology. She then studied for a social studies degree at Birkbeck College and subsequently a social studies degree at the London School of Economics.

== Career ==
Lees worked as a probation officer and a child care officer, before being appointed lecturer on social work at the Middlesex Polytechnic and the University of York in the 1960s; she was dismayed at how her male colleagues behaved. In 1976, Lees joined the Polytechnic of North London (now the London Metropolitan University) as professor of women's studies. She began in the Department of Applied Studies and helped operate the applied studies course, supporting low-achieving students by holding meetings telling them it was a negative on radical education and not their own ability and potential. Lees was supported by the Council for National Academic Awards and the examiners.

She assisted in the setting up of the Women's Studies Network (UK) Association, serving as joint-chair, and co-established the first undergraduate Bachelor of Arts degree course in women's studies in the United Kingdom. Lees got influenced by the early women's liberation movement and was a co-opt member of the Women's Committee on Islington London Borough Council for four years and contributed to the radical-left wing community paper Islington Gutter Press. When Equal Opportunities officers were appointed to the Polytechnic of North London, she protected the subject as well as women's studies.

In 1986, she published her first book, Losing Out: Slags or Drags?. Lees focused on young women and education in the book using analysis. Her second book, a study called Sugar And Spice, Sexuality And Adolescent Girls, followed in 1993. Lees reviewed how boys and girls relate to each other and how boys' reputation is improved by insinuating about sexual morality and how the same thing destroys girls' reputations through mistreatment by their peers and higher authority.

She was appointed director of Polytechnic of North London's centre for research in ethnicity and gender between 1993 and 1997. Lees' third book, Carnal Knowledge: Rape on Trial, followed in 1996. She analysed the reporting of rape in the media and dealt with in the English legal system using three research studies' findings. Lees said the legal system systemically enabled rapists to escape punishment and the judiciary and press frequently stereotyped women as sexually provocative. With this work, she helped influence multiple members of the 1997 New Labour governments to change how women were treated at rape trials, by limiting the evidence on a women's sexual history; she was limited to conducting the work for half a decade as a result of stress.

Lees contributed the chapter Unreasonable Doubt: the Outcomes of Rape Trials to the 1996 book Women, Violence and Male Power, building on three feminist research studies conducted in the 1980s and early 1990s into criminal justice, legal response to rape and the police. She stated her research into rape and sexual violence began by accident after observing murder trials at the Old Bailey and wrote about the problems women face reporting rape during the trial process. Lees revisited this theme in her final book, Ruling Passions: Policing Sexual Assault, published in 1997. She consulted the Channel 4 television series Dispatches for several episodes on rape, one of which about serial rapists called Getting Away with Rape in 1993 won a Royal Television Award. Lees made an appearance on Channel 4's The 11 O'Clock Show in 1999, featuring Ali G asking her about feminism. Lees' appearance on the programme made a younger audience more aware of her.

== Personal life ==
She was married three times and had two children of the second marriage. Lees was diagnosed with ovarian cancer in February 2001 and began working at home after taking some time off. On 17 September 2002, she died of the ovarian cancer she was diagnosed with.

== Legacy ==
Melissa Benn of The Guardian wrote of Lees' legacy: "Her feminism was always rooted in common sense. She would frequently express fury at the behaviour of this defence lawyer, or that judge, but she was never stuffy or pious with it; there was often an undercurrent of laughing disbelief to her anger." Miriam. E. David in the journal Gender and Education calls Lees: "a wonderful flowing writer and superb communicator of ideas to both popular and academic audiences." Jill Radford and Nicole Westmarland in the book Researching Gender Violence said: "Sue Lees had, and indeed continues to have, an amazing influence on students and academics and has been at the forefront, paving the way forward for research on rape and the criminal justice system. Her writing has inspired and influenced a number of projects, from undergraduate projects to PhD theses, and her work will undoubtedly continue to be cited for a great many decades to come."

== Popular culture ==
Lees appeared on an episode of Da Ali G Show, where Sacha Baron Cohen interviews Sue as a fictional character called Ali G.
