= Elizabeth Meese =

American academic

Elizabeth Meese was an American academic who specialized in feminist theory. She was a professor at the University of Alabama, in the English Department, which named an award for her, the "Elizabeth Meese Memorial Award in Feminist Theory".

With her partner, creative writing professor Sandy Huss, she has published essays that combine theoretical writing with fiction, as in the collection Lesbian Erotics. An essay of hers in an anthology edited by Karla Jay and Joanne Glasgow, Lesbian Texts and Contexts, was praised by one reviewer for "suggestively wander[ing] through problems of meaning and representation, ruminating on the connections among desire, lesbian identity, and writing".

== Bibliography ==
=== Edited collection ===
- The Difference Within: Feminism and Critical Theory (with Alice Parker; John Benjamins, 1989)

=== Monographs ===
- (Ex)tensions: Re-Figuring Feminist Criticism (University of Illinois Press, 1990)
