= GI Brides =

2013 book by Duncan Barrett and Nuala Calvi

- Author: Duncan Barrett and Nuala Calvi
- Original title: GI Brides: The Wartime Girls Who Crossed the Atlantic for Love
- Language: English
- Subject: Second World War, war brides
- Publisher: HarperCollins
- Publication date: 29 August 2013
- Publication place: United Kingdom
- Pages: 368 (paperback)
- ISBN: 978-0007501441
- Preceded by: The Sugar Girls

GI Brides: The Wartime Girls Who Crossed the Atlantic for Love is a bestselling book by Duncan Barrett and Nuala Calvi, authors of The Sugar Girls. It was published by HarperCollins on 29 August 2013.

The book tells the true stories of four British GI Brides, women who married American servicemen stationed in their country during the 'friendly invasion' of the Second World War. It is based on interviews with them, but written in a narrative style.

== Characters ==
Sylvia O'Connor – a volunteer at a Red Cross club in London who married a military policeman from Baltimore. She travelled to America by plane after he won the money for the ticket in a dice game.

Lyn Patrino – who married an Italian-American lieutenant she met in her hometown of Southampton. After a stay at a transit camp in Tidworth, she traveled on one of the early war bride ships, and arrived in New York to find protesters waving placards that read 'English Whores Go Home'.

Rae Zurovcik – a welder in the ATS who met her husband while stationed in Mansfield. While on the ship to New York, she was already doubting her decision to marry an American and wished that she could swim back to England.

Margaret Denby – Calvi's grandmother and the inspiration for the book, who married a man from a land-owning family in Georgia. She had begun seeing him while on the rebound from another American.

== Background ==
The authors researched the book during a three-month visit to America in 2012. They drove through 38 states and covered almost 13,000 miles (21,000 km) in their search for surviving war brides, and interviewed more than 60 brides and their relatives.

== Reception ==
On 15 September 2013 the book went into the Sunday Times bestsellers chart at number eight. On 30 November 2014 a US edition went into the New York Times nonfiction bestseller list.
