= San Ramón de la Nueva Orán =

- City
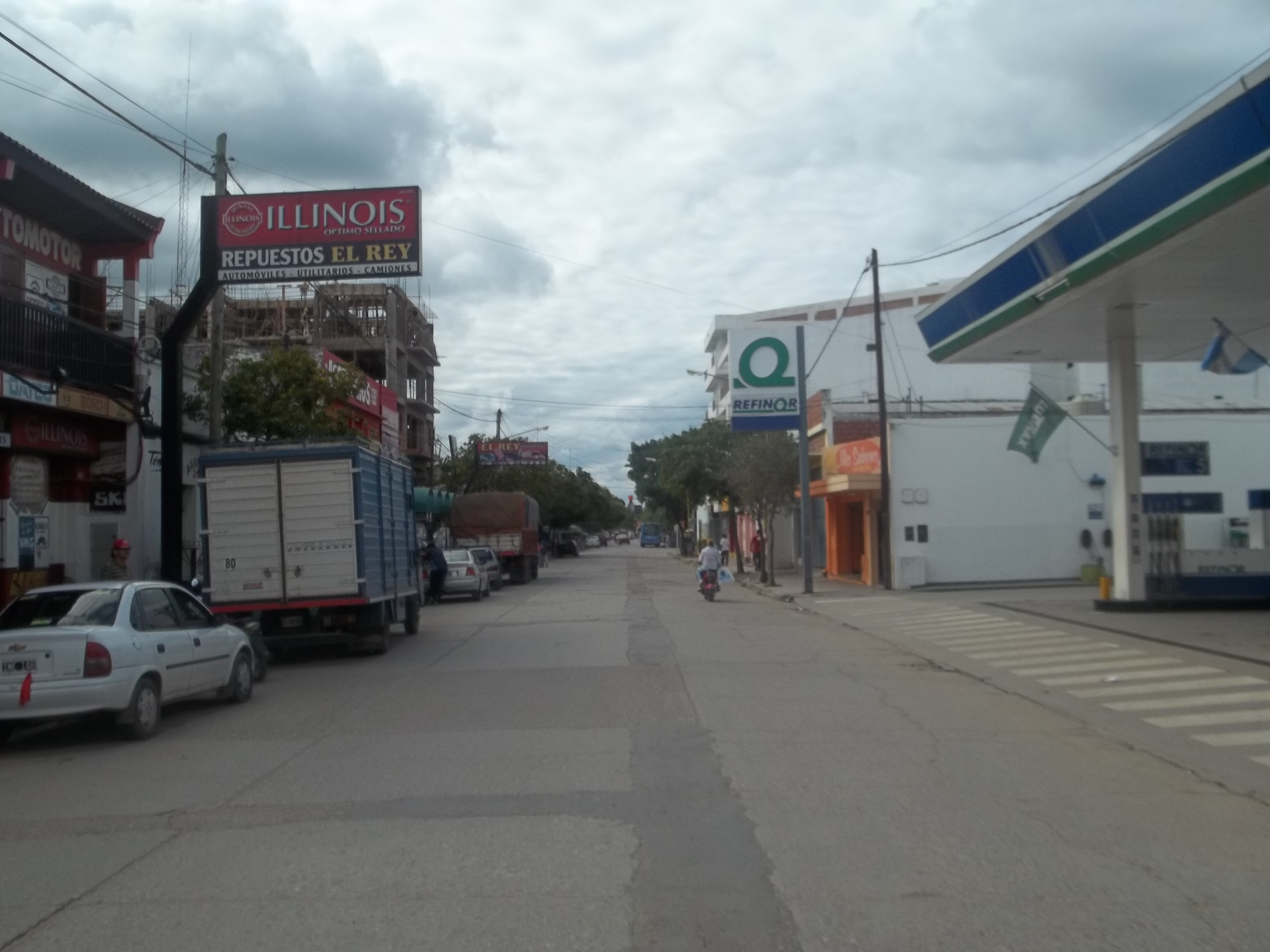

- Location of Orán in Argentina
- Coordinates: 23°08′S 64°20′W
- Country: Argentina
- Province: Salta
- Department: Orán Department
- Founded: August 31, 1794

Government
  - Mayor: Guillermo Marcelo Lara Gros (Justicialist Party)
- Elevation: 336 m (1,102 ft)

Population (2010 census)
  - Total: 76,070
- Demonym: oranese
- Time zone: UTC−3 (ART)
- CPA base: A4530
- Dialing code: +54 3878
- Climate: Cwa
- Website: Official website

San Ramón de la Nueva Orán (usually referred to simply as Orán) is a city in northwest province of Salta, Argentina, about 270 km (170 mi) from the provincial capital, Salta. It is the head town of the Orán Department, and it has about 73,000 inhabitants as per the 2001 census [INDEC], which makes it the second-most populated in the province.

Orán is the seat of a Catholic diocese and a regional center of the Universidad Nacional de Salta. It is linked to other cities in the area by National Route 50 near National Route 34. Air traffic to the provincial capital is serviced by the Orán Airport (IATA: ORA, ICAO: SASO).

The city of Oran is the most important geopolitical center in the north of the province of Salta. Having AFIP, ANES, Banco Nación, INTA, and a Federal Court, among other important offices, makes the city a point of reference to the entire Bermejo Region. It has active commercial centers, and methods of transit to the Bolivian border. Currently there is construction of a freeway from the south of the town connecting it to the city of Pichanal.

== History ==
The city was founded on August 31, 1794, by the Spanish military man and governor of Salta, Ramón García de León y Pizarro, who named the settlement after Saint Raymond Nonnatus (on the saint's feast day) and his own birthplace, the city of Oran (in modern Algeria).

== Economy ==
Oran is center to an important agroindustry region where several different products are produced: Sugar cane, with most product going to sugar production in the Tabacal Sugarmill, which is located close to the city; Citrus (mainly oranges and grapefruit), being primarily used for the manufacture of concentrated juice for the fruit company, Zenta, which also sells whole, natural fruits. These include peppers, bananas, cherimoya, papayas and mangoes- all of which are also cultivated in Oran. Coffee was also produced in the area, although with relatively small production.

Soy is one of the most important produced agricultural products. The department of Oran has the largest bean production in the country. They have recently incorporated soy production, along with their ongoing production of sugar cane and corn, to produce biofuels, mainly for agro-industrial use, due in large part to the deficiency in the supply of gasoil in the zone.

Naturally surrounded by ecotonic forests: between the Yungas jungles and the Chaco tropical forests, the environment of Oran has been and is an important forest area to the timber industry.

Livestock also plays an important role in the economy. Historically the city of Oran has been a stopover on a cattle and horse route to Bolivia.

== Climate ==
Orán has a humid subtropical climate with definite dry season (Köppen: Cwa). In the regional classification is defined as "tropical serrano" from the west–east transition of the Andes to the northern plains of the country. With hot, rainy summers and mild, dry winters.

Climate data for Orán, Salta, Argentina (1991–2020, extremes 1961–present)
Month	Jan	Feb	Mar	Apr	May	Jun	Jul	Aug	Sep	Oct	Nov	Dec	Year
Record high °C (°F)	43.5 (110.3)	42.1 (107.8)	40.0 (104.0)	35.8 (96.4)	34.5 (94.1)	31.5 (88.7)	35.4 (95.7)	39.4 (102.9)	42.3 (108.1)	44.5 (112.1)	44.0 (111.2)	45.0 (113.0)	45.0 (113.0)
Mean daily maximum °C (°F)	32.8 (91.0)	31.4 (88.5)	29.4 (84.9)	26.5 (79.7)	23.4 (74.1)	21.6 (70.9)	22.4 (72.3)	26.2 (79.2)	29.4 (84.9)	31.8 (89.2)	32.4 (90.3)	33.2 (91.8)	28.4 (83.1)
Daily mean °C (°F)	26.4 (79.5)	25.4 (77.7)	23.9 (75.0)	21.3 (70.3)	18.1 (64.6)	15.6 (60.1)	14.9 (58.8)	17.6 (63.7)	21.0 (69.8)	24.5 (76.1)	25.5 (77.9)	26.4 (79.5)	21.7 (71.1)
Mean daily minimum °C (°F)	21.6 (70.9)	21.2 (70.2)	20.3 (68.5)	17.9 (64.2)	14.5 (58.1)	11.3 (52.3)	9.6 (49.3)	11.1 (52.0)	14.2 (57.6)	18.4 (65.1)	19.7 (67.5)	21.2 (70.2)	16.7 (62.1)
Record low °C (°F)	12.7 (54.9)	11.2 (52.2)	10.8 (51.4)	5.1 (41.2)	0.4 (32.7)	−1.5 (29.3)	−3.6 (25.5)	−3.4 (25.9)	−0.5 (31.1)	4.0 (39.2)	8.5 (47.3)	11.5 (52.7)	−3.6 (25.5)
Average precipitation mm (inches)	198.4 (7.81)	185.9 (7.32)	157.8 (6.21)	59.5 (2.34)	22.6 (0.89)	7.1 (0.28)	3.0 (0.12)	3.5 (0.14)	16.3 (0.64)	58.9 (2.32)	97.3 (3.83)	157.3 (6.19)	967.6 (38.09)
Average precipitation days (≥ 0.1 mm)	13.5	12.5	14.3	11.3	7.1	3.7	2.3	1.5	2.8	7.6	9.7	12.1	98.3
Average relative humidity (%)	76.5	79.3	82.8	84.3	83.6	81.0	73.8	63.3	55.7	61.1	66.7	71.5	69.0
Mean monthly sunshine hours	207.7	163.9	133.3	114.0	114.7	117.0	161.2	182.9	165.0	164.3	183.0	198.4	1,905.4
Mean daily sunshine hours	6.7	5.8	4.3	3.8	3.7	3.9	5.2	5.9	5.5	5.3	6.1	6.4	5.2
Percentage possible sunshine	48	43	31	30	34	31	42	51	35	41	46	48	40
Source 1: Servicio Meteorológico Nacional
Source 2: UNLP (percent sun only 1971–1980)

== Notable people ==
- Marcelo Mendieta (born 1937), Argentine journalist
- Nicolás Vuyovich (1981–2005), Argentine racing driver
