= The Reluctant Tommy =

Book by Ronald Skirth

- First edition cover
- Author: Ronald Skirth; Editor:Duncan Barrett
- Language: English
- Genre: Non-Fiction
- Publisher: Macmillan Publishers
- Publication date: 2010
- Publication place: United Kingdom
- Media type: Print (Hardcover)
- Pages: 354
- ISBN: 9780230746732

The Reluctant Tommy is a book compiled by Duncan Barrett from the memoirs of Ronald Skirth, a member of the Royal Garrison Artillery during the First World War. His experiences during the Battle of Messines, the Battle of Passchendaele and the Second Battle of the Piave River, which Skirth calls the Battle of the Asiago Plateau, were detailed in this book. The book captured attention due to Skirth's actions during the war to avoid enemy casualties. The manuscript was known only by the family for decades before finally being published in 2010. The book received favourable reviews on publication, but was also criticised for significant historical inaccuracies.

== History ==
After coming home from the war Ronald Skirth entered the teaching profession. When already retired in 1971 he started work writing about his wartime memories of the First World War, and in particular his experience of disillusionment. Although he initially intended to focus on his relationship with his wife Ella, touching on the war only briefly, he soon felt under a "compulsion" to write more about his war experiences. He worked on the memoir for over a year, eventually filling five green ring binders with many hundreds of pages, and over the next few years, despite suffering two strokes, he repeatedly went back to the material, editing, amending and adding to what he had written.

== Publication ==
In 2010 the memoir was published in book form by Macmillan, as The Reluctant Tommy: Ronald Skirth's Extraordinary Memoir of the First World War, edited by Duncan Barrett. Barrett wrote in an introduction that he felt that Skirth's story "deserved as wide an audience as possible—and to be read in its protagonist's own words". Skirth's daughter Jean, who had given permission for the memoir to be published remained uncertain whether publishing the memoir was what her father would have wanted, but believed that it was important that his story was widely known. The book carried a foreword by Channel 4 News anchor Jon Snow, in which he wrote about his grandfather Lieutenant-General Sir Thomas D'Oyly Snow. Referring to the popular description of the lower ranks as "lions led by donkeys", Snow acknowledged that "If Ronald Skirth was a 'lion', Thom Snow was ultimately a 'donkey'."

== Critical reaction ==
The Reluctant Tommy received largely favourable reviews – for example by Richard Holmes in the Evening Standard and Jonathan Gibbs in the Financial Times – as well as coverage in Socialist Worker and, in an article written by the book's editor, the Sunday Express.

[An] important contribution to the literature of the war ... a remorseless condemnation of war and support for the stance of the absolute pacifist ... I would certainly buy this book even if I had not been sent a review copy, and whenever I get too misty-eyed about officer-man relationships I shall reread it to remind me of how badly things could go wrong. And of just how vital it is, for any democratic society seeking to use war as an instrument of policy, to ensure that the connection between war's means and its political ends is crystal clear.

— Richard Holmes, Evening Standard

Skirth’s writing may be uneven but it carries the unmistakable tenor of honesty and true belief, not least in his disgust at the behaviour of many of his superiors. His descriptions of seeing his friends gassed and blown to bits are moving as much for what he can’t bring himself to write, as for what he can. The book began as the story of his marriage to the girl who waited for him back home, and that sense of a happy ending shines through even the bleakest moments.

— Jonathan Gibbs, Financial Times

Not all criticism has been favourable. A review in the BBC's Who Do You Think You Are magazine remarks on the disparities between official war records and Skirth's version of events:

He movingly describes two friends and an officer being killed on Messines Ridge on 8th June 1917—but the unit war diary notes no casualties and the named officer isn't on the Commonwealth War Graves Register. In November 1917 he says his battery was so far forward that they were ordered to withdraw and his insane CO refused to leave—Skirth claims to have disobeyed his direct order and fled with his pal Jock Shiels—yet according to the CWG Register, John Shiels of 293 Battery RGA was killed on 18th July 1917. When the battery is later sent to Italy, Skirth is quite clear that it was without guns as late on as April 1918. The war diary, on the other hand, records them firing bombardments on numerous occasions. The overall impression he gives of the tiny scale of one man caught up in a huge and apparently indifferent military machine in a war like none previous is impressive – but should be treated with great caution as factual history.

In response to general criticism received after initial publication that Skirth was a liar or a fantasist, Barrett revised his introduction to the paperback edition, published in 2011. He recognised that there were discrepancies between Skirth's account and historical sources which made his book an unreliable history, but still considered the book a valuable memoir of one man's personal experiences.

In 2011, The Sunday Times reported that Skirth had been "...exposed for character assassination..." and that the Imperial War Museum, which had held Skirth's memoirs since 1999, "...has admitted they are mostly fictional". The report was based on research begun by Ruth Ward as part of a campaign to clear the name of her grandfather, Bernard Bromley, who had served with Skirth and whose character Skirth had besmirched. Ward's research, which was lodged with the Imperial War Museum when it was completed in 2014, identified significant discrepancies in Skirth's account. It revealed differences in the biographical information of characters and in events described by Skirth when compared to official historical sources. Ward concludes that "Skirth's war memoir was not a genuine account, or a semi-fictional one, but a satire" which "unfairly represented genuine figures" to "subtly and implicitly" ridicule the shortcomings of the British Army.
