= Jennifer Worth =

British nurse, midwife, author and musician (1935–2011)

Jennifer Worth RN RM
- Worth as a nurse in the 1950s
- Born: Jennifer Samantha Louise Lee; 25 September 1935; Clacton-on-Sea, Essex, England
- Died: 31 May 2011 (aged 75); Hemel Hempstead, England
- Occupations: Nurse, musician, author
- Spouse: Philip Worth (m. 1963)
- Children: 2

Jennifer Louise Worth (née Lee; 25 September 1935 – 31 May 2011) was a British memoirist, nurse, and midwife. She worked in the poverty-stricken East End of London in the 1950s, where she gained much of her experience that would later shape her writing. Drawing on these experiences, she wrote a best-selling trilogy: Call the Midwife (2002), Shadows of the Workhouse (2005) and Farewell to The East End (2009). After leaving her career in nursing, Worth re-trained as a musician.

A television series, Call the Midwife, based on her books, began broadcasting on BBC One in the UK on 15 January 2012 and on PBS in the US on 30 September 2012.

== Biography ==
Jennifer "Jenny" Louise Lee was born in Clacton-on-Sea, Essex, on 25 September 1935, to Gordon and Elsie (née Gibbs) Lee. Worth was raised in Amersham, Buckinghamshire. She had a younger sister, Christine, and two younger paternal half-sisters. Worth was educated at the independent Bournemouth School for girls. After leaving school at the age of 15 she learned shorthand and typing and became the secretary to the head of Dr Challoner's Grammar School. She then trained as a nurse at the Royal Berkshire Hospital, in Reading, and moved to London to receive training to become a midwife.

Lee was hired as a staff nurse at the London Hospital in Whitechapel in the 1950s. With the Sisters of St John the Divine, an Anglican community of nuns, she worked to aid the poor. She was then a ward sister at the Elizabeth Garrett Anderson Hospital in Bloomsbury. She left midwifery to work in palliative care at the Marie Curie Hospice in Hampstead.

She married the artist Philip Worth in 1963, and they had two daughters. Worth left nursing in 1973 to pursue her musical interests. In 1974, she was appointed a licentiate of the London College of Music, where she taught piano and singing. She obtained a fellowship in 1984. She performed as a soloist and with choirs throughout the UK and Europe.

Many years later she began writing, and her first volume of memoirs, Call the Midwife, was published in 2002. The book became a best-seller when it was reissued in 2007. In 2007 Worth was honoured with the Royal Red Cross for her services in healthcare. In October 2009, she received the Mothers Naturally Award for Outstanding book for her memoir. Shadows of the Workhouse (2005; reissued 2008) and Farewell to the East End (2009) also became best-sellers. The trilogy sold almost a million copies in the UK alone. In a fourth volume of memoirs, In the Midst of Life, published in 2010, Worth reflects on her later experiences caring for the terminally ill.

== Activism ==
Worth was highly critical of Mike Leigh's 2004 film Vera Drake, for depicting the consequences of illegal abortions unrealistically. She argued that the method shown in the film, far from being fairly quick and painless, was in fact almost invariably fatal for the woman. As a result of the harm done with such illegal procedures, she approved of the legalization of abortion in the UK, saying this was a medical, not moral, issue.

== Death ==
Worth died on 31 May 2011, having been diagnosed with cancer of the oesophagus earlier in the year. In accordance with her wishes, her ashes were scattered at sea. A deeply religious woman, she maintained a strong commitment to God throughout her life.

The first episode of the television series Call the Midwife, based on Worth's experiences in Poplar, London, in the late 1950s, is dedicated to her memory. She had been in contact with the show writers and actors prior to her death. In the series a fictionalized version of Worth is played by Jessica Raine during the first three seasons; with Vanessa Redgrave providing the voice of the older Worth through narration.

Worth’s memoirs, along with their BBC adaptation, have had a lasting impact on public awareness of midwifery. Following the show's premiere, some programmes in the UK reported increased enrolment in midwifery training.

== Publications ==
- Worth, Jennifer (2007). Eczema and Food Allergy: The Hidden Cause? : My Story. Merton Books. ISBN 978-1872560182.
- Call the Midwife (First book in the Midwife trilogy) Worth, Jennifer (September 2012). Call the Midwife: A True Story of the East End in the 1950s. Orion Publishing Group, Limited. ISBN 978-0297868781. (2002)
- Shadows of the Workhouse (Second book in the Midwife trilogy) Worth, Jennifer (2008). Shadows of the Workhouse. Weidenfeld & Nicolson. ISBN 978-0297853268. (2005)
- Worth, Jennifer (2009). Farewell to the East End. Phoenix. ISBN 978-0753823064. (Third book in the Midwife trilogy)
- Worth, Jennifer (2010). In the Midst of Life. Weidenfeld & Nicolson. ISBN 978-0297859581.
