= Mary Susan McIntosh =

British sociologist and activist (1936–2013)

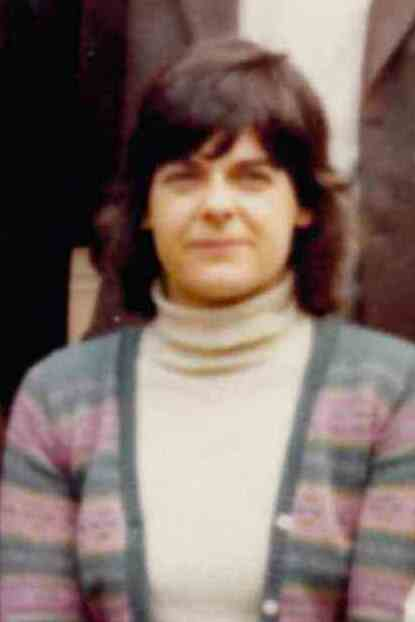
- McIntosh at Nuffield College in 1974
- Born: 13 March 1936; Hampstead, North London, England
- Died: 5 January 2013 (aged 76); Queen Square, London, England

Academic background
- Education: St Anne's College, Oxford; University of California, Berkeley
- Thesis: Marxist and Feminist Analysis of the Family (1991)

Academic work
- Discipline: Sociology
- Institutions: University of Leicester; Borough Polytechnic; University of Essex

Mary Susan McIntosh (13 March 1936 – 5 January 2013) was a British sociologist, feminist, and political activist for LGBTQ rights in the United Kingdom.

== Early life and education ==
Mary Susan McIntosh was born on 13 March 1936 in Hampstead, North London, to Helena Agnes (Jenny) Britton and her Albert William McIntosh, a Jedburgh-born businessman and professor at the London Business School. Both of her parents were socialists, members of the 1917 Club and later the Communist Party. Her elder brother, Andrew Robert McIntosh, was a Labour politician and minister who was created a life peer, Lord McIntosh of Haringey, in 1982.

McIntosh was educated at High Wycombe School for Girls and St Anne's College, Oxford, where she read Philosophy, Politics and Economics. After graduating in 1958, she moved to the United States, where she was a graduate student in the sociology department at the University of California, Berkeley. In 1960, she was deported from the United States for speaking out against the House Un-American Activities Committee.

== Academic career ==
On her return to the UK, McIntosh worked as a researcher for the Home Office from 1961 to 1963 before taking up the post of lecturer in sociology at the University of Leicester from 1963 to 1968. She later worked at Borough Polytechnic from 1968 to 1972, and as a research fellow studying prostitution at Nuffield College, Oxford, from 1972 to 1975. She joined the University of Essex in 1975 as a lecturer in the department of sociology. She later became the first female head of the department, and remained at the university until she retired in 1996. Throughout her career she taught a wide range of courses covering criminology, sociology, social policy, family studies, gender studies, feminism, and Marxism.

== Criminology research ==
McIntosh's earliest research was in the field of criminology and the sociology of homosexuality. In 1968 she published the paper "The Homosexual Role" in the journal Social Problems. Based on a survey of gay men in Leicester and London, this paper argues that rather than being a psychiatric or clinical pathology, homosexuality and same-sex relationships are influenced by historical and cultural factors, and that "homosexual" is a social category coercively imposed on some individuals for the purpose of social control. This paper has been described as being crucial in the shaping of social constructionism.

McIntosh was critical of the orthodox view of criminology and in 1967 became one of the co-founders of the National Deviancy Symposium following the Third National Conference of Teaching and Research on Criminology at the University of Cambridge. Influenced by sociological approaches and American symbolic interactionism, the symposium aimed to challenge dominant orthodoxies of crime and deviance and to instigate radical and critical approaches to criminology.

Although McIntosh moved away from the field of academic criminology in the mid-1970s, she was a member of the Policy Advisory Committee to the Criminal Law Revision Committee from 1976 to 1985, which reviewed legislation relating to sexual offences. Through this committee, she was involved in efforts to lower the age of male homosexual consent from 21 to 18.

== Gay and women's rights ==
In 1970, McIntosh and her partner Elizabeth Wilson were among a small group of lesbians who contributed to founding and shaping the direction of the London Gay Liberation Front at the London School of Economics. McIntosh was influential within the Gay Liberation Front and was part of the small group that authored the Gay Liberation Front Manifesto in 1971.

Along with a group of feminist colleagues, McIntosh founded the journal Feminist Review in 1979, and remained an active member of the journal collective until the early 1990s. McIntosh was committed to campaigning for the legal and financial rights of married and co-habiting women, a cause she pursued with the Fifth Demand Group. McIntosh was also an active member of Feminists Against Censorship, a group of sex-positive feminists founded in 1989, who argued against censorship of pornography and defended sexual expression and the right to produce sexually explicit material. McIntosh argued against radical separatist feminist critiques of pornography. Throughout her life McIntosh continued to forge links between the gay liberation movement, the women's movement and lesbian movements.

== Politics ==
McIntosh espoused Marxist feminism and was a member of the Communist Party from 1974.

== Retirement ==
Following her retirement from the University of Essex in 1996, McIntosh worked with the Citizens Advice Bureau in Islington, North London. She entered a civil partnership with Angela Stewart-Park in 2005.

After suffering a first stroke in 2010, she died at the National Hospital for Neurology and Neurosurgery in London on 5 January 2013 after suffering a second stroke. Her remains were cremated at Marylebone Cemetery on 18 January 2013.

Her archives, composed of correspondence, research notes, campaigning materials, journals, and ephemera, is held by the London School of Economics Library.

== Selected publications ==
- The Organisation of Crime (1975)
- Deviance and Social Control (1974), co-authored with Paul Rock.
- Sex Exposed: Sexuality and the Pornography Debate (1992), co-authored with Lynne Segal.
- The Antisocial Family (1982), co-authored with Michèle Barrett.
- "Dependency Culture? Women, Welfare and Work", in Radical Philosophy 91 (1998)
