= Verso Books =

British publishing house

- Parent company: New Left Review
- Founded: 1970; 56 years ago (as New Left Books)
- Headquarters location: 6 Meard Street, London W1F OEG; 388 Atlantic Ave, Brooklyn, New York, United States 11217
- Distribution: Penguin Random House (U.S.); Macmillan Distribution (UK); Bloomsbury Publishing (Australia)
- Publication types: Books
- Official website: www.versobooks.com

Verso Books (formerly New Left Books) is a publishing house based in London and New York City. Founded in 1970 by the staff of the New Left Review, it has Tariq Ali and Perry Anderson on its board of directors. According to its website, it is the largest independent, radical publishing house in the English-speaking world, publishing one hundred books a year. Harper's described it as "Anglo-America's preeminent radical press," and The Sunday Times called it "a rigorously intelligent publisher."

== Operations ==
In 1970, Verso Books began as a paperback imprint of New Left Books and became its sole imprint. It established itself as a publisher of nonfiction works on international politics. Verso Books has also periodically published fiction over its history.

On 8 April 2014 Verso began bundling DRM-free ebooks with print purchases made through its website. Verso's managing director and US publisher, Jacob Stevens, stated that he expected the new offer on the Verso website to contribute £200,000 to the publisher's revenue in its first year helping to "shake up how publishers relate to their readership, and help to support independent publishing".

In 2019, Verso Books launched a dedicated fiction imprint, Verso Fiction. The fiction editor, Cian McCourt, said, "We want to publish bold, intelligent writing that's politically astute, but not dogmatic or charmless." In an article titled "The best (and worst) fiction books of 2023", The Telegraph said of the imprint, "But the gem has been Verso, our closest thing to a mainstream radical publisher. It’s building one of Britain’s most interesting fiction lists."

Verso Books titles are distributed in the United States by Penguin Random House.

The publishing house hosts many events in the United States and the UK, focusing on radical politics and history.

As of 2020, it had two offices (one in the United States and one in the United Kingdom) with a total of 29 employees.

=== Sexual harassment grievance ===
In 2021, Verso was publicly accused of poorly handling an internal sexual harassment grievance brought by a former publicist employed in the company's US office against its long-time publisher, Jacob Stevens. She described the incident in a Medium piece thus: "He then said, of my hiring, 'We needed someone nice to look at in the office besides Wes.'” She claims that this remark caused severe depression and self-harm. The board of directors responded with a public apology and updates on their sexual harassment policy. However, they likewise maintain that their procedures were properly followed, as determined by an independent review.

=== Marston Book Services bankruptcy ===
In September 2024, Verso launched a crowdfunding campaign via the website Kickstarter, in response to the bankruptcy of its UK distributor, Marston Book Services. UK-based United Independent Distributors, of which Marston was a subsidiary, had entered administration on 25 July 2024.

Verso expected that the revenue crowdfunding campaign would allow it to publish its planned Autumn 2024 catalogue and pay for expenses as it transitioned to a new distribution arrangement with Macmillan Distribution.

== Publications ==
The publisher gained early recognition for translations of books by European thinkers and Continental philosophy, especially those from the Frankfurt School, and its affiliation with Marxist and neo-Marxist writers. Verso Books' best-selling title is the autobiography of Rigoberta Menchú, who was awarded the Nobel Peace Prize in 1992.

Verso has published books by Tariq Ali, Benedict Anderson, Robin Blackburn, Judith Butler, Noam Chomsky, C.L.R James, Mike Davis, Norman Finkelstein, Fredric Jameson, John Roberts, Edward Said, Max Shachtman, Rebecca Solnit, David Harvey, Nick Srnicek, Paul Feyerabend, Ellen Meiksins Wood, and Slavoj Žižek. Updated translations of Jean Baudrillard, Régis Debray, Jürgen Habermas, Rigoberta Menchú, and Paul Virilio have also been published through Verso.

By 2020, Verso Books had published over 1,800 titles.

== See also ==
- List of Radical Thinkers releases
- New Left Review
