= Blowback (intelligence) =

Unintended consequence of covert operations

Blowback is the unintended consequences and unwanted side-effects of a covert operation. To the civilians suffering the blowback of covert operations, the effect typically manifests itself as "random" acts of political violence without a discernible, direct cause; because the public—in whose name the intelligence agency acted—are unaware of the secret attacks that provoked revenge (counter-attack) against them.

== Etymology ==
Originally, blowback was CIA internal coinage denoting the unintended, harmful consequences—to friendly populations and military forces—when a given weapon is used beyond its purpose as intended by the party supplying it. Examples include anti-Western religious figures (e.g. Osama bin Laden) who, in due course, attack foe and sponsor; right-wing counter-revolutionaries who sell drugs to their sponsor's civil populace (see CIA and Contras cocaine trafficking in the US); and banana republic juntas (see Salvadoran Civil War) who kill American reporters or nuns (e.g. Dorothy Kazel).

In formal print usage, the term blowback first appeared in the Clandestine Service History—Overthrow of Premier Mossadeq of Iran—November 1952–August 1953, the CIA's internal history of the 1953 Iranian coup d'état, sponsored by the American and British governments, which was published in March 1954. Blowback from this operation would indeed occur with the Iranian Revolution and the Iran hostage crisis. Recent accounts of how blowback functioned in the war on terror relation to US and UK intelligence and defense propaganda and became an important issue in a 21st Century media environment are discussed by Emma Briant in her book Propaganda and Counter-terrorism which presents first-hand accounts and discussions of deliberate and unintended consequences of blowback, oversight, and impacts for the public.

== Examples ==
=== Nicaragua and Iran-Contra ===
In the 1980s, blowback was a central theme in legal and political debates about the efficacy of the Reagan Doctrine, which advocated for public and secret support of anti-Communist counter-revolutionaries. For example, secretly funding the secret war of the militarily-defeated, right-wing Contras against the left-wing Sandinista government of Nicaragua led to the Iran–Contra Affair, wherein the Reagan Administration sold American weapons to Iran (a state unfriendly to the US) to arm the Contras with Warsaw Pact weapons. This caused the Contras to do drug-dealing in American cities. Moreover, in the case of Nicaragua v. United States, the International Court of Justice ruled against the United States secret military attacks against Sandinista Nicaragua, because the countries were not formally at war.

Reagan Doctrine advocates, including The Heritage Foundation, argued that support for anti-Communists would topple Communist régimes without retaliatory consequences to the United States and help win the global Cold War.

=== Afghanistan and Al Qaeda ===
Examples of blowback include the CIA's financing and support for Afghan insurgents to fight an anti-Communist proxy guerilla war against the USSR in Afghanistan; some of the beneficiaries of this CIA support may have joined Al-Qaeda's terrorist campaign against the United States. Spencer Ackerman and Dave Zirin have both described the 2025 Washington, D.C., National Guard shooting as a case of "imperial blowback", i.e. the unintended consequence of US covert operations in Afghanistan.

=== France and the Central African Empire ===
Initially, France aided Jean-Bédel Bokassa's regime in the Central African Empire (now Central African Republic) due to the regime's consistent supply of uranium to France. France needed uranium for its nuclear weapons and energy program during the Cold War. French relations with the CAR eroded due to the 1979 Ngaragba Prison massacre. Eventually, France overthrew Bokassa and replaced him with David Dacko in Operation Caban and Operation Barracuda.

=== Iran ===
The 1953 Iranian coup d'état was orchestrated against the Prime Minister of Iran Mohammad Mosaddegh by the United States and the United Kingdom along with pro-Pahlavi forces in order to put the pro-Western Shah Mohammad Reza Pahlavi and new Prime Minister Fazlollah Zahedi into power to establish a pro-Western stronghold in the Middle East. In the ensuing 25 years of Pahlavi's rule, the state's secret police and intelligence agency SAVAK oppressed thousands of political dissidents with surveillance, torture, and murder. The combined effects of this repression contributed to a climate of fear that destroyed secular political alternatives and drove opposition elements of the regime into mosques. The future Supreme Leader of Iran Ruhollah Khomeini capitalized on the opposition increasingly turning to Shi'ite mosques and religious networks with influential sermons that were smuggled into the country on cassette tapes or printed to organize the disenfranchised and disenchanted Iranian public against the Pahlavi regime. Islamic clerics and students would finally rise up in the 1979 Iranian Revolution and establish the current Islamic Republic of Iran under the leadership of Khomeini. This state quickly became extremely hostile to the Western world and broke ties with the United States and its allies.

=== Syria and ISIS ===
During the Syrian Civil War, the United States and Saudi Arabia supported and aided anti-Assad armed groups. Some of those groups later shifted loyalty to ISIS.

=== Abkhazia and Chechnya ===
Russian military intelligence helped recruit, arm and organise volunteers from across the North Caucasus to fight alongside Abkhaz separatists in the War in Abkhazia (1992–1993). The volunteers were organised under the banner of the Confederation of Mountain Peoples of the Caucasus, and included Shamil Basayev, Ruslan Gelayev and Umalt Deshayev. The contingent's leader, Musa Shanibov, incited ethnic violence against Georgians in Abkhazia.

The year after the Abkhazia war concluded, the First Chechen War begun, and many of the men who had volunteered in Abkhazia took up arms against Russia. Besayev, Gelayev and Deshayev each led contingents made up of Chechen former volunteers, who were known as "Abkhaz battalions," due to their history. They helped to defeat Russia during that war, before suffering a defeat themselves in the Second Chechen War.

Gelayev sought refuge in Georgian territory during 2001-2002. In 2001 he led an assault on separatist Abkhazia on behalf of Georgian interests, sometimes referred to as the Kodori crisis, thus fighting against the same forces whom he had fought alongside a decade earlier. Gelayev's presence in Georgia was the proximate cause of the Pankisi Gorge crisis.

Many Chechen volunteers subsequently regretted their prior involvement in the Abkhazia war. All three of the Chechen military leaders that emerged from the volunteer units created by Russia were ultimately killed by Russia itself.

=== Yevno Azef and Russian Imperial secret police ===
Russian socialist revolutionary Yevno Azef, as a paid police informant, provided the Russian secret-police Okhrana with information to allow them to arrest an influential member of the Socialist Revolutionary Party. After the arrest, Azef assumed the vacant position and organized assassinations, including those of the director of Imperial Russia's police and later Minister of the Interior Vyacheslav Plehve (1904) and Grand Duke Sergei Alexandrovich, the Tsar's uncle (1905). By 1908, Azef was playing the double role of a revolutionary assassin and police spy who received 1000 rubles a month from the authorities.

=== Soviet disinformation blowback ===
Soviet intelligence, as part of active measures, frequently spread disinformation to distort their adversaries' decision-making. However, sometimes this information filtered back through the KGB's own contacts, leading to distorted reports. Lawrence Bittman also addressed Soviet intelligence blowback in The KGB and Soviet Disinformation, stating that "There are, of course, instances in which the operator is partially or completely exposed and subjected to countermeasures taken by the government of the target country."

=== Terrorism ===
Terrorism has been described as blowback, often due to the backlash towards the global and regional powers involving controversial foreign policy decisions made within the context of issues affecting the Global South.

== See also ==
- Blowback (podcast)
- Allegations of CIA assistance to Osama bin Laden
- Boomerang effect (psychology)
- French Connection
- Guatemalan Civil War
- Office of Public Diplomacy
- Plausible deniability
- Reagan Doctrine
- Unintended consequences
- Security dilemma
- Israeli support for Hamas
- Civilian casualties from the United States drone strikes
- Camp Bucca
- Abu Ghraib torture and prisoner abuse
- Imperial boomerang
- 2016 shooting of Dallas police officers

=== People ===
- Chalmers Johnson
- João Goulart
- Mohammad Mosaddeq
- Qasem Soleimani
