= Richard P. Mitchell =

American academic and author

Richard Paul Mitchell (1925–1983) was a history professor at the University of Michigan and a foreign intelligence officer. (Note: According to Lawrence Martin-Bittman in his book The KGB and Soviet Disinformation, the letter was part of a Soviet disinformation campaign (note the "Richard B. Mitchell" typo)) He is the author of 27 works in 90 publications in 4 languages, and the award-winning book The Society of the Muslim Brothers.
