= Gabriel Harrison =

American actor (1818–1902)

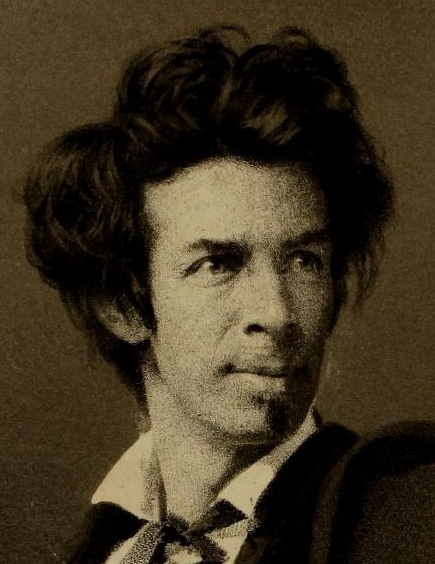
- Harrison c. 1851
- Born: March 25, 1818; Philadelphia, Pennsylvania, U.S.
- Died: December 15, 1902 (aged 84); Brooklyn, New York City, U.S.

Gabriel Harrison (March 25, 1818 – December 15, 1902) was an American photographer, actor, playwright, painter, and writer active in New York City.

== Early life ==
Harrison was born in Philadelphia on March 25, 1818, to an engraver father. He moved to New York City with his family at age six and made his theatrical debut in 1838 as the title character in Shakespeare's Othello opposite Lester Wallack.

== Career ==
Harrison began his photography career in the gallery of John Plumbe around 1844, and worked for Martin M. Lawrence from 1847 to 1851. He moved to Brooklyn in 1851, opened his own gallery in Brooklyn in 1852, and remained in photography until the early 1860s. His notable photographs include a daguerreotype of Walt Whitman that was used as the engravement for the title page of Leaves of Grass, The Infant Savior bearing the cross (ca. 1850), and California News, a daguerreotype noted for its staged narrative rather than being a simple portrait.

His written works include a dramatization of Hawthorne's The Scarlet Letter and biographies of actors John Howard Payne and Edwin Forrest.

Harrison supported free art schools in connection with the Brooklyn Academy of Design, which he co-founded, and was also a portrait and landscape painter.

== Death ==
Harrison died in Brooklyn at age 84. His children include daughters Viola and Beatrice and son George Washington Harrison.

== Works ==
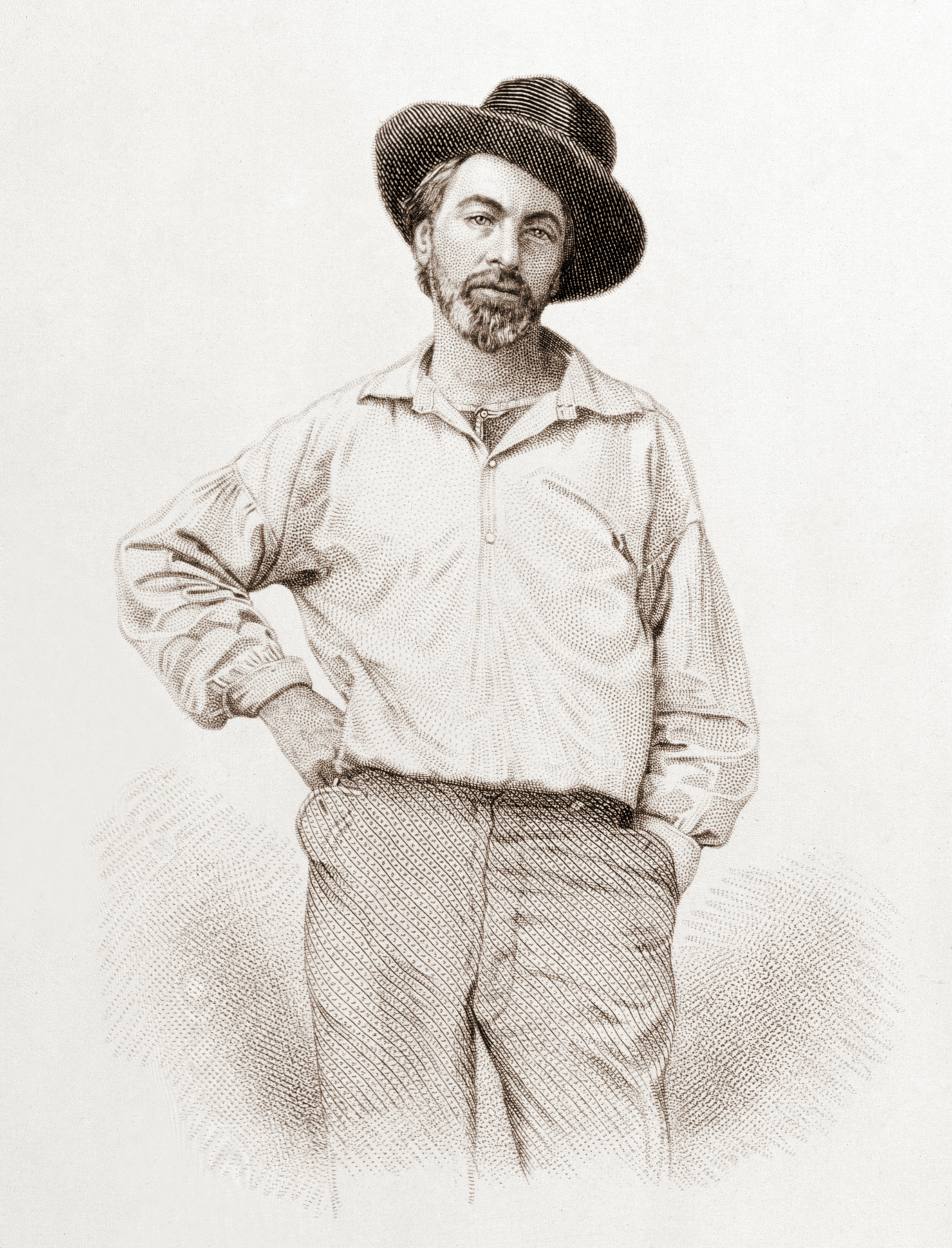
Steel engraving of Walt Whitman by Samuel Hollyer, after a lost daguerreotype by Harrison

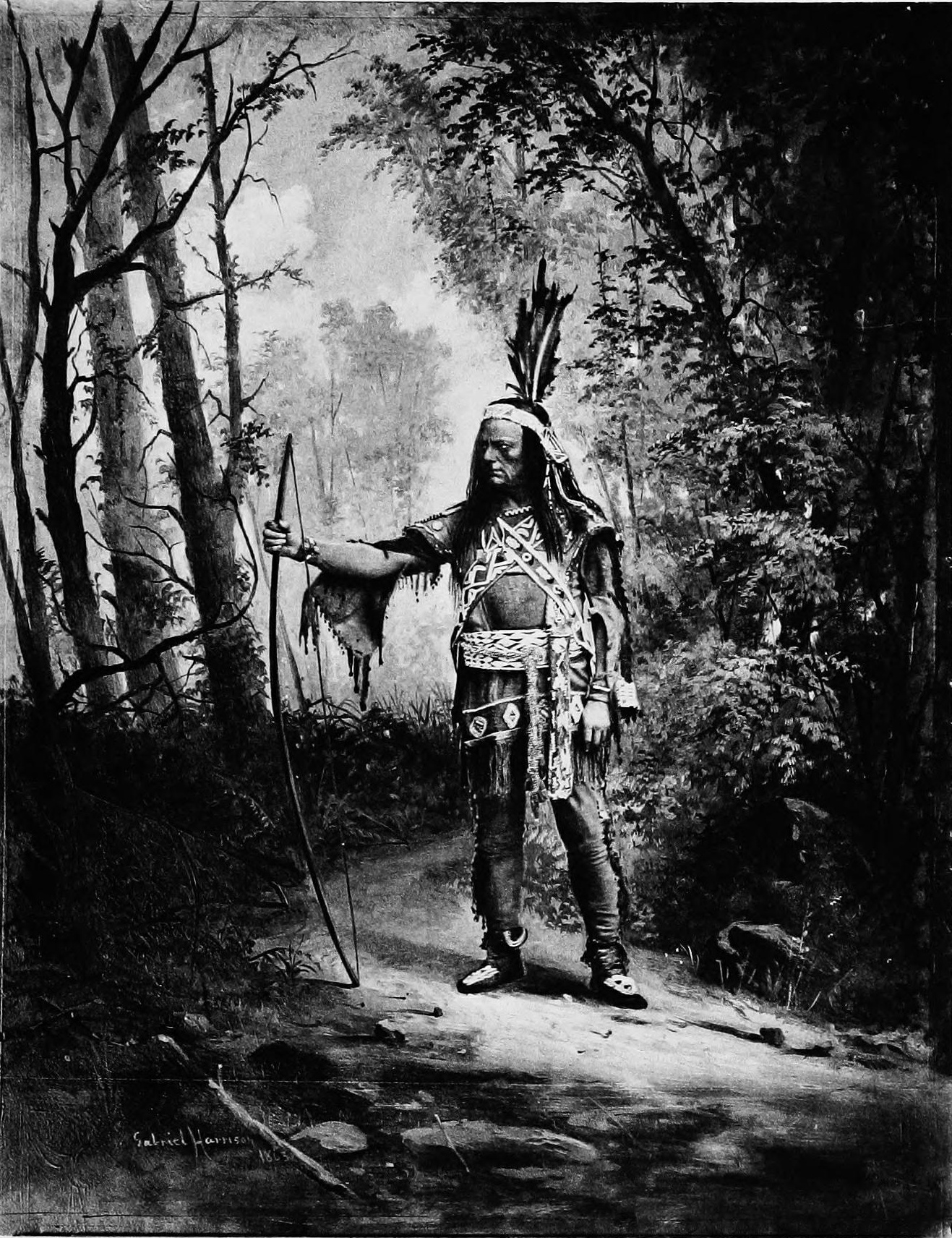
Edwin Forrest as Metamora

Plays:

- The Scarlet Letter (Note: A Centennial Dramatic Offering: A Romantic Drama, in Four Acts, entitled The Scarlet Letter) (1876)

Books:

- The Life and Writings of John Howard Payne (1875)
- A History of the Progress of the Drama, Music and the Fine Arts in the City of Brooklyn (1884)
- Edwin Forrest: The Actor and the Man (1889)
