= Law of the suppression of radical potential =

Concept in communication theory

The law of the suppression of radical potential is an idea first described by Brian Winston in his book, Misunderstanding Media. It states that when a communications technology is realized, its growth is suppressed through the constraining influence of already prevailing institutions and other mechanisms.

Winston shows how the law can be used as a model for describing the life cycle of many communications technologies. His approach is in particular directed against technological determinism and instead proposes that the emergence of new media and new technologies is mediated and controlled by society. According to Winston, a supervening social necessity creates a need for a particular technology, but the law of the suppression of radical potential means that new technology will be integrated into the status quo as opposed to radically disrupting it.

Winston has elaborated his model of technological change in particular in the books Technologies of Seeing: Photography, Cinematography and Television (1997) and Media Technology and Society: A History: From the Telegraph to the Internet (1998; Kindle publication in 2007 )
