= Geography of the Czech Republic =

Geography of Czech Republic
- Continent: Europe
- Region: Central Europe
- Area: Ranked 115th
  - Total: 78,871 km^{2} (30,452 sq mi)
  - Land: 97.88%
  - Water: 2.12%
- Coastline: 0 km (0 mi)
- Borders: 2290.7 km: Germany – 810.3 km; Poland – 761.8 km; Austria – 466.3 km; Slovakia – 252.3 km
- Highest point: Sněžka, 1603.3 m
- Lowest point: Hřensko, 115 m
- Longest river: Vltava, 433 km
- Largest lake: Černé jezero, 18.4 ha
- Climate: temperate, continental
- Terrain: hills and lowlands surrounded by low mountains
- Natural resources: kaolin, lithium, graphite, black coal, brown coal, uranium, timber

The Czech Republic is a landlocked country in Central Europe. It is bordered by Germany to the west, Austria to the south, Slovakia to the east and Poland to the north. It consists mostly of low hills and plateaus surrounded along the borders by low mountains. Two areas of lowlands follow the Elbe river and the Morava river. About a third of the area of the Czech Republic is covered by forests.

The Czech Republic also possesses Moldauhafen, a 30,000 m^{2} enclave in the middle of Hamburg docks in Germany, which was awarded to Czechoslovakia by Article 363 of the Treaty of Versailles to allow the landlocked country a place where goods transported down river could be transferred to seagoing ships. This territory reverts to Germany in 2028.

== Physical geography ==
=== Climate ===
Köppen climate classification of the Czech Republic

The Czech Republic's climate is temperate, transitional between an oceanic climate and a continental climate. The summers are rather cool and dry, with average temperatures in most areas around 20 °C, the winters are fairly mild and wet with temperatures averaging around 0 °C in most areas. The relative humidity varies between 60% and 80%.

==== Examples ====
Climate data for Prague (1981–2010 normals, extremes 1775–present)
Month	Jan	Feb	Mar	Apr	May	Jun	Jul	Aug	Sep	Oct	Nov	Dec	Year
Record high °C (°F)	17.4 (63.3)	19.2 (66.6)	22.5 (72.5)	28.8 (83.8)	32.5 (90.5)	37.9 (100.2)	37.8 (100.0)	37.4 (99.3)	33.1 (91.6)	27.0 (80.6)	19.5 (67.1)	17.4 (63.3)	37.9 (100.2)
Mean daily maximum °C (°F)	2.6 (36.7)	4.4 (39.9)	9.1 (48.4)	15.1 (59.2)	20.3 (68.5)	22.8 (73.0)	25.3 (77.5)	25.1 (77.2)	19.9 (67.8)	14.2 (57.6)	7.2 (45.0)	3.4 (38.1)	14.1 (57.4)
Daily mean °C (°F)	0.1 (32.2)	1.3 (34.3)	5.3 (41.5)	10.1 (50.2)	15.0 (59.0)	17.8 (64.0)	19.9 (67.8)	19.6 (67.3)	15.2 (59.4)	10.3 (50.5)	4.6 (40.3)	1.1 (34.0)	10.0 (50.0)
Mean daily minimum °C (°F)	−2.4 (27.7)	−1.8 (28.8)	1.5 (34.7)	5.1 (41.2)	9.7 (49.5)	12.7 (54.9)	14.5 (58.1)	14.2 (57.6)	10.5 (50.9)	6.4 (43.5)	2.1 (35.8)	−1.1 (30.0)	6.0 (42.7)
Record low °C (°F)	−27.5 (−17.5)	−27.1 (−16.8)	−27.6 (−17.7)	−8 (18)	−2.3 (27.9)	1.9 (35.4)	6.7 (44.1)	6.4 (43.5)	0.7 (33.3)	−7.5 (18.5)	−16.9 (1.6)	−24.8 (−12.6)	−27.6 (−17.7)
Average precipitation mm (inches)	34 (1.3)	30 (1.2)	40 (1.6)	34 (1.3)	63 (2.5)	70 (2.8)	82 (3.2)	75 (3.0)	47 (1.9)	34 (1.3)	40 (1.6)	38 (1.5)	587 (23.1)
Average snowfall cm (inches)	17.9 (7.0)	15.9 (6.3)	10.3 (4.1)	2.9 (1.1)	0.0 (0.0)	0.0 (0.0)	0.0 (0.0)	0.0 (0.0)	0.0 (0.0)	0.1 (0.0)	8.4 (3.3)	15.9 (6.3)	71.4 (28.1)
Average precipitation days	5.7	5.2	6.6	5.8	8.5	9.4	8.9	8.4	7.3	5.5	7.1	5.9	84.3
Average relative humidity (%)	86	83	77	69	70	71	70	71	76	81	87	88	77
Average dew point °C (°F)	−4.6 (23.7)	−3.5 (25.7)	−1.1 (30.0)	2.0 (35.6)	7.0 (44.6)	10.3 (50.5)	11.6 (52.9)	11.5 (52.7)	9.1 (48.4)	5.1 (41.2)	0.6 (33.1)	−2.9 (26.8)	3.8 (38.8)
Mean monthly sunshine hours	50.0	72.4	124.7	167.6	214.0	218.3	226.2	212.3	161.0	120.8	53.9	46.7	1,667.9
Average ultraviolet index	1	1	3	4	6	7	6	6	4	2	1	1	4
Source: World Meteorological Organization (temperature and rainfall 1981–2010) NOAA and Weather Atlas

Climate data for Brno (Brno-Tuřany Airport), 1981–2010 normals, extremes 1939-present
Month	Jan	Feb	Mar	Apr	May	Jun	Jul	Aug	Sep	Oct	Nov	Dec	Year
Record high °C (°F)	16.0 (60.8)	17.6 (63.7)	24.0 (75.2)	29.5 (85.1)	31.8 (89.2)	36.6 (97.9)	36.4 (97.5)	37.8 (100.0)	32.2 (90.0)	27.7 (81.9)	19.3 (66.7)	19.0 (66.2)	37.8 (100.0)
Mean daily maximum °C (°F)	1.1 (34.0)	3.6 (38.5)	8.7 (47.7)	15.1 (59.2)	20.1 (68.2)	23.0 (73.4)	25.6 (78.1)	25.4 (77.7)	20.0 (68.0)	13.8 (56.8)	6.9 (44.4)	2.0 (35.6)	13.8 (56.8)
Daily mean °C (°F)	−2.5 (27.5)	−0.3 (31.5)	3.8 (38.8)	9.0 (48.2)	13.9 (57.0)	17.0 (62.6)	18.5 (65.3)	18.1 (64.6)	14.3 (57.7)	9.1 (48.4)	3.5 (38.3)	−0.6 (30.9)	8.7 (47.7)
Mean daily minimum °C (°F)	−4.3 (24.3)	−3.3 (26.1)	0.2 (32.4)	4.5 (40.1)	9.3 (48.7)	12.1 (53.8)	14.0 (57.2)	13.8 (56.8)	10.0 (50.0)	5.7 (42.3)	1.1 (34.0)	−2.9 (26.8)	5.0 (41.0)
Record low °C (°F)	−24.1 (−11.4)	−22.2 (−8.0)	−18.9 (−2.0)	−7 (19)	−2.8 (27.0)	0.0 (32.0)	1.1 (34.0)	2.8 (37.0)	−2.2 (28.0)	−6.5 (20.3)	−13 (9)	−21 (−6)	−24.1 (−11.4)
Average precipitation mm (inches)	23.1 (0.91)	23.4 (0.92)	29.7 (1.17)	28.9 (1.14)	61.2 (2.41)	72.2 (2.84)	69.0 (2.72)	55.7 (2.19)	47.9 (1.89)	31.1 (1.22)	34.0 (1.34)	31.9 (1.26)	508.1 (20.00)
Average snowfall cm (inches)	17.4 (6.9)	12.4 (4.9)	5.2 (2.0)	0.6 (0.2)	0.0 (0.0)	0.0 (0.0)	0.0 (0.0)	0.0 (0.0)	0.0 (0.0)	0.0 (0.0)	4.5 (1.8)	12.5 (4.9)	52.6 (20.7)
Average precipitation days	5.8	5.3	6.4	5.7	8.1	8.6	9.1	7.4	6.5	6.3	7.1	7.5	83.8
Average relative humidity (%)	84	81	73	65	67	69	67	68	73	78	84	85	75
Mean monthly sunshine hours	53.8	82.9	137.5	208.7	226.4	246.9	245.7	246.3	175.5	112.5	59.3	44.5	1,840
Average ultraviolet index	1	1	3	4	6	7	7	6	4	2	1	1	4
Source 1: World Meteorological Organization (UN)
Source 2: NOAA

Climate data for Ostrava (1981−2010 normals, extremes 1980−present)
Month	Jan	Feb	Mar	Apr	May	Jun	Jul	Aug	Sep	Oct	Nov	Dec	Year
Record high °C (°F)	14.2 (57.6)	17.3 (63.1)	22.8 (73.0)	29.0 (84.2)	31.9 (89.4)	35.2 (95.4)	36.7 (98.1)	36.9 (98.4)	33.7 (92.7)	26.2 (79.2)	22.5 (72.5)	16.7 (62.1)	36.9 (98.4)
Mean daily maximum °C (°F)	0.4 (32.7)	2.8 (37.0)	7.7 (45.9)	13.5 (56.3)	18.9 (66.0)	21.9 (71.4)	23.6 (74.5)	23.4 (74.1)	19.4 (66.9)	14.0 (57.2)	6.7 (44.1)	2.0 (35.6)	12.9 (55.1)
Mean daily minimum °C (°F)	−5.6 (21.9)	−4.1 (24.6)	−0.8 (30.6)	3.0 (37.4)	7.3 (45.1)	10.6 (51.1)	11.9 (53.4)	11.6 (52.9)	8.7 (47.7)	4.7 (40.5)	0.9 (33.6)	−3.2 (26.2)	3.7 (38.7)
Record low °C (°F)	−29.3 (−20.7)	−24.7 (−12.5)	−21.9 (−7.4)	−7.8 (18.0)	−3.0 (26.6)	1.2 (34.2)	4.2 (39.6)	3.8 (38.8)	−0.6 (30.9)	−7.6 (18.3)	−18.7 (−1.7)	−25.8 (−14.4)	−29.3 (−20.7)
Average precipitation mm (inches)	26.7 (1.05)	30.2 (1.19)	34.0 (1.34)	52.4 (2.06)	91.2 (3.59)	104.4 (4.11)	91.1 (3.59)	91.8 (3.61)	58.8 (2.31)	42.3 (1.67)	44.6 (1.76)	34.3 (1.35)	701.8 (27.63)
Average precipitation days	7	7	7	8	11	11	11	10	8	7	9	8	104
Source 1: World Meteorological Organisation (UN)
Source 2: infoclimat.fr

=== Geology ===
Most of the area of the Czech Republic belongs to the geographically stable Bohemian Massif. Only an area of the Western Carpathians in the east of the country is younger, lifted during the Tertiary. Igneous rocks make up the base of the Bohemian Massif. Sedimentary rocks are mostly found in the north-eastern part of Bohemia with significant areas of sandstone. Among the metamorphic rocks, the most commonly found is Gneiss.

=== Mountains ===
The most notable mountain ranges in the Czech Republic are all found along the borders of the country. In Bohemia it is the Bohemian Forest and Ore Mountains, both bordering Germany. Then the long region of Sudetes with several mountains ranges, including the Giant Mountains with Sněžka – the highest peak of the Czech Republic. The last major mountain range is the Moravian-Silesian Beskids in the east.

=== Rivers ===
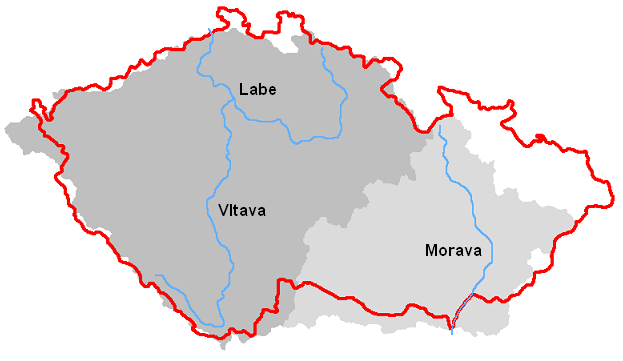
Drainage areas of the Elbe and the Morava rivers

There are four major rivers in the Czech Republic. The Elbe (locally "Labe") flows from the Giant Mountains in the north east of Bohemia to the west and then through northern Germany all the way to the North Sea. The Morava River drains most of Moravia and flows to the south into the Danube and ultimately to the Black Sea. The Oder starts in the Moravian Silesia and flows north through Poland into the Baltic Sea. The fourth major river is the Vltava, which is the longest river of the Czech Republic and drains the southern part of Bohemia before flowing into the Elbe at Mělník.

=== Bodies of water ===
Natural occurring bodies of water are rather scarce; most of the significant bodies of water are man-made ponds and reservoirs. The largest pond is the Rožmberk Pond, which is one of the system of fish ponds built in the 16th century around Třeboň. The largest reservoir by area covered is the Lipno Reservoir (4,870 ha), built in the 1950s and the largest reservoir by volume is Orlík Reservoir (716 million m^{3}), built around the same time. The largest and deepest natural lake is Černé jezero (18.4 ha).

== Human geography ==
=== Population geography ===
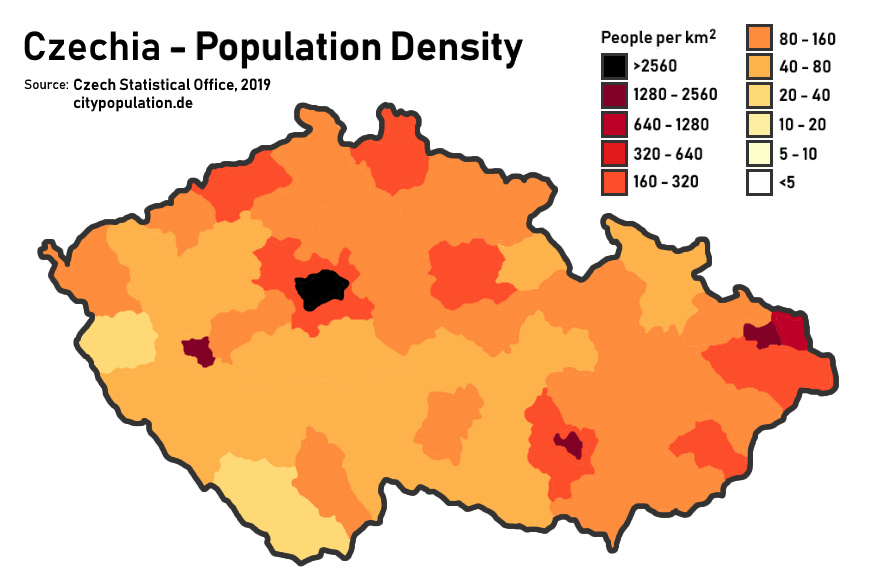
Population density in the Czech Republic

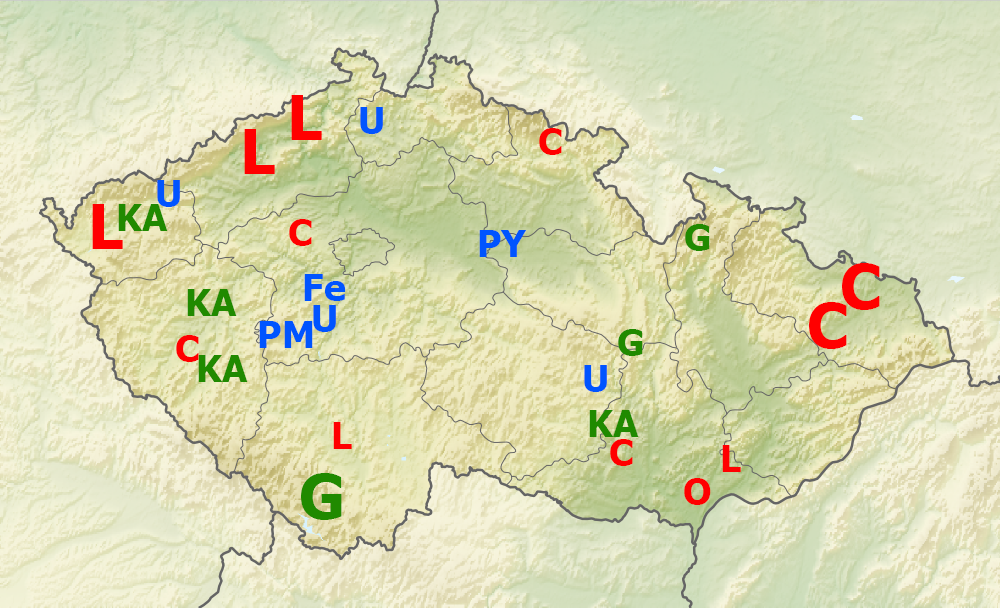
Natural resources: Metals are in blue: Fe — iron ore, PY — pyrite, PM – polymetal ores (Cu, Zn, Pb, etc.), U — uranium. Fossil fuels are in red: C — coal, L — lignite, O – oil. Non-metallic minerals are in green: G — graphite, KA — kaolinite.

The population of the Czech Republic is estimated to be around 10.6 million. The highest population density is in the larger metropolitan area of Ostrava and of course in the area around the capital of Prague. The lowest population density is in the Czech-German and Czech-Austrian borderlands, mostly as a lasting result of the expulsion of Germans from Czechoslovakia after the World War II.

=== Political geography ===
The Czech Republic is divided into thirteen regions and one capital city with regional status. The older administrative units of seventy-six districts are still recognized and remain the seats of various branches of state administration. Historically, the Czech Republic can be split into three regions: Bohemia in the west, Moravia in the east and Czech Silesia in the north east.

=== Industry and agriculture ===
Areas affected the most by heavy industry are the Sokolov Basin and the Most Basin in the north-west of the Czech Republic. The extensive deposits of brown coal in those areas are mostly used for electricity production. It is estimated, that almost 40% of all electric power produced in the Czech Republic comes from burning brown coal mined in these areas. Plant agriculture is focused around the lowlands surrounding the Elbe and the Morava. Around 34% of the country is covered by forests and approximately 37% of land is arable. The estimated area of irrigated land is 385 km^{2}, and freshwater withdrawal per capita is around 164 m^{3} every year.

== See also ==
- Protected areas of the Czech Republic
- Rivers of the Czech Republic
- List of highest mountains of the Czech Republic
