= Martin Lawrence (disambiguation) =

Martin Lawrence (born 1965) is an American comedian and actor.

Martin Lawrence may also refer to:

- Martin M. Lawrence (1808–1859), American photographer
- Martin Lawrence, precursor to the British publishing company Lawrence & Wishart
- Martin Lawrence Galleries, a chain of art galleries

== See also ==
- Lawrence Martin (disambiguation)
