= Cold War (1962–1979) =

Phase of the Cold War during 1962–1979

The Cold War (1962–1979) refers to the phase within the Cold War that spanned the period between the aftermath of the Cuban Missile Crisis in late October 1962, through the détente period beginning in 1969, to the end of détente in the late 1970s.

The United States maintained its Cold War engagement with the Soviet Union during the period, despite internal preoccupations with the assassination of John F. Kennedy, the Civil Rights Movement and the opposition to United States involvement in the Vietnam War.

In 1968, Eastern Bloc member Czechoslovakia attempted the reforms of the Prague Spring and was subsequently invaded by the Soviet Union and other Warsaw Pact members, who reinstated the Soviet model. By 1973, the US had withdrawn from the Vietnam War. While communists gained power in some South East Asian countries, they were divided by the Sino-Soviet Split, with China moving closer to the Western camp, following US President Richard Nixon's visit to China. In the 1960s and 1970s, the Third World was increasingly divided between governments backed by the Soviets (such as Libya, Iraq, Syria, Egypt and South Yemen), governments backed by NATO (such as Saudi Arabia), and a growing camp of non-aligned nations.

== Third World and non-alignment in the 1960s and 1970s ==
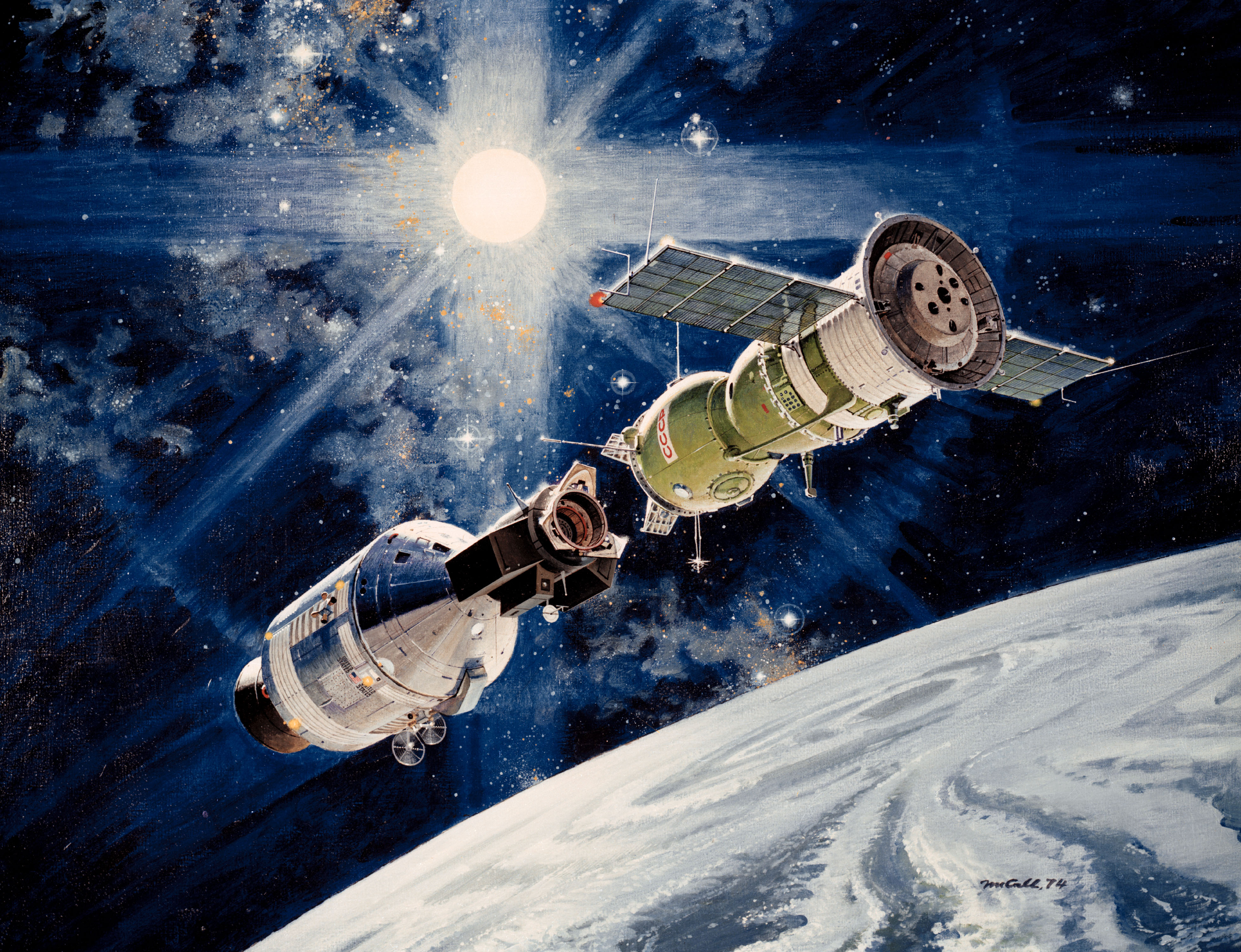
The 1975 Apollo-Soyuz space rendez-vous, one of the attempts at cooperation between the US and the USSR during the détente

=== Decolonization ===
Cold War politics were affected by decolonization in Africa, Asia, and to a limited extent, Latin America as well. The economic needs of emerging Third World states made them vulnerable to foreign influence and pressure. The era was characterized by a proliferation of anti-colonial national liberation movements, backed predominantly by the Soviet Union and the People's Republic of China. The Soviet leadership took a keen interest in the affairs of the fledgling ex-colonies because it hoped the cultivation of socialist clients there would deny their economic and strategic resources to the West. Eager to build its own global constituency, the People's Republic of China attempted to assume a leadership role among the decolonizing territories as well, appealing to its image as a non-white, non-European agrarian nation which too had suffered from the depredations of Western imperialism. Both nations promoted global decolonization as an opportunity to redress the balance of the world against Western Europe and the United States, and claimed that the political and economic problems of colonized peoples made them naturally inclined towards socialism.

Western fears of a conventional war with the communist bloc over the colonies soon shifted into fears of communist subversion and infiltration by proxy. The great disparities of wealth in many of the colonies between the colonized indigenous population and the colonizers provided fertile ground for the adoption of socialist ideology among many anti-colonial parties. This provided ammunition for Western propaganda which denounced many anti-colonial movements as being communist proxies.

As pressure for decolonization mounted, the departing colonial regimes attempted to transfer power to moderate and stable local governments committed to continued economic and political ties with the West. Political transitions were not always peaceful; for example, violence broke out in Anglophone Southern Cameroons due to an unpopular union with Francophone Cameroon following independence from those respective nations. The Congo Crisis broke out with the dissolution of the Belgian Congo, after the new Congolese army mutinied against its Belgian officers, resulting in an exodus of the European population and plunging the territory into a civil war which raged throughout the mid-1960s. Portugal attempted to actively resist decolonization and was forced to contend with nationalist insurgencies in all of its African colonies until 1975. The presence of significant numbers of white settlers in Rhodesia complicated attempts at decolonization there, and the former actually issued a unilateral declaration of independence in 1965 to preempt an immediate transition to majority rule. The breakaway white government retained power in Rhodesia until 1979, despite a United Nations embargo and a devastating civil war with two rival guerrilla factions backed by the Soviets and Chinese, respectively.

=== Alliances ===
Some developing countries devised a strategy that turned the Cold War into what they called "creative confrontation" – playing off the Cold War participants to their own advantage while maintaining non-aligned status. The diplomatic policy of non-alignment regarded the Cold War as a tragic and frustrating facet of international affairs, obstructing the overriding task of consolidating fledgling states and their attempts to end economic backwardness, poverty, and disease. Non-alignment held that peaceful coexistence with the first-world and second-world nations was both preferable and possible. India's Jawaharlal Nehru saw neutralism as a means of forging a "third force" among non-aligned nations, much as France's Charles de Gaulle attempted to do in Europe in the 1960s. The Egyptian leader Gamal Abdel Nasser manoeuvres between the blocs in pursuit of his goals was one example of this.

The first such effort, the Asian Relations Conference, held in New Delhi in 1947, pledged support for all national movements against colonial rule and explored the basic problems of Asian peoples. Perhaps the most famous Third World conclave was the Bandung Conference of African and Asian nations in 1955 to discuss mutual interests and strategy, which ultimately led to the establishment of the Non-Aligned Movement in 1961. The conference was attended by twenty-nine countries representing more than half the population of the world. As at New Delhi, anti-imperialism, economic development, and cultural cooperation were the principal topics. There was a strong push in the Third World to secure a voice in the councils of nations, especially the United Nations, and to receive recognition of their new sovereign status. Representatives of these new states were also extremely sensitive to slights and discriminations, particularly if they were based on race. In all the nations of the Third World, living standards were wretchedly low. Some, such as India, Nigeria, and Indonesia, were becoming regional powers, most were too small and poor to aspire to this status.

Initially having a roster of 51 members, the UN General Assembly had increased to 126 by 1970. The dominance of Western members dropped to 40% of the membership, with Afro-Asian states holding the balance of power. The ranks of the General Assembly swelled rapidly as former colonies won independence, thus forming a substantial voting bloc with members from Latin America. Anti-imperialist sentiment, reinforced by the communists, often translated into anti-Western positions, but the primary agenda among non-aligned countries was to secure passage of social and economic assistance measures. Superpower refusal to fund such programs has often undermined the effectiveness of the non-aligned coalition, however. The Bandung Conference symbolized continuing efforts to establish regional organizations designed to forge unity of policy and economic cooperation among Third World nations. The Organization of African Unity (OAU) was created in Addis Ababa, Ethiopia, in 1963 because African leaders believed that disunity played into the hands of the superpowers. The OAU was designed

to promote the unity and solidarity of the African states; to coordinate and intensify the cooperation and efforts to achieve a better life for the peoples of Africa; to defend their sovereignty; to eradicate all forms of colonialism in Africa and to promote international cooperation...

The OAU required a policy of non-alignment from each of its 30 member states and spawned several subregional economic groups similar in concept to the European Common Market. The OAU has also pursued a policy of political cooperation with other Third World regional coalitions, especially with Arab countries.

Much of the frustration expressed by non-aligned nations stemmed from the vastly unequal relationship between rich and poor states. The resentment, strongest where key resources and local economies have been exploited by multinational Western corporations, has had a major impact on world events. The formation of the Organization of Petroleum Exporting Countries (OPEC) in 1960 reflected these concerns. OPEC devised a strategy of counter-penetration, whereby it hoped to make industrial economies that relied heavily on oil imports vulnerable to Third World pressures. Initially, the strategy had resounding success. Dwindling foreign aid from the United States and its allies, coupled with the West's pro-Israel policies, angered the Arab nations in OPEC. In 1973, the group quadrupled the price of crude oil. The sudden rise in the energy costs intensified inflation and recession in the West and underscored the interdependence of world societies. The next year the non-aligned bloc in the United Nations passed a resolution demanding the creation of a new international economic order in which resources, trade, and markets would be distributed fairly.

Non-aligned states forged still other forms of economic cooperation as leverage against the superpowers. OPEC, the OAU, and the Arab League had overlapping members, and in the 1970s the Arabs began extending huge financial assistance to African nations in an effort to reduce African economic dependence on the United States and the Soviet Union. However, the Arab League has been torn by dissension between authoritarian pro-Soviet states, such as Nasser's Egypt and Assad's Syria, and the aristocratic-monarchial (and generally pro-Western) regimes, such as Saudi Arabia and Oman. And while the OAU has witnessed some gains in African cooperation, its members were generally primarily interested in pursuing their own national interests rather than those of continental dimensions. At a 1977 Afro-Arab summit conference in Cairo, oil producers pledged $1.5 billion in aid to Africa. Recent divisions within OPEC have made concerted action more difficult. Nevertheless, the 1973 world oil shock provided dramatic evidence of the potential power of resource suppliers in dealing with the more developed world.

=== Escalations ===
Under the Lyndon B. Johnson administration, the US took a more hardline stance on Latin America—sometimes called the "Mann Doctrine". In 1964, the Brazilian military overthrew the government of João Goulart with US backing. In April 1965, the US sent 22,000 troops to the Dominican Republic in an intervention, into the Dominican Civil War between supporters of deposed president Juan Bosch and supporters of General Elías Wessin y Wessin, citing the threat of the emergence of a Cuban-style revolution in Latin America. The OAS deployed soldiers through the mostly Brazilian Inter-American Peace Force. Héctor García-Godoy acted as provisional president, until conservative former president Joaquín Balaguer won the 1966 presidential election against non-campaigning Juan Bosch. Activists for Bosch's Dominican Revolutionary Party were violently harassed by the Dominican police and armed forces.

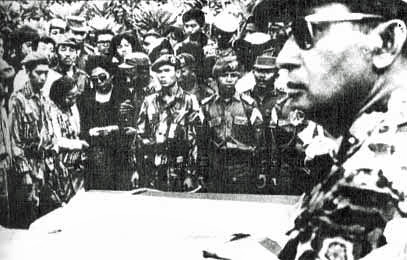
Suharto of Indonesia attending funeral of five generals slain in 30 September Movement, 2 October 1965

In Indonesia, the hardline anti-communist General Suharto wrested control from predecessor Sukarno in an attempt to establish a "New Order". From 1965 to 1966, with the aid of the US and other Western governments, (Note: Robinson 2018, p. 203: "A US Embassy official in Jakarta, Robert Martens, had supplied the Indonesian Army with lists containing the names of thousands of PKI officials in the months after the alleged coup attempt. According to the journalist Kathy Kadane, "As many as 5,000 names were furnished over a period of months to the Army there, and the Americans later checked off the names of those who had been killed or captured." Despite Martens later denials of any such intent, these actions almost certainly aided in the death or detention of many innocent people. They also sent a powerful message that the US government agreed with and supported the army's campaign against the PKI, even as that campaign took its terrible toll in human lives.") (Note: Simpson 2010, p. 193: "Washington did everything in its power to encourage and facilitate the army-led massacre of alleged PKI members, and U.S. officials worried only that the killing of the party's unarmed supporters might not go far enough, permitting Sukarno to return to power and frustrate the [Johnson] Administration's emerging plans for a post-Sukarno Indonesia. This was efficacious terror, an essential building block of the neoliberal policies that the West would attempt to impose on Indonesia after Sukarno's ouster.") the military led the mass killing of more than 500,000 members and sympathizers of the Indonesian Communist Party and other leftist organizations, and detained hundreds of thousands in prison camps under inhumane conditions. A top-secret CIA report stated that the massacres "rank as one of the worst mass murders of the 20th century, along with the Soviet purges of the 1930s, the Nazi mass murders during the Second World War, and the Maoist bloodbath of the early 1950s." These killings served US interests and constitute a major turning point in the Cold War as the balance of power shifted in Southeast Asia.

Escalating the scale of American intervention in the conflict between Ngô Đình Diệm's South Vietnamese government and the communist National Front for the Liberation of South Vietnam (NLF) insurgents opposing it, Johnson deployed 575,000 troops in Southeast Asia to defeat the NLF and their North Vietnamese allies in the Vietnam War, but his costly policy weakened the US economy and sparked domestic anti-war protests, which led to the US withdrawal by 1972. Without American support, South Vietnam was conquered by North Vietnam in 1975; the US reputation suffered as the world saw the defeat of a superpower at the hands of one of the poorest nations.

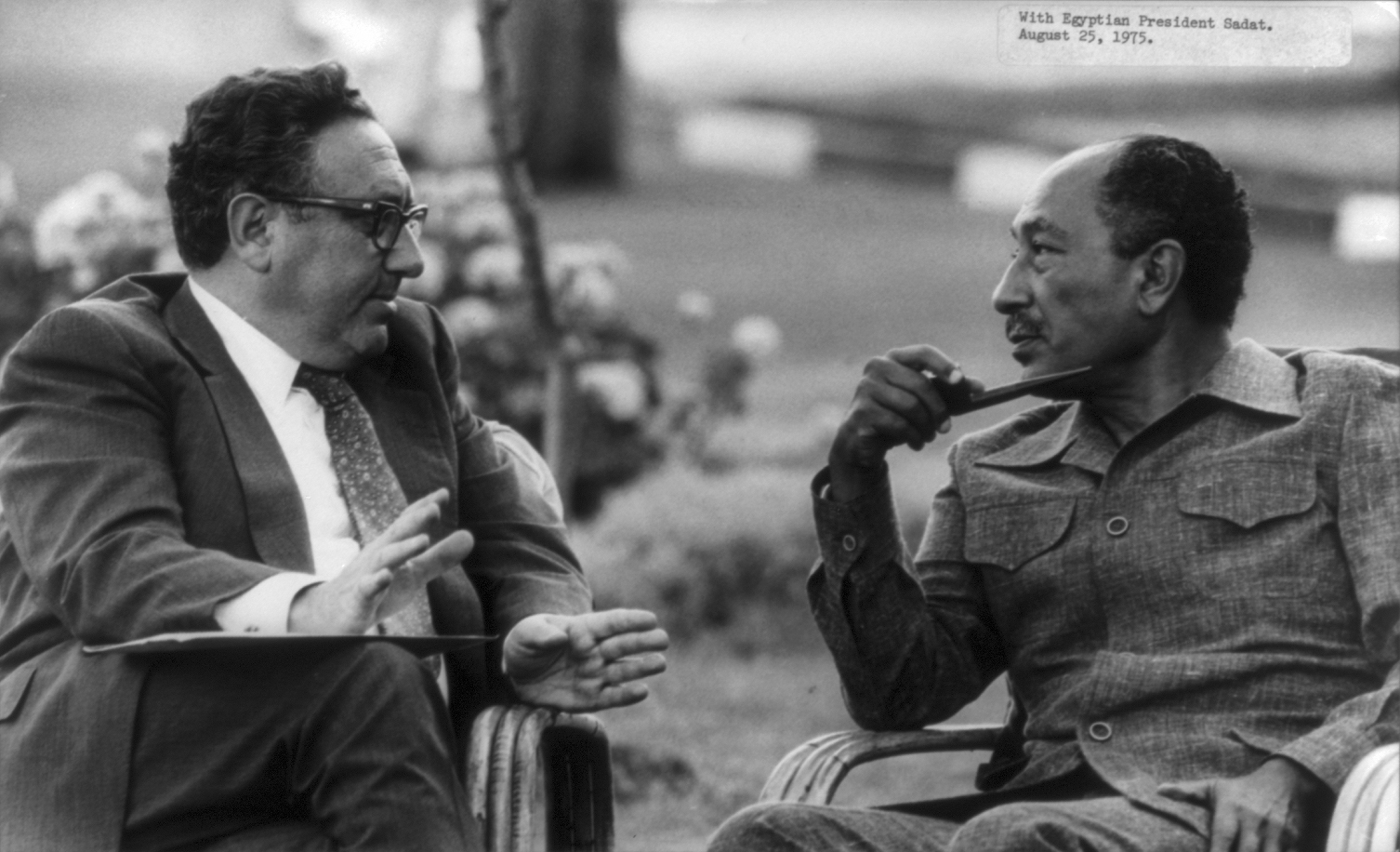
Egyptian leader Anwar Sadat with Henry Kissinger in 1975

The Middle East remained a source of contention. Egypt, which received the bulk of its arms and economic assistance from the USSR, was a troublesome client, with a reluctant Soviet Union feeling obliged to assist in the 1967 Six-Day War and the War of Attrition against pro-Western Israel. Despite the beginning of an Egyptian shift from a pro-Soviet to a pro-American orientation in 1972, the Soviets supported Egypt and Syria during the Yom Kippur War, as the US supported Israel. Although pre-Sadat Egypt had been the largest recipient of Soviet aid in the Middle East, the Soviets were successful in establishing close relations with communist South Yemen, as well as the nationalist governments of Algeria and Iraq. Iraq signed a 15-year Treaty of Friendship and Cooperation with the Soviet Union in 1972. According to Charles R. H. Tripp, the treaty upset "the US-sponsored security system established as part of the Arab Cold War. It appeared that any enemy of the Baghdad regime was a potential ally of the United States." In response, the US covertly financed Kurdish rebels during the Second Iraqi–Kurdish War; the Kurds were defeated in 1975, leading to the forcible relocation of hundreds of thousands of Kurdish civilians. Indirect Soviet assistance to the Palestinian side of the Israeli–Palestinian conflict included support for Yasser Arafat's Palestine Liberation Organization (PLO).

In East Africa, a territorial dispute between Somalia and Ethiopia over the Ogaden region resulted in the Ogaden War. Around June 1977, Somali troops occupied the Ogaden and began advancing inland towards Ethiopian positions in the Ahmar Mountains. Both countries were client states of the Soviet Union; Somalia was led by Marxist military leader Siad Barre, and Ethiopia was controlled by the Derg, a cabal of generals loyal to the pro-Soviet Mengistu Haile Mariam, who had declared the Provisional Military Government of Socialist Ethiopia in 1975. The Soviets initially attempted to exert a moderating influence on both states, but in November 1977 Barre broke off relations with Moscow and expelled his Soviet military advisers. He turned to China and the Safari Club—a group of pro-American intelligence agencies including those of Iran, Egypt, Saudi Arabia—for support. (Note: Bronson 2006, p. 134: "Encouraged by Saudi Arabia, Safari Club members approached Somali president Siad Barre and offered to provide the arms he needed if he stopped taking Soviet aid. Barre agreed. Egypt then sold Somalia $75 million worth of its unwanted Soviet arms, with Saudi Arabia footing the bill.") (Note: Miglietta 2002, p. 78: "American military goods were provided by Egypt and Iran, which transferred excess arms from their inventories. It was said that American M-48 tanks sold to Iran were shipped to Somalia via Oman.") While declining to take a direct part in hostilities, the Soviet Union did provide the impetus for a successful Ethiopian counteroffensive to expel Somalia from the Ogaden. The counteroffensive was planned at the command level by Soviet advisers and bolstered by the delivery of millions of dollars' of sophisticated Soviet arms. About 11,000 Cuban troops spearheaded the primary effort, after receiving hasty training on the newly delivered Soviet weapons systems by East German instructors.

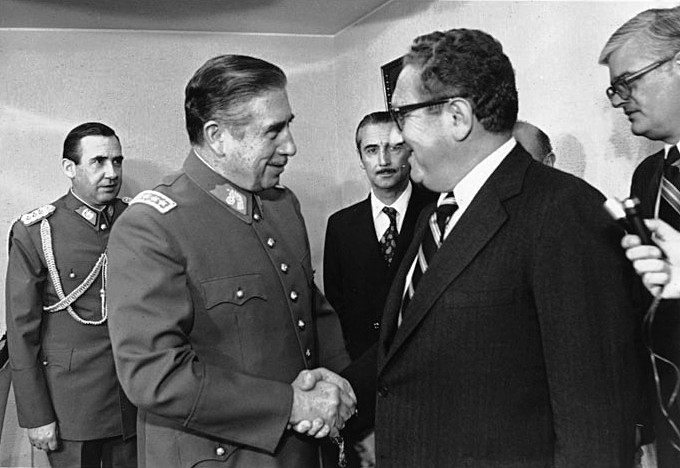
Chilean leader Augusto Pinochet shaking hands with Henry Kissinger in 1976

In Chile, the Socialist Party candidate Salvador Allende won the presidential election of 1970, thereby becoming the first democratically elected Marxist to become president of a country in the Americas. The CIA targeted Allende for removal and operated to undermine his support domestically, which contributed to unrest culminating in General Augusto Pinochet's 1973 Chilean coup d'état. Pinochet consolidated power as a military dictator, Allende's reforms of the economy were rolled back, and leftist opponents were killed or detained in internment camps under the Dirección de Inteligencia Nacional (DINA). Socialist states—with the exception of China and Romania—broke off relations with Chile. The Pinochet regime would go on to be one of the leading participants in Operation Condor, an international campaign of assassination and state terrorism organized by right-wing military dictatorships in the Southern Cone of South America that was covertly supported by the US government. (Note: McSherry 2011, p. 107: "Operation Condor also had the covert support of the US government. Washington provided Condor with military intelligence and training, financial assistance, advanced computers, sophisticated tracking technology, and access to the continental telecommunications system housed in the Panama Canal Zone.")

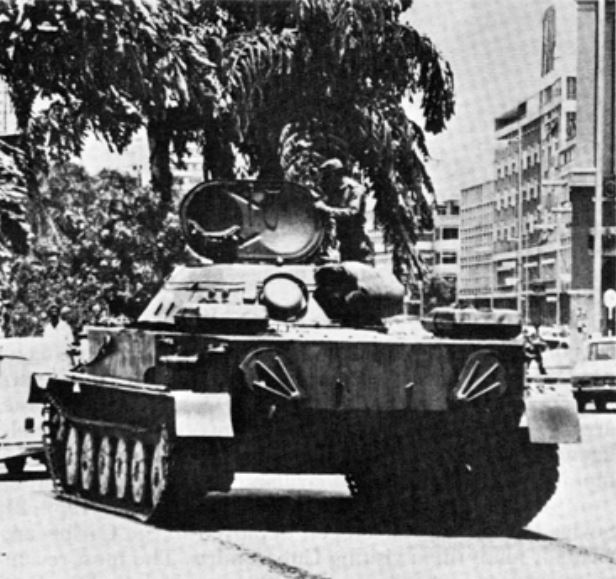
Cuban tank in the streets of Luanda, Angola, 1976

On 24 April 1974, the Carnation Revolution succeeded in ousting Marcelo Caetano and Portugal's right-wing Estado Novo government, sounding the death knell for the Portuguese Empire. Independence was hastily granted to several Portuguese colonies, including Angola, where the disintegration of colonial rule was followed by a civil war. There were three rival militant factions competing for power in Angola: the People's Movement for the Liberation of Angola (MPLA), the National Union for the Total Independence of Angola (UNITA), and the National Liberation Front of Angola (FNLA). While all three had socialist leanings, the MPLA was the only party with close ties to the Soviet Union. Its adherence to the concept of a Soviet one-party state alienated it from the FNLA and UNITA, which began portraying themselves as anti-communist and pro-Western. When the Soviets began supplying the MPLA with arms, the CIA and China offered substantial covert aid to the FNLA and UNITA. The MPLA eventually requested direct military support from Moscow in the form of ground troops, but the Soviets declined, offering to send advisers but no combat personnel. Cuba was more forthcoming and began amassing troops in Angola to assist the MPLA. By November 1975, there were over a thousand Cuban soldiers in the country. The persistent buildup of Cuban troops and Soviet weapons allowed the MPLA to secure victory and blunt an abortive intervention by Zairean and South African troops, which had deployed in a belated attempt to assist the FNLA and UNITA.

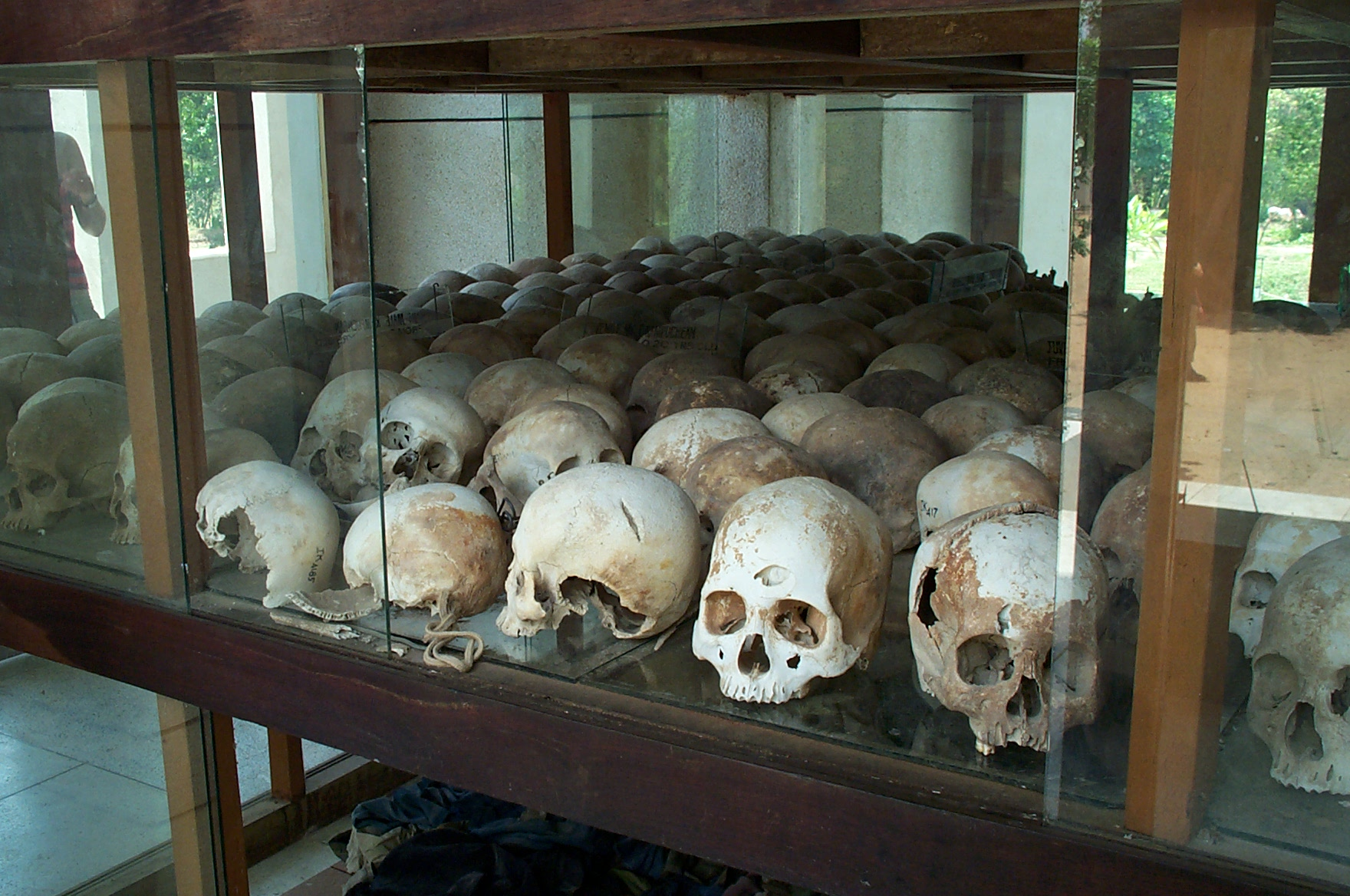
During the Khmer Rouge regime led by Pol Pot, 1.5 to 2 million people died due to the policies of his four-year premiership.

During the Vietnam War, North Vietnam used border areas of Cambodia as military bases, which Cambodian head of state Norodom Sihanouk tolerated in an attempt to preserve Cambodia's neutrality. Following Sihanouk's March 1970 deposition by pro-American general Lon Nol, who ordered the North Vietnamese to leave Cambodia, North Vietnam attempted to overrun Cambodia following negotiations with Nuon Chea, the second-in-command of the Cambodian communists (dubbed the Khmer Rouge) fighting to overthrow the Cambodian government. Sihanouk fled to China with the establishment of the GRUNK in Beijing. American and South Vietnamese forces responded to these actions with a bombing campaign and a ground incursion, which contributed to the violence of the civil war that soon enveloped all of Cambodia. US carpet bombing lasted until 1973, and while it prevented the Khmer Rouge from seizing the capital, it accelerated the collapse of rural society, increased social polarization, and killed tens of thousands.

After taking power and distancing himself from the Vietnamese, pro-China Khmer Rouge leader Pol Pot killed 1.5 to 2 million Cambodians in the Killing Fields, roughly a quarter of the population (commonly labelled the Cambodian genocide). (Note: Heuveline 2001, pp. 102–105: "As best as can now be estimated, over two million Cambodians died during the 1970s because of the political events of the decade, the vast majority of them during the mere four years of the 'Khmer Rouge' regime. This number of deaths is even more staggering when related to the size of the Cambodian population, then less than eight million. ... Subsequent reevaluations of the demographic data situated the death toll for the [civil war] in the order of 300,000 or less.") Martin Shaw described these atrocities as "the purest genocide of the Cold War era." Backed by the Kampuchean United Front for National Salvation, an organization of Khmer pro-Soviet Communists and Khmer Rouge defectors, Vietnam invaded Cambodia on 22 December 1978. The invasion succeeded in deposing Pol Pot, but the new state struggled to gain international recognition beyond the Soviet Bloc sphere. Despite the international outcry at Pol Pot regime's gross human rights violations, representatives of the Khmer Rouge were allowed to be seated in the UN General Assembly, with strong support from China, Western powers, and the member countries of ASEAN. Cambodia became bogged down in a guerrilla war led from refugee camps located on the border with Thailand. Following the destruction of the Khmer Rouge, the national reconstruction of Cambodia was hampered, and Vietnam suffered a punitive Chinese attack. Although unable to deter Vietnam from ousting Pol Pot, China demonstrated that its Cold War communist adversary, the Soviet Union, was unable to protect its Vietnamese ally. Former U.S. Secretary of State Henry Kissinger wrote that "China succeeded in exposing the limits of...[Soviet] strategic reach" and speculated that the desire to "compensate for their ineffectuality" contributed to the Soviets' decision to intervene in Afghanistan a year later.

== French withdrawal from NATO military structures ==
The unity of NATO was breached early in its history, with a crisis occurring during Charles de Gaulle's presidency of France. De Gaulle protested at the strong role of the United States in the organization and what he perceived as a special relationship between the United States and the United Kingdom. In a memorandum sent to President Dwight D. Eisenhower and Prime Minister Harold Macmillan on 17 September 1958, he argued for the creation of a tripartite directorate that would put France on an equal footing with the United States and the United Kingdom, and also for the expansion of NATO's coverage to include geographical areas of interest to France, most notably French Algeria, where France was waging a counter-insurgency and sought NATO assistance. De Gaulle considered the response he received to be unsatisfactory and began the development of an independent French nuclear deterrent. In 1966, he withdrew France from NATO's military structures and expelled NATO troops from French soil.

== Finlandization ==
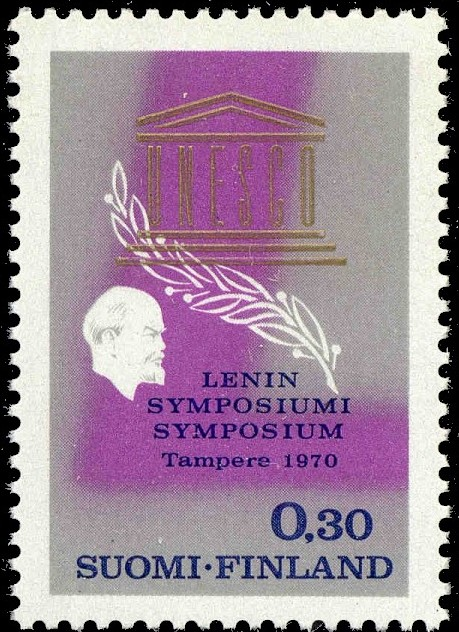
A manifestation of the Finlandization period: in April 1970, a Finnish stamp was issued in honor of the 100th anniversary of Vladimir Lenin's birth and the Lenin Symposium held in Tampere. The stamp was the first Finnish stamp issued about a foreign person.

Officially claiming to be neutral, Finland lay in the grey zone between the Western countries and the Soviet Union. The YYA Treaty (Finno-Soviet Pact of Friendship, Cooperation, and Mutual Assistance) gave the Soviet Union some leverage in Finnish domestic politics, which was later used as the term "Finlandization" by the West German press, meaning "to become like Finland". This meant, among other things, the Soviet adaptation spread to the editors of mass media, sparking strong forms of self-control, self-censorship (which included the banning of anti-Soviet books) and pro-Soviet attitudes. Most of the elite of media and politics shifted their attitudes to match the values that the Soviets were thought to favor and approve. Only after the ascent of Mikhail Gorbachev to Soviet leadership in 1985 did mass media in Finland gradually begin to criticise the Soviet Union more. When the Soviet Union allowed non-communist governments to take power in Eastern Europe, Gorbachev suggested they could look to Finland as an example to follow.

For West German conservative politicians, especially the Bavarian Prime Minister Franz Josef Strauss, the case of Finlandization served as a warning, for example, about how a great power dictates its much smaller neighbor in its internal affairs and the neighbor's independence becomes formal. During the Cold War, Finlandization was seen not only in Bavaria but also in Western intelligence services as a threat that completely free states had to be warned about in advance. To combat Finlandization, propaganda books and newspaper articles were published through CIA-funded research institutes and media companies, which denigrated Finnish neutrality policy and its pro-Soviet President Urho Kekkonen; this was one factor in making room for the East-West espionage on Finnish soil between the two great powers.

However, Finland maintained capitalism unlike most other countries bordering the Soviet Union. Even though being a neighbor to the Soviet Union sometimes resulted in overcautious concern in foreign policy, Finland developed closer co-operation with the other Nordic countries and declared itself even more neutral in superpower politics, although in the later years, support for capitalism was even more widespread.

== 1968 invasion of Czechoslovakia ==
A period of political liberalization took place in 1968 in Eastern Bloc country Czechoslovakia called the Prague Spring. The event was spurred by several events, including economic reforms that addressed an early 1960s economic downturn. In April, Czechoslovak leader Alexander Dubček launched an "Action Program" of liberalizations, which included increasing freedom of the press, freedom of speech and freedom of movement, along with an economic emphasis on consumer goods, the possibility of a multiparty government and limiting the power of the secret police. Initial reaction within the Eastern Bloc was mixed, with Hungary's János Kádár expressing support, while Soviet leader Leonid Brezhnev and others grew concerned about Dubček's reforms, which they feared might weaken the Eastern Bloc's position during the Cold War. On August 3, representatives from the Soviet Union, East Germany, Poland, Hungary, Bulgaria, and Czechoslovakia met in Bratislava and signed the Bratislava Declaration, which declaration affirmed unshakable fidelity to Marxism-Leninism and proletarian internationalism and declared an implacable struggle against "bourgeois" ideology and all "anti-socialist" forces.

On the night of August 20–21, 1968, Eastern Bloc armies from four Warsaw Pact countries – the Soviet Union, Bulgaria, Poland and Hungary – invaded Czechoslovakia. The invasion comported with the Brezhnev Doctrine, a policy of compelling Eastern Bloc states to subordinate national interests to those of the Bloc as a whole and the exercise of a Soviet right to intervene if an Eastern Bloc country appeared to shift towards capitalism. The invasion was followed by a wave of emigration, including an estimated 70,000 Czechs initially fleeing, with the total eventually reaching 300,000. In April 1969, Dubček was replaced as first secretary by Gustáv Husák, and a period of "normalization" began. Husák reversed Dubček's reforms, purged the party of liberal members, dismissed opponents from public office, reinstated the power of the police authorities, sought to re-centralize the economy and re-instated the disallowance of political commentary in mainstream media and by persons not considered to have "full political trust". The international image of the Soviet Union suffered considerably, especially among Western student movements inspired by the "New Left" and non-Aligned Movement states. Mao Zedong's People's Republic of China, for example, condemned both the Soviets and the Americans as imperialists.

== Brezhnev Doctrine ==
In September 1968, during a speech at the Fifth Congress of the Polish United Workers' Party one month after the invasion of Czechoslovakia, Brezhnev outlined the Brezhnev Doctrine, in which he claimed the right to violate the sovereignty of any country attempting to replace Marxism–Leninism with capitalism. During the speech, Brezhnev stated:

When forces that are hostile to socialism try to turn the development of some socialist country towards capitalism, it becomes not only a problem of the country concerned but a common problem and concern of all socialist countries.

The doctrine found its origins in the failures of Marxism–Leninism in states like Poland, Hungary and East Germany, which were facing a declining standard of living contrasting with the prosperity of West Germany and the rest of Western Europe.

== Vietnam War ==
U.S. President Lyndon B. Johnson landed 42,000 troops in the Dominican Republic in 1965 to prevent the emergence of "another Fidel Castro". More notable in 1965, however, was U.S. intervention in Southeast Asia. In 1965 Johnson stationed 22,000 troops in South Vietnam to prop up the faltering anticommunist regime. The South Vietnamese government had long been allied with the United States. The North Vietnamese under Ho Chi Minh were backed by the Soviet Union and China. North Vietnam, in turn, supported the National Liberation Front, which drew its ranks from the South Vietnamese working class and peasantry. Seeking to contain Communist expansion, Johnson increased the number of troops to 575,000 in 1968.

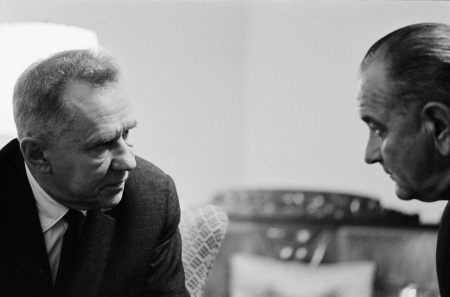
Soviet Premier Alexei Kosygin (left) with U.S. President Lyndon B. Johnson at the 1967 Glassboro Summit Conference

North Vietnam received Soviet approval for its war effort in 1959; the Soviet Union sent 15,000 military advisors and annual arms shipments worth $450 million to North Vietnam during the war, while China sent 320,000 troops and annual arms shipments worth $180 million.

While the early years of the war had significant U.S. casualties, the administration assured the public that the war was winnable and would in the near future result in a U.S. victory. The U.S. public's faith in "the light at the end of the tunnel" was shattered on January 30, 1968, when the NLF mounted the Tet Offensive in South Vietnam. Although neither of these offensives accomplished any military objectives, the surprising capacity of an enemy to even launch such an offensive convinced many in the U.S. that victory was impossible.

A vocal and growing peace movement centered on college campuses became a prominent feature as the counterculture of the 1960s adopted a vocal anti-war position. Especially unpopular was the draft that threatened to send young men to fight in the jungles of Southeast Asia.

Elected in 1968, U.S. President Richard M. Nixon began a policy of slow disengagement from the war. The goal was to gradually build up the South Vietnamese Army so that it could fight the war on its own. This policy became the cornerstone of the so-called "Nixon Doctrine". As applied to Vietnam, the doctrine was called "Vietnamization". The goal of Vietnamization was to enable the South Vietnamese army to increasingly hold its own against the NLF and the North Vietnamese Army.

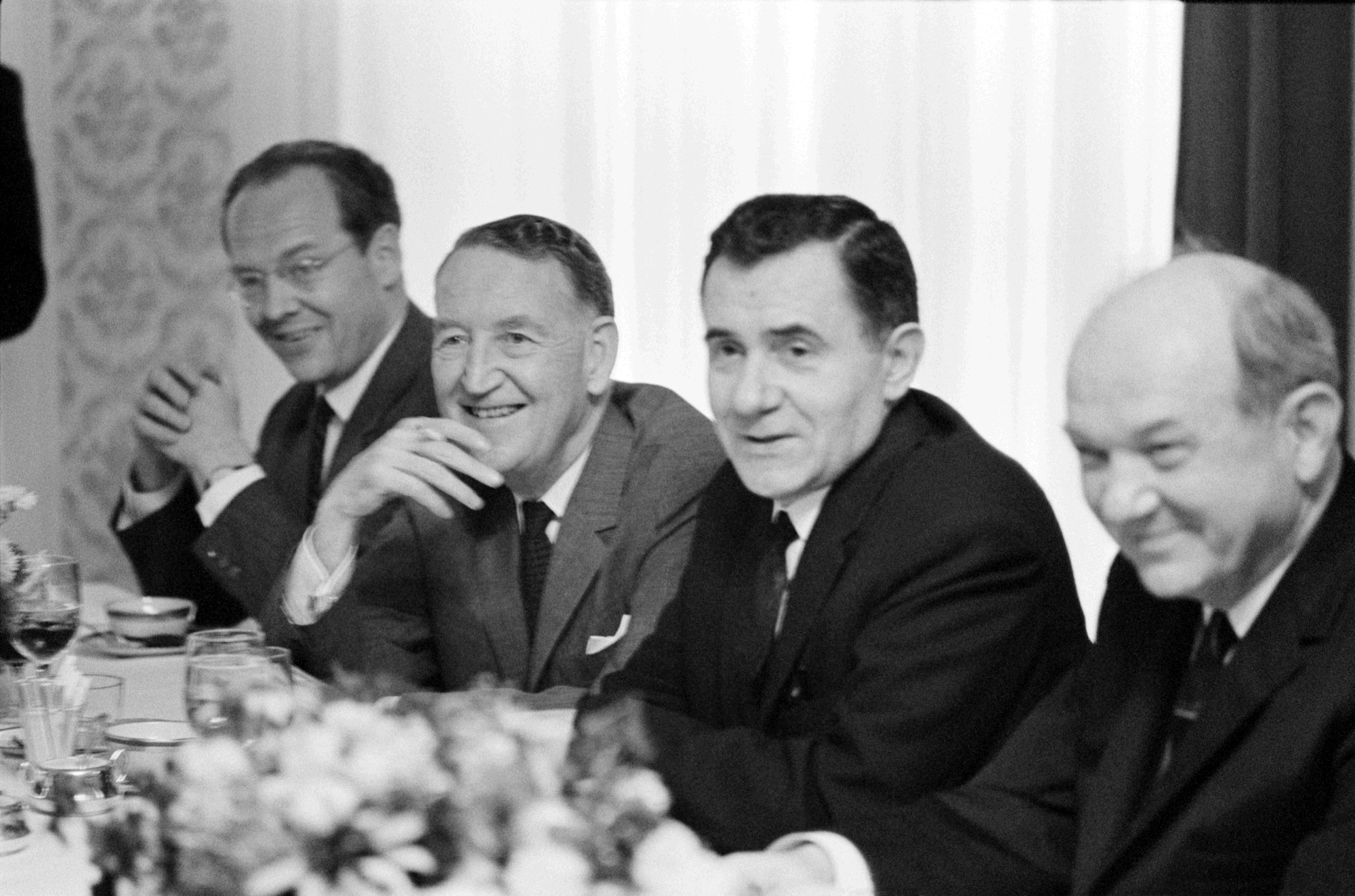
L-R: Llewellyn Thompson, Soviet Foreign Minister Andrei Gromyko, and Dean Rusk

On October 10, 1969, Nixon ordered a squadron of 18 B-52s loaded with nuclear weapons to race to the border of Soviet airspace in order to convince the Soviet Union that he was capable of anything to end the Vietnam War.

The morality of U.S. conduct of the war continued to be an issue under the Nixon presidency. In 1969, it came to light that Lt. William Calley, a platoon leader in Vietnam, had led a massacre of Vietnamese civilians a year earlier. In 1970, Nixon ordered secret military incursions into Cambodia in order to destroy NLF sanctuaries bordering on South Vietnam.

The U.S. pulled its troops out of Vietnam in 1973, and the conflict finally ended in 1975 when the North Vietnamese took Saigon, now Ho Chi Minh City. The war exacted a huge human cost in terms of fatalities (see Vietnam War casualties). 195,000–430,000 South Vietnamese civilians died in the war. 50,000–65,000 North Vietnamese civilians died in the war. The Army of the Republic of Vietnam lost between 171,331 and 220,357 men during the war. The official US Department of Defense figure was 950,765 communist forces killed in Vietnam from 1965 to 1974. Defense Department officials concluded that these body-count figures need to be deflated by 30 percent. In addition, Guenter Lewy assumes that one-third of the reported "enemy" killed may have been civilians, concluding that the actual number of deaths of communist military forces was probably closer to 444,000. Between 200,000 and 300,000 Cambodians, about 35,000 Laotians, and 58,220 U.S. service members also died in the conflict. (Note: The figures of 58,220 and 303,644 for U.S. deaths and wounded come from the Department of Defense Statistical Information Analysis Division (SIAD), Defense Manpower Data Center, as well as from a Department of Veterans fact sheet dated May 2010 the CRS (Congressional Research Service) Report for Congress, American War and Military Operations Casualties: Lists and Statistics, dated 26 February 2010, and the book Crucible Vietnam: Memoir of an Infantry Lieutenant. Some other sources give different figures (e.g. the 2005/2006 documentary Heart of Darkness: The Vietnam War Chronicles 1945–1975 cited elsewhere in this article gives a figure of 58,159 U.S. deaths, and the 2007 book Vietnam Sons gives a figure of 58,226))

== Nixon Doctrine ==
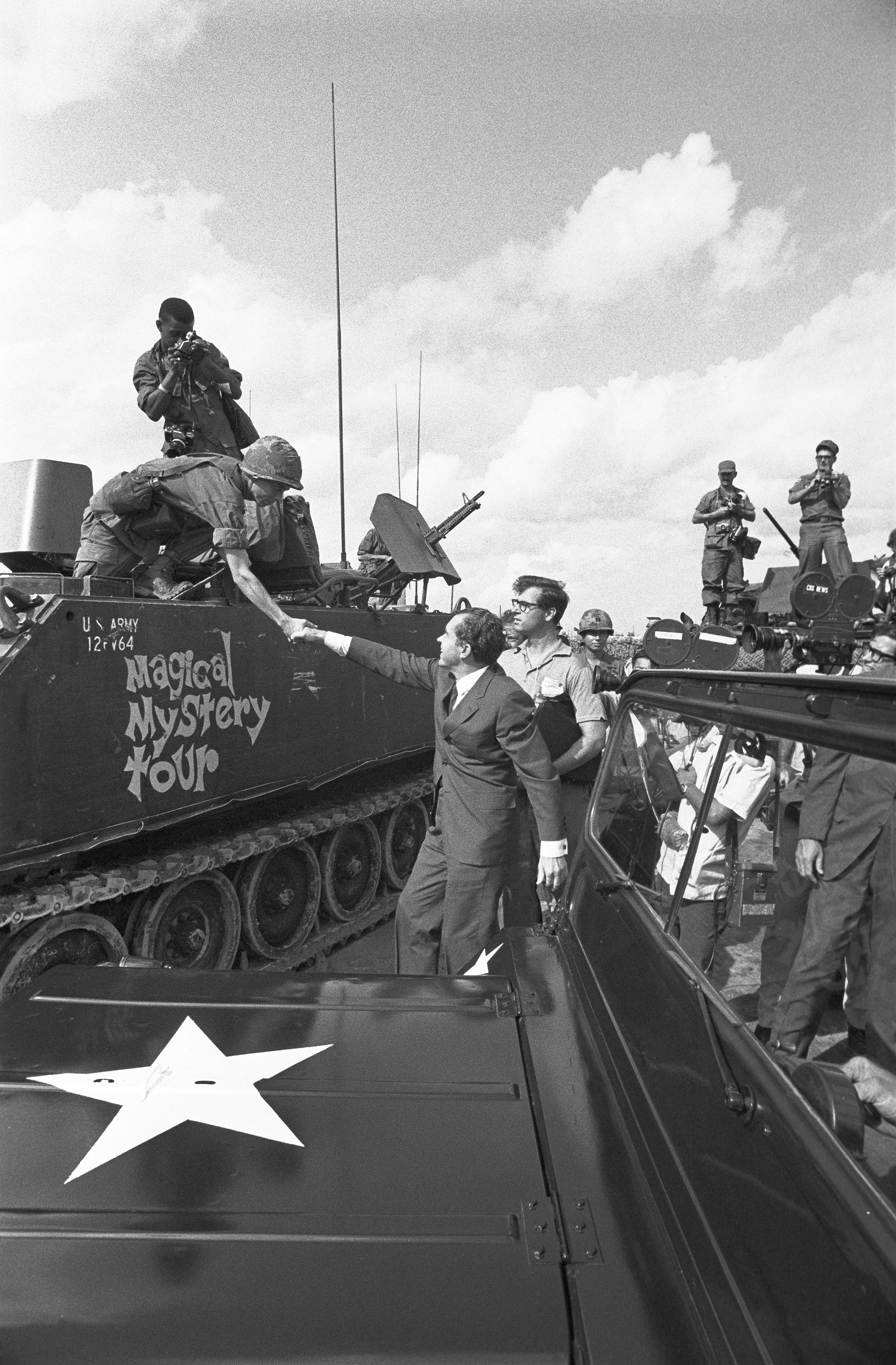
Richard Nixon shaking hands with armed forces in Vietnam (1969)

By the last years of the Nixon administration, it had become clear that it was the Third World that remained the most volatile and dangerous source of world instability. Central to the Nixon-Kissinger policy toward the Third World was the effort to maintain a stable status quo without involving the United States too deeply in local disputes. In 1969 and 1970, in response to the height of the Vietnam War, the President laid out the elements of what became known as the Nixon Doctrine, by which the United States would "participate in the defense and development of allies and friends" but would leave the "basic responsibility" for the future of those "friends" to the nations themselves. The Nixon Doctrine signified a growing contempt by the U.S. government for the United Nations, where underdeveloped nations were gaining influence through their sheer numbers, and increasing support to authoritarian regimes attempting to withstand popular challenges from within.

In the 1970s, for example, the CIA poured substantial funds into Chile to help support the established government against a Marxist challenge. When the Marxist candidate for president, Salvador Allende, came to power through free elections, the United States began funneling more money to opposition forces to help "destabilize" the new government. In 1973, a U.S.-backed military junta seized power from Allende. The new, repressive regime of General Augusto Pinochet received warm approval and increased military and economic assistance from the United States as an anti-Communist ally. Democracy was finally re-established in Chile in 1989.

== Sino–Soviet split ==
The People's Republic of China's Great Leap Forward and other policies based on agriculture instead of heavy industry challenged the Soviet-style socialism and the signs of the USSR's influence over the socialist countries. As "de-Stalinization" went forward in the Soviet Union, China's revolutionary founder, Mao Zedong, condemned the Soviets for "revisionism". The Chinese also were growing increasingly annoyed at being constantly in the number two role in the communist world. In the 1960s, an open split began to develop between the two powers; the tension lead to a series of border skirmishes along the Chinese-Soviet border.

The Sino-Soviet split had important ramifications in Southeast Asia. Despite having received substantial aid from China during their long wars, the Vietnamese communists aligned themselves with the Soviet Union against China. The Khmer Rouge had taken control of Cambodia in 1975 and became one of the most brutal regimes in world history. The newly unified Vietnam and the Khmer regime had poor relations from the outset as the Khmer Rouge began massacring ethnic Vietnamese in Cambodia, and then launched raiding parties into Vietnam. The Khmer Rouge allied itself with China, but this was not enough to prevent the Vietnamese from invading them and destroying the regime in 1979. While unable to save their Cambodian allies, the Chinese did respond to the Vietnamese by invading the north of Vietnam on a punitive expedition later in that year. After a few months of heavy fighting and casualties on both sides, the Chinese announced the operation was complete and withdrew, ending the fighting.

The United States tried to exacerbate the split by establishing diplomatic relations with China. The initiative began with President Nixon's visit to the country and culminated with the signing of the Joint Communiqué on the Establishment of Diplomatic Relations under President Carter.

== Détente and changing alliance ==
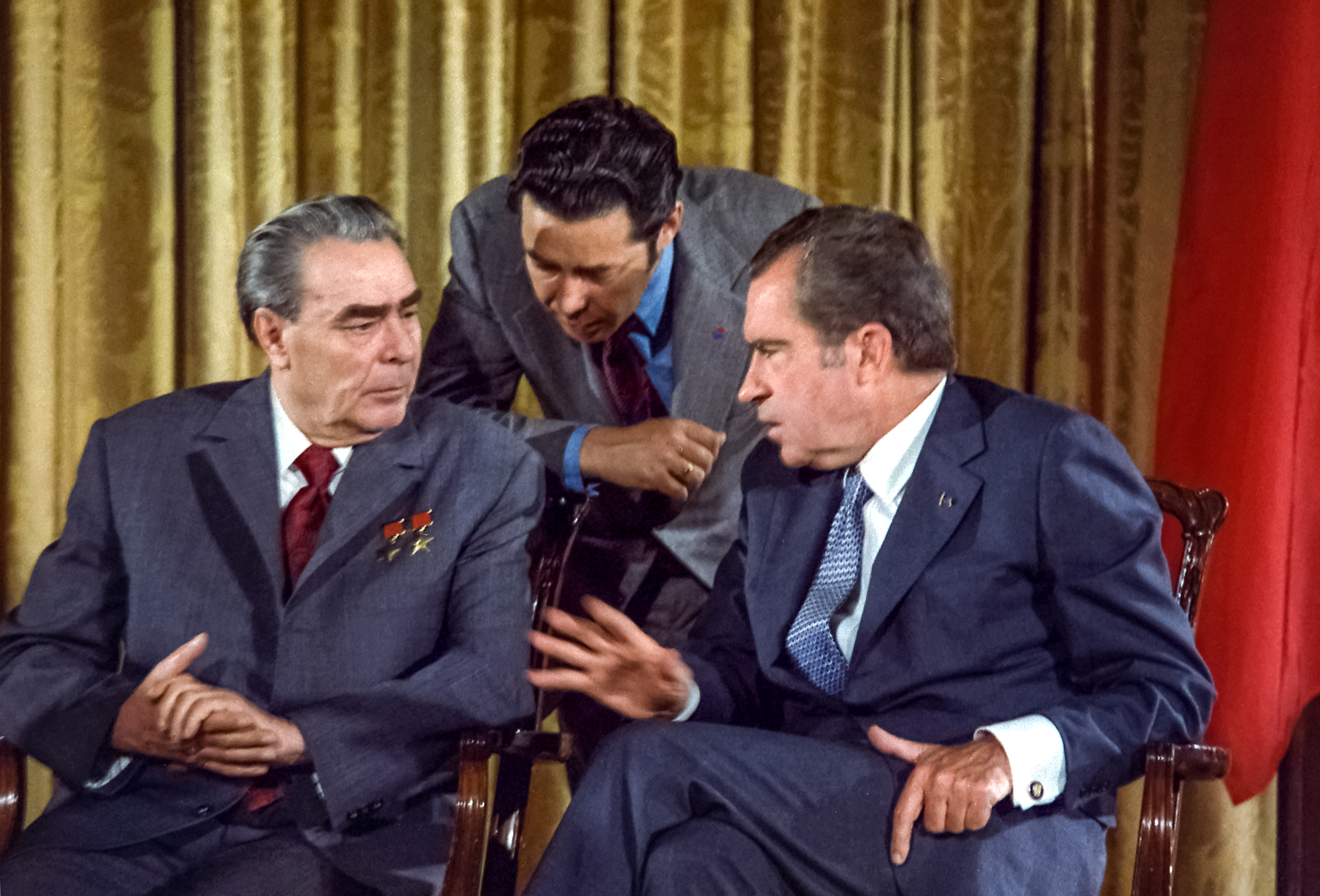
Brezhnev and Nixon talk during Brezhnev's 1973 visit to Washington – a high-water mark in détente between the United States and the Soviet Union.

In the course of the 1960s and 1970s, Cold War participants struggled to adjust to a new, more complicated pattern of international relations in which the world was no longer divided into two clearly opposed blocs. The Soviet Union achieved rough nuclear parity with the United States. From the beginning of the post-war period, Western Europe and Japan rapidly recovered from the destruction of World War II and sustained strong economic growth through the 1950s and 1960s, with per capita GDPs approaching those of the United States, while Eastern Bloc economies stagnated. China, Japan, and Western Europe; the increasing nationalism of the Third World, and the growing disunity within the communist alliance all augured a new multipolar international structure. Moreover, the 1973 world oil shock created a dramatic shift in the economic fortunes of the superpowers. The rapid increase in the price of oil devastated the U.S. economy leading to "stagflation" and slow growth.

Détente had both strategic and economic benefits for both sides of the Cold War, buoyed by their common interest in trying to check the further spread and proliferation of nuclear weapons. President Richard Nixon and Soviet leader Leonid Brezhnev signed the SALT I treaty to limit the development of strategic weapons. Arms control enabled both superpowers to slow the spiraling increases in their bloated defense budgets. At the same time, divided Europe began to pursue closer relations. The Ostpolitik of German chancellor Willy Brandt lead to the recognition of East Germany.

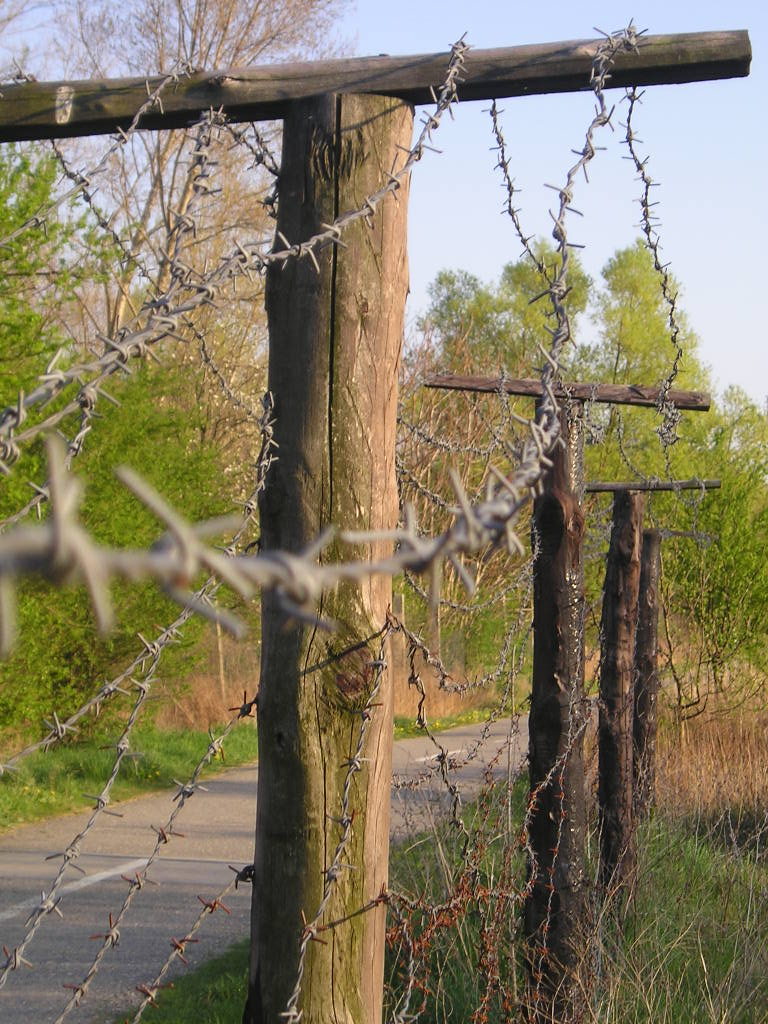
Remains of the "Iron Curtain" in Devínska Nová Ves, Bratislava (Slovakia) (2007)

Cooperation on the Helsinki Accords led to several agreements on politics, economics and human rights. A series of arms control agreements such as SALT I and the Anti-Ballistic Missile Treaty were created to limit the development of strategic weapons and slow the arms race.

Meanwhile, the Soviet Union concluded friendship and cooperation treaties with several states in the noncommunist world, especially among Third World and Non-Aligned Movement states.

During Détente, competition continued, especially in the Middle East and southern and eastern Africa. The two nations continued to compete with each other for influence in the resource-rich Third World. There was also increasing criticism of U.S. support for the Suharto regime in Indonesia, Augusto Pinochet's regime in Chile, and Mobuto Sese Seko's regime in Zaire.

The war in Vietnam and the Watergate crisis shattered confidence in the presidency. International frustrations, including the fall of South Vietnam in 1975, the hostage crisis in Iran from 1979-1981, the Soviet invasion of Afghanistan, the growth of international terrorism, and the acceleration of the arms race raised fears over the country's foreign policy. The energy crisis, unemployment, and inflation, derided as "stagflation", raised fundamental questions over the future of American prosperity.

At the same time, the oil-rich USSR benefited immensely, and the influx of oil wealth helped disguise the many systemic flaws in the Soviet economy. However, the entire Eastern Bloc continued to experience massive stagnation, consumer goods shortfalls in shortage economies, developmental stagnation and large housing quantity and quality shortfalls.

== Culture and media ==
The preoccupation of Cold War themes in popular culture continued during the 1960s and 1970s. One of the better-known films of the period was the 1964 black comedy Dr. Strangelove or: How I Learned to Stop Worrying and Love the Bomb directed by Stanley Kubrick and starring Peter Sellers. In the film, a mad United States general overrides the President's authority and orders a nuclear air strike on the Soviet Union. The film became a hit and today remains a classic.

In the United Kingdom, meanwhile, The War Game, a BBC television film written, directed, and produced by Peter Watkins was a Cold War piece of a darker nature. The film, depicting the impact of Soviet nuclear attack on England, caused dismay within both the BBC and in government. It was originally scheduled to air on August 6, 1966 (the anniversary of the Hiroshima attack) but was not transmitted until 1985.

In the 2011 superhero film, X-Men: First Class, the Cold War is portrayed to be controlled by a group of mutants that call themselves the Hell Fire Club.

In the summer of 1976, a mysterious and seemingly very powerful signal began infiltrating radio receivers around the globe. It has a signature 'knocking' sound when heard, and because the origin of this powerful signal was somewhere in the Soviet Union, the signal was given the nickname Russian Woodpecker. Many amateur radio listeners believed it to be part of the Soviet Unions over-the-horizon radar, however the Soviets denied they had anything to do with such signal. Between 1976 and 1989, the signal would come and go on many occasions and was most prominent on the shortwave radio bands. It was not until the end of the Cold War that the Russians admitted these radar pings were indeed that of Duga, an advanced over-the-horizon radar system.

The 2004 video game Metal Gear Solid 3: Snake Eater is set in 1964 and deals heavily with the themes of nuclear deterrence, covert operations, and the Cold War. The 2010 video game Call of Duty: Black Ops is set during this period of the Cold War.

== Significant documents ==
- Partial or Limited Test Ban Treaty (PTBT/LTBT): 1963. Also put forth by Kennedy; banned nuclear tests in the atmosphere, underwater and in space. However, neither France nor China (both Nuclear Weapon States) signed.
- Nuclear Non-Proliferation Treaty (NPT): 1968. Countries already possessing nuclear weapons before are defined as "Nuclear-Weapon States". Non-Nuclear Weapon states were prohibited from (among other things) possessing, manufacturing, or acquiring nuclear weapons or other nuclear explosive devices. All 187 signatories were committed to the goal of (eventual) nuclear disarmament.
- Anti-Ballistic Missile Treaty (ABM): 1972. Entered into between the U.S. and USSR to limit the anti-ballistic missile (ABM) systems used in defending areas against missile-delivered nuclear weapons; ended by the U.S. in 2002.
- Strategic Arms Limitation Treaties I & II (SALT I & II): 1972 / 1979. Limited the growth of U.S. and Soviet missile arsenals.
- Prevention of Nuclear War Agreement: 1973. Committed the U.S. and USSR to consult with one another during conditions of nuclear confrontation.

== See also ==
- History of the Soviet Union (1953–1964)
- History of the Soviet Union (1964–1982)
- History of the United States (1964–1980)
- Indonesian killings of 1965–1966
- Timeline of Events in the Cold War
- Détente
- Operation Neptune (Espionage)
- Re-education camp (Vietnam)
- Vietnamese boat people
