= Lawrence Martin =

Lawrence Martin may refer to:

- Lawrence Martin (journalist) (born 1948), Canadian journalist
- Lawrence Martin (musician) (born 1956), Canadian musician and mayor
- Lawrence Martin-Bittman, formerly Ladislav Bittman, see Operation Neptune
- Lawrence Martin (geographer) (1880–1955), professor of physiography and geography

== See also ==
- Laurence Martin (born 1928), former Vice-Chancellor of Newcastle University
- Larry Martin (1943–2013), paleontologist and curator
- Larry A. Martin (born 1957), Republican member of the South Carolina Senate
- Larry Martyn (1934–1994), English actor
- Martin Lawrence (disambiguation)
