= Media Technology and Society =

1998 book by Brian Winston

Media Technology and Society: A History from the Telegraph to the Internet
- Author: Brian Winston
- Language: English
- Genre: Non-fiction
- Publication date: 1998

Media Technology and Society: A History from the Telegraph to the Internet is a 1998 book by Brian Winston. The book's central thesis is that technology, rather than developing in relatively discontinuous revolutions, evolves as part of a larger evolutionary pattern. It was named 'Best Book of 1998' by the American Association for History and Computing.

== Content ==
The book contains examples of ways in which technology, human behaviour and society are interconnected. Through historical accounts, Winston demonstrates how technology reinforces social trends, and how social conditions lead to specific inventions. It was written for the general public.
