= Margaret Stacey =

British sociologist (1922–2004)

Professor Margaret "Meg" Stacey (27 March 1922 – 10 February 2004) was a British sociologist and a leading figure in the establishment of Sociology as an academic discipline.

== Early life and education ==
She was born Margaret Petrie, in London on 27 March 1922. Her mother was a teacher and her father was a manufacturer and printer.

She studied at the City of London School for Girls. She graduated from the London School of Economics in 1943 with a first class honours degree in sociology.

== Career ==
She was a leading figure in establishing sociology as an academic discipline, helping shape British empirical sociology. She was one of the creators of medical sociology as a distinct academic field. She was a key contributor to the reconceptualisation of medicine as a healing system in a wider societal context, rather than simply concerned with the interactions in the clinic; a 'sociology of health and healing', rather than 'medical sociology'. Her work in the sociology of health and healing has influenced policy and medical education.

After graduating from LSE in 1943, she worked in a war factory in Scotland. At this time, she campaigned against the imprisonment of immigrants from enemy nations, influenced by her encounters with her fellow student at LSE, Claus Moser. She left this job after a year, to work as an extramural lecturer in Oxford.

After ten years without a secure position in a university, during which time she nevertheless continued to work, she started working at Swansea University in 1961, and was appointed a lecturer in 1963. In the 1960s, Stacey led the influential research project Children in Hospital, funded by the Ministry of Health. At the time, when a child was admitted to hospital, the sole objective was to treat the illness, leading some children to be separated from their families, friends and schools for many months and ignoring the wider wellbeing of the child.

She moved to the University of Warwick in 1974; the first woman to be appointed to a professorship at the university. She held this role until her retirement in 1989. During this time, she published 14 books, and served as chair of the sociology department and the graduate school of Women's Studies.

Her first book, Tradition and Change (1960), was the first British study of social change to have a follow-up study. It examined social change in Banbury, Oxfordshire in the 1940s, and was pioneering for its use of team research.

From 1968 to 1970 Stacey served as Secretary of the British Sociological Association. She was elected President of the British Sociological Association in 1982, and her presidential address criticised the male-dominated field and its influence on the primarily male subjects of study. She was appointed to the Welsh Hospital Board in 1970, and she was a member-observer of the General Medical Council from 1973 to 1983.

In 1999 a conference was convened in her honour, hosted at the University of Warwick. In the same year, she travelled to Montenegro to work with Women in Black, a women's anti-war movement.

She was a feminist and actively worked to improve gender balance in academia, often mentoring and supporting younger women colleagues.

== Personal life ==
She was widely known as Meg, retaining the name Margaret for professional purposes.

She married political scientist Frank Stacey in 1945, and the couple had four children and a foster child. Stacey completed her husband's book, Ombudsmen Compared, which was unfinished when he died in 1977.

She lived with her partner Jennifer Lorch for many years. Stacey enjoyed gardening, and in later life became interested in Buddhism. She died in Warwick on 10 February 2004.

Academic offices
Preceded by John Eldridge	President of the British Sociological Association; 1981–1983	Succeeded by Richard Brown (sociologist)
