= John Eldridge (sociologist) =

British sociologist (1936–2022)

John Eric Thomas Eldridge (17 May 1936 – 24 December 2022) was a British sociologist known for his writings on Industrial Sociology and on Max Weber as well as for being a founding member of the media analysis research group the Glasgow Media Group. Eldridge was a professor emeritus at the University of Glasgow and a visiting professor of sociology at the University of Strathclyde He was President of the British Sociological Association from 1979 to 1981.

Eldridge was born in Southampton on 17 May 1936 to Hetty (née Bartlett) and Edo (Thomas) Eldridge. He was their only child. As a child he lived through the blitz on the city during the Second World War. He attended Taunton's School, Southampton and became the English junior chess champion as a schoolboy. He gained a BSc (Econ) from the University of London at the then University College, Leicester and an MA from Leicester University. He married Rosemary North in 1960; after she died in 1997, he married Christine Reid in 2006. He was a long-serving Methodist local preacher. Eldridge died on 24 December 2022, at the age of 86.

== Positions held ==
- Lecturer and Senior Lecturer, University of York (1964–1969),
- Professor, University of Bradford (1969–1972),
- Professor, University of Glasgow (1972–2022).

== Publications ==
Books include:

- Bad News (Routledge, 1976)
- Recent British Sociology (Red Globe, 1981)
- C. Wright Mills (Tavistock, 1985)
- (with J.MacInnes and P. Cressey), Industrial Sociology and Economic Crisis (Harvester Wheatsheaf, 1990)
- Getting the Message: News, Truth and Power (Routledge, 1993)
- (with L Eldridge) Raymond Williams, (Routledge, 1994)
- 978-0-415-12729-5 The Glasgow University Media Group Reader: News Content, Language and Visuals (ed) (Routledge, 1995) ISBN 978-0-415-12729-5
- (with J.Kitzinger and K.Williams) The Mass Media and Power in Modern Britain (Oxford University Press,1997)

== Notes ==
Academic offices
Preceded by Keith Kelsall	President of the British Sociological Association; 1979 – 1981	Succeeded by Margaret Stacey
