= Glasgow Media Group =

UK Media Research Center that pioneered some of the first studies of media bias

The Glasgow Media Group (also referred to as the Glasgow University Media Group, the GUMG, and the Glasgow Media Unit), is a group of researchers formed at the University of Glasgow in 1974, which pioneered the analysis of television news in a series of studies. Operating under the GUMG banner, academics including its founders Brian Winston, Greg Philo and John Eldridge have consistently postulated that television news is biased in favour of powerful forces such as governments, transnational corporations and the rich over issues like climate change, conflicts such as Israel/Palestine, Northern Ireland, welfare benefits, economics and refugees.

== Impact ==
In 1982, Really Bad News, the sequel to the Group's earlier books Bad News and More Bad News, reached number five on the Glasgow Evening Times best sellers list and other GUMG titles have remained popular on social science courses at universities.

In 1985, BBC Two made an eponymous programme based on War and Peace News as part of their Open Space series but before broadcast it removed certain aspects of the programme, including minutes leaked from their own editorial meetings. As a result, the GUMG secured a screen-card reading CENSORED and another suggesting that viewers write and complain to the BBC's Director General. The resulting publicity led to the editor of ITN, David Nicholas, attacking the book and to The Observer describing the GUMG as 'academic hit men stalking television's newscasters'.

In 2011, Emma Briant, Greg Philo and Nick Watson from the Strathclyde Centre for Disability Research published Bad News for Disabled People, which was discussed in the UK and Scottish parliaments and used in evidence in the Leveson Inquiry into the British Press. On 14 November 2011, the report was directly cited by Dame Tanni Grey-Thompson in a welfare reform debate in the UK House of Lords as evidence of widespread misrepresentation of disabled people and disability benefits. Also in November 2011, the Shadow Minister for Disability Issues Kate Green MP referred directly to the findings in a UK House of Commons debate on disability hate crime.

In 2012, Catherine Happer and Greg Philo published a collaborative research report with Antony Froggatt of Chatham House examining public beliefs and behaviours on climate change and energy security. They found "widespread confusion" due to media representations and politicization of the issue had resulted in falling media coverage, leading to a lack of trust of political voices on the subject and lack of recognition among the public of the issue's importance.

In 2013, Greg Philo, Emma Briant and Pauline Donald's book Bad News for Refugees, a first study of the emerging refugee crisis in the UK media prior to Brexit, was included in a Scottish Refugee Council submission to Home Affairs Select Committee Inquiry into Asylum & Media.

Chatham House and Glasgow University Media Group, in a 2015 report titled "Changing Climate, Changing Diets: Pathways to Lower Meat Consumption" also were the first to call for a tax on red meat, known as the Meat Tax.

== Members ==
The Glasgow University Media Group is composed of scholars and specialists in the area of communications, many of whom worked originally in the Glasgow University Media Unit whose Research Director was Greg Philo and many who have now retired or moved on. Past and present members who have published with the group include:

- John Eldridge (Founder, retired Affiliate Research Fellow)
- Brian Winston (Founder, now University of Lincoln)
- Greg Philo (Founder, Director of the Glasgow Media Group)
- Catherine Happer (Director of the Glasgow University Media Group 2022- )
- David Miller (now University of Bristol)
- Mike Berry (now Cardiff University)
- Emma Briant (now Monash University)
- Rena Bivens (now Carleton University)
- Lesley Henderson
- Giuliana Tiripelli
- Jen Burke
- Hayes Mabweazara
- Dominic Hinde

== Publications ==
- Bad News, Routledge and Kegan Paul, 1976.
- More Bad News Routledge and Kegan Paul, 1980.
- Really Bad News, Writers and Readers, 1982.
- Greg Philo Seeing and Believing, Routledge, 1990
- John Eldridge (Ed.) Getting the Message: News, Truth and Power (Routledge, 1993)
- John Eldridge (Ed.) News Content, Language and Visuals: Glasgow University Media Reader (Communication and Society) (Paperback), Routledge, 1995.
- Greg Philo (Ed.) Industry, Economy, War and Politics: Glasgow University Media Reader: 2 (Communication and Society), Routledge, 1995.
- John Eldridge, J. Kitzinger and K. Williams) The Mass Media and Power in Modern Britain (Oxford University Press,1997)
- David Miller, Jenny Kitzinger, Peter Beharrel and Kevin Williams The Circuit of Mass Communication: Media Strategies, Representation and Audience Reception in the AIDS Crisis, Sage, 1998.
- Greg Philo Message Received, Longman, 1999.
- Greg Philo and David Miller Market Killing: What the free market does and what social scientists can do about it, Longman, 2000.
- Reporting Child Deaths by Glasgow Media Group (National Society for the Prevention of Cruelty to Children (NSPCC), 1 February 2001) Paperback
- Greg Philo and Mike Berry Bad News From Israel, Pluto, 2004.
- Greg Philo and Mike Berry More Bad News from Israel, Pluto 2011
- Emma Briant, Greg Philo & Nick Watson Bad News for Disabled People: How the Newspapers are Reporting Disability, Strathclyde Centre for Disability Research and Glasgow Media Unit, University of Glasgow, 2011
- Greg Philo, Emma Briant and Pauline Donald; Bad News for Refugees, Pluto, 2013.
- Laura Wellesley, Catherine Happer, Antony Froggatt, Greg Philo, Changing Climate, Changing Diets: Pathways to Lower Meat Consumption, Chatham House, London, 2015
- Alan MacLeod; Bad News From Venezuela: Twenty Years of Fake News and Misreporting, Routledge, 2018.
- Greg Philo, Mike Berry, Justin Schlosberg, Antony Lerman, David Miller, Bad News For Labour: Antisemitism, the Party and Public Belief, , Pluto Press, 2019.
- Catherine Happer, Philip Schlesinger, Ana Langer, Hayes Mabweazara, Dominic Hinde, 'Scotland's Sustainable Media Future: Challenges and Opportunities: a Stakeholder Analysis', University of Glasgow, 2022.
