= Greg Philo =

English sociologist (1947–2024)

- Born: 30 June 1947; Bexleyheath, Kent, England
- Died: 23 May 2024 (aged 76)
- Known for: The Glasgow Media Group
- Spouse: May Menzies (m.1984 div. 2010) Yajun Deng (m. 2021)
- Children: 4

Academic background
- Education: University of Bradford (Bachelor's); University of Glasgow (PhD)
- Thesis: News Content and Audience Belief: A Case Study of the 1984/5 Miners Strike (1989)

Greg Philo (30 June 1947 - 23 May 2024) was an English sociologist, communications researcher, activist and author who was the Professor of Communications and Social Change in Sociology at The University of Glasgow and director and founding member of the Glasgow Media Group (GUMG).

== Early life and education ==
Philo was born in Bexleyheath to Irene (née Campbell) who was a telephone operator and Thomas Philo a shipyard manager. He attended St Mary's Roman Catholic grammar school in Sidcup. Philo then went on to study sociology at Bradford University. There he co-founded the General Will theatre group. He went to study at the University of Glasgow. In 1980 he became the GUMG research director and in 1990 was appointed professor and stayed there until his retirement in 2021.

== Career ==
The original goal of the GUMG project was to "record and analyse the daily news bulletins across the three main channels, empirically demonstrating the extent of bias and distortion in the reporting of economic and industrial news." Philo later became the leading spokesperson for the group in 1990 and started to develop the groups content analysis methods, further assisting in the sociological media research of subjects such as: The Falklands War and Media Power in The UK.

After the group received funding from the Social Science Research Council (UK), the group started analysing TV news reporting using new video recording technology. The research was published as Bad News which stated that TV in the UK was not politically neutral, but rather reflected powerful groups in society. The book was badly received by large news organisations such as The BBC, with many groups condemning it as a purely Marxist work. This was later overturned though with the BBC's John Wilson stating "it was necessary to be honest and admit that there was something in what the GUMG was saying" at which point the BBC attempted to institute some changes that came from the study.

In 2010, Philo proposed a wealth tax based on a poll of UK population which showed "very strong support, with 74% of the population approving" of the proposal to address inequality, making the case in The Guardian.

== Books ==
=== Authored ===
- Philo, Greg; McLaughlin, Greg (1993). The British Media and the Gulf War. Glasgow University Media Group. ISBN 978-0-952-16691-7.
- Philo, Greg; Berry, Mike (2004). Bad News from Israel. London Sterling, Va: Pluto Press. ISBN 978-0-7453-2062-5.
- Philo, Greg; Berry, Mike (2011). More Bad News from Israel. London: Pluto Press. ISBN 978-0-7453-2978-9.
- Philo, Greg; Happer, Catherine (2013). Communicating Climate Change and Energy Security: New Methods in Understanding Audiences. Routledge New Developments in Communication and Society Research. Hoboken: Taylor and Francis. ISBN 978-1-135-04811-2.
- Philo, Greg; Briant, Emma; Donald, Pauline (2013). Bad News for Refugees. London: PlutoPress. ISBN 978-0-7453-3433-2. OCLC 854617193.
- Philo, Greg (2014). Seeing and Believing: The Influence of Television. Taylor & Francis. ISBN 978-1-134-95925-9.
- Philo, Greg; Berry, Mike; Schlosberg, Justin; Lerman, Antony; Miller, David (2019). Bad News for Labour: Antisemitism, the Party and Public Belief. London: Pluto Press. ISBN 978-0-7453-4065-4. OCLC 1099567466.

=== Edited ===
- Beharrell, Peter, ed. (1977). Trade Unions and the Media. Greg Philo. London: Palgrave Macmillan UK. ISBN 978-1-349-03424-6.
- Philo, Greg, ed. (2014). Message Received. Taylor & Francis. ISBN 978-1-317-88588-7.
