= Černé jezero =

Lake in the Czech Republic

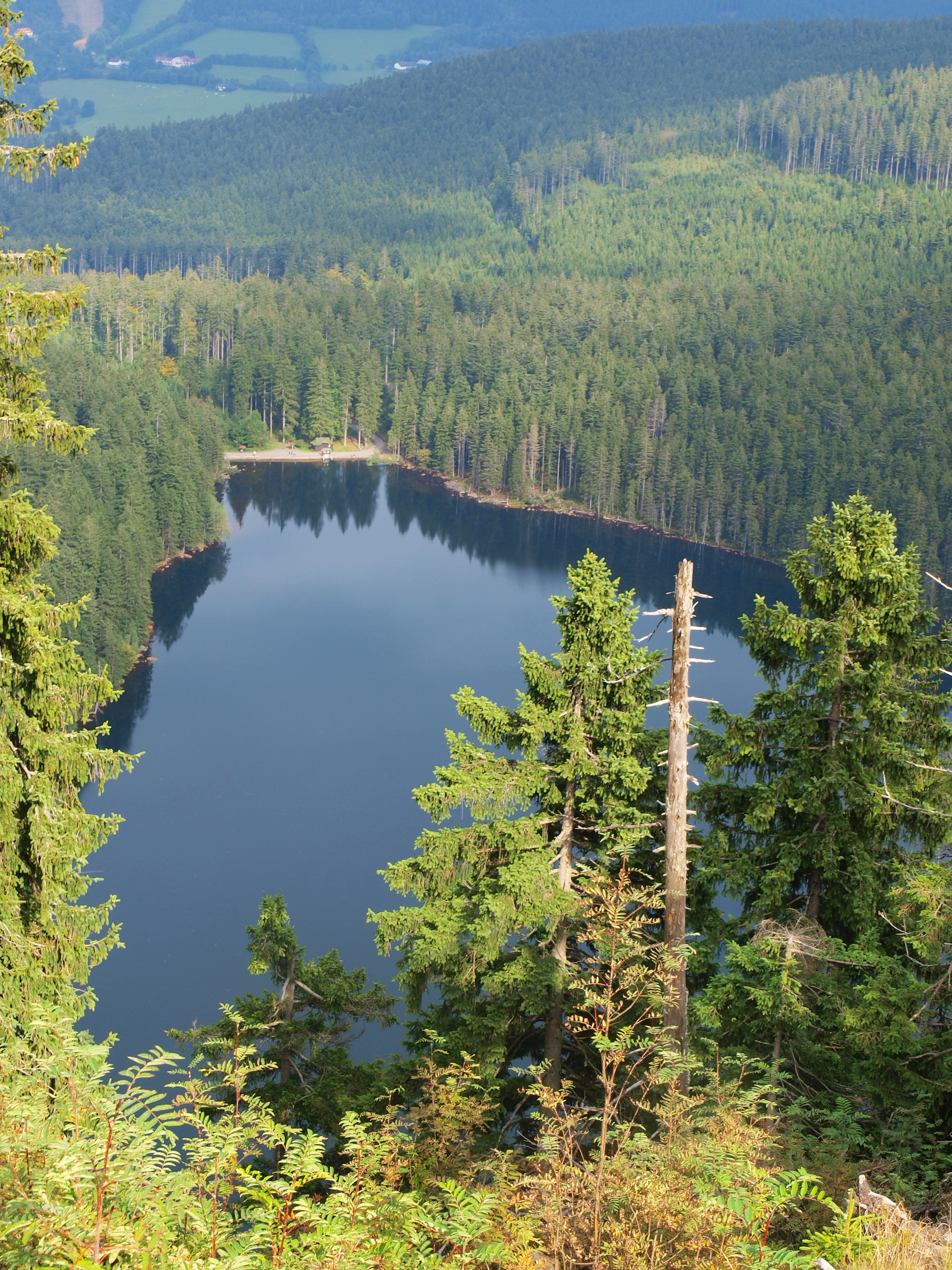

- Location within Czech Republic
- Location: near Železná Ruda, Czech Republic
- Coordinates: 49°10′45″N 13°10′57″E
- Type: glacial
- Primary outflows: Černý potok
- Catchment area: 1.28 km^{2} (0.49 sq mi)
- Basin countries: Czech Republic
- Max. length: ~530 m (1,740 ft)
- Max. width: ~350 m (1,150 ft)
- Surface area: 18.4 ha (45 acres)
- Average depth: 15 m (49 ft)
- Max. depth: 40.6 m (133 ft)
- Water volume: 2.878×10^{6} m^{3} (2,333 acre⋅ft)
- Shore length^{1}: ~1,300 m (4,300 ft)
- Surface elevation: 1,008 m (3,307 ft)
- ^{1} Shore length is not a well-defined measure.

Černé jezero (German: Schwarzer See, meaning "Black Lake") in the Bohemian Forest is the largest and deepest natural lake in the Czech Republic.

This triangular lake surrounded with spruce forest is located about 6 km northwest of Železná Ruda under a 300-metre-high cliff on Jezerní hora (1,343 m). It is of glacial origin, a product of the Würm glaciation. The water in the lake is oligotrophic. There is a natural outflow through Černý potok, a short stream which is a tributary of the Úhlava River. The main European water divide runs across the mountain just above the lake. As a consequence, Černé jezero belongs to the water basin of the Elbe, which finds the North Sea, while Čertovo jezero just 2 km away drains into the Danube and thence the Black Sea.

The oldest pumped-storage hydroelectric plant in the Czech Republic (built 1929-1930) is located here; the lake serves as its upper reservoir.

== Role in Cold War Czech disinformation campaign ==
Due to proximity of the German border (about 1 km), access to the lake was very limited during the Iron Curtain era. This was exploited by communist secret services in Operation Neptune (1964) when the Czechoslovak StB in collaboration with the Soviet KGB covertly sank cases containing old captured Nazi SS RSHA documents in the lake and subsequently "accidentally discovered" them there. This came to light in The Deception Game, published in 1972 by Ladislav Bittmann.
