= Emma Briant =

British social scientist and academic

- Occupations: Academic; lecturer; writer; author

Academic background
- Education: Coventry University; Glasgow Caledonian University; Open University; University of Glasgow
- Alma mater: University of Glasgow
- Thesis: "'Special Relationships' and the Negotiation of the Propaganda 'War on Terror'" (2011)
- Doctoral advisor: Greg Philo, Sarah Oates

Academic work
- Discipline: Propaganda studies, political science, political journalism, disinformation, surveillance
- Institutions: University of Glasgow; University of Sheffield; University of Essex; George Washington University; Bard College; American University; Monash University
- Main interests: Propaganda, surveillance, information warfare, human rights, security
- Website: emma-briant.co.uk

Emma L. Briant is a British scholar and academic researcher on media, contemporary propaganda, surveillance and information warfare who was involved in exposing the Facebook–Cambridge Analytica data scandal concerning data misuse and disinformation. She became associate professor of news and political communication at Monash University in Melbourne, Australia, in 2023. Before this she was an associate researcher at Bard College and taught in the School of Communication at American University. Briant became an honorary associate at Cambridge University's Centre for Financial Reporting & Accountability, headed by Alan Jagolinzer, and joined Central European University as a fellow of the Centre for Media, Data and Society in 2022.

== Education ==
Briant graduated from Coventry University in 2003, before completing two master's degrees at Glasgow Caledonian University and the University of Glasgow where she then was part of Glasgow Media Group. She achieved a doctorate from the University of Glasgow in sociology in 2011. Briant's doctoral thesis examined the development of military and intelligence propaganda in the US and UK during the "war on terror" as militaries adapted to changing technology.

== Media, political propaganda and human rights ==
While at Glasgow Media Group, Briant co-authored the study Bad News for Disabled People with Greg Philo and Nick Watson. Bad News for Disabled People examined how disability was represented in the UK media. The study showed the detrimental impact this had on public perceptions of disabled people as 'frauds' and real world impacts on their lives. She then authored her first book, Bad News for Refugees, with Greg Philo and Pauline Donald, which examined false and misleading media narratives of migration and refugees as well as their impacts on migrants and their communities in the build up to the European refugee crisis. She continued to research media bias and disinformation on human rights issues, and in particular false representation of asylum and refugees in the UK media and political rhetoric and disinformation in the lead up to Brexit. She submitted her research to inquiries and published research on the role of Cambridge Analytica and Leave.EU in the 2016 British Brexit Referendum. Her research on these subjects was mentioned on the BBC, The Times of London, and The Observer.

== Propaganda, international security and changing technology ==
In 2015, while lecturer in journalism studies at University of Sheffield, Briant published her second book, Propaganda and Counter-Terrorism: Strategies for Global Change, based on her doctoral thesis. The book examines British and United States governments' attempts to adapt their propaganda strategies to global terrorist threats in a rapidly changing media environment. It discusses Anglo-American coordination and domestic struggles that brought in far-reaching changes to propaganda, largely in isolation from public debate. She continues to publish both on language and definitions of propaganda; strategy and tactics in influence operations; ethics of data use and surveillance in the context of political campaigns, international security and conflicts. In addition to several scholarly articles and policy reports, Briant has also written op-eds and journalistic articles for outlets including the Organized Crime and Corruption Reporting Project, Open Democracy, The Conversation, the Ottawa Citizen and Guardian.

Briant sits on the advisory board of campaign group Clean up the Internet.

Briant is co-founder of Women in Disinformation, a network of women researchers.

Briant began running a YouTube show in 2021 called Afternoon Tea and Truth Biscuits.

== Facebook–Cambridge Analytica data scandal ==
In 2018, while she was a senior lecturer at the University of Essex, Briant was involved in revealing the Facebook–Cambridge Analytica data scandal, a global disinformation and data scandal involving Facebook, the campaign firm Cambridge Analytica, that worked for Donald Trump and on the Brexit campaigns, and its defence contractor parent firm SCL Group. Briant had spent years researching and interviewing the parent firm SCL Group as part of her research for her book Propaganda and Counter-terrorism and had then begun researching how their methodology had been used in political campaigns including by subsidiary firm Cambridge Analytica. Briant was requested to give testimony and evidence regarding the firms' data misuse and disinformation to multiple inquiries including the UK Parliament Digital Culture Media and Sport Select Committee's Inquiry into Fake News and the US Senate Judiciary Committee. She contributed to the 2019 Oscar-shortlisted film on Facebook and Cambridge Analytica in the 2016 United States elections, The Great Hack. Briant also reported in Byline Times. In 2021 Briant was interviewed for the documentary film series Schattenwelten.

== Publications ==
- Emma Briant, Greg Philo and Nick Watson Bad News for Disabled People (Inclusion London, 2011)
- Greg Philo, Emma Briant, Pauline Donald, Bad News for Refugees (Pluto Press, 2013),
- Emma Briant Propaganda and Counter-Terrorism: Strategies for Global Change, (Manchester University Press, 2015).
- Emma Briant Propaganda Machine: Inside Cambridge Analytica and the Digital Influence Industry. (Bloomsbury, 2020).
