= Martin M. Lawrence =

American daguerreotypist (1808 - 1859)

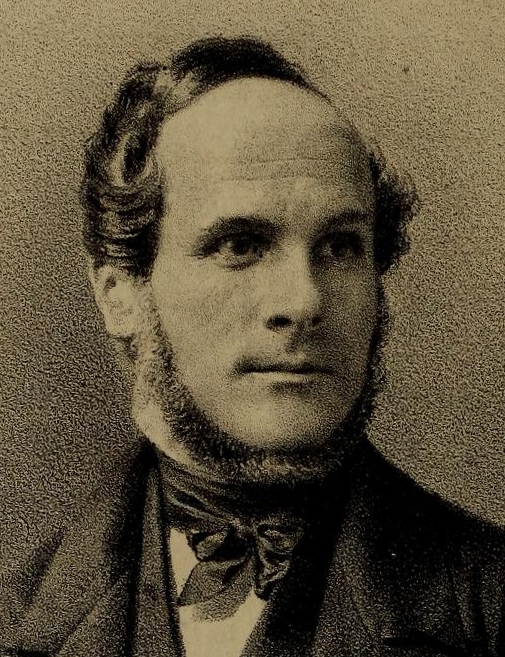
- Born: 1808; United States
- Died: 1859 (aged 50–51); United States
- Occupation: Daguerreotypist

Martin M. Lawrence (1808–1859) was an American daguerreotypist active in New York City. A contemporary of Mathew Brady and Jeremiah Gurney, Lawrence was known for his large daguerreotypes known as "mammoths" and allegorical subjects. He was one of the few American photographers who exhibited at the 1851 Great Exhibition in London, winning a prize for his work. He was elected president of the American Daguerre Association in 1852.
