= Brian Winston =

British journalist (1941–2022)

Brian Norman Winston
- Born: 7 November 1941; Evesham, Worcestershire, England
- Died: 9 April 2022 (aged 80); Lincoln, England
- Education: Merton College, Oxford
- Occupations: Professor, journalist
- Spouse: Adèle Paul
- Children: Two
- Awards: Emmy (1985)

Brian Norman Winston (7 November 1941 – 9 April 2022) was a British journalist who was the first holder of the Lincoln Professorship at the University of Lincoln, United Kingdom. He was a Pro Vice Chancellor for 2005–2006 and the former dean of Media and Humanities. He was awarded an Emmy in 1985 for documentary script writing.

== Biography ==
Winston was born in Evesham, Worcestershire, but grew up in North London, where he attended Kilburn Grammar School before going up to Merton College, Oxford in 1960 to read for a degree in Jurisprudence.

Winston was the founding director of the Glasgow Media Group, and a co-author of its first two books, Bad News (1976) and More Bad News (1980). His former roles included chair of Cinema Studies at New York University, dean of the College of Communications at Penn State University (State College, PA), director of the Centre for Journalism Studies at the University of Wales College of Cardiff, and head of the School of Communication, Design and Media at the University of Westminster.

Winston had worked in television current affairs and features, documentaries and as a print journalist since 1963. He was awarded an Emmy in 1985 for documentary script writing for his contribution to the PBS television series Heritage: Civilization and the Jews. He wrote on free expression and theories of technological change in the media and was also known for being one of the first to address the issue of documentary ethics. His Media, Technology and Society was named the best book of 1998 by the American Association for History and Computing. In 2014, A Right to Offend received a Special Award for "increasing understanding of human rights": International Press Institute (Vienna) Book Awards.

Winston, who had described himself as a British Jew, had been a governor of the British Film Institute, the founding chair of the British Association of Film, Television and Screen Studies and, in 1993, was an instigator of the Visible Evidence international conference series on documentary film.

Winston died in Lincoln on 9 April 2022, at the age of 80.

== Books ==
- Dangling Conversations: The Image of the Media (1973)
- Dangling Conversations: Hardware, Software (1974)
- Bad News: The Structure of Television News (with Glasgow Media Group) (1976)
- More Bad News: The Structure of Television News (with Glasgow Media Group (1980)
- Misunderstanding Media (1986)
- Working with Video (with Julia Keydel) (1986)
- Claiming the Real (1995)
- Technologies of Seeing: Photography, Cinematography and Television (1996)
- Media, Technology and Society: A History: From the Telegraph to the Internet (1998)
- Fires Were Started: BFI Film Classics (1999)
- Lies, Damn Lies and Documentaries (2000)
- The Movies in History: Visions of the Twentieth Century (2000).
- Reporting Diversity: Curriculum Framework (2003)
- Messages: From Gutenberg to Google (2005)
- Claiming the Real II: The Documentary Grierson and After (2008)
- A Right to Offend (2012)
- The Documentary Film Book (ed.) (2013)
- 纪录与方法/Documenting and Methods (with Chi Wang, eds)
- The Rushdie Fatwa and After: A Lesson to the Circumspect (2014)
- The Act of Documenting: Documentary in the 21st Century (with Gail Vanstone and Wang Chi) (2017)
- The Roots of Fake News: Objecting to Objective Journalism (with Matthew Winston)
