= Lawrence Martin-Bittman =

Czech-born author and defector (1931–2018)

Lawrence Bittman
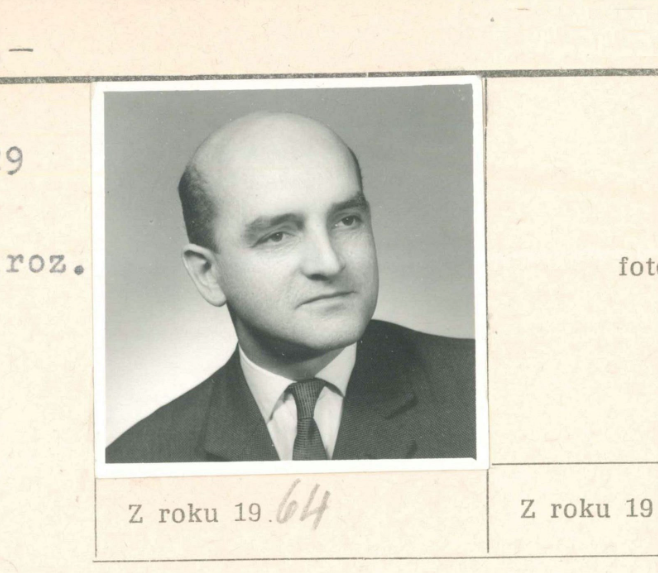
- This illustration shows an excerpt from his "service card" from 1964.
- Born: Ladislav Martin-Bittman; 14 February 1931; Prague, Czechoslovakia (now Czech Republic)
- Died: 18 September 2018 (aged 87); Rockport, Massachusetts, U.S.
- Occupation(s): Czechoslovak Intelligence Officer (former); Author; Professor (Emeritus); Artist
- Known for: Writing
- Notable work: The KGB and Soviet Disinformation; The Deception Game

Lawrence Martin-Bittman (14 February 1931 – 18 September 2018), formerly known as Ladislav Bittman, was an American artist, author, and retired professor of disinformation at Boston University. He was best known for his 1983 book, The KGB and Soviet Disinformation: An Insider's View.

Prior to his defection to the United States in 1968, he served as an intelligence officer specializing in disinformation for the Czechoslovak Intelligence Service.

== Czechoslovak secret services ==
In Czechoslovakia, Ladislav Bittman worked as an intelligence officer and played an integral part in a propaganda operation known as Operation Neptune. He wrote a few books in the 1970s and 1980s about his career and the role of disinformation in Soviet propaganda operations.

== Defection to United States ==
The Soviet invasion of Czechoslovakia and the subsequent end to the Prague Spring became driving forces behind his decision to leave for the United States in 1968. Defectors at that time, most particularly those fleeing the Soviet Union and/or those formerly in positions of government or intelligence, were considered "a valuable source of information" by the US government, which spent at least a year's time in debriefing defectors and in helping them settle down to their new life. As part of the process, he changed his name from Ladislav Bittman to Lawrence Martin (later Lawrence Martin-Bittman) shortly after his debriefing had concluded.

He was sentenced to death in absentia in 1974 by the Czechoslovak government for treason for his defection, a sentence that was not lifted until 20 years later.

== Teaching career ==
In 1972, four years after his defection to the United States, Bittman was given a teaching position at Boston University and primarily taught classes about international media, particularly the press. He began to incorporate classes on disinformation, propaganda, and international intelligence to make use of his former career. In 1986, that led to him founding a new center in Boston University's school of journalism specifically on disinformation.

After the return to the Soviet Union of Nikolai Ryzhkov, the soldier who had defected in Afghanistan, Bittman appeared before Congress along with several others in 1987 to testify about the government's treatment of Soviet defectors.

== Later life ==
In 1996, after a heart attack, which left him unable to teach, Lawrence retired from his position at Boston University and settled down in his home in New England to pursue his hobby of art. He resided in Rockport, Massachusetts, and promoted his art as an honorary member of Local Colors, an artist community in Gloucester, Massachusetts, until he opened his own studio, Studio 006 and a Half.

He died on September 18, 2018, at his home in Rockport at the age of 87.

== See also ==
- Active measures
- Viktor Suvorov
- Ion Mihai Pacepa
- Yuri Bezmenov

== Bibliography ==
- Bittman, Ladislav. The Deception Game; Czechoslovak Intelligence in Soviet Political Warfare. Syracuse, NY: Syracuse U Research, 1972. Print.
- Bittman, Ladislav. The KGB and Soviet Disinformation: An Insider's View. Washington: Pergamon-Brassey's, 1985. Print.
- Bittman, Ladislav (1988), The New Image-Makers: Soviet Propaganda & Disinformation Today, Brassey's Inc, ISBN 978-0-08-034939-8
