= Operation Neptune (espionage) =

1964 Eastern Bloc disinformation operation involving fake Nazi-era documents

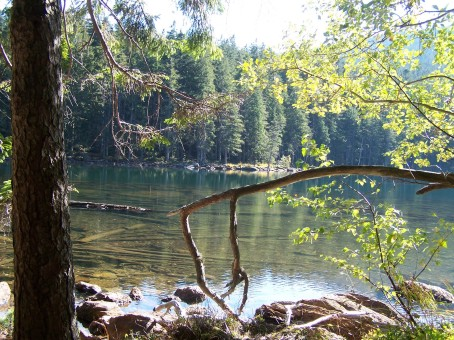
- Czech Republic lake Černé jezero - eastern bank
- Russian: Операция «Нептун»
- Romanization: Operatsiya "Nyeptun"

Operation Neptune was a 1964 disinformation operation by the secret services of Czechoslovakia (State Security) and the Soviet Union (KGB) and involved fake Nazi-era documents that were found in submerged chests.

Operation Neptune's objectives were to discredit Western politicians by revealing the names of former Nazi informants whom they were still using as spies in Eastern Europe and to place pressure on West Germany to extend the statute of limitations on the prosecution of war criminals, including extending the statute of limitations.

== Story ==
In 1964, the Czechoslovak State Security publicly claimed to have discovered Nazi-era intelligence files hidden beneath the surface of Černé jezero, a Czech Republic lake in the Šumava, on the border with West Germany.

The four chests containing the papers were supposedly discovered during the making of a documentary in the presence of members of the Western press. In fact, State Security itself had placed them there in collaboration with the KGB.

The apparent discovery was a disinformation operation, the largest conducted by the State Security. The fake papers were found in sunken chests, which had been carefully doctored to appear as if they had been submerged since World War II. The chests had been brought from the Soviet Union. The agent who led the divers to make the discovery and who had originally placed them in the lake, Ladislav Bittman, later known as Lawrence Martin-Bittman, defected to the West in 1968 and published a book on the plot.

One scholar argues that the papers were possibly genuine although the former Czechoslovak spy Josef Frolík described them in his 1975 memoirs as forgeries.

== Result ==
The operation also succeeded in worsening relations between Germany and Italy, as the names published included people who had lived in Germany and worked against Italy during the war. The operation had some temporary success.

== Later history ==
The Czech civilian intelligence agency posted the files on Operation Neptune on its website.

== See also ==
- Active measures
