= John Westergaard (sociologist) =

British-Danish sociologist and academic

John Harald Westergaard AcSS (13 October 1927 – 3 May 2014) was a British-Danish sociologist and academic. He was chair in sociological studies at the University of Sheffield between 1975 and 1986, and president of the British Sociological Association (1991–93).

== Life ==
John Harald Westergaard was born on 13 October 1927 in Putney, London, to Otto and Inger Westergaard; his parents were Danish and his father was a civil engineer. In 1938, with his parents about to divorce, Westergaard moved to Denmark with his mother and was sent to boarding school in Copenhagen; his experiences under Nazi occupation and his mother's attachment to the Danish resistance movement during the Second World War encouraged an opposition to authority and a belief in socialism. He was briefly a censor in the British Army of the Rhine and then completed a sociology degree at the London School of Economics (LSE), graduating in 1951. He was a researcher to Ruth Glass at University College London, before moving to the University of Nottingham for the 1955–56 year. He then returned to the LSE as a lecturer, and secured promotion to a readership in sociology in 1970.

In 1975, he was appointed as Keith Kelsall's successor to the chair in Sociological Studies at the University of Sheffield. He retired in 1986 amid funding cuts and declining student numbers which had led to the sociology honours degree course falling into abeyance at Sheffield. His early retirement – and that of Eric Sainsbury (chair in Social Administration) – was carried out to ensure that junior staff did not lose their jobs. In the meantime, he had also been Deputy Dean and Dean of the Faculty of Social Sciences at Sheffield between 1982 and 1986. In retirement, he remained associated with the university as an emeritus professor; he also held visiting posts and served as president of the British Sociological Association from 1991 to 1993. He was also an Academician of the Academy of Social Sciences.

Westergaard's research focused on social class and inequality in capitalist societies; his Marxist interpretation was unorthodox in its focus on income distribution rather than productive relations. With Henrietta Resler, he co-wrote Class in a Capitalist Society in 1975, arguing that class inequalities had persisted in post-war Britain; his book Who Gets What?: The Hardening of Class Inequality in the Late Twentieth Century (1995) articulated his belief that inequalities had persisted in the meantime. Alan Walker wrote that "He championed the study of class inequality as a defining feature of capitalism, long before its importance became more widely acknowledged, and played key roles in the development of the sociology profession."

Westergaard was married twice and had four children (one of whom died in infancy) and a step-son. He died on 3 May 2014.

== Publications ==
- (Co-authored with Henrietta Resler) Class in a Capitalist Society (Basic Books, 1975).
- (Co-authored with Alan Walker and Iain Noble) After Redundancy: The Experience of Economic Instability (Wiley, 1989).
- Who Gets What?: The Hardening of Class Inequality in the Late Twentieth Century (Polity, 1995).

Academic offices
Preceded by Keith Kelsall	Chair in Sociological Studies, University of Sheffield; 1975–1986	Succeeded by Vacant; Next successor: Richard Jenkins (from 1995)
Preceded by Robert Burgess	President, British Sociological Association; 1991–1993	Succeeded by Michèle Barrett
