= History of the United Kingdom (1945–present) =

For general overviews of British politics since 1945, see:

- Post-war Britain (1945–1979)
- Political history of the United Kingdom (1979–present)

While coverage of British social history over the same period can be found below:

- Social history of post-war Britain (1945–1979)
- Social history of the United Kingdom (1979–present)

== See also ==
- History of the United Kingdom
  - Political history of the United Kingdom
- Post-war
  - Post-war consensus
