= Peter H. Mann =

English sociologist

Peter Henry Mann (5 September 1926 – 2 August 2008) was an English sociologist who spent most of his career at the University of Sheffield, eventually as a reader in sociology. He was a pioneering specialist in urban sociology .

== Life ==
Born in 1926, Mann served as a radio officer in the Merchant Navy during the Second World War, before he joined the University of Leeds in 1947. After graduating, he completed a master's degree at the University of Liverpool, and then carried out his doctoral studies at the University of Nottingham; his PhD was awarded in 1955 for his thesis "Community and neighbourhood with reference to social status".

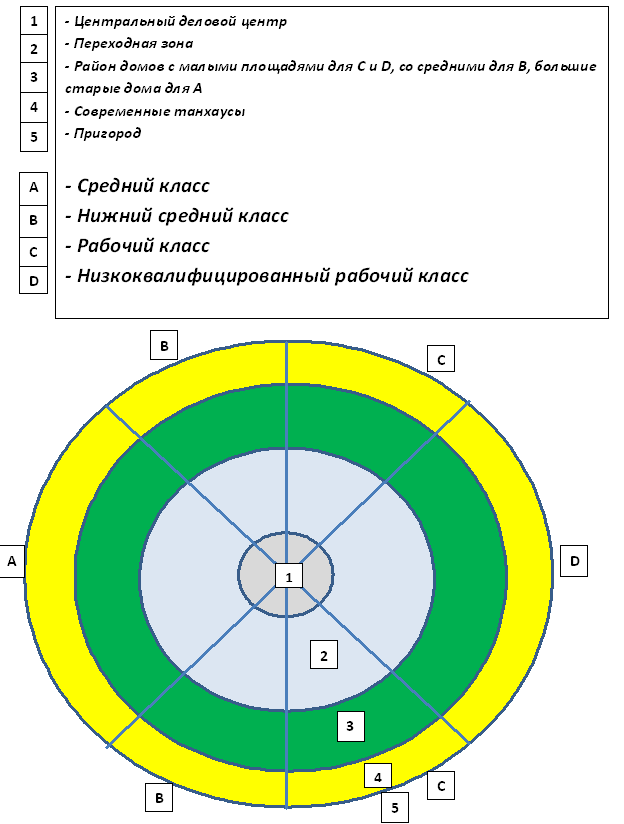
Mann's social modell of a city

While completing his doctorate, Mann was the University Research Fellow in Sociology and was a pioneering specialist in urban sociology. He had also been appointed to the University of Sheffield's first lecturer in sociology in 1951, and remained there for the rest of his career, eventually securing promotions to a senior lectureship and then a readership. In 1956, a new chair of sociology was established at Sheffield, occupied by Keith Kelsall, who was also Dean of Social Sciences; in practice, Mann was largely responsible for the running of the Department of Sociology in the early 1960s. He and Kelsall were responsible for creating the university's first honours degree in sociology, which was established by 1961. Between 1975 and 1980, he was (with Professor Wilf Saunders) joint head of the Centre for Research on User Studies. After retiring, he was appointed Director of the Library and Information Statistics Unit at the University of Loughborough (1983–1991).

Mann was among the early students of urban sociology. He was commissioned by the Vicar of St Mary's Church in Bramall Lane, Sheffield, to conduct a neighbourhood survey, assessing community needs; the work laid the foundations for a new community centre, providing social services to residents. Much of his later research was devoted to the sociology of books and reading, theatre-going, and the way that books are marketed.

Outside of academia, Mann was enjoyed working with amateur theatre groups, listening to brass bands, watching Rugby, and hosting parties with his wife Margaret. He died on 2 August 2008; in an obituary Eric Sainsbury remembered "with pleasure and gratitude Peter's commitment to sound research" and his role as a pioneering sociologist at the University of Sheffield.
