= English Disease =

The English disease or British disease may refer to:

- The British disease, a term for the economic stagnation the United Kingdom underwent during the 1970s
- Football hooliganism in the United Kingdom, which was often referred to as the "English disease"
- Sudor anglicus, also known as the sweating sickness, common in sixteenth-century Europe
- Rickets
- The English Disease, a novel by Joseph Skibell
- The English Disease, an album by the Barmy Army, a moniker for Adrian Sherwood
