= Walter Minchinton =

British economic historian (1921–1996)

- Born: Walter Edward Minchinton; April 29, 1921
- Died: August 25, 1996 (aged 75)
- Occupation: Historian / Academic
- Employer: University of Exeter
- Awards: Fellow of the Royal Historical Society (FRHistS)

Walter Edward Minchinton, FRHistS (29 April 1921 – 25 August 1996) was a British historian and academic. He was Professor of Economic History at the University of Exeter from 1964 to 1986.

== Life ==
Minchinton was the son of Walter Edward Minchinton and his wife Annie Border Minchinton. A graduate of the London School of Economics, the younger Minchinton served as an officer in the Second World War and in 1948 was appointed to an assistant lectureship at University College Swansea; he was promoted to a full lectureship in 1950, and then to be a senior lecturer in 1959. In 1964, the University of Exeter established its Economic History Department, and appointed Minchinton as its head; he served in that capacity until 1984. He was also Professor of Economic History at Exeter from 1964 to 1986, during which time he was also editor of the Exeter Papers in Economic History series. Among a range of other commitments, he was chairman of the Devon History Society from 1967 to 1986, of the Exeter Industrial Archaeology Group from 1967 to 1992, and of the British Agricultural History Society from 1968 to 1971. He was also a Fellow of the Royal Historical Society and won the RHS's Alexander Prize in 1953 for his article "Bristol – metropolis of the west in the eighteenth century".

Minchinton retired from Exeter in 1986 and was appointed to an emeritus professorship. With his wife Marjory (née Sargood) he had four children. He died on 25 August 1996.

== Publications ==
- The British Tinplate Industry: A History (Clarendon Press, 1957).
- (Editor) The Trade of Bristol in the Eighteenth Century (Bristol Record Society, Vol. 20, 1957).
- (Editor) Politics and the Port of Bristol in the Eighteenth Century: The Petitions of the Society of Merchant Venturers, 1698–1803 (Bristol Record Society, Vol. 23, 1963).
- Industrial Archaeology in Devon (Dartington Amenity Research Trust, 1968; 2nd ed., 1973; 3rd ed., 1976).
- (Editor) Essays in Agrarian History (David & Charles, 1968).
- (Editor) Industrial South Wales 1750–1914: Essays in Welsh Economic History (Frank Cass, 1969; reprinted by Routledge, 2006).
- (Editor) Mercantilism, System or Expediency? (D. C. Heath & Co., 1969).
- The Growth of English Overseas Trade in the Seventeenth and Eighteenth Centuries (Methuen, 1969).
- (Co-authored with Keith Kelsall and R. H. Tawney) Wage Regulation in Pre-industrial England (David & Charles, 1972).
- Devon at Work: Past and Present (David & Charles, 1974).
- Windmills of Devon (Exeter Industrial Archaeology Group, 1977).
- (Co-authored with Peter Harper) American Papers in the House of Lords Record Office: A Guide (1983).
- A Limekiln Miscellany: The South-West and South Wales (Exeter Industrial Archaeology Group, 1984).
- (Co-authored with Celia King and Peter Waite) Virginia Slave-Trade Statistics 1698–1775 (Virginia State Library, 1984).
- A Guide to Industrial Archaeological Sites in Britain (Grenada, 1984).
- Devon’s Industrial Past: A Guide (Dartington Centre for Education and Research, 1986).
- Life to the City: An Illustrated History of Exeter's Water Supply From the Romans to the Present Day (Devon Books, 1987).
- (Editor) The Northern Seas: Politics, Economics and Culture: Eight Essays (Lofthouse, 1989).
- (Co-editor with Lewis R. Fischer) People of the Northern Seas (International Maritime History Association, 1992).
