= Annette Kuhn =

British academic

- Born: Annette Frieda Kuhn; England, United Kingdom
- Education: University of Sheffield, University of London
- Occupations: Author; cultural historian; educator; researcher; editor; feminist
- Notable work: The Oxford Dictionary of Film Studies

Annette Frieda Kuhn, FBA is a British author, cultural historian, educator, researcher, editor and feminist. She is known for her work in screen studies, visual culture, film history and cultural memory. She is Emeritus Professor in Film Studies at Queen Mary University of London.

== Career ==
Kuhn earned a bachelor's degree in 1969 and master's degree in 1975 in sociology at the University of Sheffield. While at Sheffield, she served as the Research Officer at the Sheffield Students' Union, during which period she worked on a campaign for a University crèche. Kuhn also co-convened the Sheffield University Women's Studies Group, organising public seminars and film screenings. As a research assistant at Sheffield she co-authored a survey of British university graduates which supported the notion that first children among several have higher educational achievement than their siblings. During the same period, she also co-authored, with Keith Kelsall, "Graduates: The Sociology of the Elite", which looked at women graduates and their careers, or lack thereof.

She co-edited Feminism and Materialism (1978) with AnnMarie Wolpe, was part of the founding editorial collective of Feminist Review (1979- ) and was a member of the women's photography group Second Sight.

In the mid-1970s, Kuhn began writing, teaching and publishing in film studies, often from a feminist standpoint. Her books included Women's Pictures: Feminism and Cinema (1982, rev. ed. 1994), in which Kuhn defined a variant of fictional realism as "new women's cinema" which targeted a working woman audience of the mid-1970s; and The Power of the Image: Essays on Representation and Sexuality (1985). Kuhn co-edited The Women's Companion to International Film (1990) with Susannah Radstone. She taught classes in adult and higher education in both the UK and the USA.

Kuhn served on the editorial board of the journal Screen from 1976 to 1985 and rejoined the journal as a co-editor on its move to Oxford University Press in 1989, standing down in 2014. In the late 1970s, she joined five other women in forming a feminist forum which roundly criticized the fashion press and their perpetuation of a stereotype in women's clothing. In 1986 she completed a PhD on the history of film censorship at the University of London. From 1984 to the early 1990s she was a commissioning editor for 'Questions for Feminism', a series of socialist-feminist books published by Verso, and in the late 1980s worked as desk editor in Verso's editorial office in London. Some documents from the early phase of Kuhn's career are lodged in the Women's Library at the London School of Economics.

== Teaching ==
As lecturer in Sociology at Goldsmiths College (1974–76), Kuhn taught classes on women and the family and the sexual division of labour.

In 1989 Kuhn joined the University of Glasgow as a lecturer in Film and Television and was promoted to Reader in Film and Television Studies in 1991, in the Department of Theatre, Film and Television Studies. She moved to Lancaster University in 1998 as Reader in Cultural Research and was promoted to Professor of Film Studies in 2000. In 2006, Kuhn moved to Queen Mary University of London and is now Emeritus Professor in Film Studies. Since 2002 she has served on the Advisory Board of the Raphael Samuel History Centre (University of East London/Birkbeck University of London) and on the Education and Culture Committee of Phoenix Cinema (Finchley, London) since 2009.

Kuhn has held visiting professorships at the University of Iowa, the University of Wisconsin, Madison, Masaryk University and Stockholm University; and fellowships at the Humanities Research Centre at the Australian National University, Macquarie University, and the Five Colleges Women's Studies Research Center at Mount Holyoke College. Kuhn has delivered keynote lectures, invited talks and workshops also in Canada, Finland, Germany, Italy, the Netherlands, South Africa, Spain and Switzerland. Her writings have been translated into at least ten languages.

== Notable works ==
Since the early 1990s, Kuhn has researched, and written widely on, cinemagoing and memory, in work arising from a large-scale project called "Cinema Culture in 1930s Britain", which she directed and which involved gathering a considerable body of questionnaire and depth-interview material from several hundred surviving cinemagoers of the 1930s. The project's findings have been discussed in a number of radio programmes, as well as in books (in particular An Everyday Magic: Cinema and Cultural Memory), articles, chapters and conference papers; and it has become a significant reference point for current research and community activity around cinema memory and histories of film reception. Materials gathered in the course of the 1930s project are now, as the Cinema Memory Archive, part of Lancaster University Library's Special Collections, where they are available for consultation by other researchers. Much of the material is also available online.

Annette Kuhn has grouped scholarly work on women's genres into two camps—one that emphasizes contexts (often TV studies), and one that emphasizes texts (often film studies).

— Julie D'Acci, Defining Women: Television and the Case of Cagney & Lacey

Concurrently, Kuhn has inquired into photography and cultural memory, with a particular interest in the uses of and meanings attaching to family photographs, conducting research and workshops, giving talks and producing writings on the subject. Her book Family Secrets is widely cited and continues to be drawn on by writers and artists, especially feminists, conducting autoethnographic work with personal photographs, as well as by readers inspired to conduct memory work with their own family albums.

The Oxford Dictionary of Film Studies (2012, 2nd edition 2020), which Kuhn co-authored with her Queen Mary University of London colleague Guy Westwell, was several years in the making. It is grounded in a systematic overview of the discipline, both historically and as it is currently taught and researched, with the aim of producing an inclusive map of the field that would eventually generate the topics addressed in the dictionary, permit assessment of each headword and entry in light of its place in the discipline's overall architecture, supply a picture of the interconnections between various areas of inquiry, and generate a framework for cross-references that would allow users to follow personal paths through the dictionary and make their own discoveries about the discipline. In both its print and online versions, the Dictionary is widely used in screen studies teaching at all levels, as well as by film critics and film-lovers.

== Awards ==
In 1994, Kuhn was awarded a Fulbright Senior Research Scholarship to study six months at Mount Holyoke College in the Five College Women's Studies program in order to complete work on the Family Secrets project, research for "The Daughter’s Lament: Memory Work and Productions of the Self".

In 2004, she was elected to the Fellowship of the British Academy, and in 2016 to Membership of the European Academy (Academia Europaea).

The Annette Kuhn Essay Award was established by Screen in 2014, in recognition of Kuhn's outstanding contribution to Screen and her wider commitment to the development of screen studies and screen theory.

== Selected works ==
- Feminism and Materialism: Women and Modes of Production. London: Routledge and Kegan Paul, 1978. Co-edited.
- Ideology and Cultural Production. London: Croom Helm, 1979. Co-edited.
- Women's Pictures: Feminism and Cinema. London: Routledge and Kegan Paul, 1982; 2nd edn, Verso, 1994. Authored.
- The Power of the Image: Essays on Representation and Sexuality. London: Routledge and Kegan Paul, 1985. Authored.
- "Women's Genres," in Home Is Where the Heart Is: Studies in Melodrama and the Women's Film (ed. C. Gledhill). London: British Film Institute, 1987. Authored.
- Cinema, Censorship and Sexuality, 1909 to 1925. London: Routledge and Kegan Paul, 1988. Authored.
- Alien Zone: Cultural Theory and Contemporary Science Fiction Cinema. London: Verso, 1990. Edited.
- The Women's Companion to International Film. London: Virago; and Berkeley, CA: University of California Press, 1990. Edited.
- Family Secrets: Acts of Memory and Imagination. London: Verso, 1995; rev edn, 2002. Authored.
- Queen of the Bs: Ida Lupino Behind the Camera. Bradford-on-Avon: Flicks Books; New York: Praeger, 1995. Edited.
- Screen Histories: A Screen Reader. Oxford, Oxford University Press, 1998. Co-edited.
- Alien Zone II: The Spaces of Science Fiction Cinema. London: Verso, 1999. Edited.
- An Everyday Magic: Cinema and Cultural Memory. London: I.B. Tauris, 2002. Published in the US as Dreaming of Fred and Ginger: Cinema and Cultural Memory. New York: New York University Press. Authored.
- Screening World Cinema: a Screen Reader. London: Routledge, 2006. Co-edited.
- Locating Memory: Photographic Acts. Oxford and New York: Berghahn Books, 2006. Co-edited.
- Ratcatcher. London: Palgrave MacMillan, 2008, 2020. Authored.
- Screen Theorizing Today: A Celebration of Screen’s Fiftieth Anniversary. Oxford: Oxford University Press, 2009. Edited.
- The Oxford Dictionary of Film Studies. Oxford University Press, 2012, 2020. Co-authored.
- Little Madnesses: Winnicott, Transitional Phenomena and Cultural Experience. London: I.B. Tauris, 2013. Edited.
