= Richard Jenkins (sociologist) =

Richard Jenkins FAcSS
- Born: 1952 (age 73–74); Liverpool, England
- Title: Professor Emeritus

Academic background
- Education: University of Cambridge; Queen's University Belfast
- Thesis: Young people, education and work in a Belfast housing estate (1981)

Academic work
- Discipline: Sociologist
- Institutions: Aston University; University College, Swansea; University of Sheffield

Richard Jenkins FAcSS (born 1952) is a sociologist and retired academic. From 1995 to 2014, he was chair in Sociology at the University of Sheffield.

== Life ==
Richard Jenkins was born in 1952 in Liverpool and grew up in Northern Ireland. He studied social anthropology at Queen's University Belfast, and the University of Cambridge, where he completed his doctoral studies; his PhD was awarded in 1981 for his thesis "Young people, education and work in a Belfast housing estate". After working at the Social Science Research Council Unit on Ethnic Relations at Aston University, Jenkins took up a post at University College Swansea in 1983. He moved to the University of Sheffield in 1995 to take up the chair in Sociology, which had been vacant since 1986. His work covered "the transition to adulthood, ethnicity and racism, nationalism, informal economic activity, the social lives of people with learning difficulties, and modern supernatural and witchcraft beliefs", supported by field work in the Ireland and Great Britain; in Belfast, the West Midlands, south Wales, and the south-west of England, and in Skive in Denmark. He retired in 2014 but remains at Sheffield as an emeritus professor. In 2004, he was elected to the Academy of Social Sciences.

== Publications ==
- Hightown Rules: Growing up in a Belfast Housing Estate (National Youth Bureau, 1982).
- Lads, Citizens and Ordinary Kids: Working-class Youth Life-Styles in Belfast (Routledge and Kegan Paul, 1983).
- Racism and Recruitment: Managers, Organisations and Equal Opportunity in the Labour Market (Cambridge University Press, 1986).
- (Co-authored with Susan Hutson) Taking the Strain: Families, Unemployment and the Transition to Adulthood (Open University Press, 1989).
- (Co-authored with Philip Harding) The Myth of the Hidden Economy: Towards a New Understanding of Informal Economic Activity (Open University Press, 1989).
- Pierre Bourdieu (Routledge, 1992; 2nd edition, 2002).
- Social Identity (Routledge, 1996; 2nd edition, 2004; 3rd edition, 2008; 4th edition, 2014).
- Rethinking Ethnicity: Arguments and Explorations (SAGE, 1997, 2nd edition, 2008).
- The Archaeologist (Citron Press, 1998).
- Foundations of Sociology: Towards a Better Understanding of the Human World (Palgrave Macmillan, 2002).
- Being Danish: Paradoxes of Identity in Everyday Life (Museum Tusculanum Press, 2011; 2nd edition, 2012; 3rd edition, 2014).
- Black Magic and Bogeymen: Fear, Rumour and Popular Belief in the North of Ireland 1972–7 (Cork University Press, 2014).

Academic offices
Preceded by Vacant; Predecessor: John Westergaard (retired in 1986)	Chair in Sociological Studies, University of Sheffield; 1995–2014	Succeeded by ??
