= Social history of the United Kingdom (1979–present) =

Modern Britain
- 3 May 1979 – present
Postwar Era
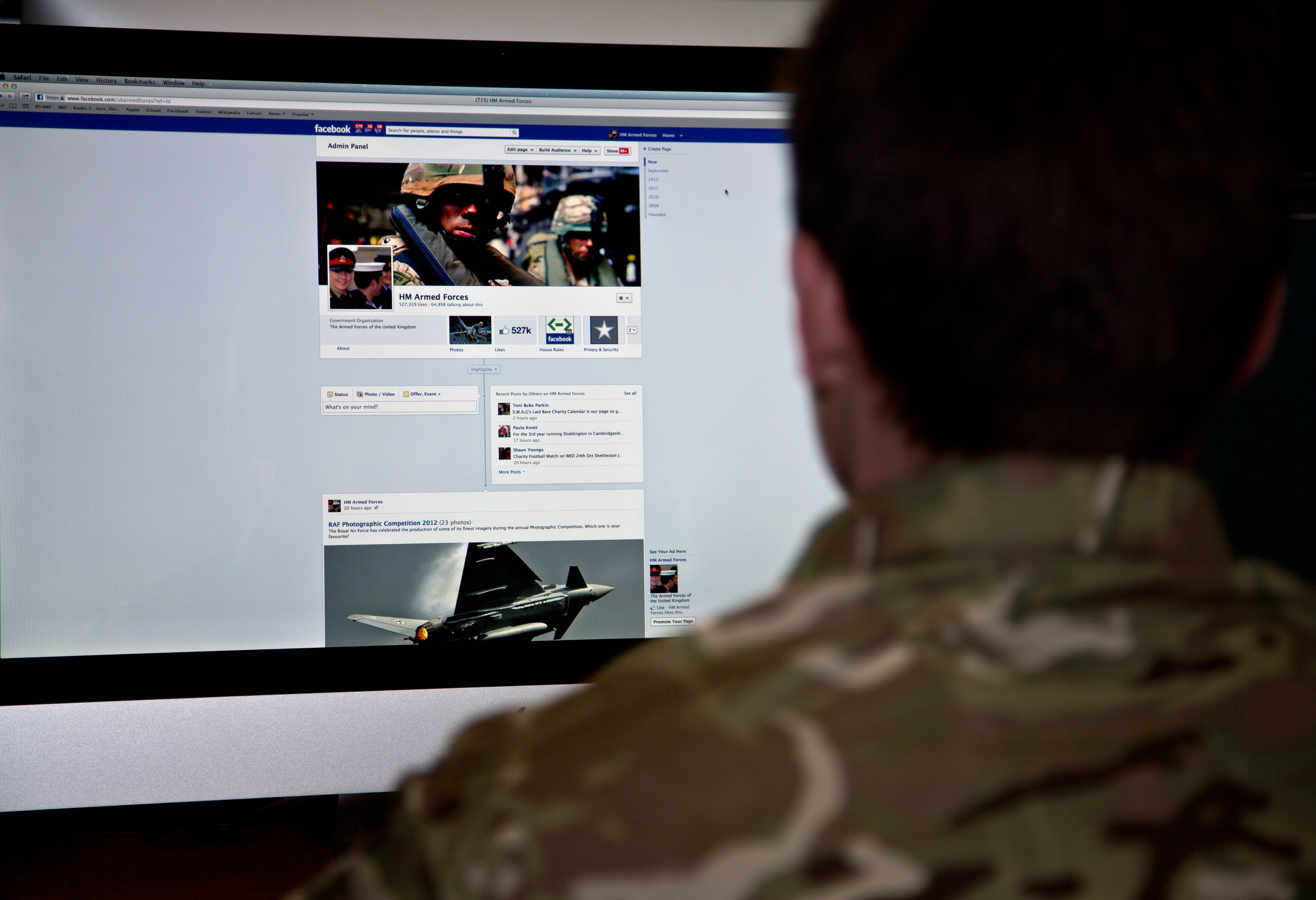
- A soldier in London browses social media during 2012: use of the internet and computerised technology has expanded from a rare novelty in the 1970s to being ubiquitous in almost all aspects of life today.
- Monarchs: Elizabeth II; Charles III
- Leaders: Margaret Thatcher; John Major; Tony Blair; Gordon Brown; David Cameron; Theresa May; Boris Johnson; Liz Truss; Rishi Sunak; Keir Starmer; Andy Burnham

The modern social history of the United Kingdom (1979–present) began with Conservative Prime Minister, Margaret Thatcher (1979–1990) entering government and rejecting the post-war consensus in the 1980s. She privatised most state-owned industries and worked to weaken the power and influence of the trade unions. The party remained in government throughout most of the 1990s albeit with growing internal difficulties under the leadership of Prime Minister John Major (1990–1997).

The "New Labour" premiership of Tony Blair (1997–2007) accepted many of Thatcher's economic policies, but he presided over a period of relative economic prosperity. Hong Kong, the most prosperous and the last significant overseas territory was handed back to China in 1997, ending 156 years of British rule and the symbolic end of the empire. Blair's government grew unpopular after 2002, in part due to Britain's participation in the war on terror and, most controversially, the Iraq War. The brief premiership of Gordon Brown (2007–2010) was predominantly defined by a series of crises including the 2008 financial crisis and its consequences.

The Coalition government (2010–2015) formed by David Cameron and Nick Clegg introduced a deficit reduction programme primarily via cuts to public spending. In 2014, a referendum on Scottish Independence was held where the electorate in Scotland voted by 55/45% to remain within the United Kingdom. Winning a majority in 2015, the conservatives held a referendum on the UK's membership of the EU the following year where the UK voted by 52/48% to leave the organisation. The premiership of Theresa May (2016–2019) was defined by the UK's withdrawal from the EU which was completed under the premiership of Boris Johnson (2019–2022); his government was also defined by the COVID-19 pandemic.

Other shifts in the UK during the late 20th and early 21st century include the rise of the internet with computerised technology taking an ever greater role in most aspects of life, rising enrolment in further and higher education among older adolescents and young adults, as well as a diminishing interest in politics with 21st century elections seeing consistently lower turnout than their 20th century counterparts. The New Labour era and current period of consecutive conservative or conservative led governments have seen the devolution of substantial powers to Wales, Scotland, Northern Ireland and, to a lesser extent, parts of England.

== Thatcher's Britain ==
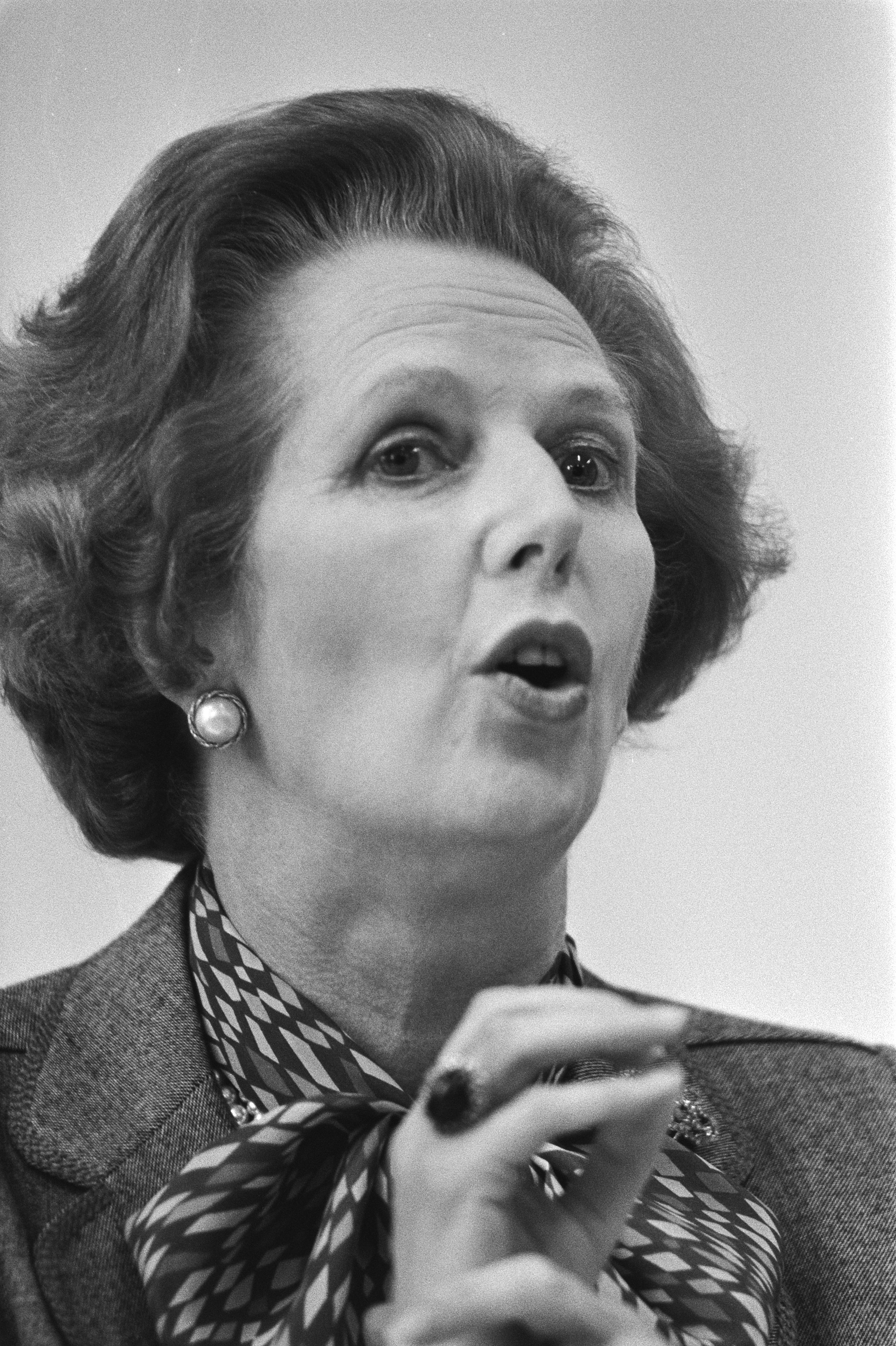
Margaret Thatcher (pictured in 1983) was Prime Minister of the United Kingdom from 1979 to 1990.

Margaret Thatcher was the dominant political force of the late twentieth century, often compared to Churchill and David Lloyd George for her transformative agenda commonly referred to as "Thatcherism". She was Leader of the Conservative Party from 1975 to 1990, and prime minister from 1979 to 1990. She was often called the "Iron Lady" for her uncompromising politics and leadership style.

Political analyst Dennis Kavanagh concludes that the "Thatcher Government produced such a large number of far-reaching changes across much of the policy spectrum, that it passes 'reasonable' criteria of effectiveness, radicalism, and innovation".

The Labour Party under James Callaghan (1976–79) contested the 1979 general election as unemployment passed the 1,000,000 mark and trade unions became more aggressive. The Conservatives used a highly effective poster created by advertisers Saatchi & Saatchi, showing an unemployment queue snaking into the distance, carrying the caption "Labour isn't working". The Conservatives received 43.9% of the vote and 339 seats to Labour's 269, for an overall majority of 44 seats at the 1979 general election. Labour was weakened by the steady long-term decline in the proportion of manual workers in the electorate. Twice as many manual workers normally voted Labour as voted Conservative, but they now constituted only 56% of the electorate. When the Labour Party led by Harold Wilson narrowly won the 1964 general election, manual workers had accounted for 63%. Furthermore, they were beginning to turn against the trade unions – alienated, perhaps, by the difficulties of the winter of 1978–9. In contrast, Conservative policies stressed wider home ownership, which Labour refused to match. Thatcher did best in districts where the economy was relatively strong and was weaker where it was contracting.

=== Thatcherism ===
As prime minister, she implemented policies focused on economic liberalism, using populism, and pragmatism, known as Thatcherism. Thatcher introduced a series of political and economic initiatives intended to reverse high unemployment and Britain's struggles in the wake of the Winter of Discontent and an ongoing recession. Her political philosophy and economic policies emphasised deregulation (particularly of the financial sector), flexible labour markets, the privatisation of state-owned companies and reducing the power and influence of trade unions. Due to recession and high unemployment, Thatcher's popularity during her first years in office waned until the beginning of 1982, a few months before the Falklands War. The afterglow of her victory at that war produced a resounding victory at the polls. She was re-elected in 1983 with an increased majority.

Privatisation was an enduring legacy of Thatcherism; it was accepted by the future Labour ministry of Tony Blair. Her policy was to privatise nationalised corporations (such as telephone and aerospace firms). She sold public housing to tenants, all on favourable terms. The policy developed an important electoral dimension during the second Thatcher government (1983–87). It involved more than denationalisation: wider share ownership was the second plank of the policy. Thatcher advocated an "enterprise society" in Britain, especially in widespread share-ownership, personal ownership of council houses, the marginalisation of trade unions and the expansion of private healthcare. These policies transformed many aspects of British society.

Thatcher was re-elected for a third term in 1987, although Labour made gains under the new leadership of Neil Kinnock compared to their landslide defeat at the previous election. During this period, her support for a Community Charge (popularly referred to as the "poll tax") was widely unpopular (especially in Scotland where the tax was enforced one year earlier than the rest of the country) and her negative views on the European Community were not shared by others in her Cabinet. She lost support from Conservative MPs and resigned as Prime Minister of the United Kingdom and Leader of the Conservative Party in November 1990.

=== Cultural movements ===
Environmentalism as a major public issue was brought to the forefront by Thatcher in 1988, when she included a manifesto warning about climate change. The environmentalism movements of the 1980s reduced the emphasis on intensive farming, and promoted organic farming and conservation of the countryside.

Protestant religious observance declined notably in Britain during the second half of the twentieth century. Catholicism (based on the Irish elements) held its own, while Islam grew rapidly due to immigration from Asia and the Middle East as well as higher birth rates from that sector of the general population. Church of England attendance particularly dropped, although charismatic churches like Elim and AOG grew. The movement to Keep Sunday Special seemed to have lost at the beginning of the 21st century.

==== LGBT rights under Thatcher ====
Although "homosexual acts" had been partially decriminalised for consenting men over the age of 21 in England and Wales in 1967 (Sexual Offences Act 1967), it was not until the Criminal Justice (Scotland) Act 1980 that the same happened in Scotland. That same year, the documentary A Change of Sex aired on BBC2, which enabled viewers to follow the social and medical transition of Julia Grant, and provided a snapshot of the Gender Identity Clinic at Charing Cross Hospital in London. The Self Help Association for Transsexuals (SHAFT) was also formed as an information collecting and disseminating body for transgender people, The first Black Gay and Lesbian Group was formed in the UK. and Lionel Blue became the first British rabbi to come out as gay. The UK's first television series specifically aimed at a gay audience was broadcast on London Weekend Television, called Gay Life.

In 1981, the European Court of Human Rights in Dudgeon v United Kingdom struck down Northern Ireland's criminalisation of homosexual acts between consenting adults the Homosexual Offences (Northern Ireland) Order 1982 later partially decriminalised "homosexual acts" in Northern Ireland. The next year, Chris Smith, says: "My name is Chris Smith. I'm the Labour MP for Islington South and Finsbury, and I'm gay", making him the first openly out gay politician in the UK parliament. The Politics of Bisexuality conference in 1984 signaled the growth of separate bisexual community organising. Lesbians and Gays Support the Miners, a campaign of LGBT support for striking workers in the miners' strike of 1984 and 1985, was launched. In 1988, Princess Margaret opened the UK's first residential support centre for people living with HIV and AIDS in London at London Lighthouse.

In July 1990, following the murders in a short period of time, of four gay men, hundreds of lesbians and gay men marched from the park where Boothe had been killed to Ealing Town Hall and held a candlelit vigil. The demonstration led to the formation of OutRage, who called for the police to start protecting gay men instead of arresting them. In September, lesbian and gay police officers established the Lesbian and Gay Police Association (Lagpa/GPA). The first gay pride event was held in Manchester. Oranges Are Not the Only Fruit by Jeanette Winterson, a semi-autobiographical screenplay about her lesbian life was shown on BBC television. Justin Fashanu became the first professional footballer to come out in the press (he subsequently committed suicide). The Crown Dependency of Jersey decriminalised homosexuality.

===== AIDS =====
The first UK case of AIDS was recorded when a 49-year-old man was admitted to Royal Brompton Hospital in London suffering from PCP (Pneumocystis carinii pneumonia). He died ten days later. Terry Higgins died of AIDS in St Thomas' Hospital in London, and his friends and partner Martyn Butler set up the Terry Higgins Trust (which became the Terrence Higgins Trust), the first UK AIDS charity. In 1983, Britain reported 17 cases of AIDS; gay men were asked not to donate blood. The next year, Britain reported 108 cases of AIDS with 46 deaths from the disease.

In 1985, AIDS hysteria grew in the UK when passengers on the Queen Elizabeth 2 curtailed their holiday after a person with AIDS was discovered on board. Cunard were criticised in the press for trying to cover this up. A London support group Body Positive was set up that year as a self-help group for people affected by HTLV-3 and AIDS. Health Minister, Kenneth Clarke, enacted powers to detain people with AIDS in hospital against their will, potentially preventing people coming forward for treatment. In 1987, the first UK specialist HIV ward was opened by Diana, Princess of Wales; at the opening she made a point of not wearing protective gloves or a mask when she shook hands with the patients. AZT, the first HIV drug to show promise of suppressing the disease was made available in the UK for the first time.

===== Section 28 =====
In 1987, Thatcher said at the Conservative Party conference: "Children who need to be taught to respect traditional moral values are being taught that they have an inalienable right to be gay". Backbench Conservative MPs and Peers had already begun a backlash against the promotion of homosexuality and, in December 1987, Clause 28 was introduced into a bill on local governance by Jill Knight, Conservative MP for Birmingham Edgbaston.

In 1988, Section 28 of the Local Government Act 1988 enacted as an amendment to the United Kingdom's Local Government Act 1986, on 24 May 1988 stated that a local authority "shall not intentionally promote homosexuality or publish material with the intention of promoting homosexuality" or "promote the teaching in any maintained school of the acceptability of homosexuality as a pretended family relationship". Almost identical legislation was enacted for Scotland by the Westminster Parliament. Sir Ian McKellen came out on BBC Radio 3 in response to the governments proposed Section 28 in the British Parliament. McKellen has stated that he was influenced in his decision by the advice and support of his friends, among them the gay author Armistead Maupin. In 1989, the campaign group Stonewall UK was set up to oppose Section 28 and other barriers to equality.

=== Economic change ===
==== Household prosperity ====
From 1964 to 1996, income per head doubled, while ownership of various household goods significantly increased. By 1996, two-thirds of households owned cars, 82% had central heating, most people owned a VCR, and one in five houses had a home computer. In 1971, 9% of households had no access to a shower or bathroom, compared with only 1% in 1990; largely due to demolition or modernisation of older properties that lacked such facilities. In 1971, only 35% had central heating, while 78% enjoyed this amenity in 1990. By 1990, 93% of households had colour television, 87% had telephones, 86% had washing machines, 80% had deep-freezers, 60% had video-recorders and 47% had microwave ovens. Holiday entitlements became more generous. In 1990, nine out of ten full-time manual workers were entitled to more than four weeks of paid holiday a year, while twenty years previously; only two-thirds had been allowed three weeks or more. The post-war period also witnessed significant improvements in housing conditions. In 1960, 14% of British households had no indoor toilet, while in 1967; 22% of all homes had no basic hot water supply. By the 1990s, however almost all homes had these amenities together with central heating.

==== Troubles of 1970s and after ====
===== Deindustrialisation =====
After 1973 Britain experienced considerable deindustrialisation, especially in both heavy industry (such as mining and steel) and light manufacturing. New jobs appeared with either low wages, or with high skill requirements that the laid-off workers lacked. Jim Tomlinson agrees that deindustrialisation is a major phenomenon but argues that it represents a stepping stone in the country's economic development rather than decline or failure.

After 1960, British industries were troubled, a phenomenon sometimes known as the "British Disease". The railways were decrepit, more textile mills closed than opened, steel employment fell sharply and the automotive industry practically disappeared, apart from some luxury models. Deindustrialisation meant the closure of many operations in mining, heavy industry and manufacturing, with the resulting loss of high paid working-class jobs. A certain amount of turnover had always taken place, with newer businesses replacing older ones. However, the 1970s were different, with a worldwide energy crisis and a dramatic influx of low-cost manufactured goods from Asia leading to more closures and fewer openings. Major sectors were hit hard between 1966 and 1982, with a 60% decline in textiles, 53% in metal manufacture, 43% in mining, 38% in construction, and 35% in vehicles.

Coal mining quickly collapsed and practically disappeared in the 21st century. The consumption of coal, mostly for electricity—fell from 157,000,000 tonnes in 1970 to 37,000,000 tonnes in 2015, nearly all of it imported. Coal mining jobs fell from a peak of 1,191,000 in 1920 to 695,000 in 1956, 247,000 in 1976, 44,000 in 1993 to 2,000 in 2015. In the 1970s, manufacturing accounted for 25% of the economy. Total employment in manufacturing fell from 7.1 million in 1979 to 4.5 million in 1992 and only 2.7 million in 2016, when it accounted for 10% of the economy.

In Scotland, deindustrialisation took place rapidly in the 1970s and 1980s, as most of the traditional industries drastically shrank or completely closed. A new service-oriented economy emerged to replace them. In 1954, Scottish shipyards built 12% of the world's tonnage, falling to 1% in 1968. North Sea oil created a major new industry after 1970, and some older firms successfully took advantage of the opportunity. John Brown & Company's shipyard at Clydebank transformed itself from a traditional shipbuilding business to a factor in the high technology offshore oil and gas drilling industry.

Popular response varied. According to economic sociologist Jacqueline O'Reilly, the political reverberations of deindustrialisation contributed towards a rise in support for UKIP among voters in former industrial areas, and eventually came to a head in the vote in favour of the UK leaving the EU at the EU referendum on 23 June 2016. Historian Tom Devine has argued that the experience of deindustrialisation had a particular impact on trust in the Conservative party among residents of Scotland and pushed political attitudes in a more left-wing, economically interventionist direction contributing to support for Scottish Independence in the 21st Century.

==== Economic policies and patterns in the 1980s and 1990s ====
Thatcher's deregulation of the economy ended the post-war consensus about the planned economy. She was elected during a period of crises between the Labour Party and the trade unions, and an increasing trend of higher unemployment and deindustrialisation. She liberalised the City of London and privatised state-owned enterprises. Inflation fell and trade union influence was significantly reduced.

The National Union of Mineworkers (NUM) had for a long time, been one of the strongest trade unions. Its strikes had toppled the Heath ministry at the February 1974 general election. Thatcher drew the line and defeated it at the bitterly fought miners' strike of 1984–1985. The basic problem was that the easy coal had all been mined and what was left was expensive and uneconomical. The miners were fighting not just for higher wages, but for a way of life that, to continue, had to be subsidised by other workers. The Union split. In the end, almost all the coal mines were shut down. Britain turned to its vast reserves of North Sea gas and oil, which brought in substantial tax and export revenues, to fuel a new economic boom.

Following the economic boom of the 1980s, a brief but severe recession occurred between 1990 and 1992, mostly under the ministry of John Major; who succeeded Thatcher as prime minister and Conservative Party leader in November 1990. The pound was ejected from the European Exchange Rate Mechanism on Black Wednesday in September 1992, an event which was humiliating for the Conservative government but which helped boost the recovery.

The rest of the 1990s saw a period of continuous economic growth that lasted over sixteen years and was greatly expanded under Blair's New Labour government following his landslide election victory at 1997 general election, with a rejuvenated Labour Party abandoning its commitment to old policies like nuclear disarmament and nationalisation of key industries, and no reversal of the Thatcher-led union reforms. Many traditional Labour supporters were unhappy with Blair abandoning socialism and the restructuring of Clause IV in 1995; effectively tearing up the constitution which had put socialist values and common ownership of industry at the heart of party policy for nearly eighty years. Blair promoted the Labour Party as "New Labour", a social democratic centrist party for the 21st century which promised to inject new life into Britain; with investment in education made a key priority.

== Since 1997 ==
=== Tony Blair and New Labour ===
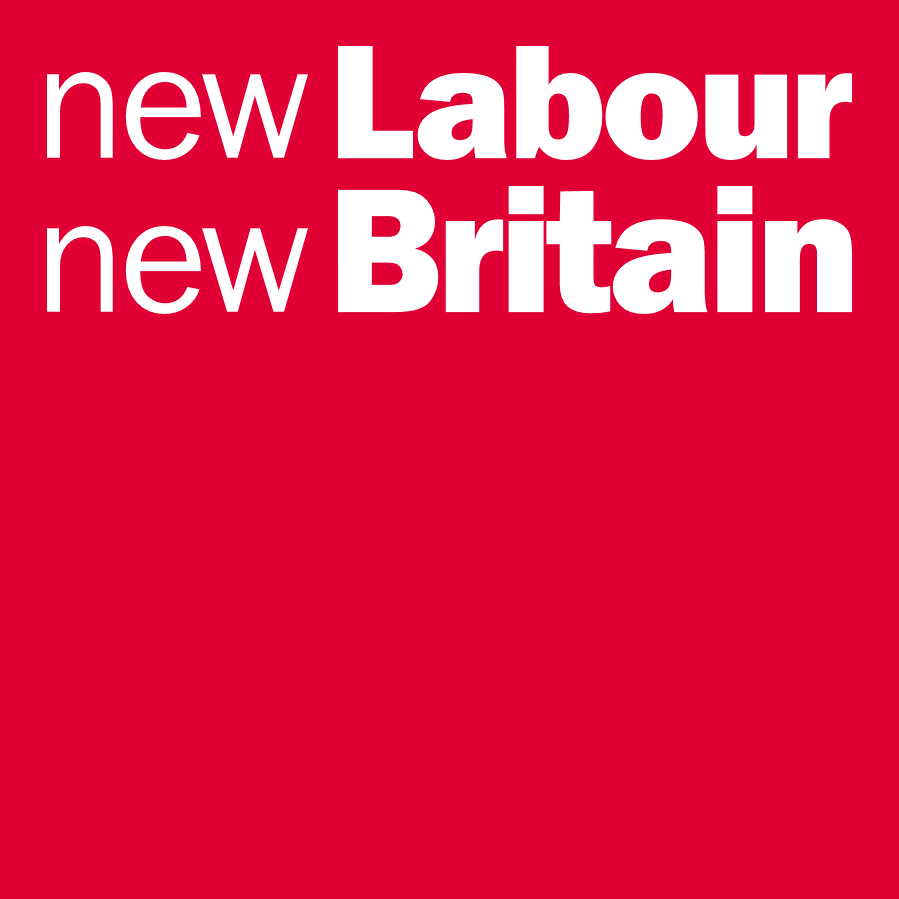
During the 1990s, The Labour Party, Britain's main left-leaning political party, rebranded itself 'New Labour' before achieving a landslide victory in the 1997 general election and governing on a broadly centrist programme for 13 years.

Tony Blair became the Leader of the Labour Party in 1994, and served as prime minister from 1997 to 2007. With Gordon Brown, he founded the movement known as New Labour. In domestic policy, Blair sought to modernise Britain's public services, encourage enterprise and innovation in its private sector and keep the economy open to international commerce. The Northern Irish, Scottish and Welsh devolutions took place under his premiership.

Kavanagh argues that by the 1980s, left-wing or socialist tendencies in the Labour Party divided the party and united its enemies:

Labour voters are not attracted by many "socialist" policies, that is greater public ownership, comprehensive education, extending trade union rights, and redistribution. Such policies appear to unite supporters of other parties in rejection well serving to divide Labour voters.

Blair moved the Labour Party in new directions, minimising the left-wing or socialist factions. He thereby broadened the appeal to professionals and middle-class voters in "Middle England", who had traditionally voted Conservative.

Blair was also anxious to escape from the Labour Party's reputation for "tax-and-spend" domestic policies; he wanted instead to establish a reputation for fiscal prudence. He had undertaken in general terms measures to modernise the welfare state, but he had avoided undertaking measures to reduce poverty, achieve full employment, or reverse the increase in inequality that had occurred during the Thatcher years. Once in office, however, his government launched a package of social policies designed to reduce unemployment and poverty. The commitment to modernise the welfare state was tackled by the introduction of "welfare to work" programmes to motivate the unemployed to return to work instead of drawing benefit. Poverty reduction programmes were targeted at specific groups, including children and the elderly, and took the form of what were termed "New Deals".

There were also new Tax Credit allowances for low-income and single-parent families with children, and "Sure Start" programmes for under-fours in deprived areas. A "National Strategy for Neighbourhood Renewal" was launched in 2001 with the objective of ensuring that "within 10 to 20 years no-one should be seriously disadvantaged by where they live"; a "Social Exclusion Unit" was set up, and annual progress reports concerning the reduction of poverty and social exclusion were commissioned.

Chancellor of the Exchequer Gordon Brown replaced Blair as Prime Minister in 2007. Labour's popularity declined further with the onset of a worldwide recession in 2008, where the Conservatives led by David Cameron overtook Labour in the polls for the first time in many years. In Scotland, the SNP and Lib Dems managed to win seats from Labour at by-elections in a further blow to the government. Arguably, the controversial decision for the UK to support the invasion of Iraq in 2003 sparked the beginning of Labour's decline in popularity; as their majority was significantly reduced at the 2005 general election. Five years later, Labour lost 91 seats in the House of Commons at the 2010 general election, the party's biggest loss of seats at a single general election since 1931. On 11 May 2010, Brown was succeeded as prime minister by David Cameron of the Conservative Party, and resigned as Leader of the Labour Party on the same day after nearly three years. The 2010 election was seen as marking the end of the "New Labour" era both in the country at large and the Labour Party with all candidates in the subsequent leadership election keen to separate themselves from the movement. Ed Miliband was elected as the new Labour leader on 25 September.

=== Conservatives return ===
The economic damage done by the Great Recession weakened Labour's image and facilitated a Conservative comeback after thirteen years in opposition. Since his election as Conservative Party leader in 2005, David Cameron sought to rebrand the Conservatives, embracing an increasingly socially liberal position; as opposed to the socially conservative values the party traditionally advocated. The 2010 general election resulted in a hung parliament, the first in 36 years; and led to Cameron becoming prime minister as the head of a coalition government with the centrist Liberal Democrats. His premiership was marked by the ongoing negative economic effects of the late 2000s worldwide financial crisis. He faced a large deficit in government finances that he sought to reduce through austerity measures. His government introduced large-scale changes to welfare, immigration policy, education, and healthcare.

Cameron's government privatised the Royal Mail and some other state assets, and legalised same-sex marriage in July 2013. He was re-elected in 2015, with 330 seats in the House of Commons; enabling him to form a majority government. This result was unexpected, as another hung parliament was predicted by most major polls. Cameron formed the first Conservative majority government since 1992, while Labour lost nearly all its Scottish seats to the SNP in the aftermath of the Scottish independence referendum and Miliband resigned as party leader. This unexpected result gave the governing Conservatives a mandate to renegotiate the terms of the UK's membership of the European Union during the autumn and winter of 2015–16 which was concluded in February 2016 and was then followed by a national referendum on the United Kingdom's continued membership to the European Union itself which was held on 23 June 2016.

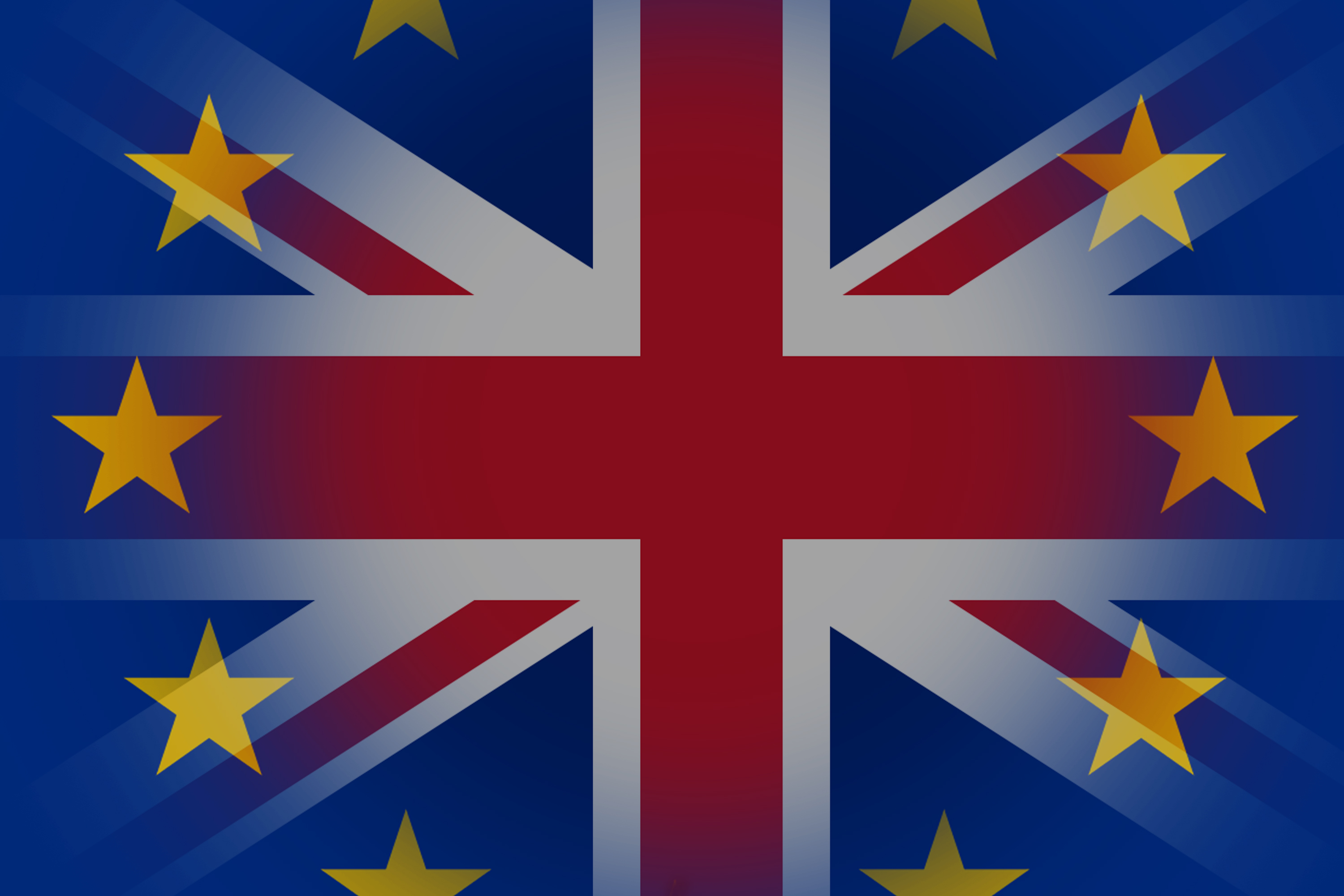
The UK's relationship with the EU dominated British political debate in the second half of the 2010s.

On the morning of Friday 24 June 2016, when the results of the EU referendum were announced, Cameron announced his intention to step down as prime minister and Leader of Conservative Party at the Conservative Party conference in the autumn of that year following the British electorate's vote to Leave the European Union in a nationwide referendum; his government having campaigned for a "Remain" vote. He resigned earlier than intended on 13 July 2016, and was succeeded by former Home Secretary Theresa May, who called another general election for 8 June 2017, resulting in a hung parliament. The Labour Party, now under the leadership of Jeremy Corbyn, made a net gain of seats for the first time in 20 years, and 30 new seats were gained by Labour overall; 6 of which were in Scotland. Notably, Canterbury and Kensington had never returned Labour MPs to Parliament before, but both were narrowly gained at the expense of the Conservative Party. There was a 9.6% swing from Conservative to Labour, which was the largest swing from one party to another since 1945.

The Liberal Democrat's former party leader and Deputy Prime Minister Nick Clegg lost his Sheffield Hallam seat to Labour, and former Secretary of State for Business Sir Vince Cable regained the Twickenham seat from the Conservatives two years previously. Cable succeeded Tim Farron as Lib Dem leader after the election, and three new seats were gained for the party in Scotland. UKIP led by Paul Nuttall made no gains and lost the majority of its previous supporters to the Labour and Conservative parties; signifying an end to multi-party politics and a return to two-party politics. Nuttall stood at Boston and Skegness, which was the constituency with the highest vote to leave the EU at the referendum. However, Nuttall finished in third place and resigned as UKIP leader. The Conservatives remained in power and Theresa May remained as prime minister through a confidence and supply agreement made with the Northern Irish Democratic Unionist Party.

The next couple of years were defined by political instability as the government attempted to conduct the process of withdrawing the United Kingdom from the EU in the context of a hung parliament. Both Theresa May and her successor Boris Johnson failed to reach a consensus in Parliament for leaving the EU in a way they wished, eventually resulting in another general election in late 2019. At this election, the Conservatives made a net gain of 48 seats and were returned with the largest majority for a governing party since 2001 in what was regarded as a landslide victory, winning 43.6% of the vote (the highest share for any party since 1979) and 365 seats (the highest number for the party since 1987). Labour made a net loss of 60 seats, losing several of its constituencies in northern England, across the Midlands and Wales to the Conservatives in what was widely referred to as a collapse of the Red Wall. The SNP made a net gain of 13 seats across Scotland, winning 45% of the Scottish vote and 48 of the 59 Scottish seats. In Northern Ireland, more Irish Nationalist MPs were elected than British Unionists for the first time, although unionist parties still won more votes. After the Conservative victory, Parliament ratified the EU withdrawal agreement that Johnson had negotiated and the UK left the EU at the end of January the following year.

Early in 2020, the coronavirus pandemic spread to the United Kingdom. The attempt to combat the disease led to disruptions in everyday life on a scale not seen since World War II, including closures of schools and other educational institutions, shops selling non-essential goods and most public facilities for eating, entertainment and leisure, as well as cancellations of events and restrictions on people's rights to gather in public places and leave their homes.

== Economic growth and crises since 1995 ==
=== Housing ===
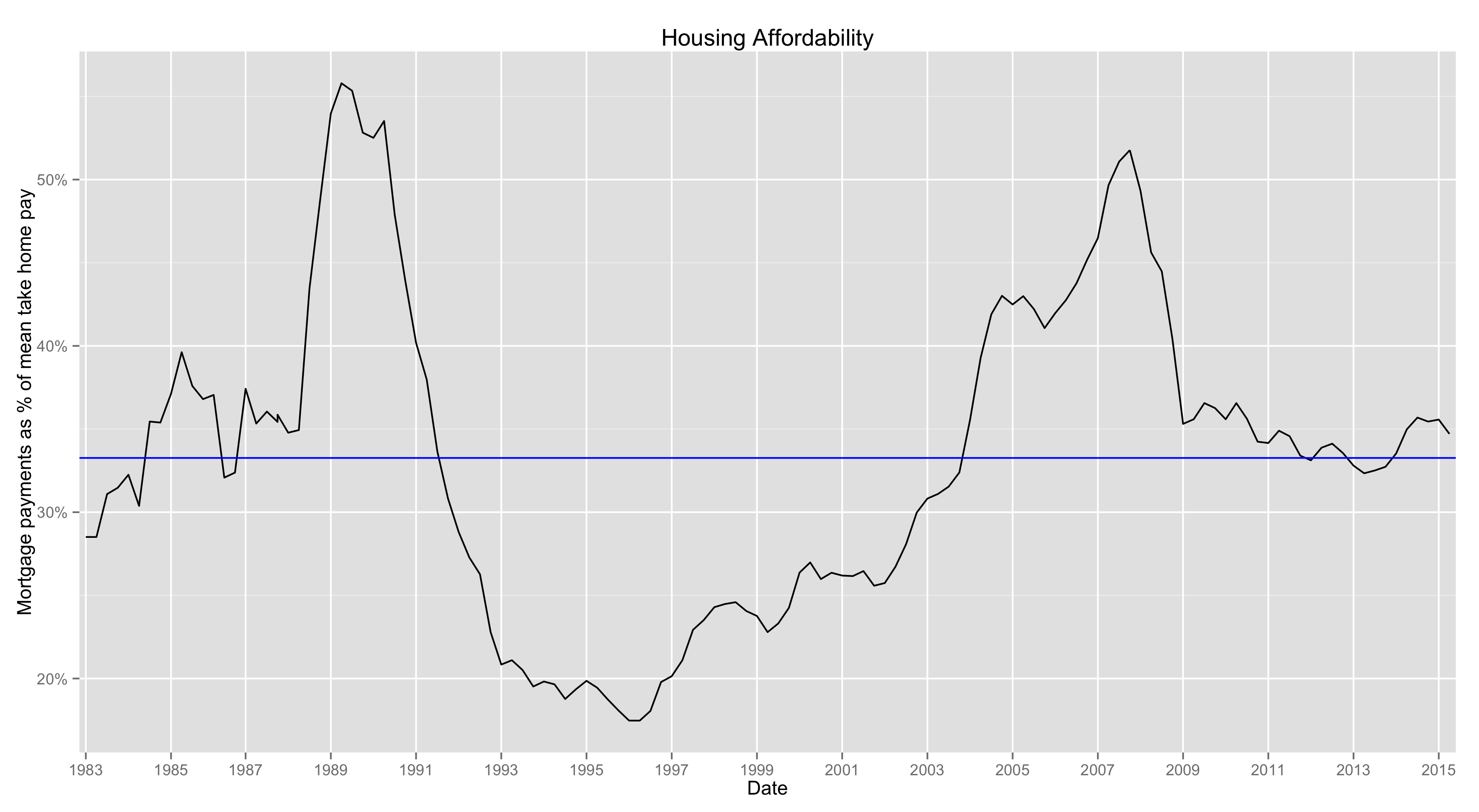
United Kingdom housing affordability as described by mortgage payments as a percentage of take home pay from 1983 to 2015

House prices tripled in the 20 years between 1995 and 2015. Growth was almost continuous during the period, save for a two-year period of decline around 2008 as a result of the banking crisis. The gap between income and house prices has changed in the last 20 years such that even in the most affordable regions of England and Wales buyers have to spend six times their income. It was most marked in London, where in 2013 the £300,000 median house price cost 12 times the median London income of £24,600.

=== Brexit ===
Economic and social issues caused political unrest, particularly in areas hurt by deindustrialization and globalization of the economy. The UK Independence Party (UKIP), a Eurosceptic political party, was founded in 1993. It rose to prominence after 2000, winning third place in the 2004 European elections, second place in the 2009 European elections and first place in the 2014 European elections, with 27.5% of the total vote. Cameron won reelection in 2015 in part by promising a referendum on the EU, which he expected would defeat Brexit.

The 'Leave' pro-Brexit campaign focused strongly on sovereignty and the need to control migration, whereas the 'Remain' campaign focused on the negative economic impacts of leaving the EU. Polls showed more cited both the EU (32%) and migration (48%) as important issues than cited the economy (27%). By 2018 as the complexities of leaving the EU dominated political discussions, economists produced gloomy projections of the damage to the British economy.

=== Diana, Princess of Wales ===
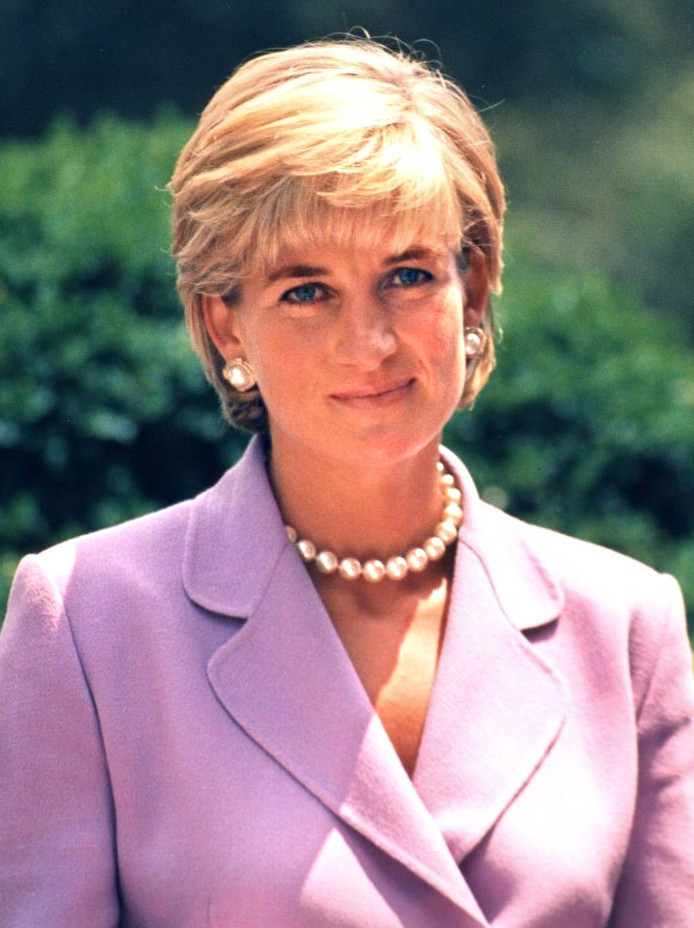
Diana, Princess of Wales was married to Prince Charles from 1981 to 1996. She died in a car accident in 1997.

During the summer of 1981, the nation's spirits were raised by the wedding of Prince Charles and Lady Diana Spencer. The ceremony reached a global TV audience of 750 million people. It restored the royal family to the headlines where they would become a permanent fixture in tabloids and celebrity gossip publications, as well as a major tourist attraction. Diana became what Tony Blair later called the "People's Princess", an iconic national figure, rivalling or surpassing the Queen, until her divorce. Her accidental death brought an unprecedented spasm of grief and mourning. Her brother, the 9th Earl Spencer, captured her role:

Diana was the very essence of compassion, of duty, of style, of beauty. All over the world she was a symbol of selfless humanity. All over the world, a standard bearer for the rights of the truly downtrodden, a very British girl who transcended nationality. Someone with a natural nobility who was classless and who proved in the last year that she needed no royal title to continue to generate her particular brand of magic.

=== Religion ===
==== Secularisation ====
Brian Harrison reports that the forces of secularisation grew rapidly, and by the 1990s Britain was an unusually secular society by the standards of Western Europe. Standing at the lower end of attendance at religious services, and near the top in people claiming "no religion". While 80% of Britons in 1950 said they were Christians, only 64% did so in 2000. Harrison states:

By every measure (number of churches, number of parish clergy, church attendance, Easter Day communicants, number of church marriages, membership as a proportion of the adult population) the Church of England was in decline after 1970. In 1985 there were only half as many parish clergy as in 1900.

Roman Catholicism held up, thanks initially to immigration from Ireland and later from Poland. What had been tiny clusters of Jews, Muslims, Hindus, Buddhists, and Sikhs grew enormously through immigration.

Research conducted by the polling organisation YouGov in 2020 suggested that whilst a majority of Britons described the UK as a Christian country and most celebrated the traditionally Christian festivals of Christmas and Easter, 55% said they did not belong to any religion. However, this poll did not include any residents of Northern Ireland, which is generally considered the most religious part of the UK.

==== Growth trends ====
Population of religious groups in Britain	1970	1993
Jews	450,000	300,000
Muslim	250,000	1,000,000
Sikh	75,000	300,000
Hindu	50,000	320,000
Buddhist	6,000	25,000

The Muslim population of England and Wales was over 50 times larger in 2011 compared to 50 years before. Sophie Gilliat-Ray attributes the growth to "recent immigration, the growing birth rate, some conversion to Islam, and perhaps also an increased willingness to self-identify as 'Muslim' on account of the 'war on terror'".

Census year	Number of Muslims	Population of England & Wales	% of population	Registered mosques
1961	50,000	46,196,000	0.11%	7
1971	226,000	49,152,000	0.46%	30
1981	553,000	49,634,000	1.11%	149
1991	950,000	51,099,000	1.86%	443
2001	1,600,000	52,042,000	3.07%	614
2011	2,706,000	56,076,000	4.83%	1,500

=== Football ===
Throughout this period association football, generally referred to as football, was the most popular sport in the UK. The four nations of the UK retained the separate national teams and league systems that they had had since the early days of the sport's codification.

The rise of football hooliganism, which had started to come to prominence in the 1970s, continued to mar the game into the 1980s and reached a nadir in the Heysel Stadium disaster, when Liverpool fans hooliganism, combined with poor policing and infrastructure, led to the deaths of 39 Juventus fans before the European Cup final, in May 1985. This resulted in English clubs being banned from European competitions for five years. Welsh clubs playing in the English league system, who could qualify for the European Cup Winners' Cup via the Welsh Cup, were unaffected by the ban, as were clubs from Scotland and Northern Ireland.

Attendances at professional matches dropped during the beginning of this period, with blame pointed not only at increasing hooliganism, but also the deteriorating state of many stadiums. Despite the Guide to Safety at Sports Grounds being published in 1973, following the 1971 Ibrox disaster, safety standards at many football grounds were poor, culminating in the Bradford City stadium fire in 1985 and the Hillsborough disaster in 1989, in which 56 and 96 people, respectively, were killed as a consequence of poor stadium safety. Recommendations from the subsequent Taylor Report were acted upon, and eventually all top-flight stadiums in England, Scotland, and Wales became all-seated.

The structure of league football in England was radically altered in 1992 when the clubs of the Football League First Division resigned en masse in 1992 to form the Premier League, which became the new top division in England. The new league assigned TV rights to Sky TV as a revenue-raising exercise, which was a relatively new concept in the UK. These domestic rights issues were followed in time with a succession of international rights packages and the Premier League became the most watched football league in the world. In Scotland, a similar split occurred in 1998 when the Scottish Premier Division split to form the Scottish Premier League. It was abolished in 2013, when it re-merged with the Scottish Football League merged to form the Scottish Professional Football League.

Prior to 1992 there was no national league in Wales, just a cup competition, and many of the nation's best clubs played in the English league system. The League of Wales was formed to remedy this and, as of 2020 and renamed Cymru Premier, is now the top division of a full national league system. In 2003, the Irish Football Association took direct charge of Northern Ireland's top flight with the creation of the Irish Premier League, splitting from the Irish Football League.

=== Other sports ===
Cricket is England's other historic sport, but it grew faster in popularity in the overseas colonies, and immigrants in increasing numbers comprised the ranks of top players and fan base. Tennis spread from upper-class estates into tennis clubs in middle-class suburbs, where it became a woman's specialty. Women increasingly frequented gyms, which sprang up everywhere; by the mid-1990s, one in six members were women. Middle-class men and women were usually more active than working-class people were. Scotland, the birthplace of golf, remains the top destination for the sport; many clubs opened up by 1910 and continue to operate to the present day. The total number of golfers reached the 2.5 million mark by 2000.

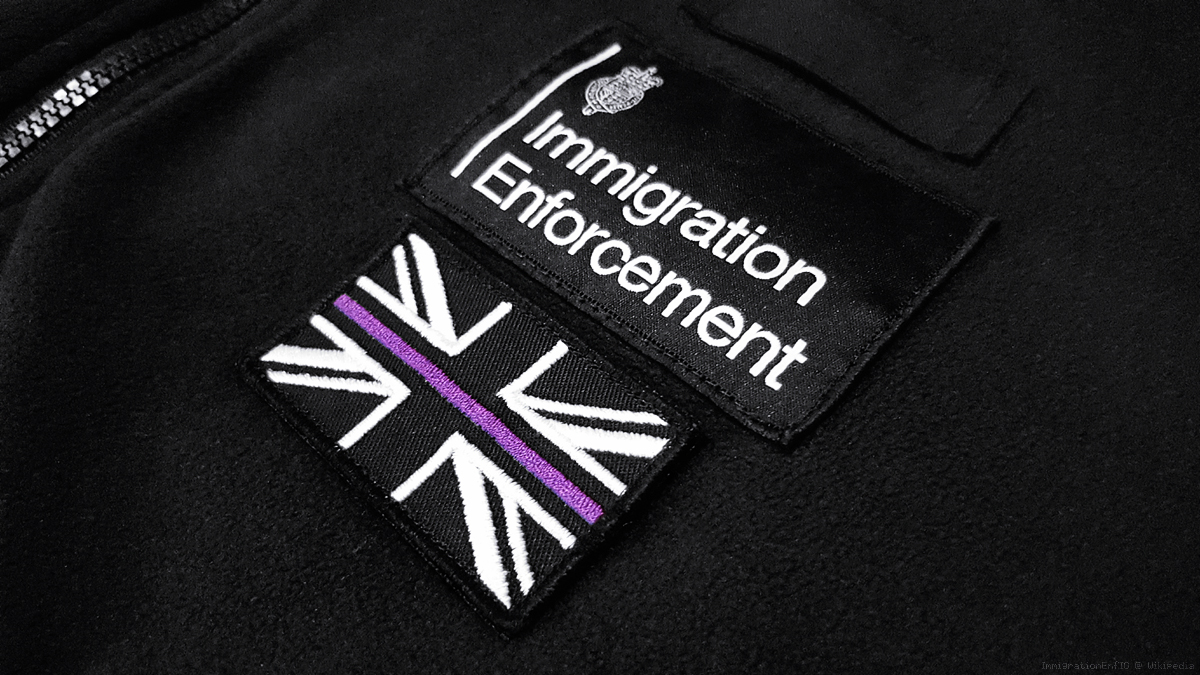
Immigration was often a topic of great controversy and debate in the early 21st century and widely considered to be one of the main contributing factors to the UK's 2016 vote to leave the EU.

=== Immigration ===
Whilst in the second half of the 20th century most immigrants to the UK arrived from the former British empire in the early 21st century large numbers arrived from Europe and the Middle East. The UK population was recorded as 56,267,000 people in 1996, out of which 52,942,000 were White. The other 3,307,000 represented diverse ethnic or racial origins: 875,000 were Black; 1,639,000 were Indian, Pakistani or Bangladeshi; 126,000 were Chinese; 161,000 were Other Asian; 506,000 were from other groups or were of mixed-race origin.

Some immigrants came to the UK as asylum seekers, seeking protection as refugees under the United Nations 1951 Refugee Convention, or from member states of the European Union, exercising one of the European Union's Four Freedoms. Since the 1980s, however, the UK has become a leading proponent of European restrictionalism and has developed policies that tend to exclude asylum seekers from mainstream society. Dispersal policy was set up through the National Asylum Support Service programme so that asylum seekers were directed to urban areas that had available housing, although possibly because of a weak job market. While newly arrived asylum seekers and refugees had both skills and qualifications, they experienced high levels of unemployment, or else found mostly low-skilled jobs with low pay. Public opinion in host areas turned against them.

=== Devolution ===
On 11 September 1997 (the seven-hundredth anniversary of the Scottish victory over the English at the Battle of Stirling Bridge) a referendum was held on devolving substantial power to a Scottish Parliament. Voters overwhelmingly voted to establish a Scottish parliament and grant it limited taxation powers. Two weeks later, a referendum on establishing a Welsh Assembly was also approved, by a narrow majority. The first elections were held, and these bodies began to operate, in 1999. Devolution was reintroduced to Northern Ireland at a similar time via the Good Friday agreement. The creation of these bodies widened geographic differences, especially in areas such as healthcare.

New Labour also began a programme of devolution in England creating a London Mayorship and Assembly via referendums in 1998 and passing the Local Government Act 2000 which allowed English and Welsh local government's to hold referendums on introducing directly elected mayors in their areas. Though the Conservatives had historically been considered more critical of devolution than their Labour counterparts, this process continued after their return to government in 2010.

== See also ==
- Music of the United Kingdom (1980s)
- Music of the United Kingdom (1990s)
- Music of the United Kingdom (2000s and 2010s)
- History of public health in the United Kingdom
