= Keith Kelsall =

Scottish sociologist & academic (1910-1996)

Roger Keith Kelsall (23 January 1910 – 1 May 1996), commonly known by his middle name Keith, was a Scottish sociologist and academic. He held the first Chair in Sociological Studies at the University of Sheffield from 1960 to 1975.

== Life ==
Roger Keith Kelsall was born at Milngavie in Scotland on 23 January 1910, the son of a Scottish civil engineer and his English wife. He attended Kelvinside Academy, then the University of Glasgow where he studied history and political economy. After briefly working for the Distribution Society and as a tutor at Bonar Law College, Kelsall was appointed an assistant lecturer at Hull University College in about 1935. In 1942, he moved to the new Ministry of Town and Country Planning; after the Second World War, he worked under David Glass at the London School of Economics on Glass's study of social mobility. In 1951, Kelsall was involved in the establishment of the British Sociological Association; in 1956, he joined the University of Sheffield as head of the School of Social Studies, which then ran non-graduate social studies programmes. The School became the Department of Sociological Studies in 1960, and Kelsall was appointed to the university's first Chair of Sociological Studies; he and Peter H. Mann (who had been lecturer at the School since 1951) were instrumental in establishing the department and introducing an honours degree course in sociology. He retired in 1975. After many years of service to the British Sociological Association (including as chairman from 1964 to 1966), Kelsall became its president, serving from 1977 to 1979.

Kelsall's research focused on demography, industrial relations, social mobility, social stratification, and access to education and the professions. In retirement, he also took an interest in Scottish social history and antique glassware. Kelsall died on 1 May 1996; since 1934, he had been married to the educationalist Helen (née Lightbody), with whom he had a son and co-authored a number of books.

== Publications ==
- (Co-authored with Theodor Plaut) Industrial Relations in the Modern State: An Introductory Survey (Methuen, 1937).
- Wage Regulation under the Statute of Artificers (Methuen, 1938).
- Higher Civil Servants in Britain: From 1870 to the Present Day (Routledge and Paul, 1955).
- Report of an Inquiry into Applications for Admission to Universities (Association of Universities of the British Commonwealth, 1957).
- Sociological Research in Britain, Inaugural Lecture, 30 November 1960 (University of Sheffield, 1961).
- Women and Teaching: Report on an Independent Nuffield Survey Following-up a Large National Sample of Women who Entered Teaching in England and Wales at Various Dates Pre-war and Post-war (HMSO, 1963).
- Population (Longman, 1967; 2nd edition, 1972).
- (Co-authored with Walter E. Minchinton and R. H. Tawney) Wage Regulation in Pre-Industrial England (David & Charles, 1972).
- (Co-authored with Helen M. Kelsall) The School Teacher in England and the United States (Pergamon, 1969).
- (Co-authored with Anne Poole and Annette Kuhn) Six Years After: First Report on a National Follow-up Survey of Ten Thousand Graduates of British Universities in 1960 (University of Sheffield, 1970).
- (Co-authored with Helen M. Kelsall) Social Disadvantage and Educational Opportunity (Holt, Rinehart and Winston, 1971).
- (Co-authored with Anne Poole and Annette Kuhn) Graduates: The Sociology of an Elite (Methuen, 1971).
- (Co-authored with Helen M. Kelsall) Stratification: An Essay on Class and Inequality (Longman, 1974).
- Scottish Lifestyle 300 Years Ago (Scottish Cultural Press, 1986).
- Population in Britain in the 1990s and Beyond (Trentham, 1989).
- Glass in Eighteenth-Century England: The Open-Flame Lamp (1995).

Academic offices
Preceded by Ellinor Black	Head, School of Social Studies, University of Sheffield; 1956–1960	Succeeded by Himself; As Chair in Sociological Studies
Preceded by None	Chair in Sociological Studies, University of Sheffield; 1960–1975	Succeeded by John Westergaard
Preceded by Sheila Allen	President, British Sociological Association; 1977–1979	Succeeded by John Eldridge
