= The British disease =

1970s economic stagnation in the United Kingdom

In economics, British disease is a derogatory term to describe the period of economic stagnation in the United Kingdom in the 1970s at the time the country was widely described as the "sick man of Europe". It was characterised by rates of capital investment and labour productivity which lagged behind continental Europe, as well as strained industrial relations. The term relates to a lack of social vitality during industrial disputes in the 1970s.

A lack of productivity of the UK economy was one factor behind Margaret Thatcher's economic reforms.

== See also ==
- Accession of the United Kingdom to the European Communities (1973)
- Dutch disease
- Labour government, 1974–1979
- Social history of Postwar Britain (1945–1979)
- Thatcherism
- Winter of Discontent
