= Eric Sainsbury =

English social work teacher, researcher and academic

Eric Edward Sainsbury, OBE, JP (16 December 1925 – 11 March 2014) was an English social work teacher, researcher and academic. He was Chair in Social Administration at the University of Sheffield from 1977 to 1988.

== Life ==
Eric Edward Sainsbury was born on 16 December 1925 in Newham where his father was a wage clerk. He grew up at Leigh‑on-Sea, Essex, and at Formby in Lancashire, as the family moved with his father's work. After attending high school in Southport, he volunteered for the Royal Air Force during the Second World War but was sent to the Barnburgh colliery as a Bevin Boy. After nearly four years there, he won a place at Balliol College, Oxford, to read English. He then taught at Leigh-on-Sea for three years, and then returned to education to complete postgraduate certificates at the University of Sheffield and the London School of Economics, awarded in 1955 and 1956 respectively. He then worked as a probation officer, before returning to Sheffield as a tutor in social work in 1961; five years later, he was appointed to a lectureship in social administration, and was promoted to senior lecturer in 1973 and then to the new Chair in Social Administration in 1977. Five years later, he became Head of the Department of Sociological Studies, serving until 1985. He worked with John Westergaard (Chair in Sociological Studies) to "develop Social Policy as an intellectual bridge between Sociology and Social Work"; this led to the establishment of a social policy honours course in the department. Amid departmental funding cuts and declining student numbers, Sainsbury took early retirement in 1988 to ensure that more junior staff did not lose their jobs; Westergaard had done the same two years earlier.

Sainsbury's research focused on user-centred social work; he advocated for social workers to listen and take account of individual user's desires and needs. He also wrote about the welfare state, mental health and disadvantaged children.

Outside of academia, Sainsbury sat on the Home Office's Advisory Council on Child Care and the Central Council for Education and Training in Social Work; he was an adviser to the Department of Health's Chief Scientist, and was a magistrate. He was appointed an Officer of the Order of the British Empire in 1996 for community service in Sheffield, and received honorary degrees from Birmingham City University and Sheffield Hallam University. Sainsbury was also a keen piano player. He died on 11 March 2014, and was survived by his wife Audrey; their son Julian had died in 2007.

== Publications ==
- Social Diagnosis in Case Work (Routledge and Kegan Paul, 1970).
- Social Work with Families: Perceptions of Social Casework Among Clients of a Family Service Unit (Routledge and Kegan Paul, 1975)
- The Personal Social Services (Pitman, 1977)
- Social Work in Focus: Clients' and Social Workers' Perspectives on Long-Term Social Work (Routledge and Kegan Paul, 1982).
- (Co-authored with Mike Fisher) Mental Health Social Work Observed (Allen & Unwin, 1984).
- Working with Children in Need: Studies in Complexity and Challenge (Jessica Kingsley Publishers, 1994).
- (Co-authored with Jacki Pritchard) Can You Read Me?: Creative Writing with Child and Adult Victims of Abuse (Jessica Kingsley Publishers, 2004).
