= Alan Walker (social scientist) =

British academic, social scientist and public health administrator

Alan Christopher Walker, CBE, FBA, FRSA, FAcSS (born 20 April 1949) is a British academic, social scientist and public health administrator. Since 1985, he has been Professor of Social Policy and Social Gerontology at the University of Sheffield.

== Career ==
Alan Christopher Walker was born on 20 April 1949. He attended the University of Essex, graduating with a Bachelor of Arts degree in government and sociology in 1972. After completing his degree, he worked at the university for three years as a research assistant and latterly as a research officer. He was then a senior research officer at the National Children's Bureau before joining the University of Sheffield to take up a lectureship in 1977. Promotions followed to a senior lectureship in 1983 and a readership the next year, before he was appointed to his current position as Professor of Social Policy and Social Gerontology in 1985. He was Head of the Department of Sociological Studies at Sheffield from 1988 to 1996, and directed the Economic and Social Research Council's "Growing Older Programme" from 1999 to 2004. He has also held visiting professorships in Canada, Hong Kong, Israel and Japan. According to his British Academy profile, Walker's research focuses on "social policy and social gerontology including political economy, comparative research in Europe and East Asia, and the theory and application of social quality".

Walker has also served as a public health administrator in his capacity as chairman of the Community Health Sheffield NHS Trust from 1999 to 2003, when he became chair of the Sheffield Care Trust; he then chaired the Sheffield Health and Social Care NHS Trust from 2008 until 2016.

== Awards and honours ==
Walker was founding Academician of the Academy of Social Sciences (later renamed Fellow of the Academy of Social Sciences; FAcSS). He has been a Fellow of the Royal Society of Arts (FRSA) since 1994, and in 2011 he was elected a Fellow of the British Academy (FBA), the United Kingdom's national academy for the humanities and social sciences. He was appointed a Commander of the Order of the British Empire (CBE) in the 2014 Birthday Honours "for services to social sciences". Walker was also awarded a doctor of letters degree (DLitt) by his alma mater in 1990 and received the Queen's Prize for Higher and Further Education in 2002 for his research on ageing, as well as the Lifetime Achievement Award from the Social Policy Association in 2007 and (in the same year) he was the inaugural recipient of the Outstanding Achievement Award from the British Society of Gerontology. In 2006, Hong Kong Baptist University awarded him an honorary doctor of social sciences (DSocSc) degree.
