= André Gorz =

Austrian philosopher (1923–2007)

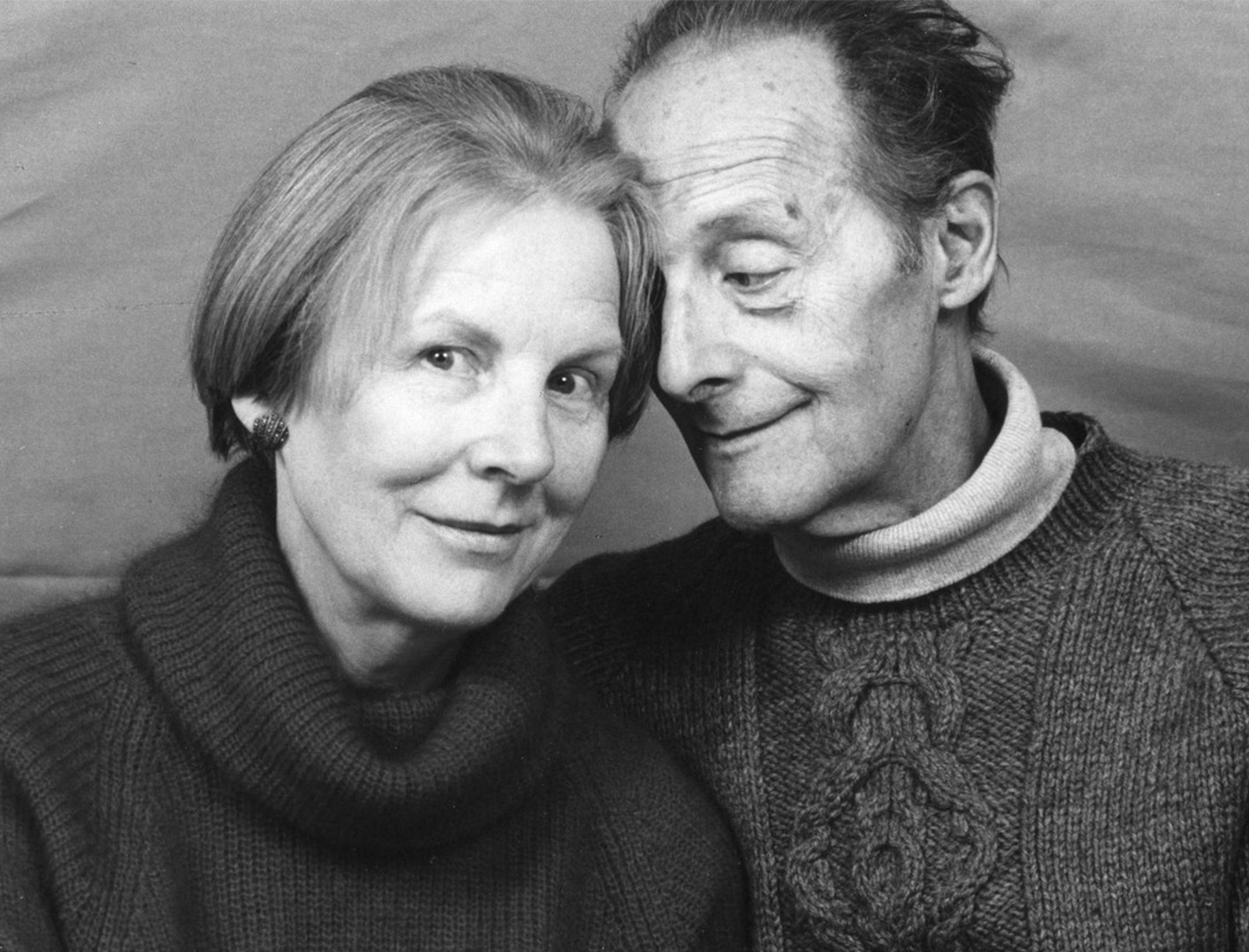
- Gorz (to the right) and his wife, Dorine
- Born: Gerhart Hirsch; 9 February 1923; Vienna, Austria
- Died: 22 September 2007 (aged 84); Vosnon, France
- Other names: Gérard Horst, Michel Bosquet

Philosophical work
- Era: 20th-century philosophy
- Region: Western philosophy
- School: Continental philosophy New Left
- Main interests: Political philosophy
- Notable ideas: Non-reformist reform

Gérard Horst (French: [ʒeʁaʁ ɔʁst]; né Gerhart Hirsch, Austrian German: [ˈɡeːɐ̯hart hɪrʃ]; 9 February 1923 – 22 September 2007), more commonly known by his pen names André Gorz (French: [ɑ̃dʁe ɡɔʁts]) and Michel Bosquet (French: [miʃɛl bɔskɛ]), was an Austrian-French social philosopher and journalist and critic of work. He co-founded Le Nouvel Observateur weekly in 1964. A supporter of Jean-Paul Sartre's existentialist version of Marxism after World War II, he became more concerned with political ecology in the aftermath of the May 68 student riots.

In the 1960s and 1970s, he was a main theorist in the New Left movement and coined the concept of non-reformist reform. His central theme was wage labour issues such as liberation from work, the just distribution of work, social alienation, and a guaranteed basic income.

== Early life ==
Born in Vienna as Gerhart Hirsch, he was the son of a Jewish wood-salesman and a Catholic mother, who came from a cultivated background and worked as a secretary. Although his parents did not have any strong sense of national or religious identity, the rising anti-Semitism led his father to convert to Catholicism in 1930. At the outbreak of World War II in 1939, his mother sent him to an institution in Switzerland to avoid his mobilization into the Wehrmacht. Thereafter, Hirsch was a stateless person until 12 April 1957, when he became naturalized as French citizen because of Pierre Mendès-France's support. He graduated from the École polytechnique at University of Lausanne, now EPFL, in chemical engineering in 1945.

Working at first as a translator of American short stories published by a Swiss editor, he then published his first articles in a co-operative journal. In 1946, he met Jean-Paul Sartre, and they became close. Gorz was then influenced mainly by existentialism and phenomenology. He contributed to the journals Les Temps modernes (Paris), New Left Review, Technologie und Politik (Reinbek). In June 1949, he moved to Paris, where he worked first at the international secretariat of the Mouvement des Citoyens du Monde, then as private secretary of a military attaché of the embassy of India. He then entered Paris-Presse as a journalist and took the pseudonym of Michel Bosquet. There, he met with Jean-Jacques Servan-Schreiber, who in 1955 recruited him as an economist journalist for L'Express.

Alongside his journalistic activities, Gorz worked closely with Sartre and adopted an existentialist approach to Marxism, which led Gorz to emphasize the questions of alienation and of liberation in the framework of existential experience and an analysis of social systems from the viewpoint of individual experience. That intellectual framework formed the basis of his first books, Le Traître (Le Seuil, 1958, prefaced by Sartre), La Morale de l'histoire (Le Seuil, 1959) and the Fondements pour une morale (Galilée, 1977, published fifteen years later), which he signed for the first time as André Gorz, from the German name of the now-Italian city (Görz), where the eyeglasses that were given to his father by the Austrian Army had been made.

== 1960s–1980s ==
Gorz also was a main theorist in the New Left movement, inspired by the young Marx, discussions of humanism and alienation and the liberation of humanity. Gorz was also influenced by the Frankfurt School since he was a friend of Herbert Marcuse. Other friends of his included Rossana Rossanda, founder of Il Manifesto newspaper, the photographer William Klein, younger intellectuals such as Marc Kravetz or Tiennot Grumbach, and Ronald Fraser of the New Left Review.

He strongly criticised structuralism because of its criticisms of the subject and of subjectivity. He called himself a "revolutionary-reformist", a democratic socialist who wanted to see system-changing reforms. In 1961, he entered the editorial committee of Les Temps Modernes and introduced to French thought the Italian Garavini, the neo-Keynesian and communist Bruno Trentin and the anarcho-syndicalist Vittorio Foa. Imposing himself as the "intellectual leader of the 'Italian' tendency of the New Left", he influenced activists of the UNEF students' union and the CFDT (in particular, Jean Auger, Michel Rolant and Fredo Krumnow) as a theorist of workers' self-management, which has been recently embraced by the CFDT. His term "non-reformist reform" refers to proposed programs of change that base their demands on human needs, rather than those of the current economic system.

He directly addressed himself to trade unions in Stratégie ouvrière et néocapitalisme (Le Seuil, 1964) in which he criticized capitalist economic growth and expounded on the various strategies open to trade unions. The same year, he quit L'Express, along with Serge Lafaurie, Jacques-Laurent Bost, K.S. Karol and Jean Daniel, to found Le Nouvel Observateur weekly and used the pseudonym Michel Bosquet.

Deeply affected by May 68, Gorz saw in the events a confirmation of his existential Marxist posture, which joined the students' criticisms towards institutional and state organisations: state, school, family, firm etc. Ivan Illich's ideas on education, medicine and the abolition of wage labour then became the focus of his attention. Gorz published one of Illich's speeches in Les Temps Modernes in 1961 and met him in 1971 in Le Nouvel Observateur at the publishing of Deschooling Society (Une Société sans école). Gorz later published a summary of Illich's Tools for Conviviality (1973) under the title Libérer l'avenir (Free Future). His links with Illich was strengthened after a trip to California in 1974, and he wrote several articles for Le Nouvel Observateur to discuss Illich's thesis.

Gorz's evolution and political and philosophical stances led to some tensions with his colleagues on Les Temps Modernes for which he had assumed the chief editorial responsibilities in 1969. In April 1970, his article Destroy the University (Détruire l'Université) provoked the resignations of Jean-Bertrand Pontalis and Bernard Pingaud. Gorz also criticised a Maoist tendency that had been in the journal since 1971 and supported by Sartre. In 1974, Gorz finally resigned as editor after a disagreement on an article about the Italian autonomist group Lotta Continua. He was also forced to the periphery of Le Nouvel Observateur since he was replaced by more classically oriented economists, and he supported a campaign against nuclear industry to which EDF, the state electricity firm, replied by withdrawing advertisements from the weekly. After it refused to let him publish a special issue on the nuclear issue, he published it in the Que Choisir? consumers' magazine.

Gorz was becoming a leading figure of political ecology, with his ideas being popularised particularly by the ecologist monthly Le Sauvage, which had been founded by Alain Hervé, the founder of the French section of the Friends of the Earth. In 1975, Gorz published Ecologie et politique (Galilée, 1975), which included the essay Ecologie et liberté, "one of the foundational texts of the ecologic problematic".

Gorz was also influenced by Louis Dumont in considering Marxism and liberalism to be two versions of economist thought. Gorz then opposed hedonist individualism and utilitarianism and materialist and productivist collectivism. He supported a humanist version of ecology similar to social ecology that opposes deep ecology. Gorz's ecologism, however, remained linked to a critique of capitalism, as he called for an "ecological, social and cultural revolution that abolishes the constraints of capitalism".

== 1980s–2000s ==
A year before the election of the left's candidate, François Mitterrand, to the French presidency in 1981, Gorz published Adieux au prolétariat (Galilée, 1980 – "Farewell to the Proletariat") in which he criticized the cult of the proletarian class in Marxism. He argued that changes in science and technology had made it impossible for the working class to be the sole or even the main revolutionary agent. Although the book was not well received among the French left, it received attention from younger readers.

Soon after Sartre's death that year, Gorz left the editorial board of Les Temps Modernes. In Les Chemins du paradis (Galilée, 1983) Gorz remained critical of the Marxist orthodoxy of the time, and he used Marx's own analysis in the Grundrisse to argue for the need of the political left to embrace the liberatory potential that the increasing automation of factories and services offered as a central part of the socialist project. In 1983, he fell out with pacifist movements by refusing to oppose the deployment of Pershing II missiles by the United States in West Germany. The same year, he resigned from Le Nouvel Observateur.

In the 1990s and the 2000s, the journals Multitudes and EcoRev published his last article in French, La fin du capitalisme a déjà commencé ("The End of Capitalism Has Already Begun"), and Entropia published his articles.

Gorz also opposed the post-structuralism and the postmodernism of thinkers like Antonio Negri. Gorz's point of view was rooted in the thought of early Marxist humanism. Liberation from wage slavery and social alienation remained some of his goals, even in his later works.

He never became an abstract theorist since his reasoning usually concluded with proposals for how to act to make changes. In Métamorphoses du travail (Galilée, 1988 – "Metamorphosis of Labour"), Gorz argued that capitalism used personal investments from the worker that were not paid back. As such, he became an advocate of a guaranteed basic income independent from work. He made such a proposal in his book, Critique of Economic Reason in 1989 and argued:

"From the point where it takes only 1,000 hours per year or 20,000 to 30,000 hours per lifetime to create an amount of wealth equal to or greater than the amount we create at the present time in 1,600 hours per year or 40,000 to 50,000 hours in a working life, we must all be able to obtain a real income equal to or higher than our current salaries in exchange for a greatly reduced quantity of work. In practice, this means that in the future we must receive our full monthly income every month even if we work full-time only one month in every two or six months in a year or even two years out of four, so as to complete a personal, family or community project, or experiment with different lifestyles, just as we now receive our full salaries during paid holidays, training courses, possibly during periods of sabbatical leave, and so forth...".

He pointed out that in

"contrast to the guaranteed social minimum granted by the state to those unable to find regular paid work, our regular monthly income will be the normal remuneration we have earned by performing the normal amount of labour the economy requires each individual to supply. The fact that the amount of labour required is so low that work can become intermittent and constitute an activity amongst a number of others, should not be an obstacle to its being remunerated by a full monthly income throughout one's life. This income corresponds to the portion of socially produced wealth to which each individual is entitled by virtue to their participation in the social process of production. It is, however, no longer a true salary, since it is not dependent on the amount of labour supplied (in the month or year) and is not intended to remunerate individuals as workers".

== Death ==
Gorz and his wife, Dorine, committed suicide by lethal injection together in their home in Vosnon, Aube. His wife had been diagnosed with a terminal illness, and they had already said that neither wanted to survive the other's death. Their bodies were found on 24 September 2007 by a friend.

His book Lettre à D. Histoire d'un amour (Galilée, 2006) was dedicated to his wife and was in fact a way for him to tell of his love for her.

== Bibliography ==
=== Books ===
- La morale de l'histoire (Seuil, 1959)
- Stratégie ouvrière et néocapitalisme (Seuil, 1964)
- Socialism and Revolution (first published, Seuil, 1967, as Le socialisme difficile)
- Réforme et révolution (Seuil, 1969)
- Critique du capitalisme quotidien (Galilée, 1973)
- Critique de la division du travail (Seuil, 1973. Collective work)
- Ecology as Politics (South End Press, 1979, first published, Galilée, 1978)
- Écologie et liberté (Galilée, 1977)
- Fondements pour une morale (Galilée, 1977)
- The Traitor (1960, first published, Seuil, 1958)
- Farewell to the Working Class (1980 – Galilée, 1980, and Le Seuil, 1981, as Adieux au Prolétariat)
- Paths to Paradise (1985 – Galilée, 1983)
- Critique of Economic Reason (Verso, 1989, first published, Galilée, 1988, as Métamorphoses du travail, quête du sens)
- Capitalism, Socialism, Ecology (1994 – Galilée, 1991)
- Reclaiming Work: Beyond the Wage-Based Society (1999, first published, Galilée 1997 as Misères du présent, richesse du possible)
- The Immaterial: Knowledge, Value and Capital (Seagull Books, 2010, first published, Galilée, 2003)
- Letter to D : A Love Letter (Polity, 2009, first published 2006 – extract on-line)
- Ecologica (Galilée, 2008)
- Le fil rouge de l'écologie. Entretiens inédits en français, Willy Gianinazzi (ed.) (Ed. de l'EHESS, 2015)
- Leur écologie et la nôtre. Anthologie d'écologie politique, Françoise Gollain & Willy Gianinazzi (eds.) (Seuil, 2020)

=== Essays ===
- Willy Gianinazzi, André Gorz: A life, London: Seagull Books, 2022.
- Finn Bowring, André Gorz and the Sartrean Legacy: Arguments for a person-centred social theory, London: MacMillan, 2000.
- Conrad Lodziak, Jeremy Tatman, André Gorz: A critical introduction, London: Pluto Press, 1997.
- The Social Ideology of the Motorcar, Le Sauvage September–October 1973

=== Audio ===
- An hommage to the thought of André Gorz broadcast on France Culture: Philosophie en situations : André Gorz, philosophe d'avenir
- A portrait of André Gorz was broadcast on France Culture on 20 December 2006, on the radio show Surpris par la nuit.

=== Interviews ===
- Interview with Andre Gorz (video in German), 3sat, 5 September 2007
- Entrevistas a Andre Gorz : Clarín y Michel Zlotowski, 1999. Traducción de Cristina Sardoy (in Spanish) – Les périphériques vous parlent, printemps 1998 (in French)

=== Documentary ===
- Charline Guillaume, Victor Tortora, Julien Tortora and Pierre-Jean Perrin, Letter to G., Rethinking our society with André Gorz, autoproduction.
