= Pierre-Roch Vigneron =

French painter, sculptor, and lithographer (1789-1872)

- Born: Pierre-Roch Vigneron; 16 August 1789; Vosnon, France
- Died: 12 October 1872 (aged 83); Paris, France
- Occupations: Painter; Portrait artist
- Known for: Painting
- Awards: Legion of Honour (1854)

Pierre-Roch Vigneron (16 August 1789 – 12 October 1872) was a French painter, sculptor, and lithographer. He was an early practitioner of lithography during its formative years in France.

== Biography ==
=== Early life and education ===
Pierre-Roch Vigneron was born on 16 August 1789 in Vosnon, Aube, France.

Paris became his home after he arrived to study painting. He studied in the workshop of Gustave Gautherot before joining the French painting school of Antoine-Jean Gros.

He attended the provincial Royal Academy of Painting and Sculpture in Toulouse, focusing on miniatures and sculpture. His talent earned him an academy prize for a bas-relief composition depicting Aristides.

=== Salon of 1812 ===
Returning to Paris in 1812, he devoted himself to portraiture while also excelling in other artistic genres. He exhibited for the first time at the Salon of 1812, organized by the École des Beaux-Arts. His paintings, drawings, and lithographs were exhibited at the Musée Royal (now Louvre) in the Salon from 1812 to 1865.

Gros, his mentor, shut down his studio between 1814 and 1815 as a result of the political events affecting France. Vigneron entered the École des Beaux-Arts on 7 February 1814.

==== Une ambulance en 1814, pendant la campagne de France ====
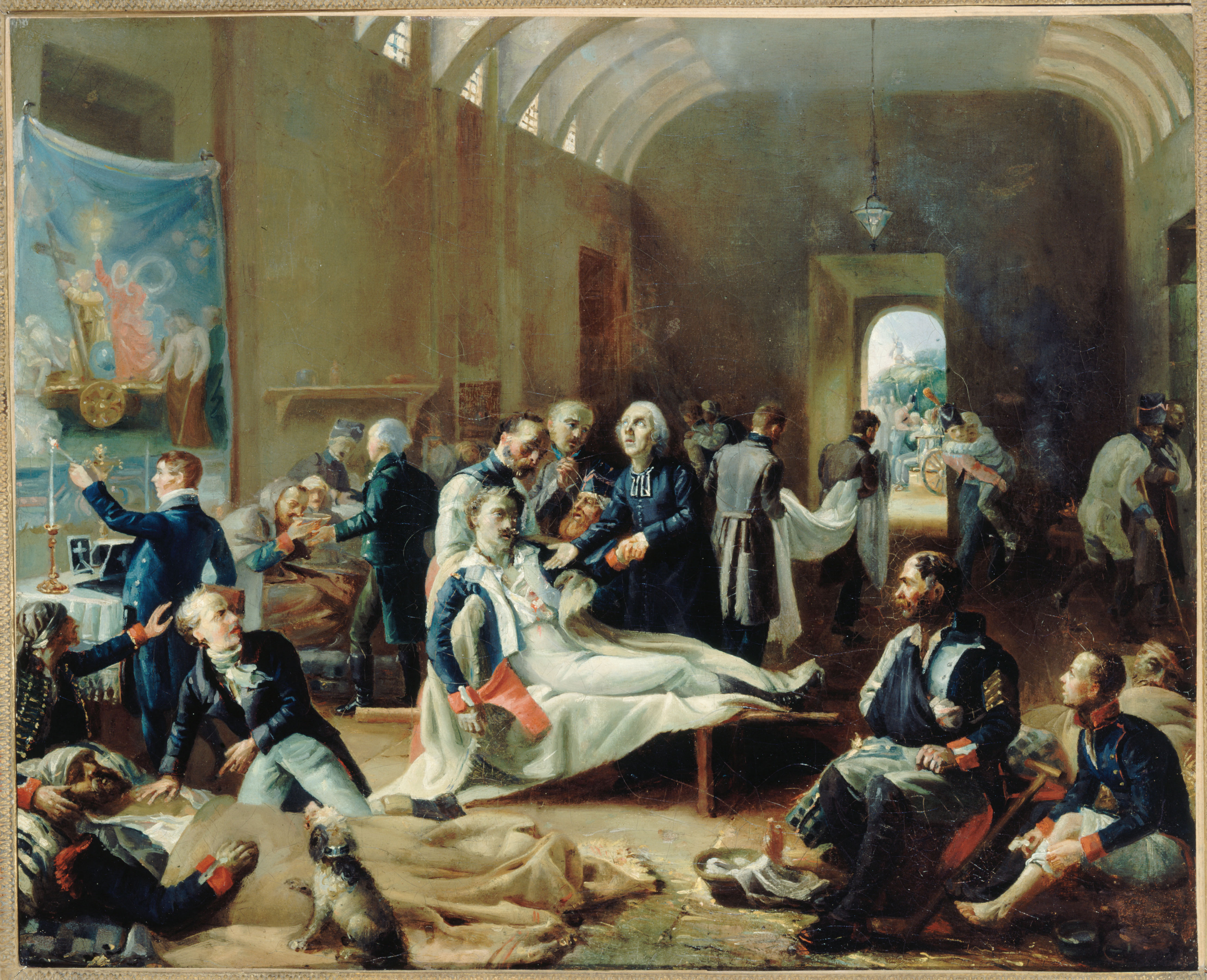
Une ambulance en 1814, pendant la campagne de France, 1814.

That year, Vigneron painted Une ambulance en 1814, pendant la campagne de France, illustrating an ambulance scene during the French Campaign.

His style closely resembled that of Jean-Henri Marlet. Early in his career, he collaborated in the studios of Charles Philibert de Lasteyrie, where he created his first drawing model on French stone, drawing from the lithograph of Lasteyrie. Vigneron embraced a sentimental and melancholic style with his genre paintings, reflecting the transition from the classicism of Jacques-Louis David to the romanticism of Eugène Delacroix. His preferred subjects included themes of sorrow and misfortune, such as tombs, coffins, abandoned children, military tribunals, and the perils of vice and gambling.

==== Les apprêts d'un mariage ====
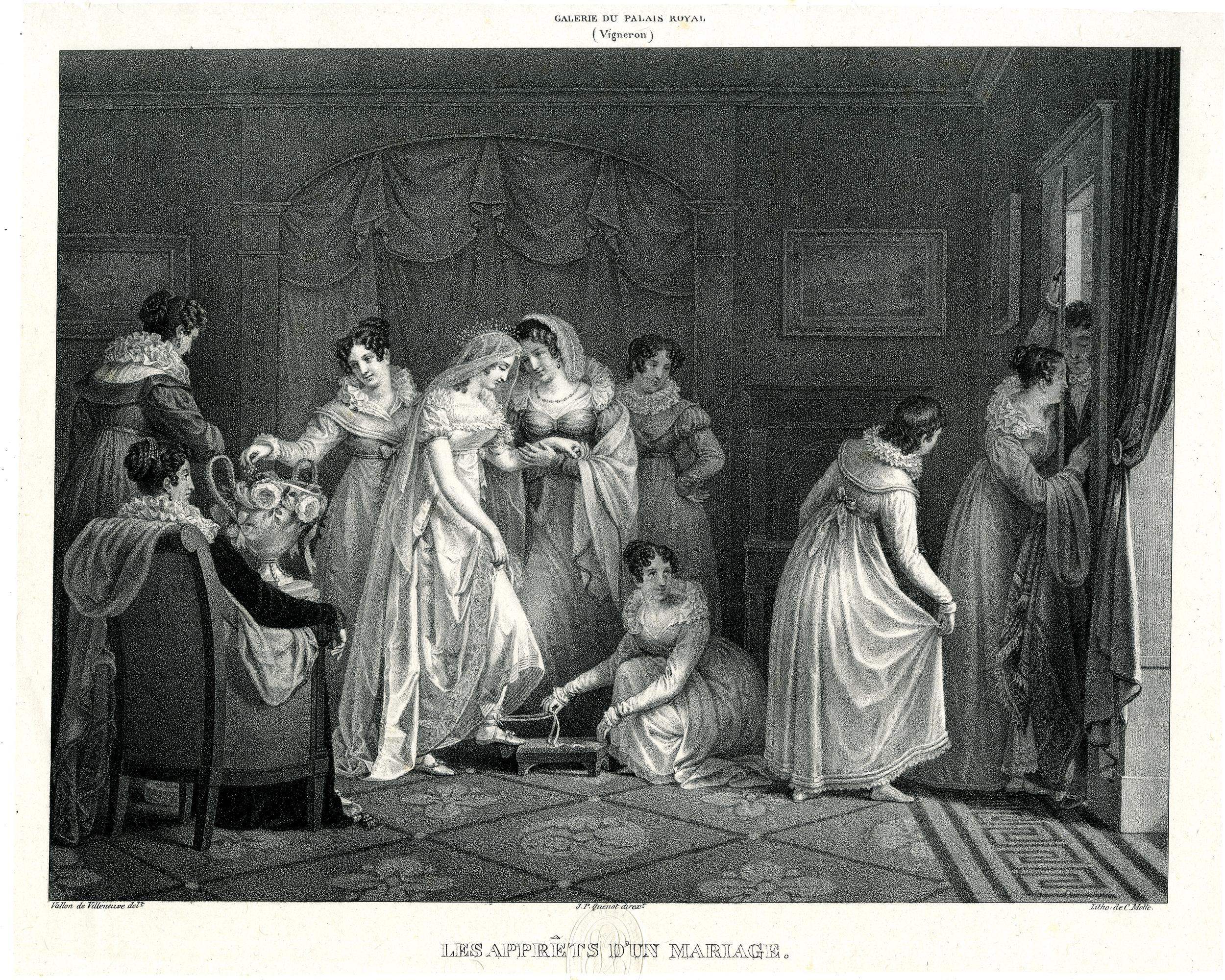
Les apprêts d'un mariage, 1817.

In 1817, he painted Les apprêts d'un mariage (The Preparations for a Wedding) with the lithograph done by Julien Vallou de Villeneuve and printed by Charles Étienne Pierre Motte. It was later owned by the Duke of Orléans Louis Philippe (future King of the French) in the 1820s and placed at the Galerie d'Orléans.

He was awarded a gold medal at the Salon of 1817 for various lithographs, a collection of stage artist portraits, and twelve large portraits of actors and actresses. The 1817 Salon was followed by another gold medal at a provincial Fine Arts exhibition in Douai.

==== Le Soldat laboureur ====
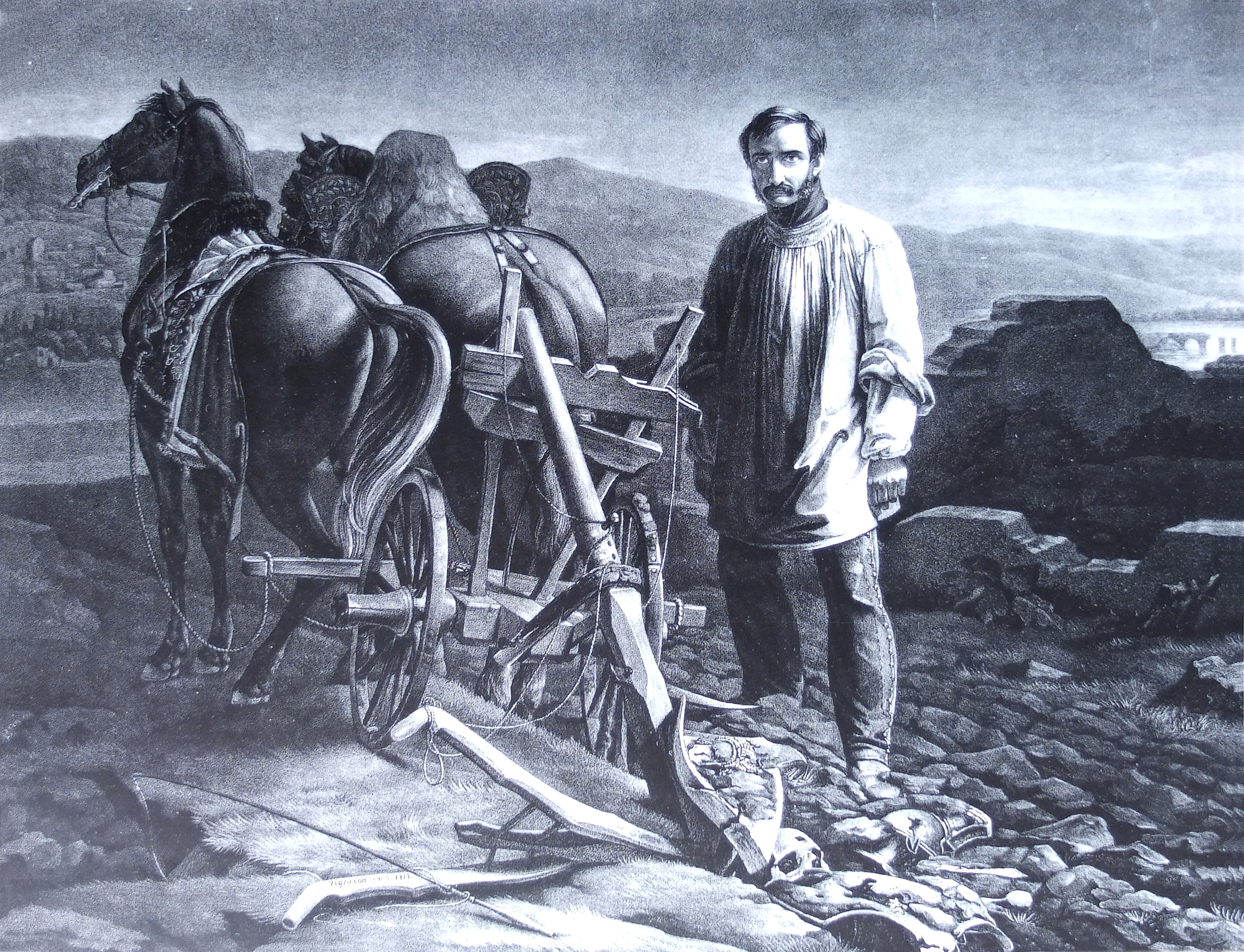
Le Soldat laboureur, 1818.

A notable work titled Le Soldat laboureur (Soldier Ploughman) was completed by Vigneron in 1818. The artwork depicts a man ploughing an old battlefield, his plough revealing the buried bones of those who met their fate on the tragic ground. By the 1830s, ownership of the painting transferred to the city of Lille in France.

==== Convoi du pauvre ====
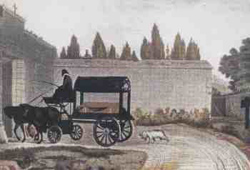
Convoi du pauvre, 1819.

His 1819 painting titled Le convoi du pauvre (Convoy of the Poor or The Poor Man's Convoy), printed by Jean-Pierre-Marie Jazet, brought him significant recognition. Popularized through lithography and engraving, the painting showed a hearse heading to the cemetery, followed only by a dog—the deceased's sole companion.

Vigneron participated in the Salon of 1819. His artwork depicted Christopher Columbus showing his irons to the Catholic Monarchs of Spain and included the description, "il montre les marques de ses fers à Ferdinand et à Isabelle" It was later acquired by the Élie, duc Decazes in 1822.

Vigneron also reproduced military scenes originally created by Jean-Henri Marlet, including notable works such as the Duke of Berry's assassination, among other prints. He presented his work illustrating Charles, Duke of Berry "receiving the aid of religion" on 14 February 1820, published by French lithographer François-Séraphin Delpech. The scene bore a resemblance to a Marlet work from 1810, which depicted a medical professor checking the pulse of a sick man lying in a hospital bed.

=== Salon of 1822 ===
In 1822, he painted a work under the title of Le Duel which was engraved by Jazet. It was described by Charles Paul Landon as the aftermath of a fatal confrontation between a young aristocratic man and a professional swordsman. The young man dies in the arms of his two witnesses, while his ruthless opponent, rather than offering aid, coldly wipes his bloodied sword before retreating. It was later acquired by the Society of Friends of the Arts. At the 1822 Salon, in addition to the painting of The Duel, Vigneron exhibited his works: Le Soldat laboureur, Une mère forcée par la misère d'abandonner son enfant, and the fourth, Exécution militaire. Painted in the 1822, the Exécution militaire (Military Execution) was notably engraved in aquatint by Jean-Pierre-Marie Jazet. Vigneron also included the gambling-themed lithograph Le Joueur Ruiné (The Ruined Player). C. P. Landon wrote that the scene, likely suggested by Charles-Émile-Callande de Champmartin, portrayed "a gambler whose fate has taken away his last resources and who has just hanged himself in his attic where there are only the four walls, the floor is strewn with dice and torn cards".

The artworks Convoi du Pauvre, Exécution militaire, and Une mère forcée par la misère d abandonner son enfant were given to the Duke of Choiseul in 1824.

Les Petits Cuisiniers (The Little Cooks) and L'Enfant Abandonné (The Abandoned Child), two of his works, appeared at the 1824 Salon. He won a silver medal at a Fine Arts exhibition in Lille in 1825.

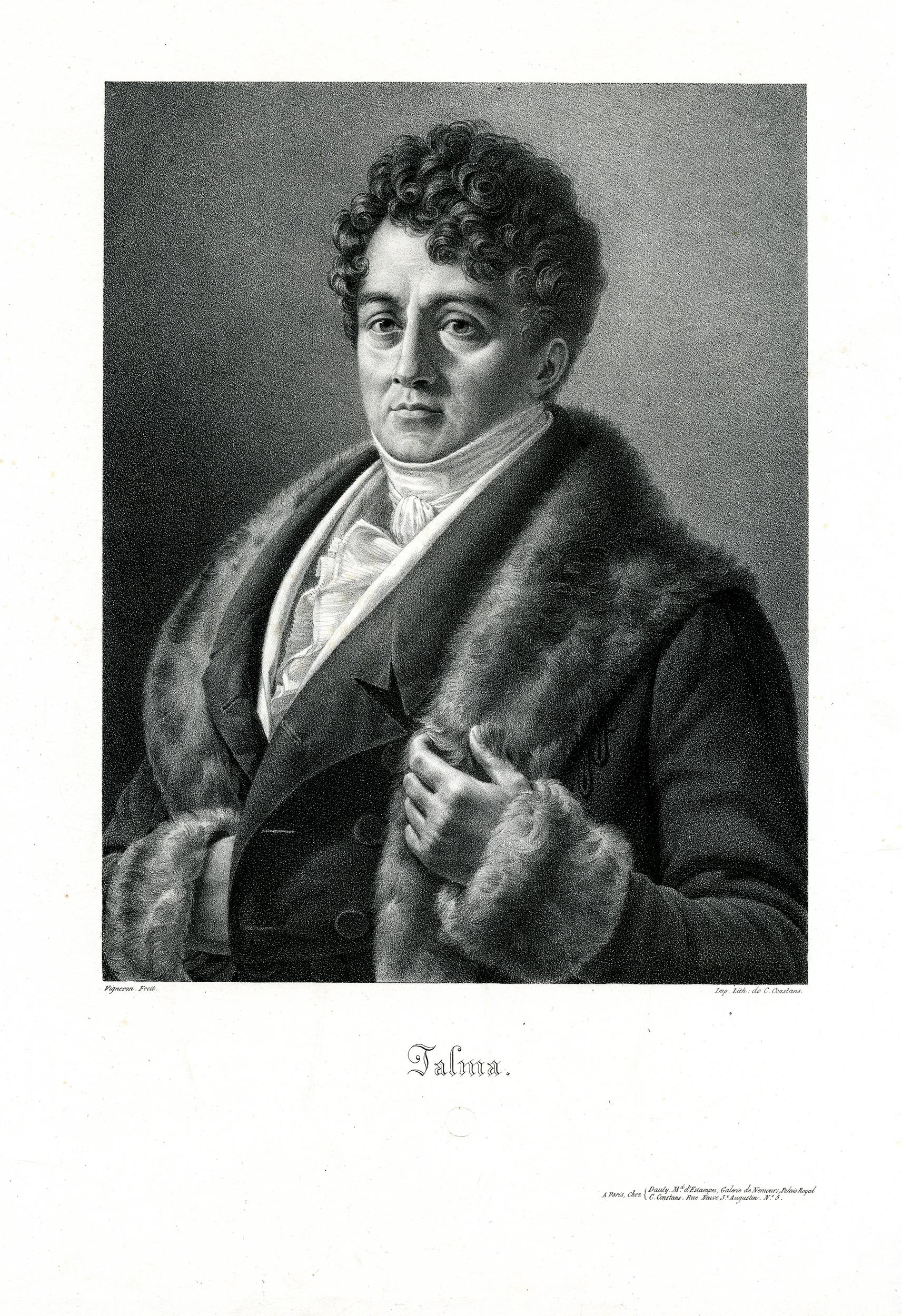
Talma à Brunoy, 1826.

Lithographic portrait series showcasing dramatic artists, famous painters, doctors, and other key figures were among Vigneron's published works. Among other works, his lithographed portraits of Paul Courrier, Mademoiselle Mars, and François-Joseph Talma were displayed in 1826. His work Talma à Brunoy was a full-length portrait of François-Joseph Talma, the French stage actor, in his office in Brunoy.

==== L'enfant abandonné ====
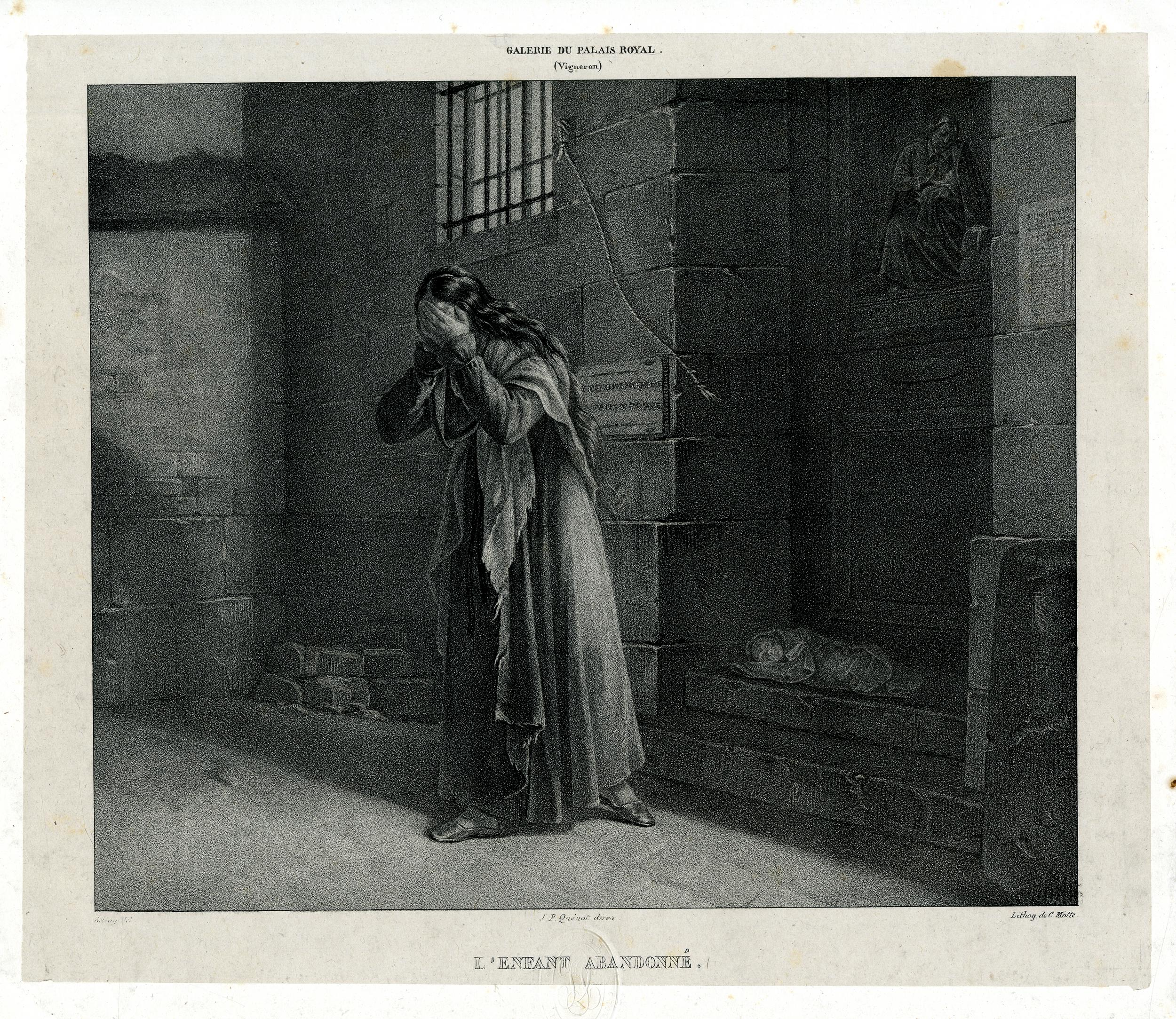
L'enfant abandonné, 1824.

He also exhibited L'enfant abandonné (The abandoned child) in 1826 at the Parisian Galerie Lebrun.

Later in his career, Vigneron shifted toward portraiture, drawing inspiration from artists like Achille Devéria and François Grenier de Grevedon.

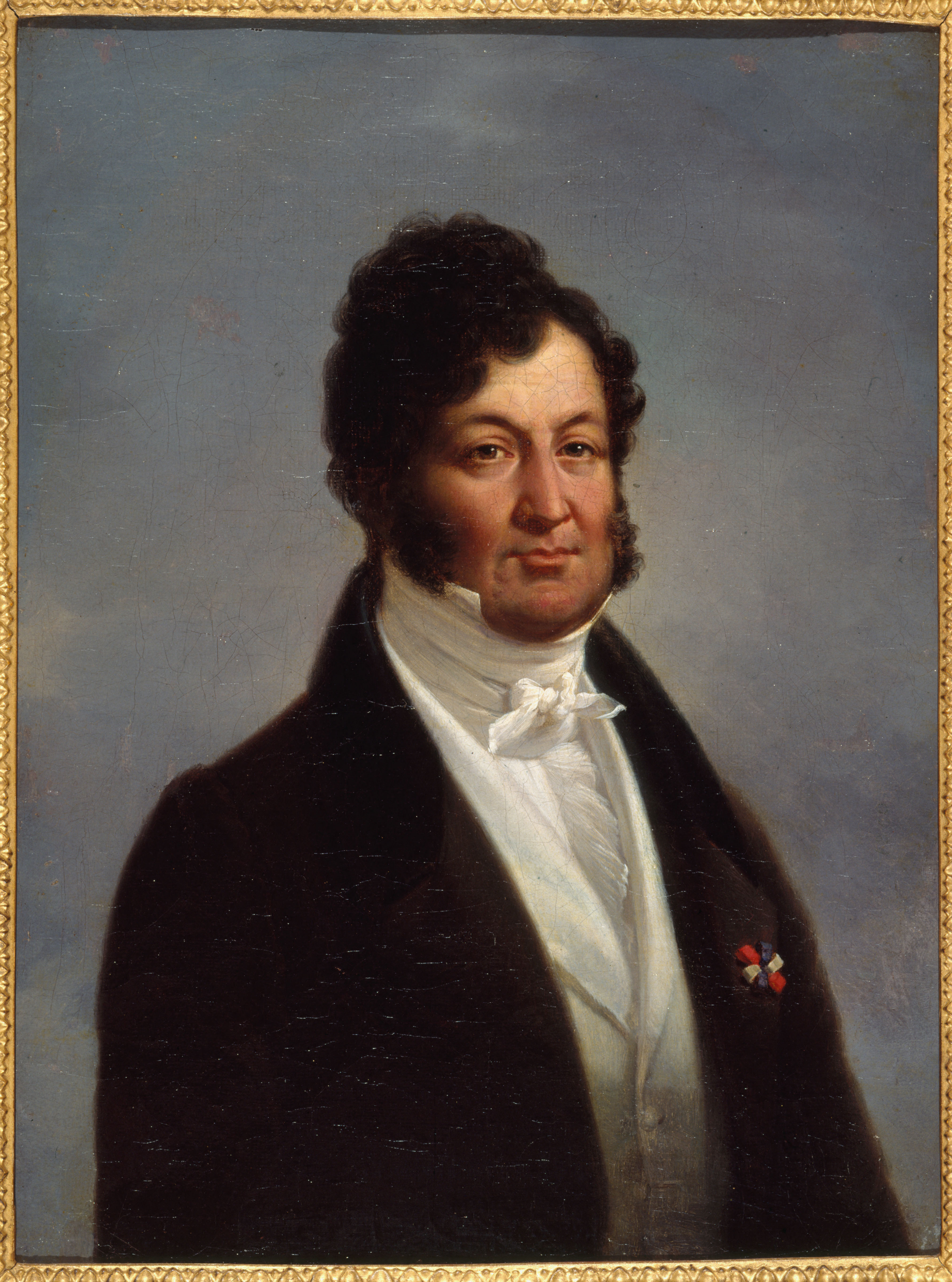
1831 Portrait of Louis-Philippe I (1773–1850)

The French painted completed a portrait of Louis Philippe I in 1831, following his ascent to the throne after the July Revolution of 1830.

By 1831, Vigneron began running a workshop for students.

In 1833, he exhibited les Héritiers ("the Heirs"), Avis aux mères ("Notice to Mothers"), and L'Orphelin ("the Orphan").

==== L'Orphelin ====
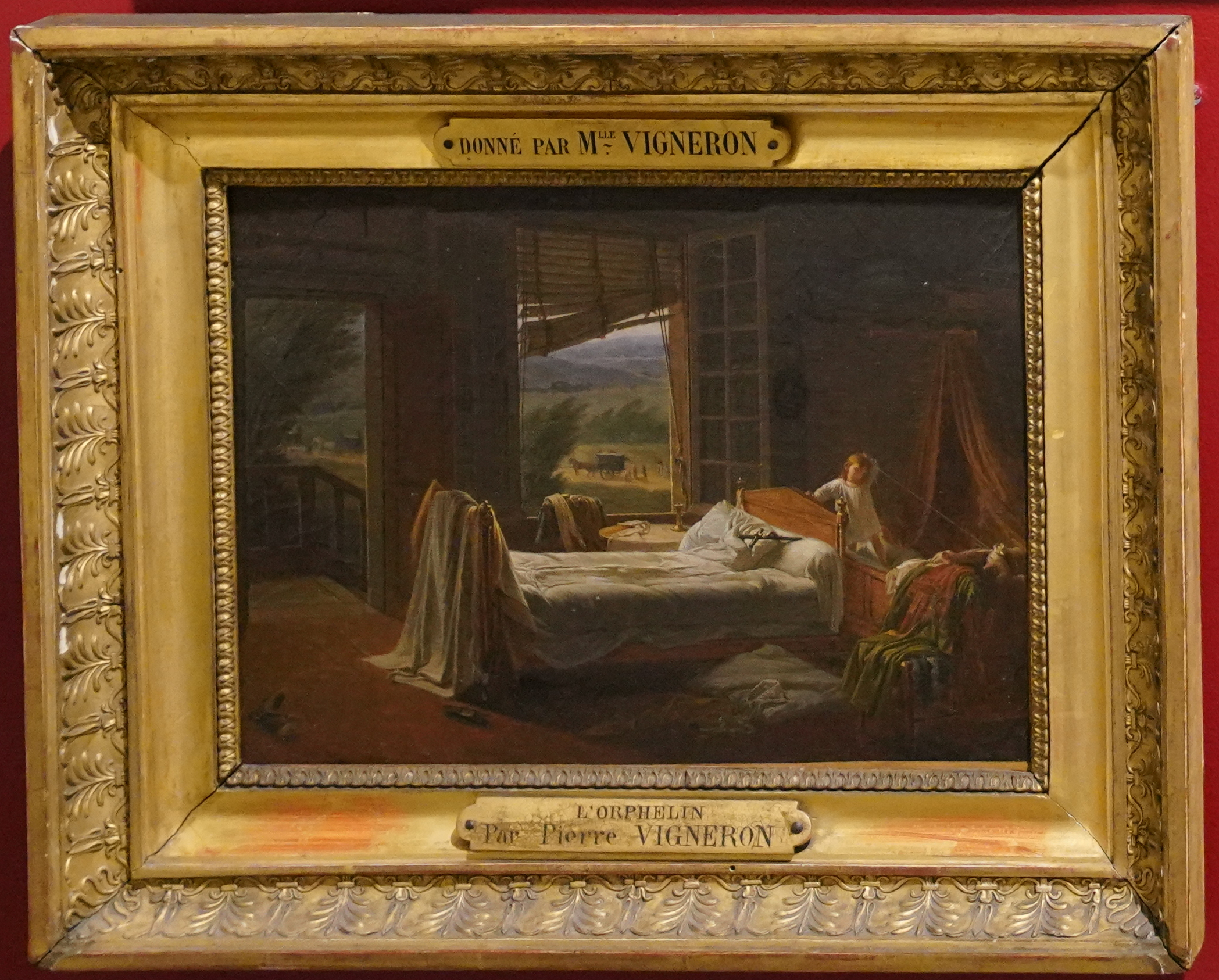
L'Orphelin, 1833.

Vigneron's piece L'Orphelin was acquired by the King of the French at the Salon of 1833 for 1,200 francs and sent to the Château de Compiègne on 18 September 1833. At Château de Compiègne, Vigneron's piece was displayed in the service lounge during the 1830s.

Absent from exhibitions between 1833 and 1846, he reemerged at the Salon of 1847 with a selection of portraits, including Jean-Pierre Moussa, Mme and Mlle Duprez, Countess Łubieńska, A. Brunet, Doctor Brunet, Augustin Thierry and Madame Thierry, and five in wash. That year, he obtained the medal of the second class from the Institut de France. By 1848, he was working out of a studio on 126 Rue du Faubourg Saint-Martin with his daughter Mlle Mira. In the Salon of 1848 beginning on 15 March 1848 at the Louvre, he exhibited Jadi, Aujourd'hui, a full-length portrait of Hugues Bouffé (of the Théâtre des Variétés), as well as other portraits at the Salons of 1849 and 1850. Vigneron's achievements, including a large collection of exhibition medals, led to his decoration with the Cross of the Legion of Honor in 1854.

As the creator of more than 4,000 pieces, his portfolio encompassed sketches, drawings, and paintings across all genres.

== Death ==
Pierre-Roch Vigneron died at the age of 83 in Paris, France on 12 October 1872.

== Family ==
Vigneron married the daughter of Gautherot and had two children. His daughter, Miss Mira Vigneron, was a painter born in 1817 in Paris and learned under Pierre-Roch's guidance.

== Works ==
- Une ambulance en 1814, pendant la campagne de France (An Ambulance During the French Campaign) (1814)
- Les apprêts d'un mariage, a Paris (The Preparations for a Wedding) (1817)
- Soldat laboureur I & II (Soldier Ploughman) (1818–1833)
- Christophe Colomb et Ferdinand (1819)
- Convoi du pauvre (The Poor Man's Convoy) (1819)
- Le Duel (The Duel) (1822)
- Une Mère forcée par la misère d'abandonner son enfant (1822)
- Exécution militaire (A Military Execution) (1824)
- Petits Cuisiniers (Little Cooks) (1824)
- L'enfant abandonné (The Abandoned Child) (1826)
- Talma à Brunoy (Talma in Brunoy)
- Le Joueur ruiné (The Ruined Player)
- L'Orphelin (The Orphan) (1833)
- Les Héritiers (The Heirs) (1833)
- Avis aux mères (Advice to Mothers) (1833)
- La Confession (The Confessional)
- Chiffonnier qui recueille un enfant (Ragpicker Who Takes in a Child)
- Marchand de vin dans son laboratoire (Wine Merchant in his Laboratory)
- The Billiard Player
- The Little Savoyard
- Jadi (1848)
- Aujourd'hui (Today) (1848)

== Gallery ==
Portraits by Pierre-Roch Vigneron

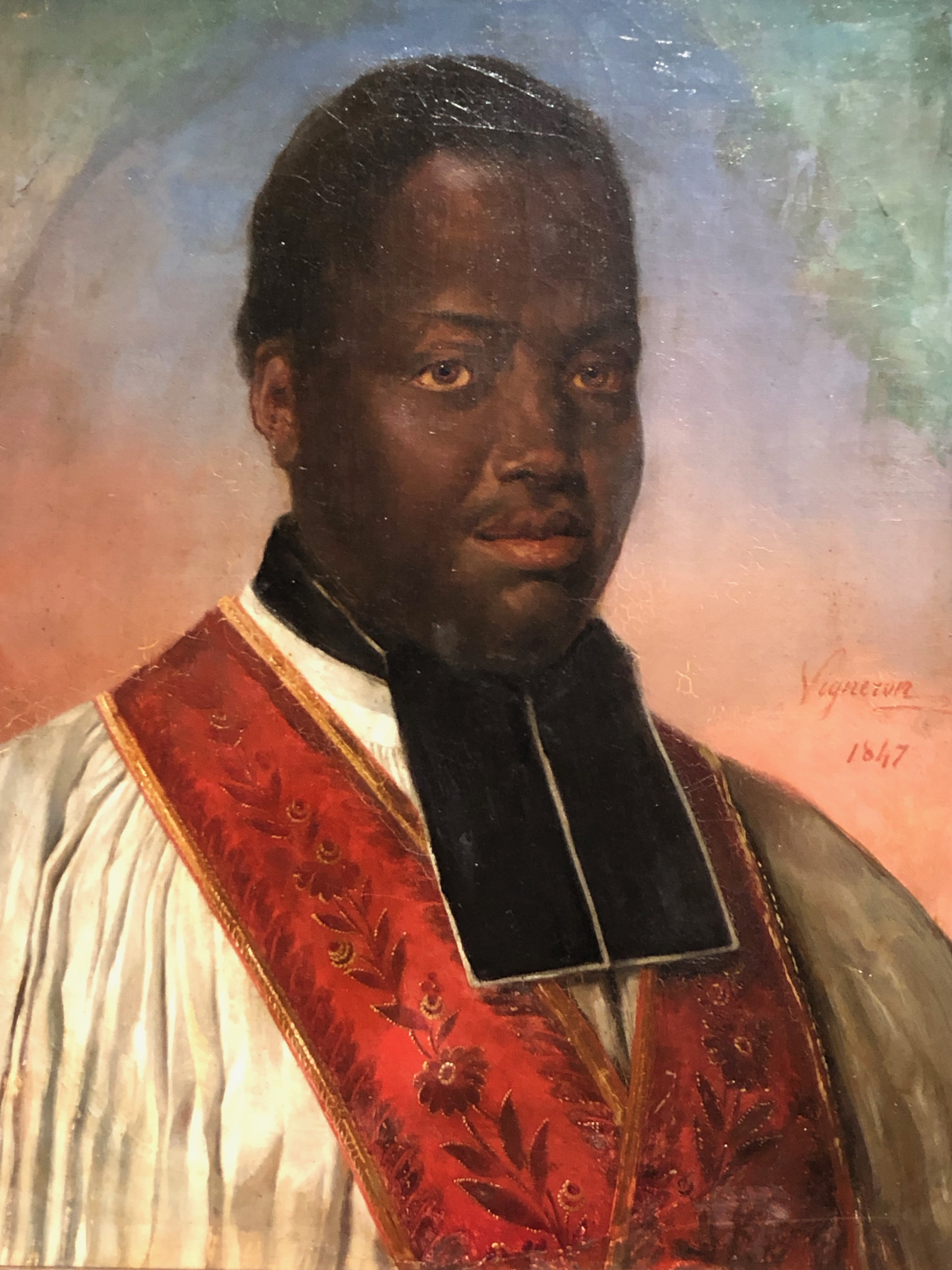
Jean-Pierre Moussa

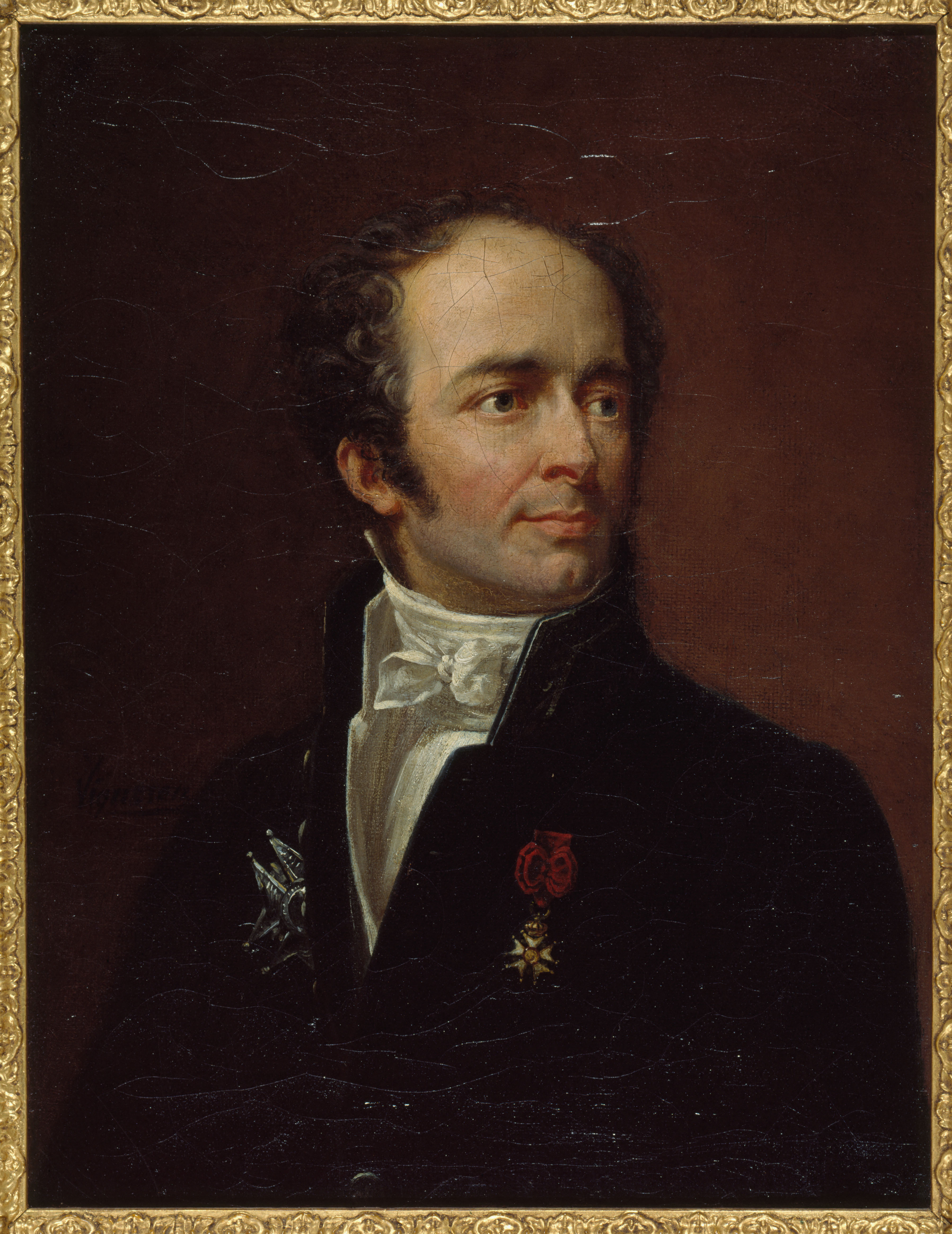
Maximilien Sébastien Foy

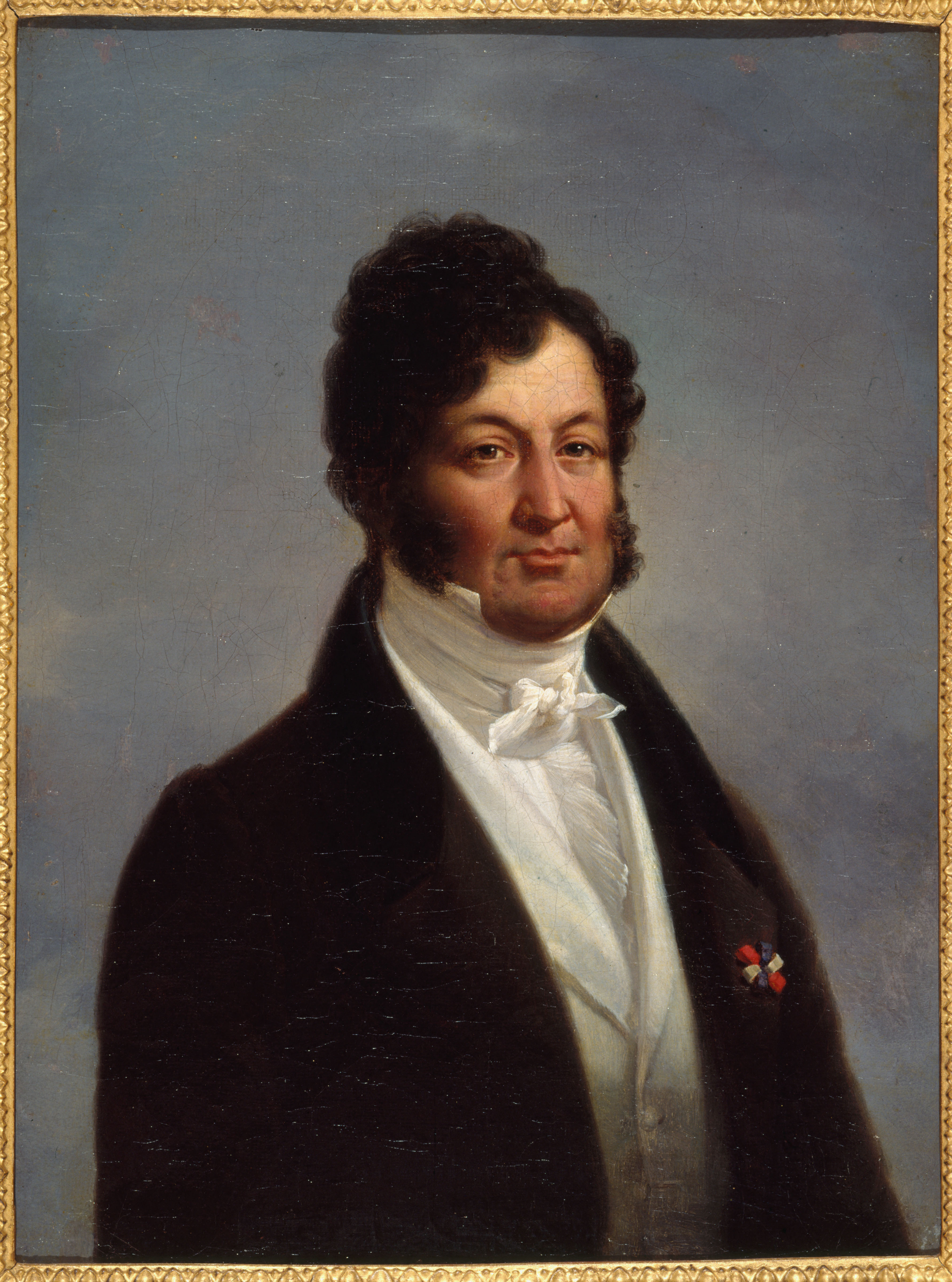
Louis-Philippe I

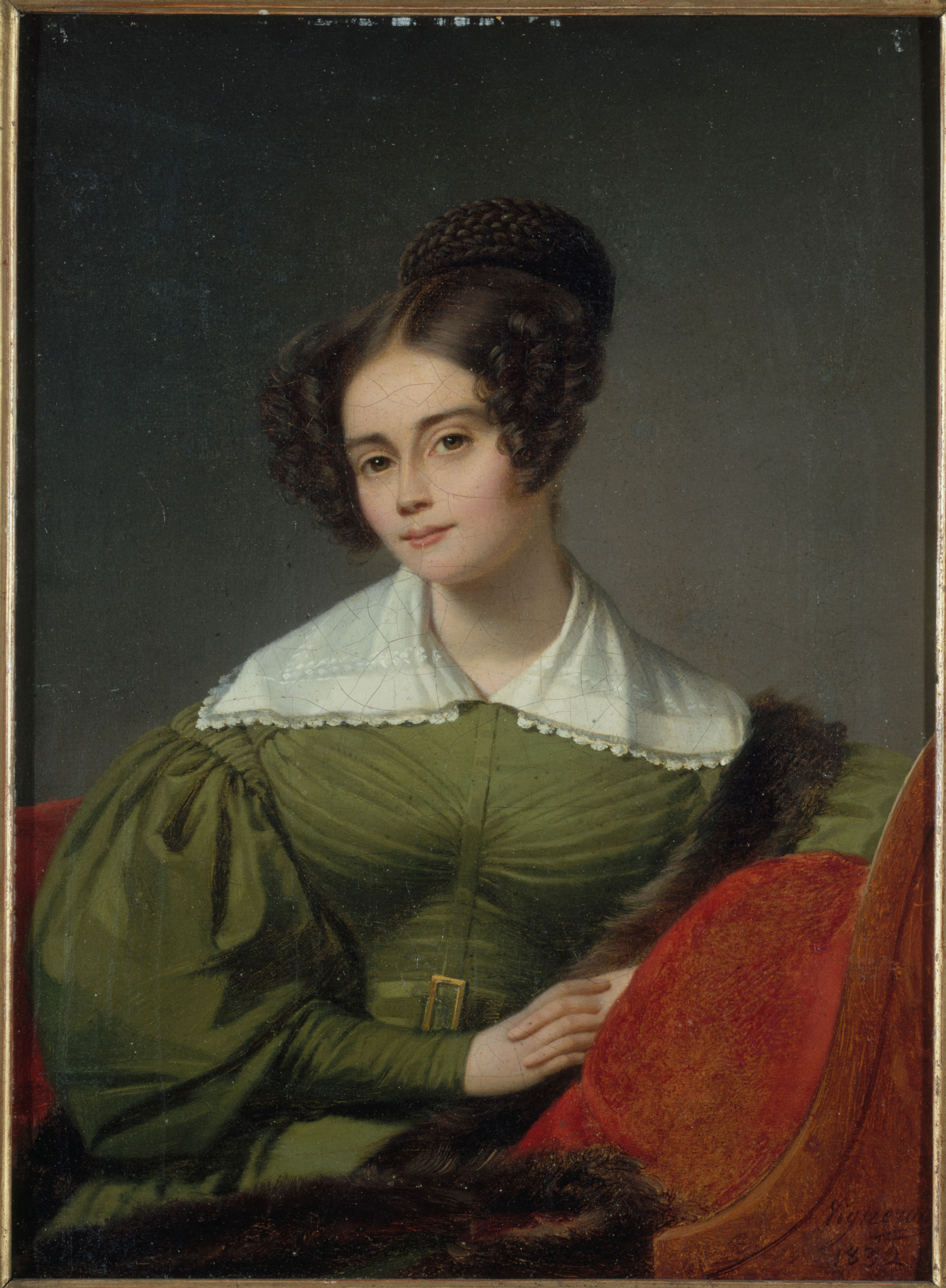
Madame Rathelot

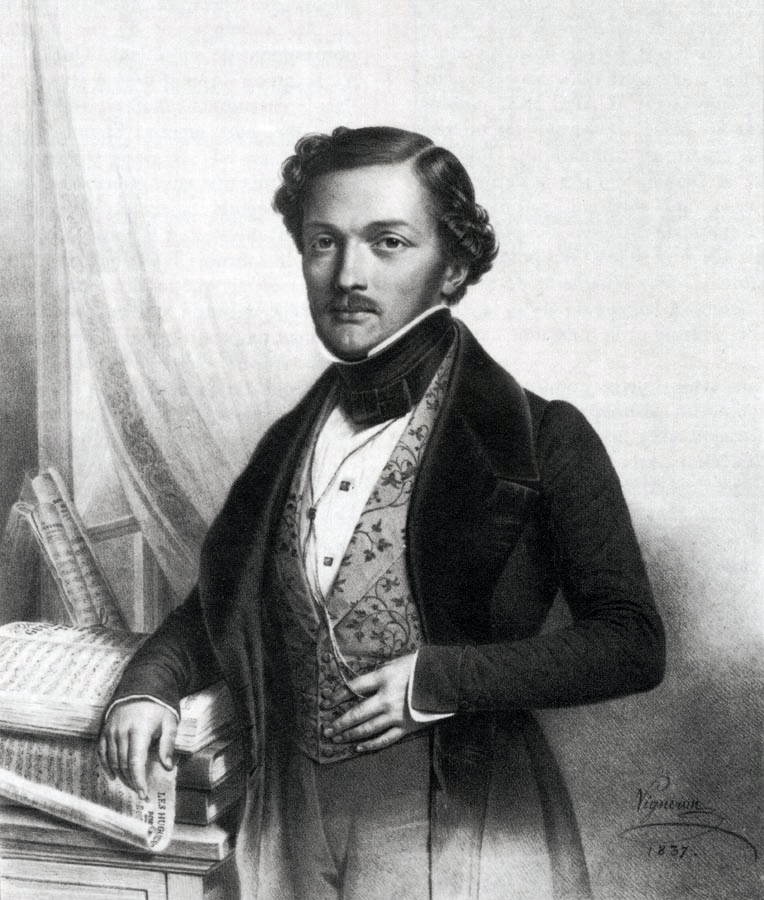
Gilbert-Louis Duprez

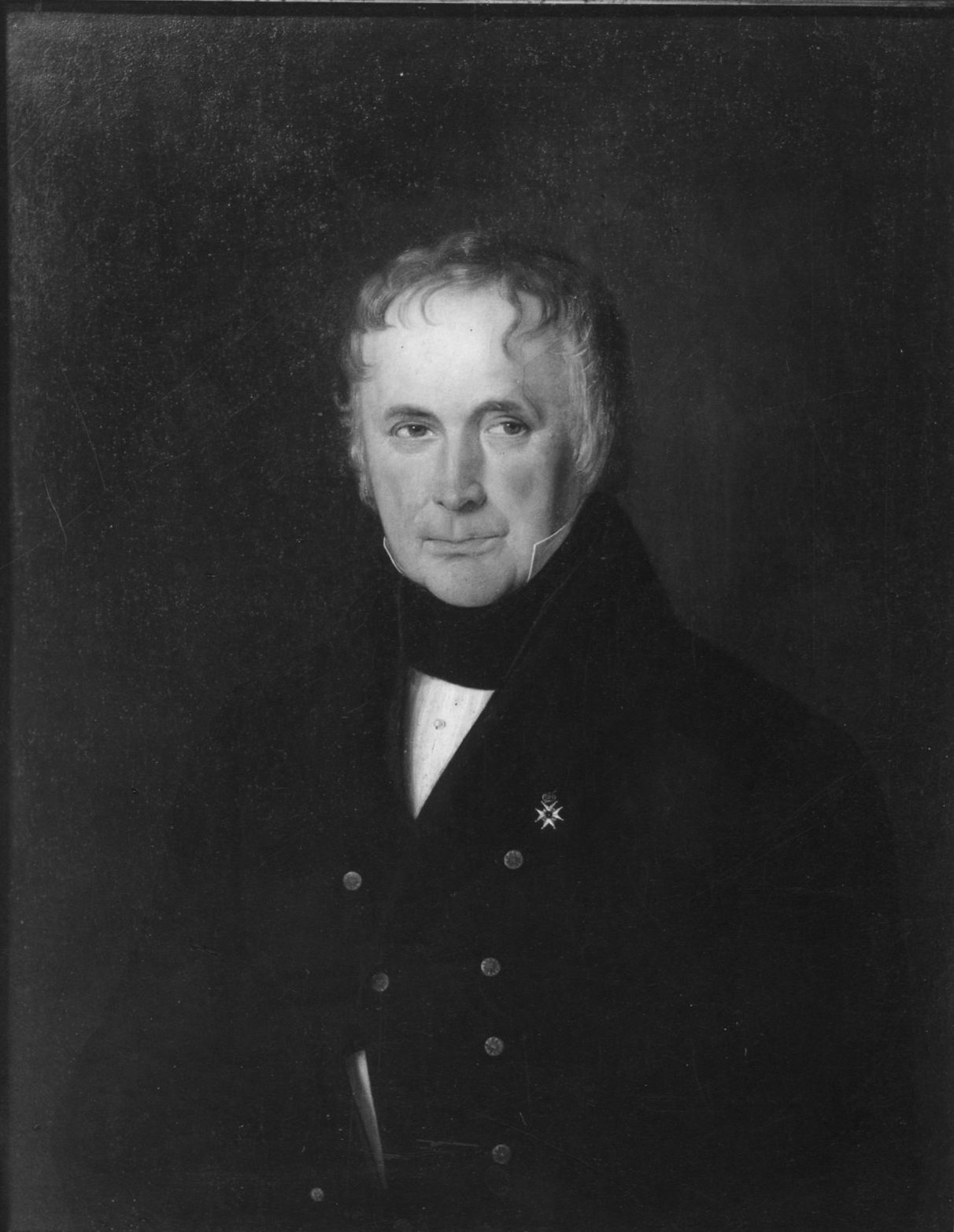
Magnus Andreas Thulstrup

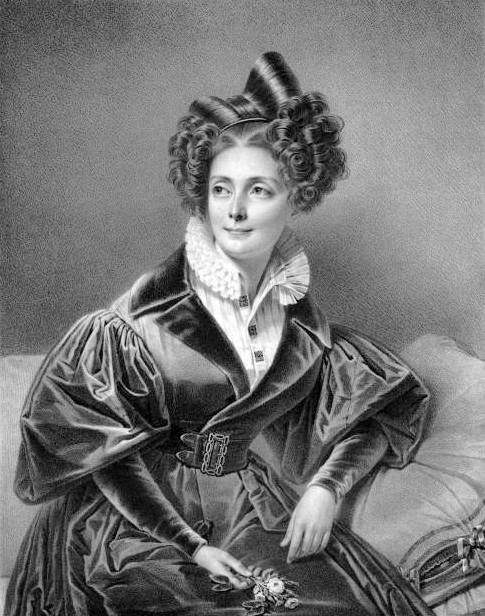
Félicité Pradher

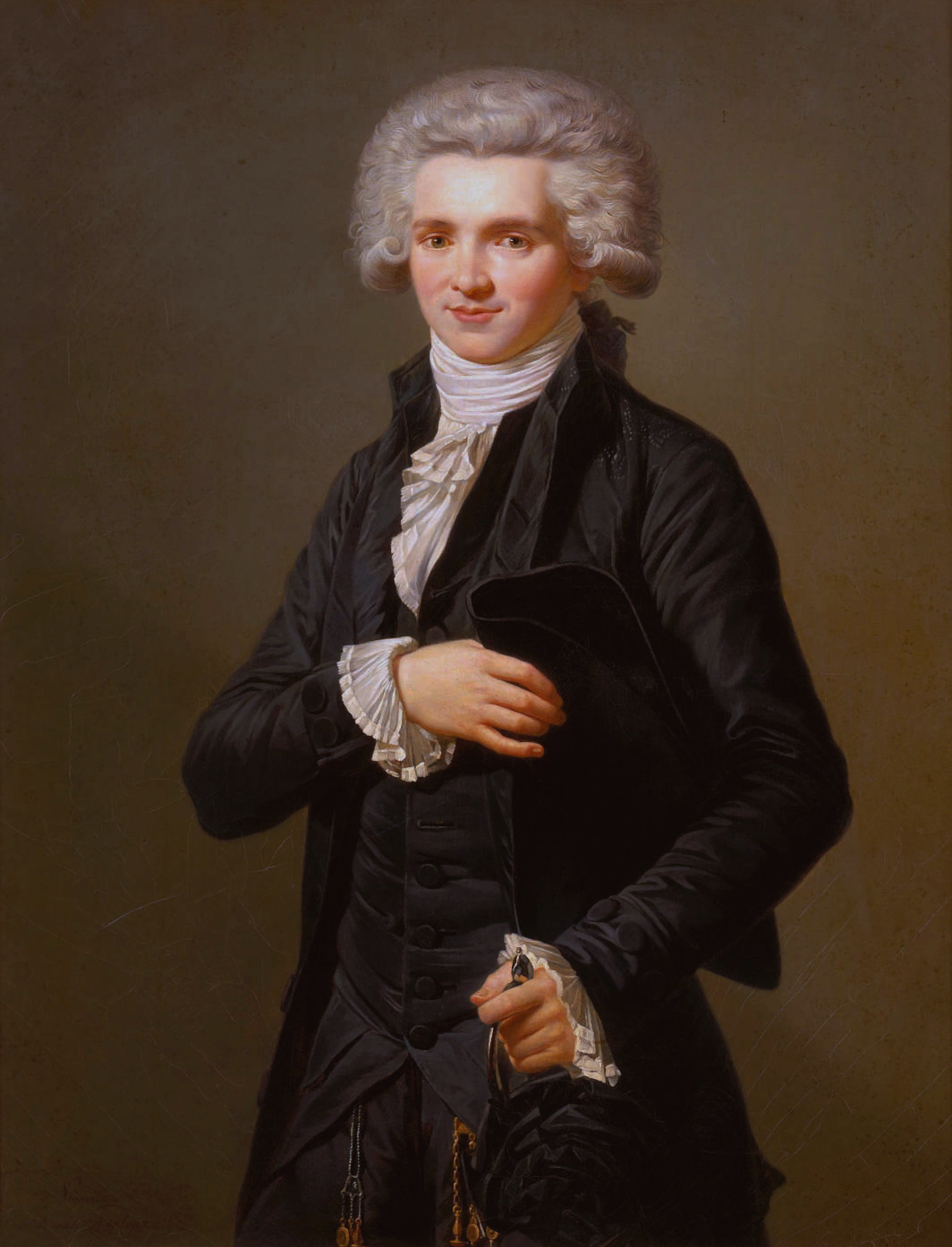
Maximilien Robespierre
