= Marc Kravetz =

French reporter and journalist (1942–2022)

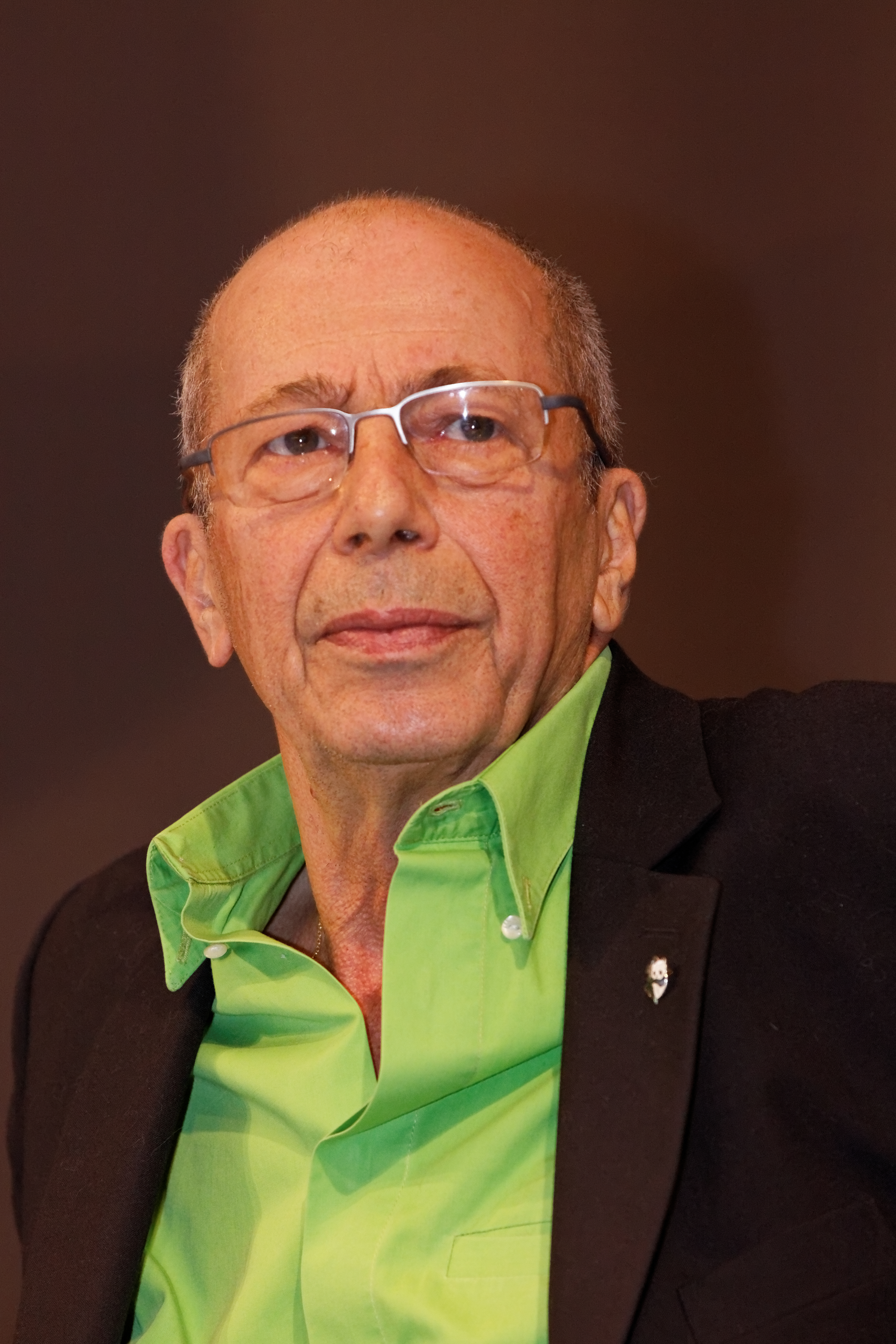
- Kravetz in 2012
- Born: 2 October 1942
- Died: 28 October 2022 (aged 80)
- Education: École normale supérieure de Saint-Cloud
- Occupations: Reporter; Journalist

Marc Kravetz (2 October 1942 – 28 October 2022) was a French reporter and journalist. He received the Albert Londres Prize in 1980 for his reporting on the Iranian Revolution while working for the daily newspaper Libération and presented the column Les Matins de France Culture.

== Biography ==
Kravetz was born during World War II into a Jewish family with a modest background. His father worked as a secretary in Blanc-Mesnil and had been a member of the French Communist Party since 1932. His mother worked in the municipal government of Levallois-Perret. As an adolescent, he practiced gymnastics with the Fédération sportive et gymnique du travail.

Kravetz studied at the École normale supérieure de Saint-Cloud and joined the Front universitaire antifasciste (FUA) in 1961, which comprised many youth of the Jeunesse Étudiante Chrétienne. He became head of the FUA order service, traveling to Algeria in 1962 with his friend, Jean-Louis Peninou, to be a volunteer teacher.

Kravetz became secretary-general of the national office of the National Union of Students of France from 1964 to 1965 under the presidency of Bernard Schreiner. He was a member of the youth organization of the Unified Socialist Party and was close with Marc Heurgon and André Gorz. He also assisted Mustapha Khayati in writing the pamphlet On the Poverty of Student Life, published in November 1966. At the time, he adhered to the theses of the far-left and participated in a guerrilla training session in Cuba led by Christian Blanc and Pierre Goldman. During the events of May 68, he contributed to the newspaper Action.

From 1975 to 1990, Kravetz covered many conflicts in the Middle East, such as the Lebanese Civil War and the Israeli–Palestinian conflict. In 1979, he carried out a report on the Iranian Revolution and wrote the book Irano nox after his trip. From 1997 to 2000, he directed Air-France magazine alongside Jean Bayle. In 2009, he became a member of the sponsorship committee of the Institut régional du cinéma et de l'audiovisuel, chaired by Magà Ettori with its head office in Bastia.

After writing the column Les Matins de France Culture for many years, he took part in the new program Cultures Monde from January to July 2011 on France Culture.

Marc Kravetz died on 28 October 2022, at the age of 80.

== Publications ==
- L'insurrection étudiante, 2-13 mai 1968, ensemble critique et documentaire (1968)
- Irano nox (1982)
- Armand Gatti (2003)
- Portraits du jour, 150 histoires pour un tour du monde (2008)
- Obama : petite encyclopédie (2008)
- Portraits d’animaux, 50 histoires pour un bestiaire (2009)
