= Critique of Economic Reason =

1989 book by André Gorz

Critique of Economic Reason is a 1989 book by the French philosopher André Gorz. The book is a comprehensive examination of the assumptions and values underlying the dominant economic ideologies of the modern world, and a call for a reevaluation of the way we think about social life. The book is also a critique of work and a historicisation of the concept of work as well as a rejection of Marx "utopia of work".

== Summary ==
Gorz begins by arguing that the dominant economic theories of the 20th century, including neoliberalism and classical liberalism, are based on the assumption that human beings are motivated solely by self-interest and the desire for material wealth. This, he argues, is a fundamentally flawed and incomplete understanding of human nature, and has led to a narrow approach to economic and social policy which is damaging to society.

Instead, Gorz advocates for a new approach to economic and social life that takes into account the full range of human needs and values, including non-material ones such as social relationships, community, and personal fulfillment. He argues that the pursuit of economic growth for its own sake is ultimately self-defeating, as it leads to social inequality, and calls for a more holistic and sustainable approach to economic and social development.

Gorz also critiques the consumer society and the ideology of consumerism, arguing that it is based on the false premise that happiness can be achieved through the acquisition of more and more material goods. He argues that this ideology is a key factor in the environmental and social problems facing the world today, and calls for a shift towards a more sustainable and equitable economic system that prioritizes the well-being of people and the planet over short-term profit.

== Reception ==
Gorz's arguments have been widely debated and discussed in the academic literature. David McNally contended that Gorz's analysis offers a much-needed alternative to the dominant neoliberal ideology and provides a valuable perspective on the limitations of market-based solutions.

Some scholars have focused on specific aspects of Gorz's argument, such as his critique of work and his vision of a post-work society. For instance philosopher André Comte-Sponville argues that Gorz's critique of work highlights important issues around the meaning and value of work in contemporary society and provides a valuable starting point for thinking about alternative approaches to work and leisure. Other scholars have also commented on the significance of Gorz's work. James K. Galbraith also argued that Gorz's work offers a "deeply humane and practical alternative to the narrow and self-defeating economic theories that dominate our time."
