= Ronald Fraser (historian) =

Ronald Angus Fraser (9 December 1930 – 10 February 2012) was a British historian noted for his oral histories and in particular for Blood of Spain, his oral history of the Spanish Civil War.

Born in Hamburg to an upper-middle class Scottish father and a wealthy American mother, Fraser was educated at boarding school in England and the USA and undertook further studies in Switzerland and France. He chronicled his upbringing in his oral history In Search of a Past: The Rearing of an English Gentleman, 1933-1945 (1984), in which interviews with the servants at his family's Berkshire country house served as a counterpoint to his own memories. Fraser spent five years as a correspondent with Reuters in Brussels, The Hague and London before moving to Spain in 1957 to become a full-time writer.

Fraser was one of the pioneers of oral history in the 1960s and '70s most notably with In Hiding: The Life of Manuel Cortes (1972) and Blood of Spain: An Oral History of the Spanish Civil War (1979). His book Napoleon’s Cursed War: Spanish Popular Resistance in the Peninsular War, 1808-1814 (2008) applied his experience of oral history to traditional archival sources.

Fraser's friendship with André Gorz led to his involvement with the New Left Review from the early 1960s. He was a lifelong socialist and at his death a senior member of the New Left Trust. He was a founder of New Left Books, the parent company of publisher Verso Books.

== Bibliography ==
- Yvette (1960)
- Work: Twenty Personal Accounts (1968)
- Work: Twenty Personal Accounts Volume 2 (1969)
- In Hiding: The Life of Manuel Cortes (1972; revised ed. 2010)
- The Pueblo: A Mountain Village on the Costa del Sol (1973); Published in the U.S.A. as Tajos : A mountain village on the Costa del Sol
- Blood of Spain: An Oral History of the Spanish Civil War (1979)
- In Search of a Past: The Manor House Amnersfield, 1933-1945 (1984; revised ed. 2010). Published in the U.S.A. as In Search of a Past: The Rearing of an English Gentleman, 1933-1945
- 1968: A Student Generation in Revolt (1988, with eight other authors)
- Napoleon’s Cursed War: Spanish Popular Resistance in the Peninsular War, 1808-1814 (2008)
