= Jean-Pierre Moussa =

Senegalese Catholic priest (1815-1860)

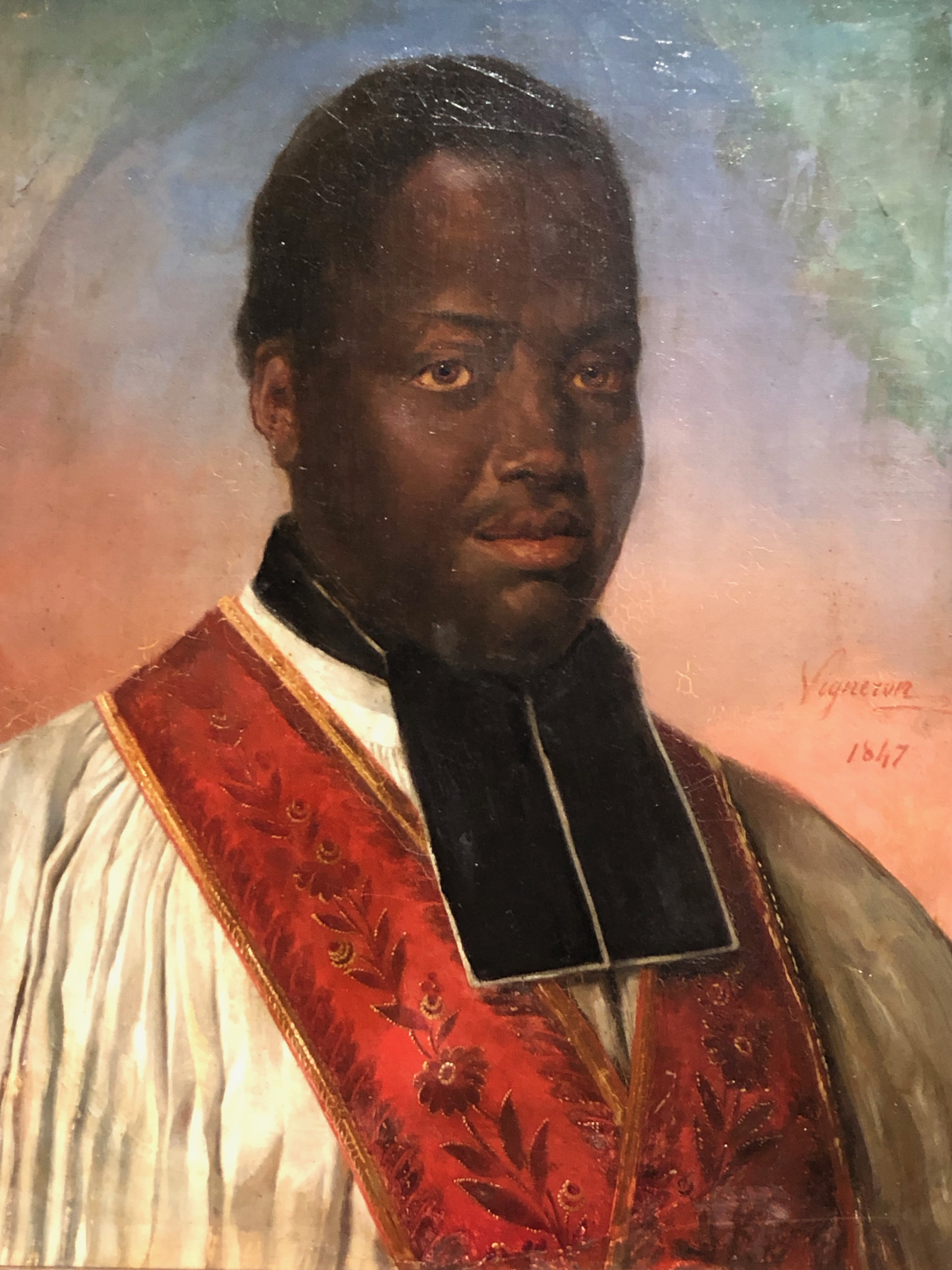
- Portrait of Moussa by Pierre-Roch Vigneron, 1847

Orders
- Rank: Priest

Personal details
- Born: 1815 Saint-Louis, Senegal
- Died: 23 July 1860 (aged 44–45) Port-au-Prince, Haiti
- Parents: Pierre Moussa (father)
- Occupation: Catholic priest; educator

Jean-Pierre Moussa (1814 – 23 July 1860) was a Senegalese Catholic priest and educator. He is noted for aiding former slaves.

== Early life ==
Jean-Pierre Moussa was born in 1815 in Saint-Louis, Senegal. His father was Pierre Moussa, a cantor at the church in Saint-Louis.

Jean-Pierre Moussa, alongside David Boilat and Arsène Fridoil, was among the first Senegalese priests. As children, they were brought from Senegal to France for their education with the assistance of Anne-Marie Javouhey, founding nun of the order of Sisters of St. Joseph of Cluny. Mother Javouhey arranged for 20 boys to be trained as African clergy to aid in evangelizing Senegal. The average age of the African children was 12 years old. Following the deaths of many and the return of others to Senegal, only three progressed to advanced training. According to French historian Georges Goyau, Moussa, Boilat, and Fridoil trained under the guidance of Mother Javouhey at the seminary she established in 1825 in Bailleul, Oise, and transferred to Limoux, Aude in 1829. The three continued their studies at the major seminary of Carcassonne. They eventually completed their theological studies at the Seminary of the Holy Spirit (French: Séminaire du Saint Esprit) in Paris in 1838.

== Priesthood ==
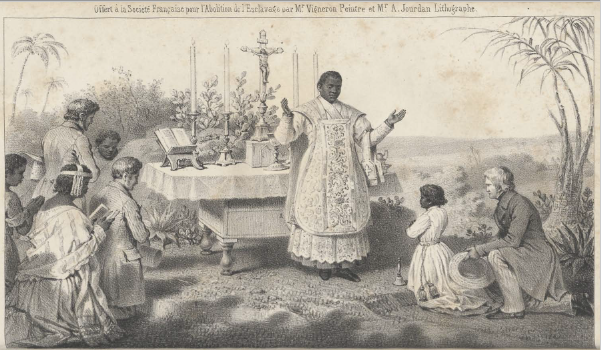
Lithograph of Moussa by A. Jourdan, 1846

Moussa and the two others were ordained as priests in 1840 by the Archbishop of Paris Denis Auguste Affre. Moussa celebrated Mass at the Palace of Fontainebleau in the presence of King Louis-Philippe and Queen Marie Amelie of Bourbon-Orléans. The Senegalese abbot received a gift that included a painting, crucifix, and candelabras from the Queen of France in 1841.

Shortly after completing his studies, he returned to Senegal on 13 April 1841. Moussa assumed duties as the interim priest at Saint-Louis. His attention later turned to aiding former slaves in Saint-Louis, Gorée, and Bathurst.

In the summer of 1846, Moussa's arrival in Paris brought joy to Javouhey, followed by visits to the nuncio, the King, the Queen, and Madame Adélaïde. He celebrated Mass using a portable altar gifted to him by Queen Marie Amelie. That year, a lithograph was created by A. Jourdan, based on a drawing by Pierre-Roch Vigneron.

In 1853, Jean-Pierre Moussa entered the service of Emperor Faustin Soulouque as a parish priest in Haiti.

== Death ==
Jean-Pierre Moussa died on 23 July 1860 in Port-au-Prince, Haiti.
