= Blood of Spain =

1979 book by Ronald Fraser

Blood of Spain: An Oral History of the Spanish Civil War
- First edition
- Author: Ronald Fraser
- Language: English
- Subject: Spanish Civil War
- Genre: Non-fiction
- Publisher: Pantheon Books
- Publication date: 1979

Blood of Spain: An Oral History of the Spanish Civil War (1979) by Ronald Fraser is an influential oral history of the Spanish Civil War.

The contents of the book is drawn from hundreds of interviews that Fraser conducted in the 1970s with people who lived through the Spanish civil war.

Favorable contemporary reviews included The New York Times Book Review, in which Paul Preston wrote that the book would "take its place among the dozen or so truly important books about the Spanish conflict," and Time magazine, whose reviewer noted, "No other volume on the Spanish Civil War can surpass the power and detail of this one."

Fellow historian Tariq Ali described Blood of Spain in Fraser's obituary as "a peerless account of the Spanish civil war, carefully constructed from interviews with participants on both sides. Conducted with a steady and consistently courteous voice, the book helped establish oral history as a discipline in its own right."

Scholar Jim Kelly described the work in a 1980 interview as a "remarkable new account of the Spanish Civil War" which "won [Fraser] recognition as one of the masters of oral history."
