= Vosnon =

Commune in Grand Est, France

- Commune
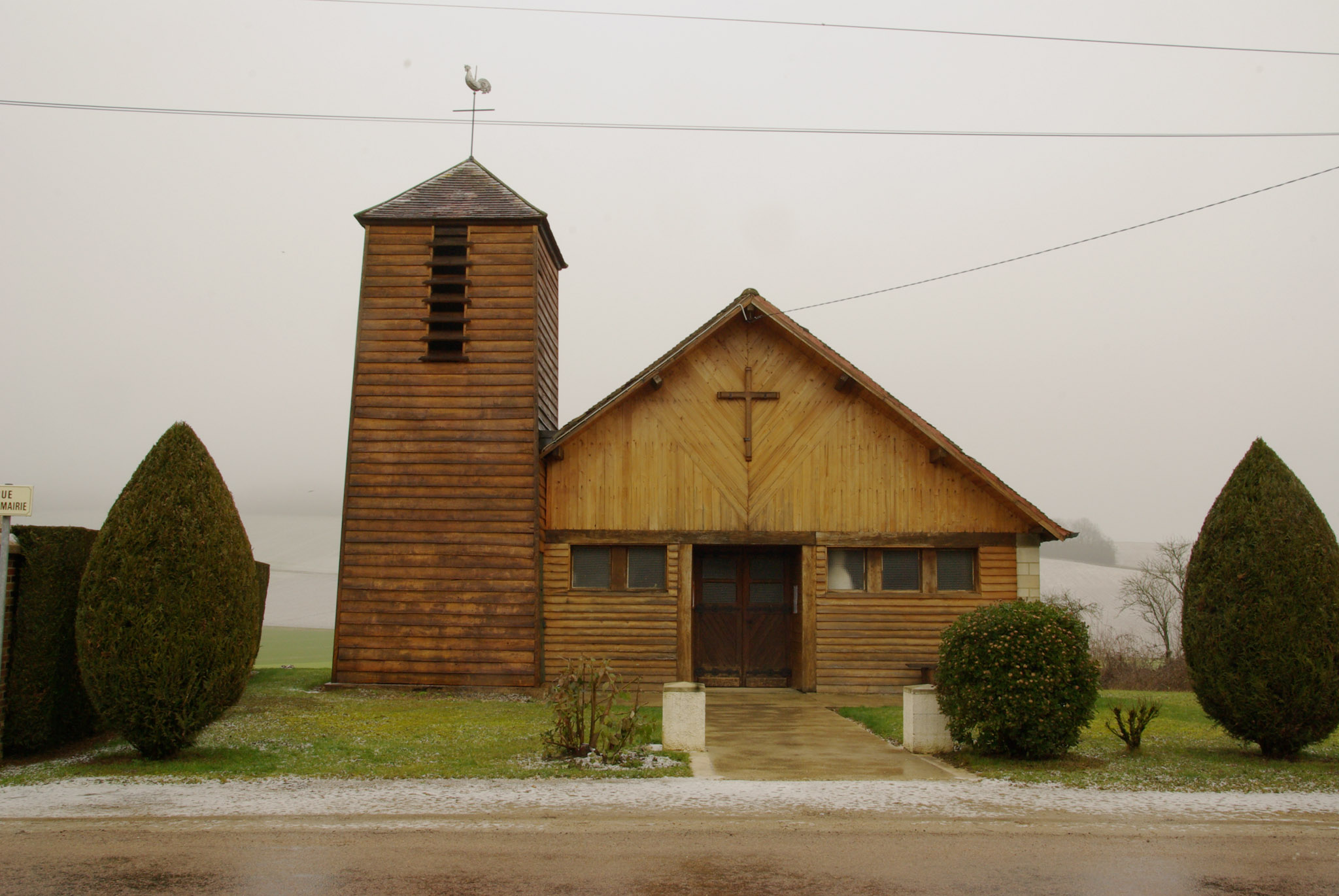
- The church in Vosnon

- Coat of arms
- Location of Vosnon
- Location within France Location within Grand Est
- Coordinates: 48°06′35″N 3°50′36″E
- Country: France
- Region: Grand Est
- Department: Aube
- Arrondissement: Troyes
- Canton: Aix-Villemaur-Pâlis
- Intercommunality: Chaourçois et Val d'Armance

Government
  - Mayor (2020–2026): Denis Pelletier
- Area^{1}: 12.83 km^{2} (4.95 sq mi)
- Elevation: 190 m (620 ft)
- Highest elevation: 300 m (980 ft)
- Lowest elevation: 158 m (518 ft)
- Population (2023): 240
  - Density: 19/km^{2} (48/sq mi)
- Time zone: UTC+01:00 (CET)
  - Summer (DST): UTC+02:00 (CEST)
- INSEE/Postal code: 10441 /10130
- ^{1} French Land Register data, which excludes lakes, ponds, glaciers > 1 km^{2} (0.386 sq mi or 247 acres) and river estuaries.

Vosnon (French pronunciation: [vonɔ̃]) is a commune in the Aube department in north-central France.

== Population ==
Historical population
Year	Pop.	±% p.a.
1968	180	—
1975	149	−2.66%
1982	114	−3.75%
1990	135	+2.14%
1999	164	+2.19%
2007	195	+2.19%
2012	223	+2.72%
2017	233	+0.88%
2023	240	+0.49%
Source: INSEE

== See also ==
- Communes of the Aube department
