= Sybella Gurney =

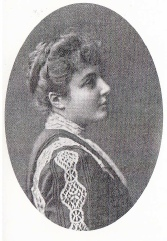
- Born: Sybella Catherine Nino Gurney; 6 July 1870; Paris, France
- Died: 11 June 1926 (aged 55); Hastings, UK
- Other names: Sybella Branford
- Education: Royal Holloway College, University of Oxford
- Occupation: Housing reformer
- Organization: Co-partnership Tenants' Housing Council (Hon. Secretary)
- Movement: Garden City Movement, Co-partnership housing movement
- Spouse: Victor Branford (m. 1910)
- Parent(s): Archer Thompson Gurney; Eliza Eleanor Hammet

Sybella Gurney (6 July 1870 – 11 June 1926) was a housing reformer and leader of the co-partnership and cooperative housing movement, who 'made important and largely unrecognized contributions to British community design theory and practice'.

== Personal life ==
Sybella Catherine Nino Gurney was born in Paris, France in 1870, the daughter of Archer Thompson Gurney, a clergyman and hymn writer, and Eliza Eleanor Hammet. She completed a college course at Oxford in literae humaniores in 1894. She then became the first librarian of the Nettleship Collection (today the library at St Anne's College, Oxford), named for Henry Nettleship. Following her death, The Sociological Review wrote that

the classical culture and ancient philosophy of [her] Oxford days remained always the substantial background of her mind. But after passing through the School of Literae Humaniores, she took up economic studies... and was deeply influenced by John Stuart Mill's plea for voluntary co-operation.

In Philadelphia in 1910, Gurney married Victor V. Branford (1864–1930), a founder in 1904 of the British Sociological Society, and editor of The Sociological Review from 1912 to his death. With him, in 1920, Gurney founded Le Play House, a centre for sociological research and study. Following their marriage, the couple lived for some time in America, before settling in Hampstead Garden Suburb. They adopted two sons, moving later to Richmond, Surrey, and ultimately to Hastings.

== Work ==
Immediately upon completing her studies at Oxford, Gurney began to focus on practical efforts towards social reform, inspired particularly by the ideas of cooperation and the work of the Labour Co-partnership Association. She worked under Leonard Hobhouse, and alongside Charlotte Toynbee. Other influences included John Ruskin, Auguste Comte, Frederic Le Play, John Stuart Mill, and Ebenezer Howard. She developed a particular interest in housing and education, town-planning and rural development, and ultimately in the concept of Garden Cities. Gurney became closely affiliated with the Garden City movement, and was actively involved in the Co-partnership housing movement.

A colleague in this, town planner Raymond Unwin, wrote of Gurney:

It was in connection with the building of cottages by the Co-partnership Tenants at Letchworth that I first came to know Sybella Gurney, and found in her a valuable ally for inoculating the housing movement with town-planning ideas. The Co-partnership enterprise, in its first development at Ealing, was of necessity an experiment in house building and collective owning. At Letchworth it came into contact with town planning, limitation of density, and large scale site-planning and development, affording quite new opportunities. To this work Miss Gurney brought a cultivated mind, having the rare capacity to see both the wood and the trees, and to realise the relation between them. While fully equipped for thinking in abstractions and taking broad and comprehensive views of life and progress, she never lost touch with the concrete. She thought (in her own phrasing) of “ the liberties we enjoy” rather than “a vague abstraction called liberty.”

Gurney was Hon. Secretary of the Co-Partnership Tenants' Housing Council, and on the Council of the National Housing Reform Council. She worked closely with Henry Vivian on housing schemes in Oldham, Letchworth, Kettering, Leicester, and the New Forest. With Henrietta Barnett, she was involved in the planning of Hampstead Garden Suburb. Matthew Wilson has situated Gurney 'as part of an idealistic circle of thinkers which included Patrick Geddes, [who] considered sociology as a means to realize complete Garden City-states based upon scientific, ethical, and participatory principles'. She was a delegate of The Ministry of Reconstruction, for whom she coordinated a ‘Women’s Sub-committee’, which investigated and advised upon local housing needs.

== Death and legacy ==
Sybella Gurney died in Hastings on 11 June 1926. Her obituary in The Times described her as 'well known during the past 20 years as an influential supporter of housing reform, and more especially as a pioneer worker in the cause of rural housing'. She was remembered as 'a woman of most unusual accomplishment, charm, and public spirit,' who was 'held in equal esteem and affection by a very large circle of friends'. The Woman's Leader remembered her as a person 'of singular vitality, versatility and charm, joined with a remarkable gift for friendship and power of inspiring others'. Patrick Geddes recalled her as 'from her youth one of those still too rare social workers who know they also need to think; and further, one of the too few thinking people who realise that the better their ideas, the more they need to be worked at, and towards useful applications'.

Gurney Drive in Hampstead Garden Suburb is named in her memory.
