= Victor Branford =

British sociologist (1863–1930)

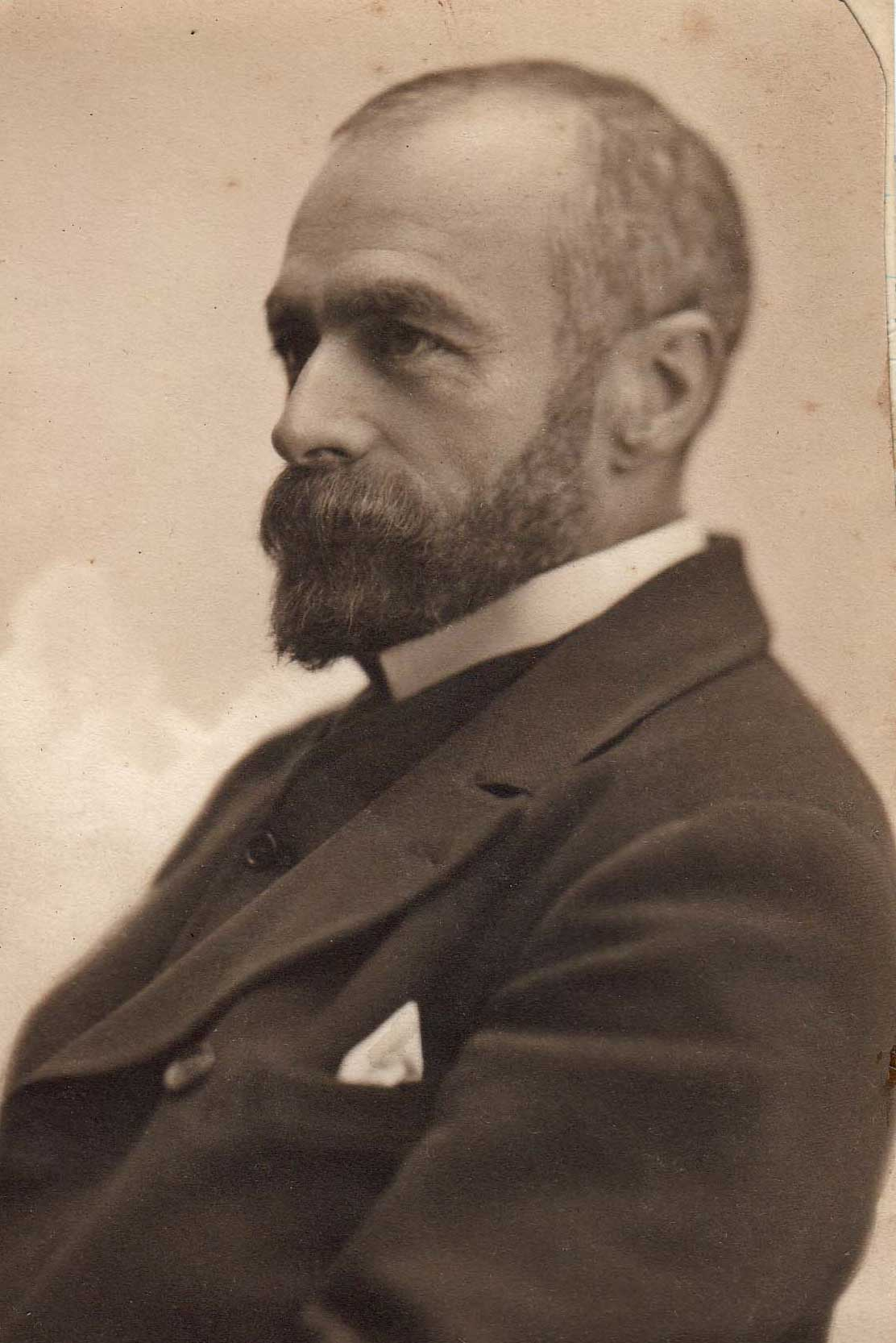
- Branford, c. 1911
- Born: 25 September 1863; Oundle, UK
- Died: 22 June 1930 (aged 66); Hastings, UK
- Education: Edinburgh University
- Known for: General Sociology; Regionalism and Social Survey; Social Reconstruction
- Spouses: Matilda Elizabeth Stewart (m. 1897; div. 1910) Sybella Gurney (m. 1910; died 1926)
- Awards: Honorary Member of the American Sociological Society, 1926
- Scientific career
- Fields: Sociology
- Workplaces: Sociological Society

Victor Verasis Branford (25 September 1863 – 22 June 1930) was a British sociologist. He was the founder of the Sociological Society and was made an Honorary member of the American Sociological Society, now the American Sociological Association.

== Life ==
Victor Verasis Branford was born in Oundle, Northamptonshire, on 25 September 1863. His father was William Catton Branford (1837–1891), who worked as a veterinary surgeon in Oundle. In addition to Victor, William Branford had one daughter and a further three sons: Mary Ann Kitchen (1861–1907), Lionel William Ernest Catton (1866–1947), Benchara Bertrand Patrick (1868–1944), and John Frederick Kitchen (1869–1946). Branford began his schooling at Oundle School, but transferred to Daniel Stewart's College when the family moved to Edinburgh in 1869 on his father's appointment as Professor of Anatomy at the veterinary college in that city.

While studying at Edinburgh University, Victor Branford came under the influence of Patrick Geddes, who was working as a demonstrator in the science faculty at the university. This contact with Geddes changed the direction of his life and led to his lifelong commitment to the development of sociology.

Working as a journalist in Dundee he met Matilda Elizabeth Stewart (1852–1915), widow of James Farquharson Stewart the editor of the "Dundee Advertiser", and the two were married in 1897. The Branfords lived in Amersham while Victor was working as an accountant in London, but the marriage did not last and Branford secured a divorce under American law in Goldfield, Nevada, in 1910. Branford had already met Sybella Gurney, an activist in the cooperative movement and the Garden Cities movement, and they were married in Philadelphia that same year.

When not in the United States, the Branfords lived in Hampstead Garden Suburb, where Gurney Drive was later named in memory of Sybella's involvement in the building of the Suburb. In 1912 they adopted two boys from a family unable to look after them and the boys were named as Archer Robert Branford and Hugh Sydney Branford. The family moved to Richmond, Surrey, in 1920, taking a summer home at New Milton, Hampshire, and in 1921 they settled in Hastings. Both Victor and Sybella experienced serious illnesses during the 1920s. Sybella died in 1926 and Victor in 1930.

Branford's sister Mary became an actress and married the stage and film actor Joseph Frederick Powell, known professionally as Joynson Powell and who appeared in Alfred Hitchcock's Murder (1930). Lionel and John both entered the Church, while Benchara was principal of Sunderland Technical College (now the University of Sunderland) and then Divisional Inspector for Mathematics at the London County Council. Mary's son Frederick Victor Branford became a significant war poet.

== Business interests and career ==
Branford's brief career in journalism was followed by the formation of an accountancy partnership with John Ross, another former student of Geddes's. Working from offices in Edinburgh and London, Branford and Ross sought both to manage the chaotic finances of Patrick Geddes and to build up a viable business. In 1905 he came into contact with a group of Argentine businessmen associated with the Argentine North Eastern Railway and its expansion into Paraguay. At the same time, he became involved in the financing of telephone and railway interests in Cuba.

Business interests meant that he worked from offices in London, New York, and Paraguay throughout the period from 1907 to 1914. It was in this period that his Argentine connections drew him into the business world of Percival Farquhar, who was expanding his railway interests across Latin America. The collapse of the Farquhar group in 1914 brought Branford into contact with Bernhard Binder and the two worked together to reconstruct the viable companies. He joined Binder and Ralph Hamlyn in the formation of Binder Hamlyn, now BDO International, in 1918.

== Promoting sociology and the Sociological Society ==
Victor Branford's involvement in sociology came about through his collaboration with Patrick Geddes in a series of summer schools held in Edinburgh from 1892 to 1895 and associated with his work at the Outlook Tower. With Geddes, Branford first sought to establish a Geographical Institute, but soon recast this as an Edinburgh School of Sociology. As both became more involved in business and intellectual activities in London, they proposed the establishment of a Sociological Society in 1903, drawing on finance from Geddes's friend and supporter the Scottish politician Martin White. The Society brought together the regional and civic interests of Geddes with supporters of Eugenics and a diverse array of social scientists, philosophers, and politicians. It led to the publication of the Sociological Review and the production of series of pamphlets and books.

The Society had an uneasy relationship with the professional sociology that emerged at the London School of Economics under the leadership of Leonard Trelawny Hobhouse and Morris Ginsberg. Following the deaths of Branford and Geddes the Society became largely moribund and, under the umbrella of the Institute of Sociology, its activities were wound down. Its archives were transferred to Keele University.

== Sociological views ==
Branford and Geddes worked together to develop a view of sociology rooted in the ideas of Auguste Comte and Frédéric Le Play. Where Geddes concentrated on civic and regional issues, Branford focused more on the ‘pure sociology’ of general theory. They allied this with a Comtean view of the role of sociology in social reconstruction and promoted a politics of the ‘Third Alternative’ between liberalism and collectivism.

== Major publications ==
- Branford, Victor 1903. On the origin and use of the word ‘sociology’ and on the relationship of sociological to other studies and to practical problems. American Journal of Sociology 9, 2: 145–62.
- Branford, Victor 1904. The founders of sociology. American Journal of Sociology 10, 1: 94–126.
- Branford, Victor 1912. St. Columba: A Study of Social Inheritance and Spiritual Development. Edinburgh: Patrick Geddes and Colleagues.
- Branford, Victor 1914 Interpretations and Forecasts: A Study of the Survivals and Tendencies in Contemporary Societies, New York, Mitchell Kennerley.
- Branford, Victor 1923. Science and Sanctity: A Study in the Scientific Approach to Unity. London: Le Play House Press and Williams and Norgate.
- Branford, Victor 1924. Living Religions: A Plea For the Larger Modernism. London: Williams and Norgate.
- Branford, Victor and Geddes, Patrick 1917. The Coming Polity. London: Williams and Norgate.
- Branford, Victor and Geddes, Patrick 1919. Our Social Inheritance. London: Williams and Norgate.
