= Charlotte Toynbee =

British college administrator and local government official

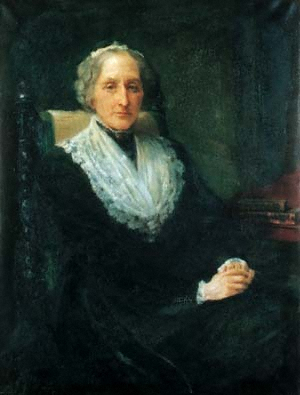
- Charlotte Toynbee in 1908 by Anna Lea Merritt
- Born: Charlotte Maria Atwood; 30 March 1841; Muswell Hill, Buckinghamshire
- Died: 8 January 1931 (aged 89); Oxford
- Education: French schools and London
- Occupation: college administrator
- Spouse: Arnold Toynbee
- Children: none

Charlotte Maria Toynbee, born Charlotte Maria Atwood (30 March 1841 – 8 January 1931) was a British college administrator and local government official. The Toynbee Building at Lady Margaret Hall recognises her contribution to women's education at Oxford.

== Life ==
Toynbee was born in Muswell Hill, Buckinghamshire in 1841. Her parents were Charlotte Maria (born Hodgskins) and William Atwood. Her father was a linguist working abroad so consequentially she spent a lot of time out of the country gaining her education in French schools until her family returned to the UK. Her Anglican and Liberal family then lived in Wimbledon and she went to school in London. She spoke slowly and kindly, but she was said to have a commanding voice.

When she was 32 she married a man who was eleven years younger than her who she had known for six years. She had been initially attracted to Arnold Toynbee by his ideas. He was still a student at Oxford University when they met. He had switched colleges and gained Benjamin Jowett as a supporter, but he took a pass degree because of his ill-health. Despite this he was a tutor at Oxford.

Her husband died prematurely in 1883 of meningitis and later that year she volunteered to be the treasurer of Lady Margaret Hall. They had no children. In 1884, she and her mother moved into a new house and she and Alfred Milner edited her husband's Lectures on the Industrial Revolution in England. She also served on the committee aiming to create a settlement in Oxford, the result, Toynbee Hall, was named for her husband. Other notable members of the co-operative movement in Oxford included Sybella Gurney who was brought in by Toynbee. Gurney worked with Leonard Trelawny Hobhouse.

Toynbee served as Poor Law Guardian for thirty years as part of a system which she wanted replaced. She said that it was impossible to judge the level of help that the poor needed and it was demeaning for them to ask for small sums. She wanted to see the system replaced with pensions and other improvements.

Toynbee looked after the management, and contributed to, the finances of Lady Margaret Hall (LMH) for forty years. LMH supplied a home for women students as they studied. However she did not approve of women being given the vote and in 1895 she was one of the LMH council members who successfully opposed the idea that women should be awarded BA degrees at Oxford.

== Death and legacy ==
In 1915 Lady Margaret Hall honoured her by naming one of their new buildings, Toynbee Building, after her. In 1921 her friends gave £600 to LMH in her honour. Toynbee left a bequest to LMH when she died in Oxford in 1931 to build a chapel. She was buried in Oxford's St Sepulchre's Cemetery, which was overcrowded decades before. Toynbee Building was a listed building in 1954.
