= Alasdair Alpin MacGregor =

Scottish writer and animal rights activist

- MacGregor performing the stone put at Crogary More, North Uist, 1934
- Born: March 20, 1899; Applecross
- Died: April 15, 1970 (aged 71); London
- Occupation: Writer

Alasdair Alpin MacGregor (March 20, 1899 – April 15, 1970) was a Scottish writer, animal welfare campaigner and photographer, known for a large number of travel books. He wrote also on Scottish folklore, and was a published poet.

== Biography ==
MacGregor was born at Applecross, Ross and Cromarty, on 20 March 1899, the son of Colonel John MacGregor M.D. of the Indian Medical Service. He was educated at Tain Academy in Inverness, George Watson's College and Edinburgh University. He took an arts degree at Edinburgh University. During World War I he served with the 15th Scottish Division in the trenches in France. He was a writer for the magazine Country Life and was a correspondent for The Times for the evacuation of St Kilda in 1930.

He spent much of his life as a freelance photographer and writer of Scotland. His books were mainly about Hebrides and Western Isles. His romanticising style incurred the displeasure of Compton Mackenzie, who caricatured him in some of his novels. Judging by the title of the 1931 book A Last Voyage to St. Kilda. Being the Observations and Adventures of an Egotistic Private Secretary who was alleged to have been 'warned off' That Island by Admiralty Officials when attempting to emulate Robinson Crusoe at the Time of Its Evacuation there might have been something to caricature. In partial explanation, St Kilda was evacuated in 1930; at the time he was Private Secretary to the Chancellor of the Duchy of Lancaster. The same book was the subject of a legal case when MacGregor brought an injunction to prevent the distribution of The Edge of the World, a film by Michael Powell that he claimed was based on it. MacGregor lost the case.

He lived in London for most of his adult life in Swan Court and Upper Cheyne Row, Chelsea. Along with T. Ratcliffe Barnett, an Edinburgh minister and author, MacGregor reflects a transitional period during the first half of the 20th century when the north of Scotland was still rural and mostly unaffected by modern society.

In the years before his death in 1970, he visited the United States often and was a mentor to a young Marion Barry, who later became mayor of Washington, D.C.

His book about his childhood, The Goat Wife, tells the evocative story of his hard working and resourceful Aunt Dorothy, who left a comfortable existence in Edinburgh's Ann Street - reputed to be the most haunted street in Edinburgh - to begin life as a solo crofter in the Easter Ross village of Ardgay (then known locally as "High Wind"). Spanning the period before the First World War until the end of the Second, it captures the last remnants of the simplicity, privations and charm of Scottish rural community life. The "Victor" in the book is the poet Frederick Victor Branford.

MacGregor was described as a "vegetarian, teetotaller, and uncompromising and active anti-vivisectionist".

== The Western Isles ==
MacGregor caused controversy with his book The Western Isles (1949) which accused modern islanders of being drunkards, greedy, lazy and immoral. In November, 1949 complaints were sent to the publisher requesting for the book to be withdrawn. James S. Grant editor of the Stornoway Gazette denounced the statements in the book as "vile and false". MacGregor had claimed that his book was based on facts and dared anyone to question them. In response, Grant challenged MacGregor to produce evidence in support of his statements. Grant commented that "this is a matter which affects the good name of the whole Highlands".

In 1949, The Lewis Association published a booklet titled The Western Isles: A Critical Analysis of the Book of that Name by Alasdair Alpin MacGregor to counter the attack on the people of the Hebrides.

== Animal welfare ==
MacGregor was a campaigner against cruelty to animals, including vivisection and hunting for sport. In 1929, MacGregor returned his graduation diplomas to Edinburgh University and requested for his name to be erased from the alumni register in protest of the University's vivisection activities. In 1930, MacGregor challenged Edward Albert Sharpey-Schafer to a public debate on the ethics of vivisection.

MacGregor was president of the League for the Prohibition of Cruel Sports. He resigned in 1934. He was a vegetarian who argued that animal-lovers should not eat meat. MacGregor attended meetings of the National Equine Defence League.

=== Dispute with the RSPCA ===
MacGregor criticized the RSPCA for its non-opposition to blood sports such as fox-hunting. The RSPCA had refused to oppose hunting out of risk of losing its wealthiest supporters. Macgregor alleged that the governing body of the RSPCA had introduced a secret expulsion from their society where "undesirable" members could be expelled.

He was involved in a feud with Robert Gower and in July 1931 they were both involved in an incident at the annual meeting of the RSPCA. MacGregor filed a charge of assault against Gower. MacGregor alleged that Gower the chairman of the meeting ordered six uniformed attendants under his control to remove him from the hall with far more force than was necessary and that he was assaulted in the process whilst Gower made no attempt to stop it. According to MacGregor the attendants attacked him from behind, held him by the throat and hurled him out of the hall. The magistrate dismissed the summons brought by MacGregor against Gower. It was agreed that a considerable amount of force had been used to eject MacGegor from the hall but there was no suggestion that Sir Robert had assaulted MacGregor personally.

== Death ==
MacGregor died on April 15, 1970 in London. Following his wishes, his photographic collection and published works were donated to the National Museums by his widow in 1970. His personal papers are stored by the National Library of Scotland.

== Publications ==
- Behold the Hebrides! (First published 1925, Revised Edition 1948)
- Over the Sea to Skye: Or, Ramblings in an Elfin Isle (1926)
- Wild Drumalban or the Road to Meggernie and Glencoe (1927)
- Summer Days Among The Western Isles (1929)
- A Last Voyage To St. Kilda (1931)
- Searching the Hebrides With a Camera (1933)
- The Haunted Isles: Or, Life in the Hebrides (1933)
- The Peat-Fire Flame: Folk-tales and Traditions of the Highlands and Islands (1937)
- The Goat Wife: Portrait of a Village (1939)
- Vanished Waters: Portrait of a Highland Childhood (1946)
- The Western Isles (1949)
- Skye and the Outer Hebrides (1953)
- Auld Reekie: Portrait of a Lowland Boyhood (1943)
- The Ghost Book: Strange Hauntings in Britain (1955)
- The Turbulent Years: A Portrait of Youth in Auld Reekie (1945)
- Journeyman Taylor: The Education of a Scientist (1958, rewrite of the Thomas Griffith Taylor autobiography)
- Phantom Footsteps: A Second Ghost Book (1959)
- Percyval Tudor-Hart: Portrait of an Artist (1961)
- The Golden Lamp: Portrait of a Landlady (1964)
- Land of the Mountain and the Flood (1965)
- The Enchanted Isles (1967)
- The Farthest Hebrides (1969)
- Islands by the Score (1971)
