= Ebenezer Howard =

British writer, founder of the garden city movement (1850–1928)

Sir Ebenezer Howard OBE
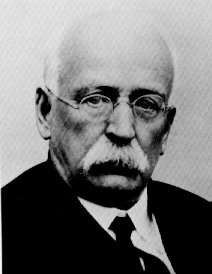
- Born: 29 January 1850; London, England
- Died: 1 May 1928 (aged 78); Welwyn Garden City, Hertfordshire, England
- Known for: Founder of the garden city movement in England
- Notable work: To-Morrow: A Peaceful Path to Real Reform
- Spouses: Eliza Ann Bills (1879–1904, her death); Edith Annie Hayward (m. 1907)
- Relatives: Geoffrey Howard (grandson); Una Stubbs (great-granddaughter); Christian Henson (great-great-grandson)

Sir Ebenezer Howard (29 January 1850 – 1 May 1928) was an English urban planner and founder of the garden city movement, known for his publication To-Morrow: A Peaceful Path to Real Reform (1898), the description of a utopian city in which people live harmoniously together with nature. The publication resulted in the founding of the garden city movement, and the building of the first garden city, Letchworth Garden City, commenced in 1903.

The second true Garden City was Welwyn Garden City (1920) and the movement influenced the development of several model suburbs in other countries, such as Forest Hills Gardens designed by F. L. Olmsted Jr. in 1909, Radburn, New Jersey (1923), Pinelands, Cape Town, and the four Suburban Resettlement Program towns of the 1930s, Greenbelt, Maryland, Greenhills, Ohio, Greenbrook, New Jersey, and Greendale, Wisconsin.

Howard aimed to reduce the alienation of humans and society from nature, and hence advocated garden cities and Georgism. Howard is believed by many to be one of the great guides to the town planning movement, with many of his garden city principles being used in modern town planning.

== Early life ==
Howard was born in Fore Street, City of London, the son of Ebenezer Howard (1817–1900), a baker, and Ann (née Tow, 1816–1900). He was sent to schools in Suffolk and Hertfordshire. Howard left school at 15 and began working as a stenographer in London. Howard subsequently had several clerical jobs, including one with Dr Parker of the City Temple.

In 1871, at the age of 21, influenced partly by a farming uncle, Howard emigrated with two friends to America. He went to Nebraska, and after his farming efforts failed, discovered he did not wish to be a farmer. He then relocated to Chicago and worked as a reporter for the courts and newspapers. Howard arrived in Chicago just after the great fire of 1871, which destroyed most of the central business district, and witnessed the regeneration of the city and the growth of its suburbs. In the US he became acquainted with, and admired, poets Walt Whitman and Ralph Waldo Emerson. Howard began to ponder ways to improve the quality of life.

== Later life ==
By 1876, he was back in England, where he found a job with Hansard company, which produces the official verbatim record of Parliament, and he spent the rest of his life in this occupation. Howard's time in parliament exposed him to ideas about social reform, and helped inspire his ideas for the Garden City. In August 1879, he married Eliza Ann Bills. Sociologist Brett Clark describes Howard as a "humble and practical" inventor who used his spare time to create outlines of new cities. It was the social milieu of the 1800s which led Howard to consider the social problems of the time and try to find alternatives. Howard mingled with free thinkers, anarchists and socialists, whose revolutionary and reforming ideas greatly influenced him.

Howard's parents died on consecutive days in 1900, after he had published the first edition of his book, but before work had started on the first garden city: his mother died on 23 November 1900 from pneumonia and his father died on 24 November 1900 from gastritis.

Howard's wife, Eliza Ann Bills (1853–1904), died in November 1904, shortly after work on the first garden city at Letchworth had begun. Howard married again in 1907 to Edith Annie Hayward (1864–1941), who became Edith, Lady Howard when Howard was knighted in 1927, and with whom he is buried in Letchworth Cemetery.

== Influences and ideas ==
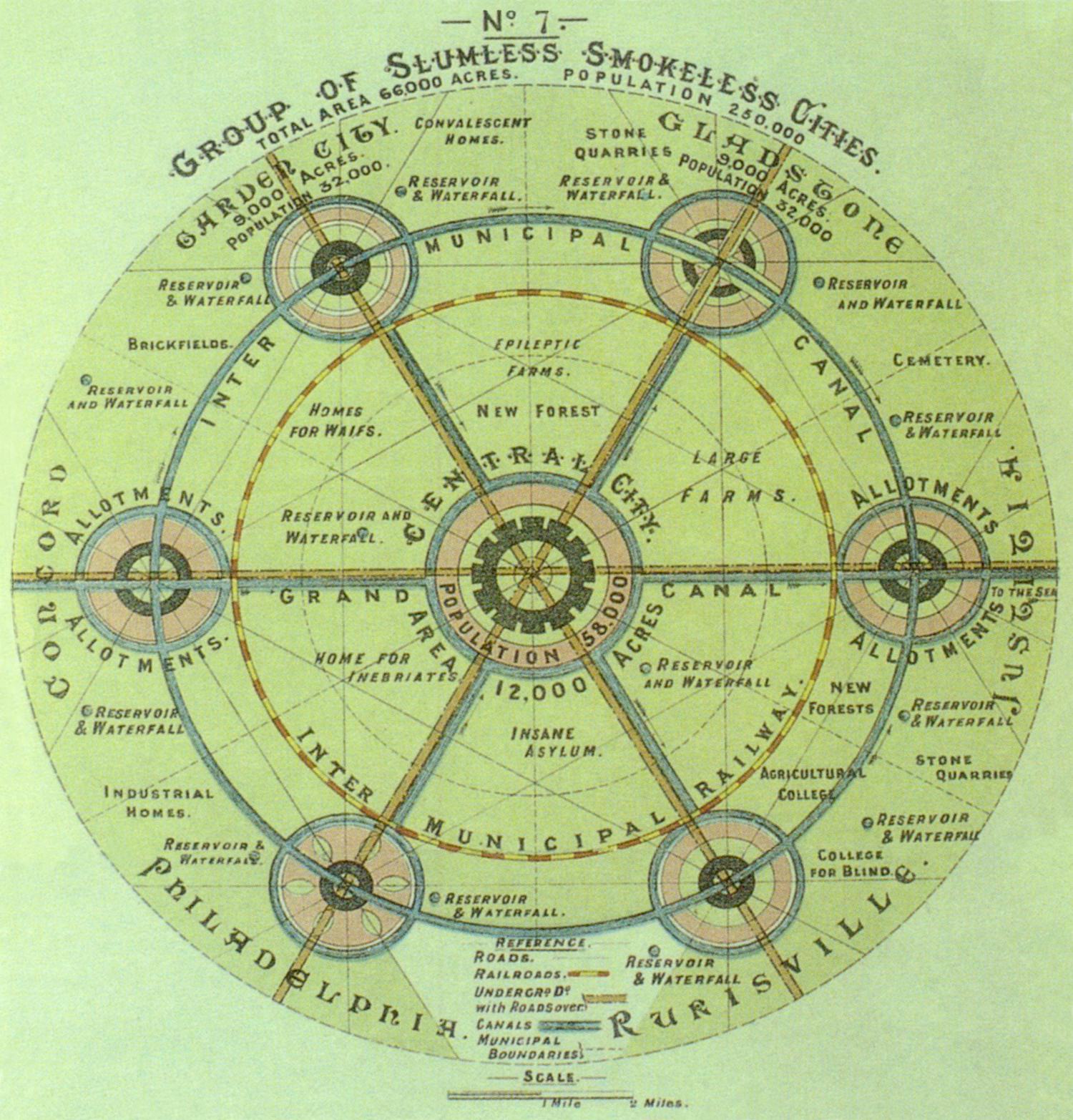
The original Garden City concept by Ebenezer Howard, 1902.

Howard read widely, including Edward Bellamy's 1888 utopian novel, Looking Backward, and Henry George's economic treatise, Progress and Poverty, and thought much about social issues. He disliked the way modern cities were being developed and thought people should live in places that should combine the best aspects of both cities and the countryside.

== Publications ==
The only publication he wrote in his life was titled To-Morrow: A Peaceful Path to Real Reform, which was significantly revised in 1902 as Garden Cities of To-morrow. Garden Cities of To-morrow was based on ideas of social and urban reform. Garden Cities were to avoid the downfalls of industrial cities of the time such as urban poverty, overcrowding, low wages, dirty alleys with no drainage, poorly ventilated houses, toxic substances, dust, carbon gases, infectious disease and lack of interaction with nature. This book offered a vision of towns free of slums and enjoying the benefits of both town (such as opportunity, amusement and good wages) and country (such as beauty, fresh air and low rents). He illustrated the idea with his famous Three Magnets diagram (pictured), which addressed the question 'Where will the people go?', the choices being 'Town', 'Country' or 'Town-Country'.

Garden Cities of Tomorrow proposed that society be reorganised with networks of garden cities that would break the strong hold of capitalism and lead to cooperative socialism. It proposed the creation of new suburban towns of limited size, planned in advance, and surrounded by a permanent belt of agricultural land.

These Garden cities were used as the model for many suburbs. Howard believed that such Garden Cities were the perfect blend of city and nature. Howard believed that a new civilisation could be found by marrying the town and the country. The towns would be largely independent, managed by the citizens who had an economic interest in them, and financed by ground rents on the Georgist model. The land on which they were to be built was to be owned by a group of trustees and leased to the citizens.

While many believe the diagrams and designs in Howard's Garden Cities of Tomorrow to be a physical plan for the perfect garden city, Howard notes these to be merely suggestive as each city should be planned to be organised as per the needs of the people and their environment. Howard never intended for garden cities to be circular like his diagrams.

== Action ==
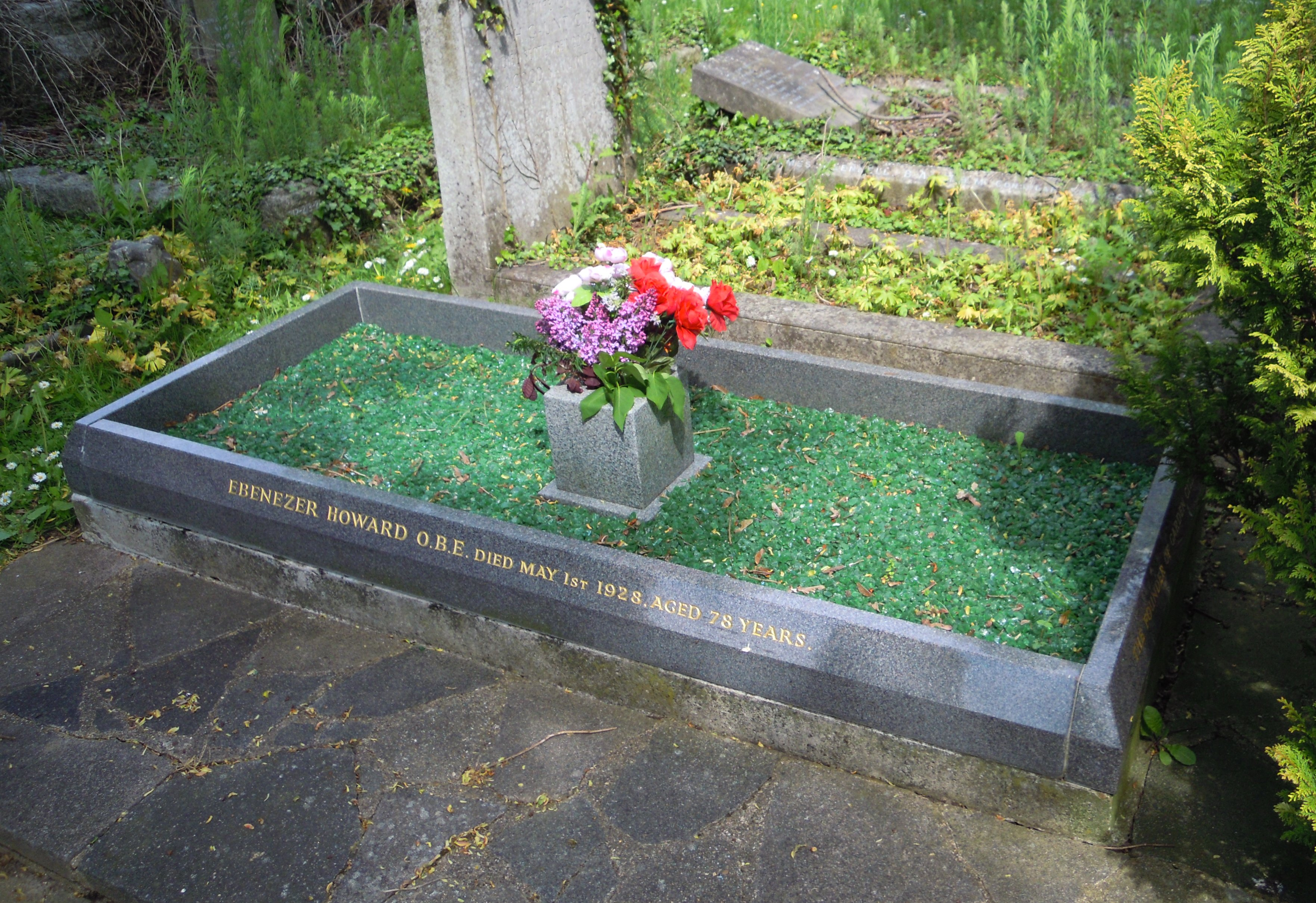
The grave of Ebenezer Howard in Letchworth Cemetery

In 1899, he founded the Garden Cities Association, known now as the Town and Country Planning Association.

By his association with Henry Harvey Vivian and the co-partnership housing movement, his ideas attracted enough attention and funding to begin Letchworth Garden City, a suburban garden city 37 miles (60 km) north of London. In 1901, under the guidance of Henry Vivian, a new co-partnership housing development venture was started in the London Borough of Ealing that was to become the Brentham Garden Suburb, now a conservation area. A second garden city, Welwyn Garden City, was started after World War I.

His acquaintance with German architects Hermann Muthesius and Bruno Taut resulted in the application of humane design principles in many large housing projects built in the Weimar Republic. Hermann Muthesius also played an important role in the creation of Germany's first garden city of Hellerau in 1909, the only German garden city where Howard's ideas were thoroughly adopted.

The creation of Letchworth Garden City and Welwyn Garden City were influential for the development of "New Towns" after World War II by the British government. This produced more than 30 communities, the first being Stevenage, Hertfordshire (about halfway between Letchworth and Welwyn), and the last (and largest) being Milton Keynes, Buckinghamshire. Howard's ideas also influenced other planners such as Frederick Law Olmsted II and Clarence Perry. Walt Disney used elements of Howard's concepts in his original design for EPCOT (Experimental Prototype Community of Tomorrow).

In 1913, Howard founded the 'Garden Cities and Town Planning Association' – presently the International Federation for Housing and Planning.

== Personal Life & Death ==
Howard was an enthusiastic speaker of Esperanto, often using the language for his speeches.

=== Death ===
Howard died on 1 May 1928 (aged 78) and is buried in a modest grave in Letchworth Cemetery with his second wife, Edith Annie, Lady Howard.

== Letchworth Garden City ==
Letchworth was developed and owned by a company called First Garden City, Ltd. which was formed in 1903, based on the ideas of Howard. After Howard's book was published he worked to gain financial support to bring his ideas into reality, Howard ran lectures on Garden Cities and began the Garden City Association. The Garden City Association collected money from supporters, his supporters tended to be people who were impressed by the social justice element of the Garden City. The Letchworth estate which was agricultural land, was purchased from 15 individual owners. The Letchworth estate lies on a train line and is only 35 miles (56 km) from London, making commuting possible.

The original land on which Letchworth was built cost the First Garden City, Ltd. £160,378 and covered 3,826 acres (1,548 ha). However, more land was purchased and the property increased to 4,710 acres (1,910 ha). The Letchworth garden city was to sustain a population of between 30,000 and 35,000 people, and would be laid out as Howard explained in his book. There would be a central town, agricultural belt, shops, factories, residences, civic centres and open spaces, this division of land for specific purposes is now referred to as zoning and is an important practice within town planning.

Howard constructed Letchworth as an example of how the Garden City could be achieved, and hoped that in its success many other towns would be built emulating the same ideals. Some criticisms of Letchworth exist, claims that it is too spacious and there are few architecturally impressive designs. However, it can be argued the space is what makes Letchworth pleasant, and the architecture, while not highly impressive and uniform, has consistency of colour and is satisfying to the needs of the people.

== Welwyn Garden City ==
Welwyn Garden City was an area of woodlands and open fields before the garden city was constructed. Welwyn Garden City was Howard's second Garden City after Letchworth. Howard purchased the land with £5000 borrowed from friends. Welwyn Garden City is only 20 miles (32 km) from London, and captured the charm of the countryside and managed to stay unspoiled by urbanisation. The architecture in Welwyn has been described as pleasant, and the residential cottages with their wide roads and open spaces make Welwyn Garden City a refreshing picture when compared to London of the time.

After 10 years of existence, Welwyn Garden City had a population of 10,000, with well-established residential, industrial and commercial zones. In 1930, the health of Welwyn Garden City inhabitants was considered greater than those living in London, as Welwyn Garden City recorded lower death rates and infant mortality rates. The increased health in Welwyn Garden City was understood to be due to the principles of the Garden City.

It could be argued that Welwyn Garden City fell short of Howard's ideals, Howard wanted investors to invest for the sake of philanthropy, but investors wanted returns and local democracy failed with an exclusive government group formed. Finally, Welwyn Garden City was marketed as a middle class commuter suburb, entirely disrespecting the garden city ideals of a self-reliant city.

== Honours ==
Howard was appointed an Officer of the Order of the British Empire in 1924 and a Knight Bachelor in 1927.

== Howard Medal ==
The Howard medal was introduced after Howard's death, and takes the form of a bronze medal with the motif of an ideal city. The medal remains one of the most prestigious awards in the sector.

In almost 90 years, the medal has been awarded 11 times and the names are a stellar cast of Garden City giants beginning with Raymond Unwin in 1938 and ending with Colin Ward and Sir Peter Hall in 1999. It includes Barry Parker, Lewis Mumford, Clarence Stein, Richard Reiss, Patrick Abercrombie and Frederic Osborn but only one woman, Elizabeth Buchanan Mitchell in 1955.

== Family members ==
Actress, dancer and TV personality Una Stubbs was Howard's great-granddaughter. Other direct descendants include his cricket manager grandson Geoffrey Howard, great-granddaughter poet and publisher Joy Bernadine Howard, and his great-great-grandson (Una Stubbs's son), television and film score composer Christian Henson.

== Diagrams from the 1898 edition ==
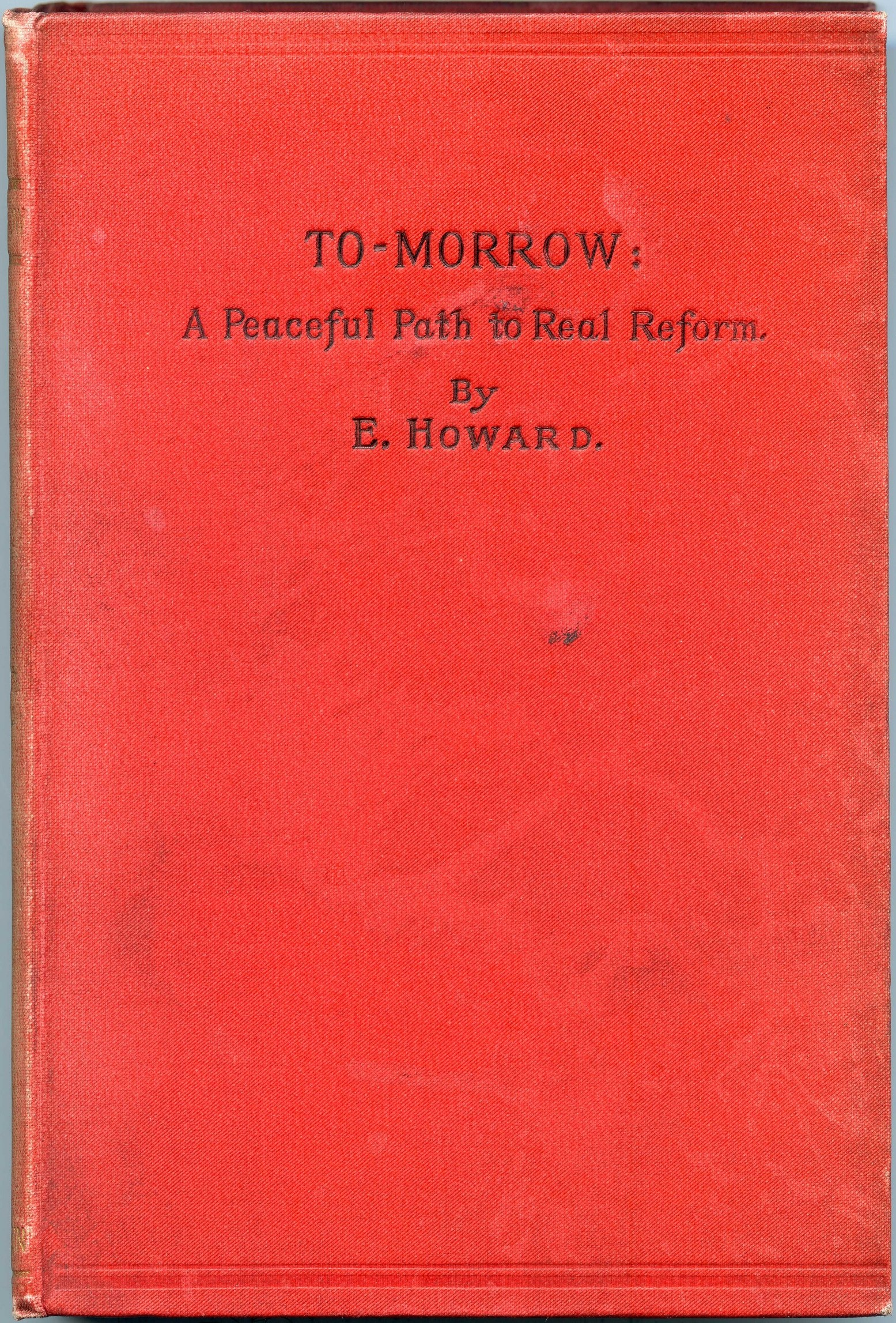
Ebenezer Howard, To-morrow: A Peaceful Path to Real Reform.

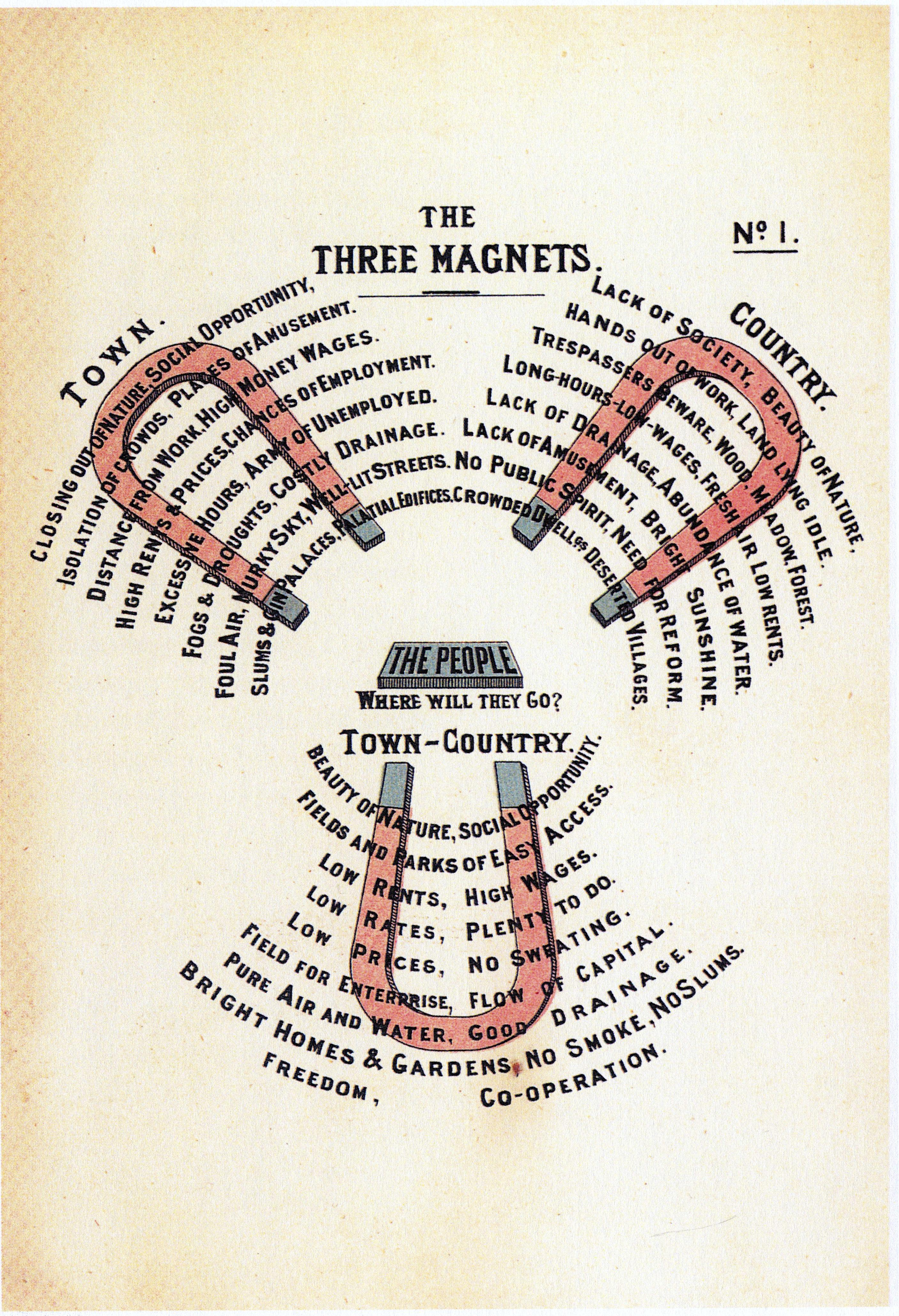
Diagram No.1: The Three Magnets (Ebenezer Howard, To-morrow: A Peaceful Path to Real Reform.)

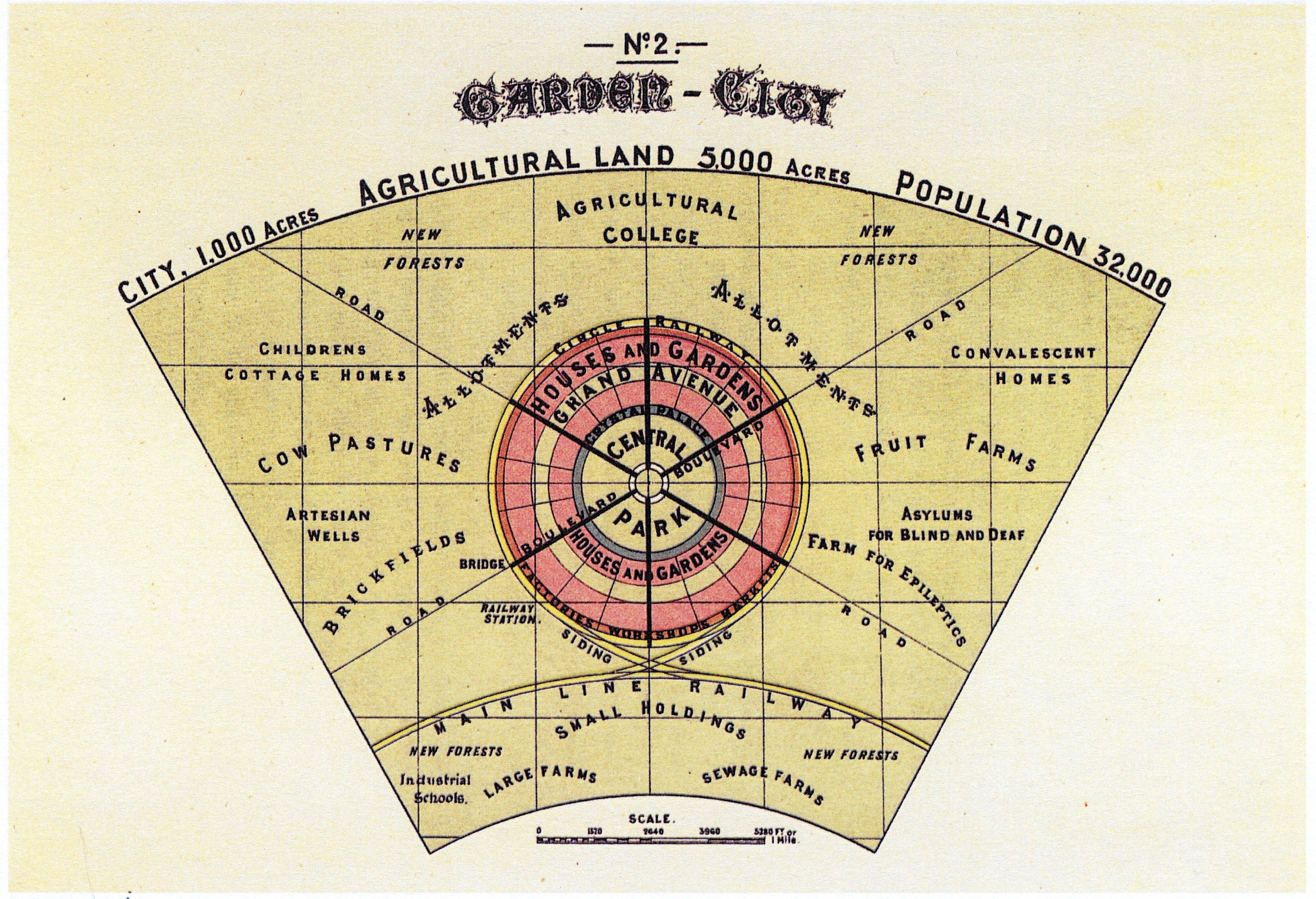
Diagram No.2 (Ebenezer Howard, To-morrow: A Peaceful Path to Real Reform.)

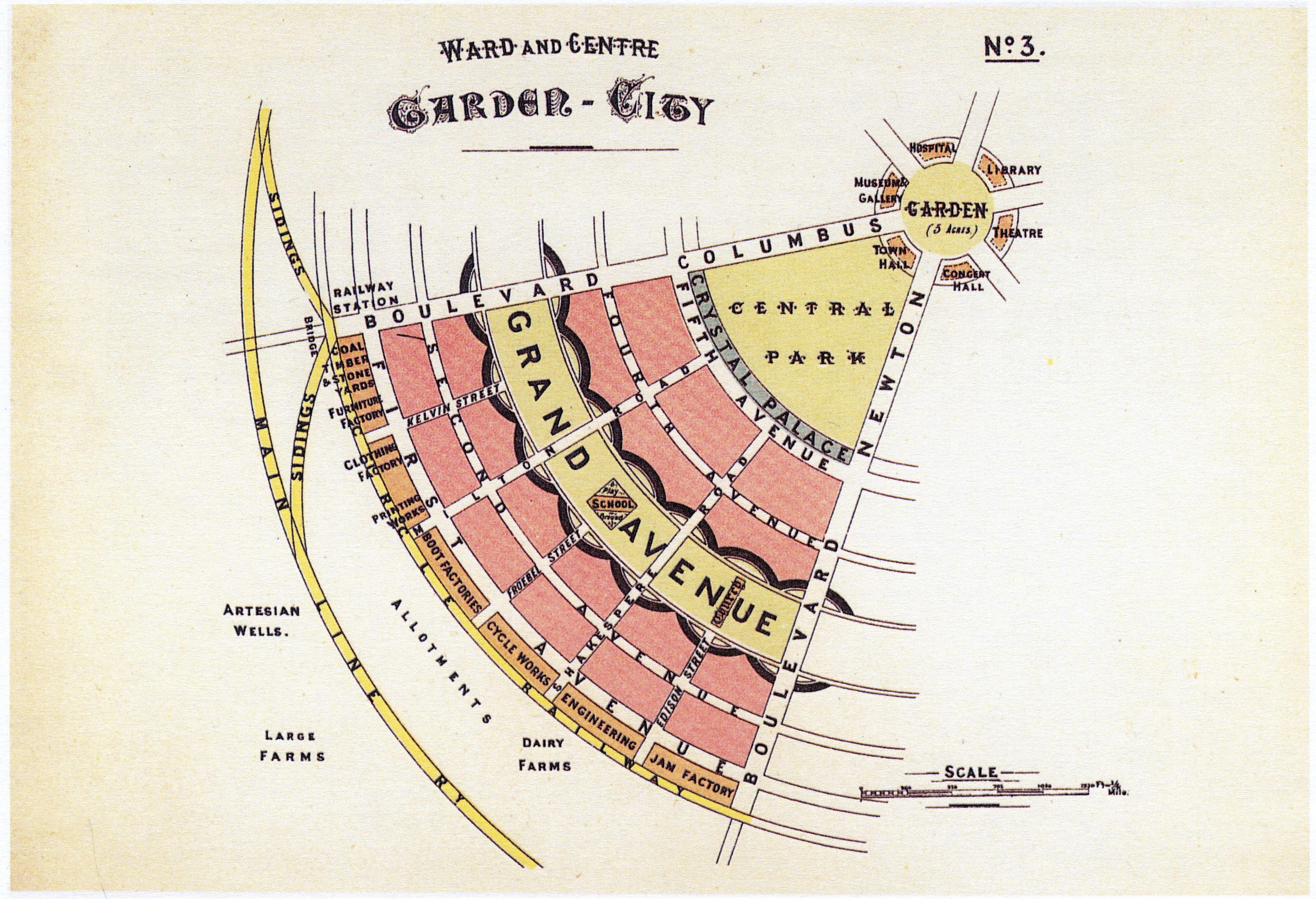
Diagram No.3 (Ebenezer Howard, To-morrow: A Peaceful Path to Real Reform.)

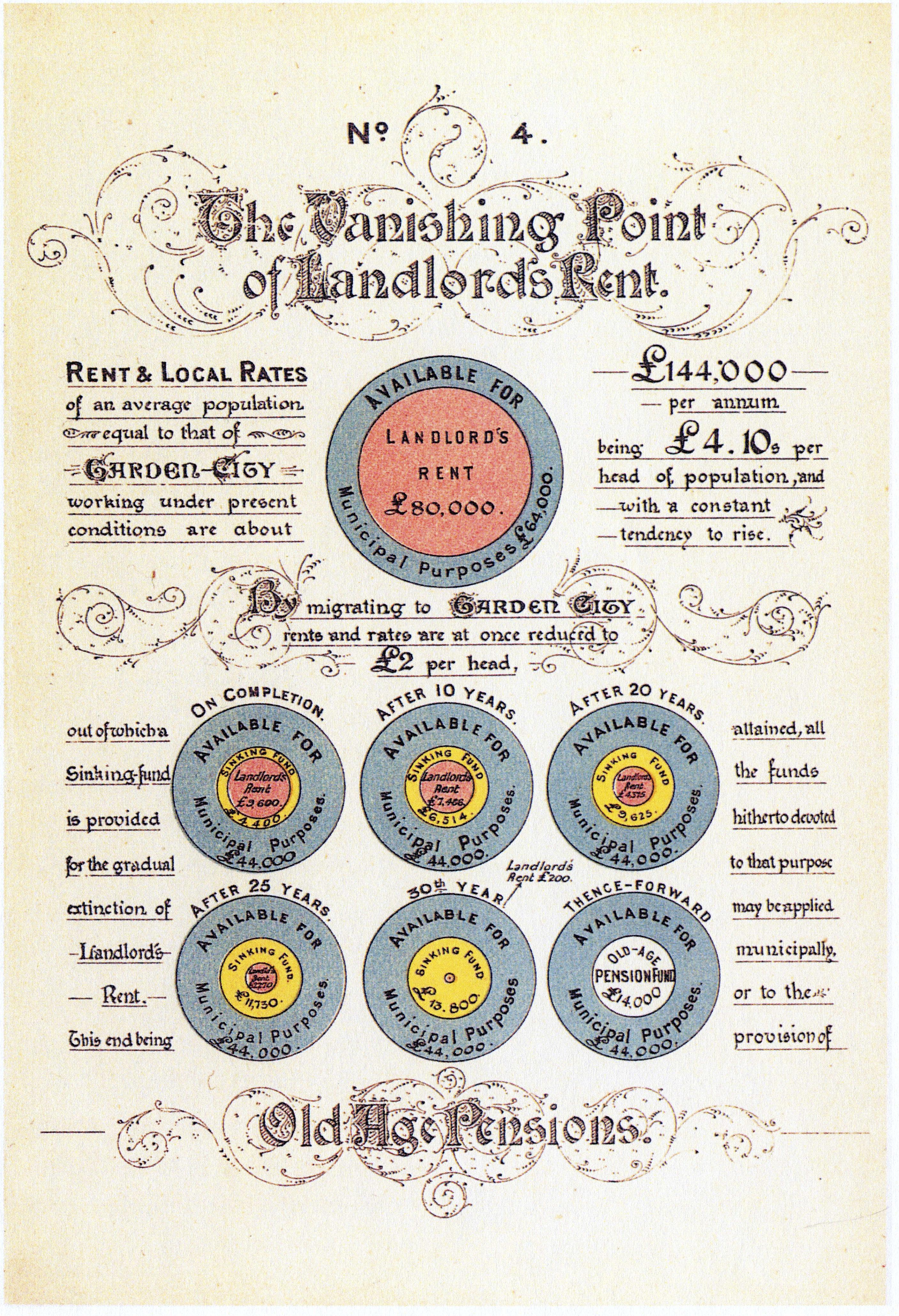
Diagram No.4 (Ebenezer Howard, To-morrow: A Peaceful Path to Real Reform.)

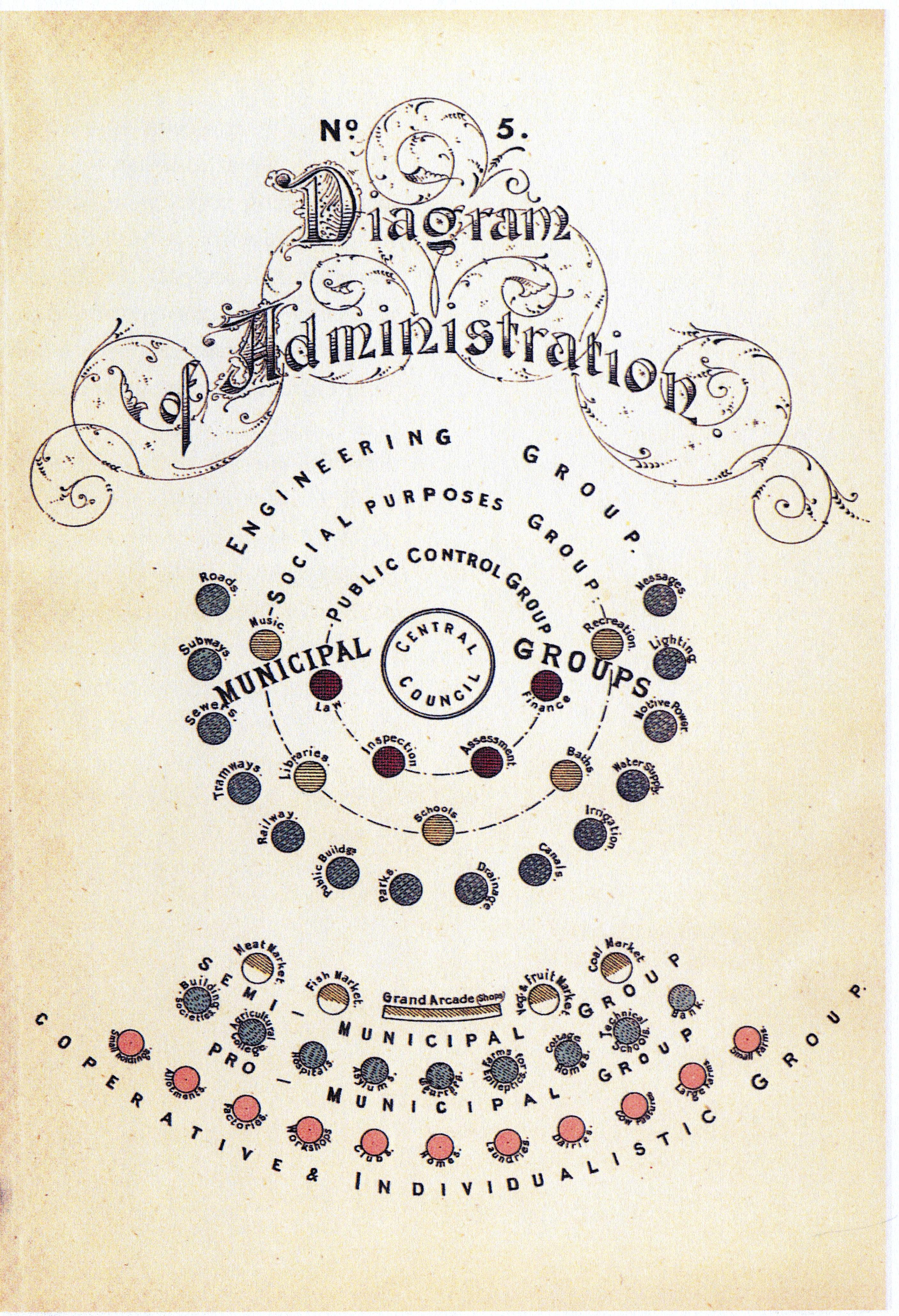
Diagram No.5 (Ebenezer Howard, To-morrow: A Peaceful Path to Real Reform.)

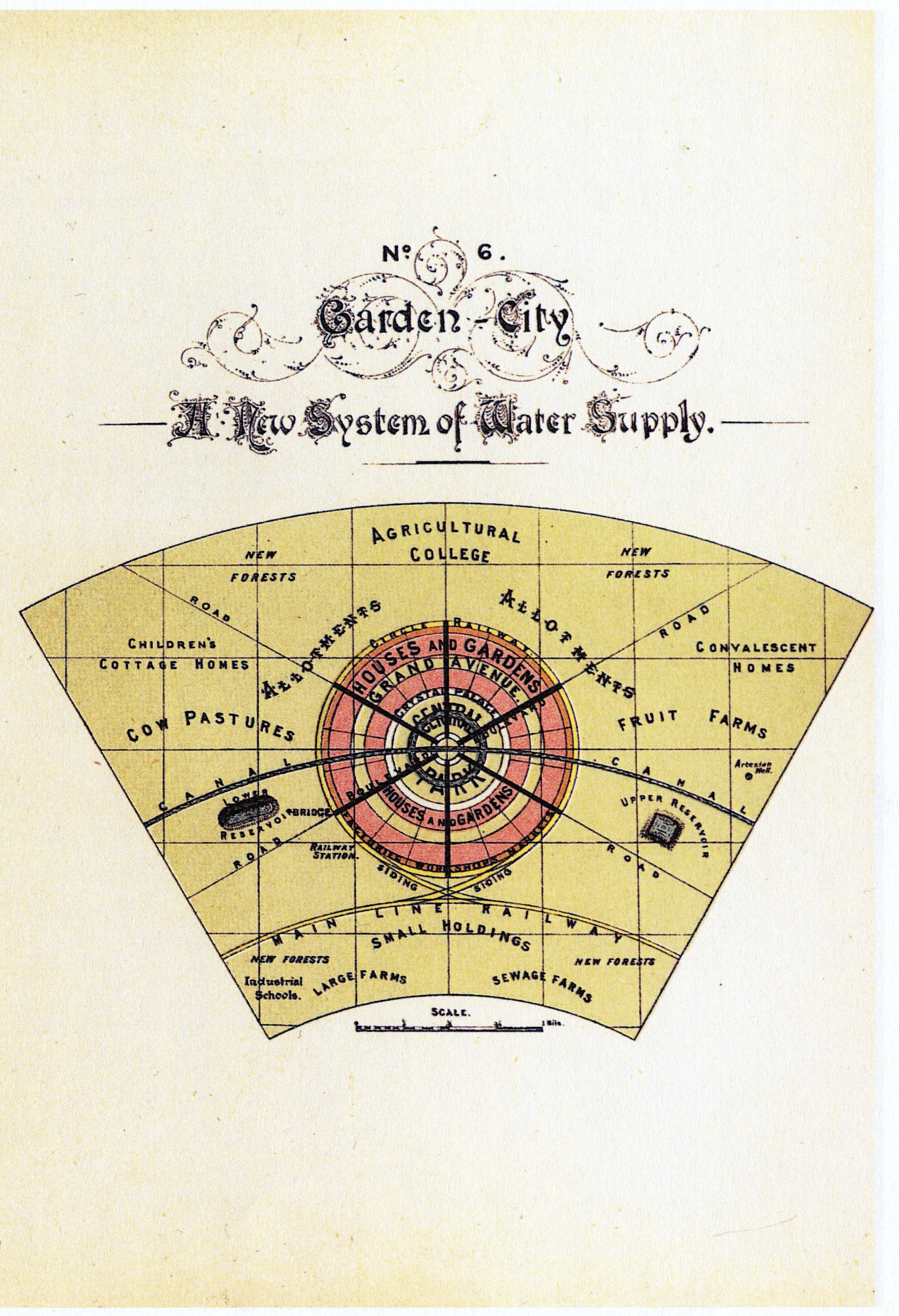
Diagram No.6 (Ebenezer Howard, To-morrow: A Peaceful Path to Real Reform.)

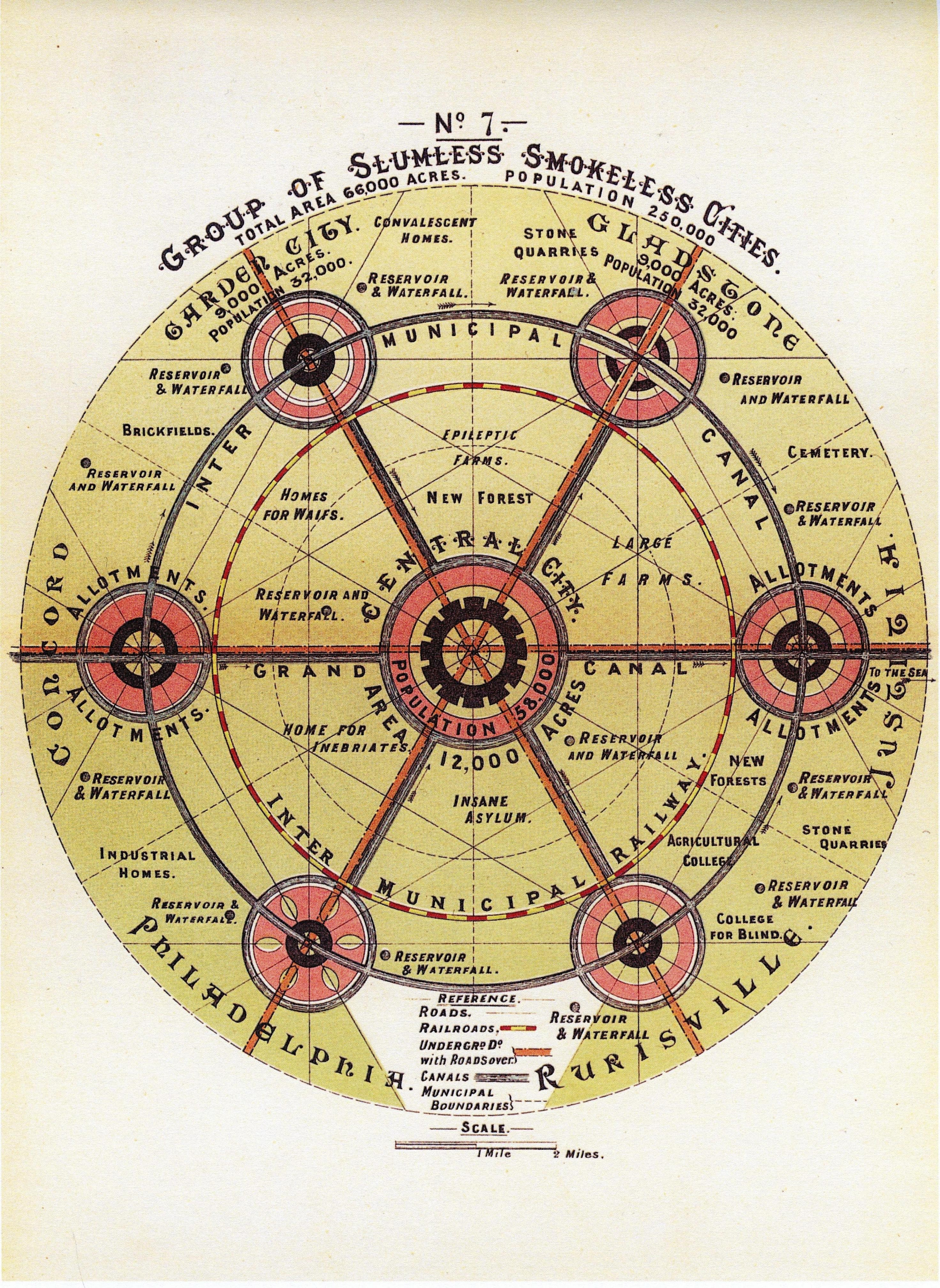
Diagram No.7 (Ebenezer Howard, To-morrow: A Peaceful Path to Real Reform.)

== Diagrams from the 1902 edition ==
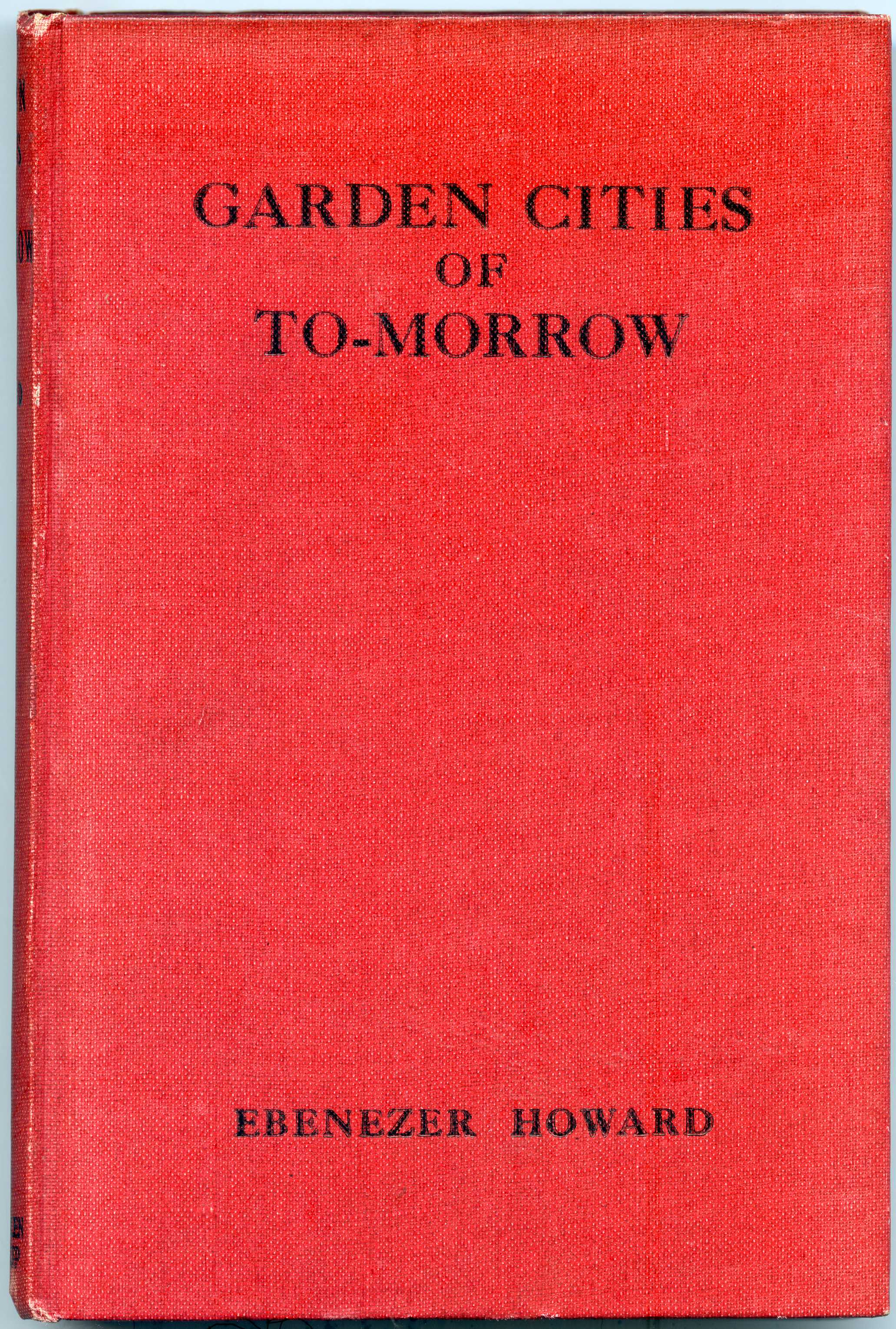
Ebenezer Howard, Garden Cities of To-morrow.

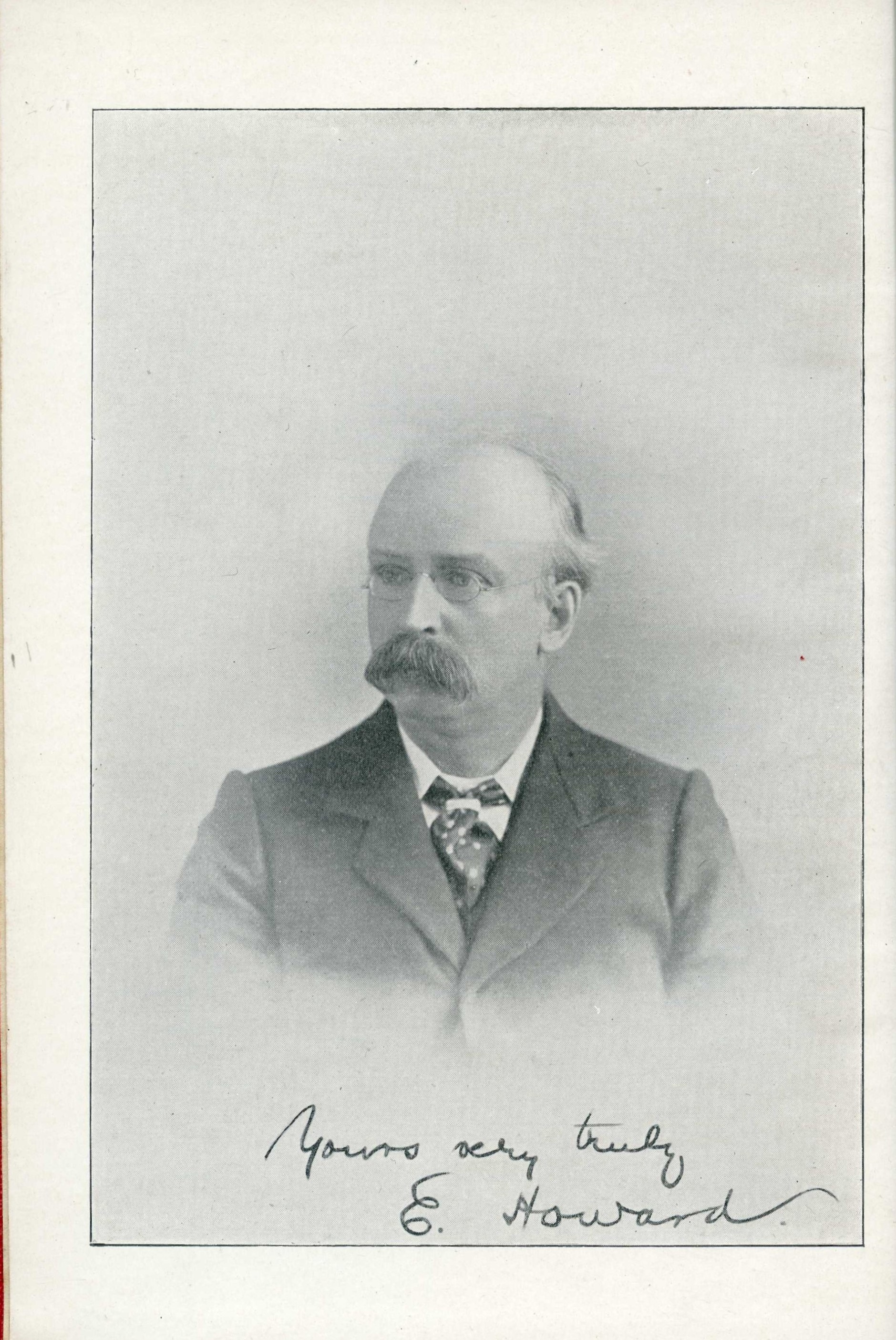
Ebenezer Howard, Garden Cities of To-morrow.

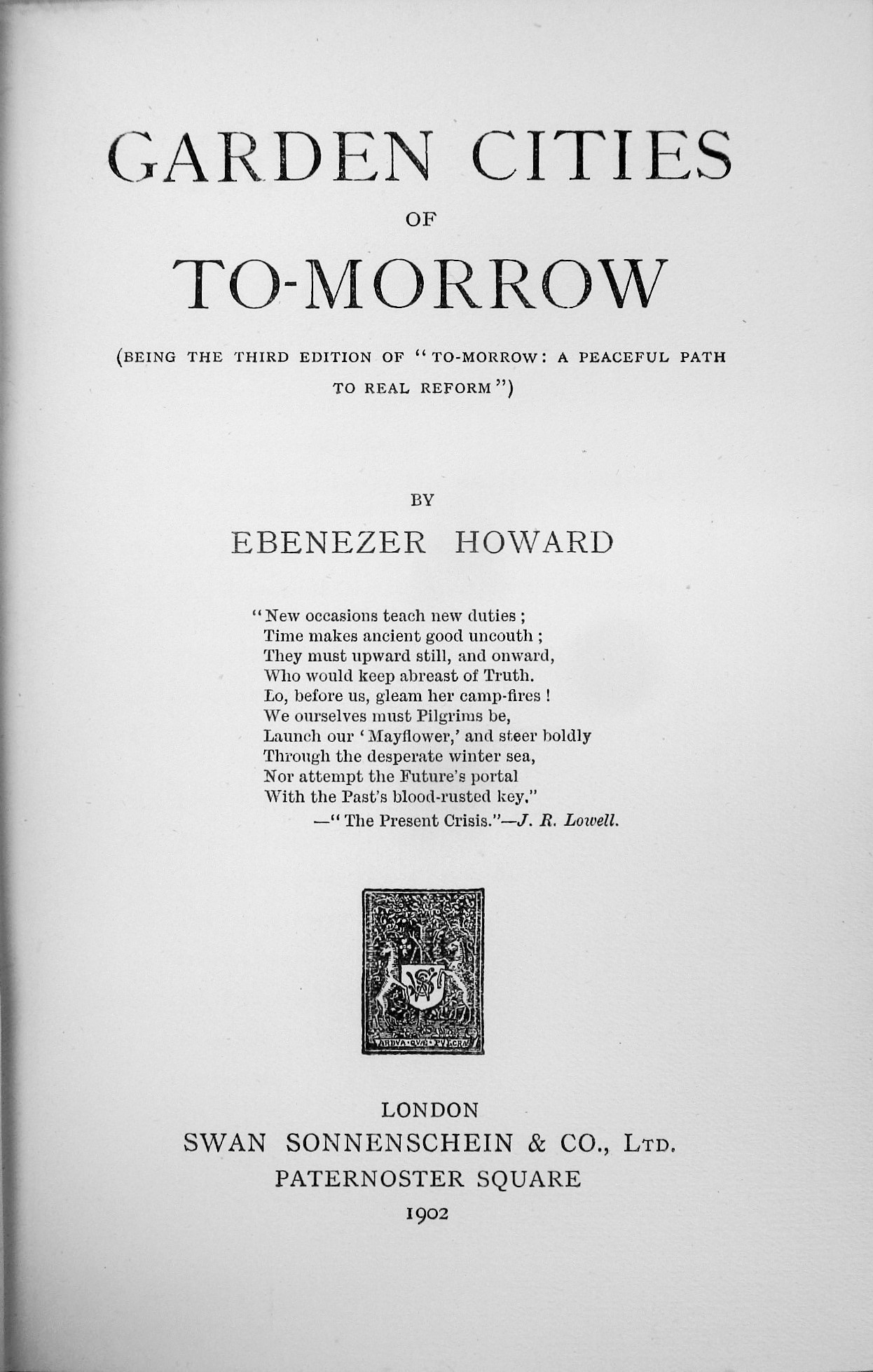
Ebenezer Howard, Garden Cities of To-morrow.

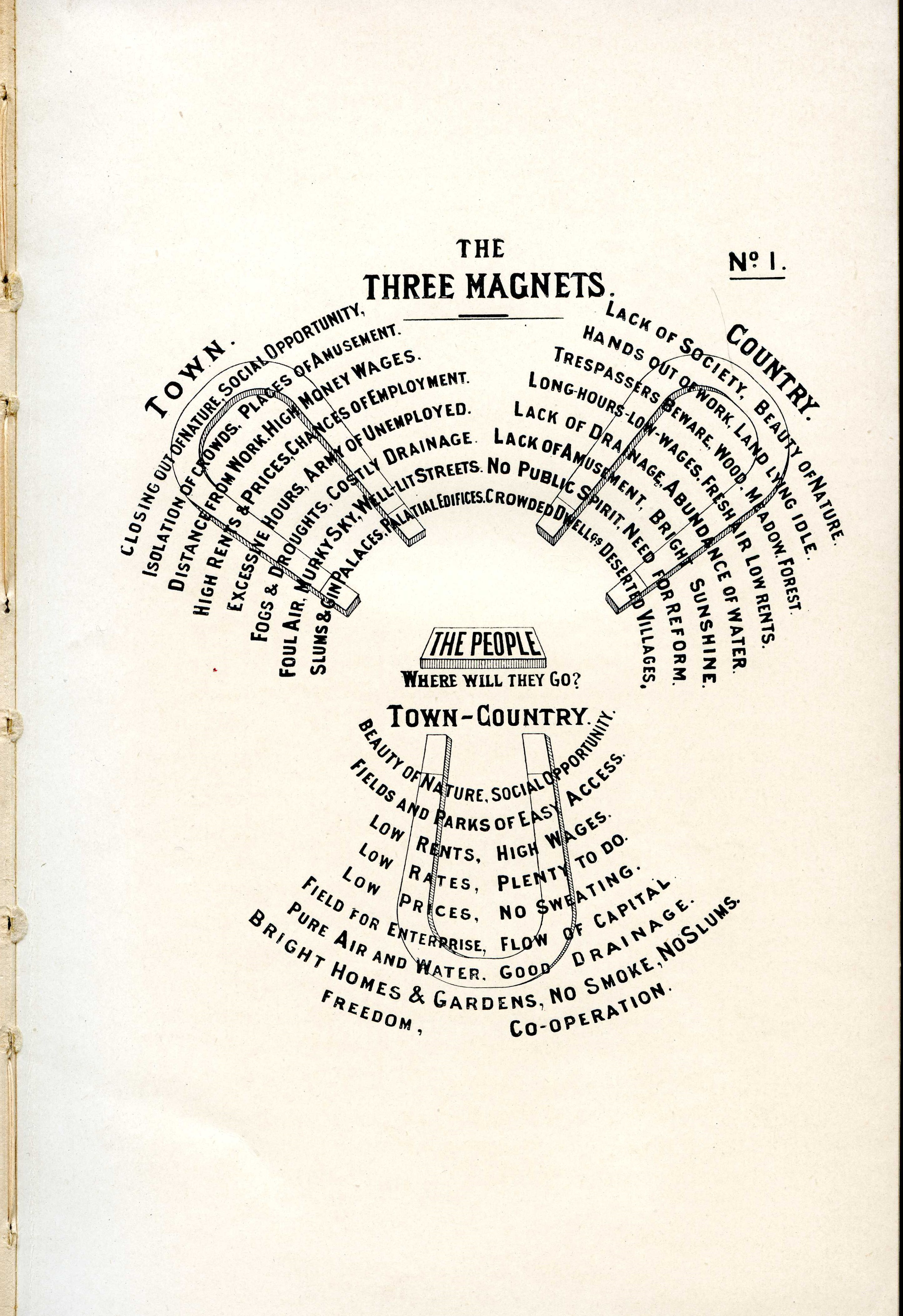
Diagram No.1 (Ebenezer Howard, Garden Cities of To-morrow.)

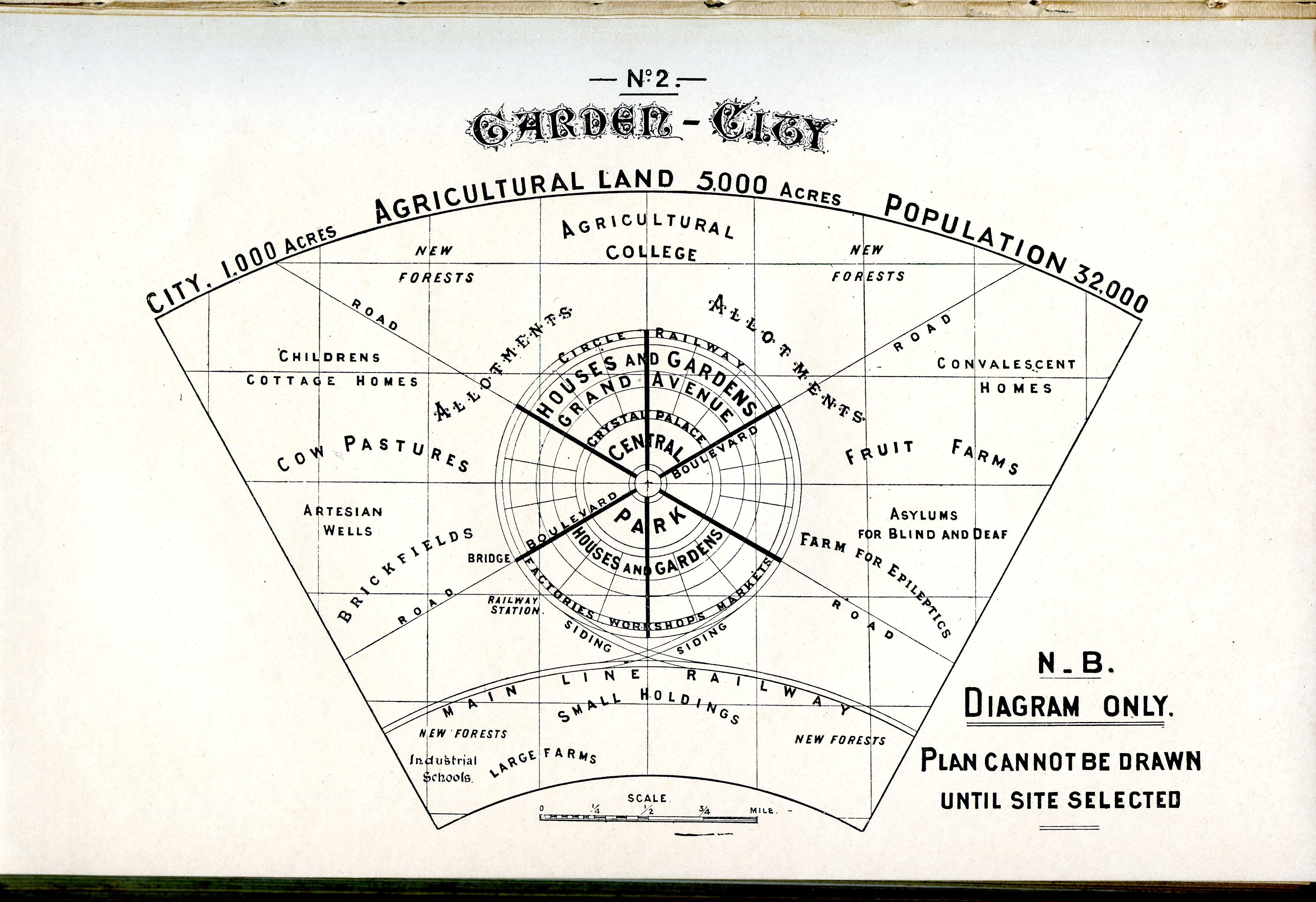
Diagram No.2 (Ebenezer Howard, Garden Cities of To-morrow.)

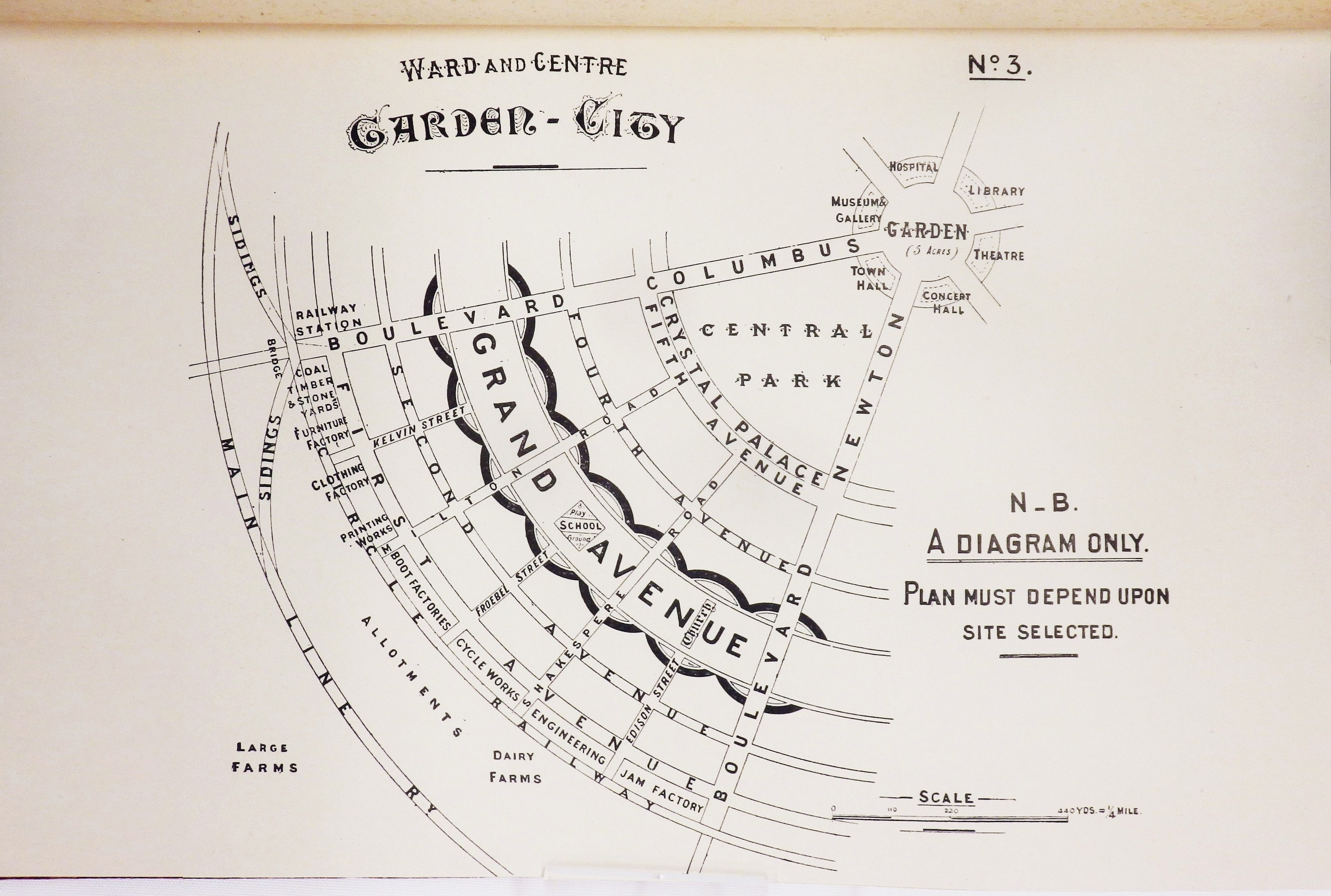
Diagram No.3 (Ebenezer Howard, Garden Cities of To-morrow.)

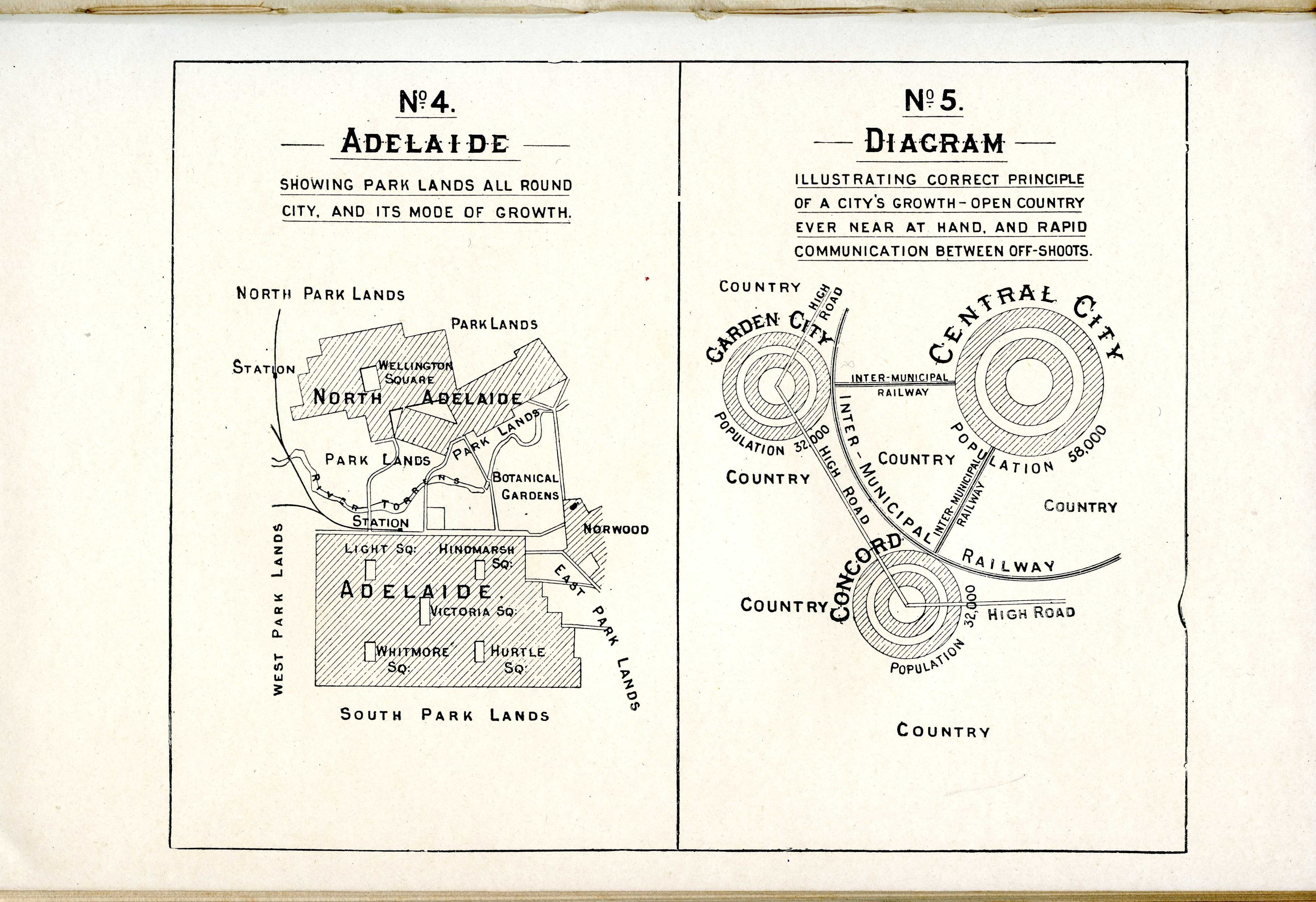
Diagram No.4 y 5 (Ebenezer Howard, Garden Cities of To-morrow.)

== See also ==
- Clarence Stein
- Garden city movement
- Letchworth Garden City
- Welwyn Garden City
- Sutton Garden Suburb
- International Federation for Housing and Planning
