= New liberalism (ideology) =

Political ideology

New liberalism is a variant of social liberalism that emerged in Europe at the end of the 19th century. It began in England driven mainly by the politician and sociologist Leonard Trelawny Hobhouse and theorized in his book Liberalism (1920). It had reception within the Liberal Party of the United Kingdom, giving a rapprochement between it and the Labour Party on social issues.

New liberalism espouses economic reform to create welfare states and significant state intervention in corporate law and the overall economic health of a country, but also "the importance of personal liberty in the face of encroachment by the state".

== New liberal principles ==
Individual freedom is seen as that which the person owes to society. So, that which the individual does morally matters to society, which means that it is hard to establish a separation between what is appropriate for the individual and what is appropriate for the whole society, although it is established what the obligation with society.

If according to individualism society is a set of interrelated people, and according to organicism it is an organism with its own life above the individuals that compose it and prioritizing the importance of society over the individual, for new liberalism society is an organ that moves thanks to individuals and these thanks to society, creating an interrelationship between society and the individual. It thus positions itself between individualism and organicism.

New liberalism promotes speak about common good and not only the individuals. Harmony is not achieved by the free play of individuals.

Freedom is an abstention of coercion and restriction, where the State (or Government) only intervenes in the event of violations of the natural order of competition between individuals. For the new liberalism, freedom does not exist if it is not guaranteed by the State, an expression of society that has a role to play in the expansion of the individual's personality.

Hobhouse distinguishes between the power that respects individual and spiritual freedoms, and that that coerces them. In a job contract, for example, employer and worker are not equal, so employer coerces worker.

It also establishes what the State can do in relation to its coercive power. Poverty and mass unemployment, as opposed to classical liberalism, are social issues. States must intervene so that workers have a decent standard of living. In this sense, Hobhouse includes social rights, such as education, health or unemployment payments, among the fundamental rights. It points to redistributive policies via taxation charged to social surplus value.

== Notable thinkers ==
- Leonard Trelawny Hobhouse (1864–1929)
- Thomas Hill Green (1836–1882)
- John Atkinson Hobson (1858–1940)

== See also ==
- Social liberalism
- Solidarism

== Bibliography ==
- FREEDEN, Michael. The new liberalism. An Ideology of social reform. Clarendon Press. Oxford, 1978.
- HOBHOUSE, Leonard T. Liberalism. Editorial Labor. Barcelona, 1927.
