= Morris Ginsberg =

British sociologist

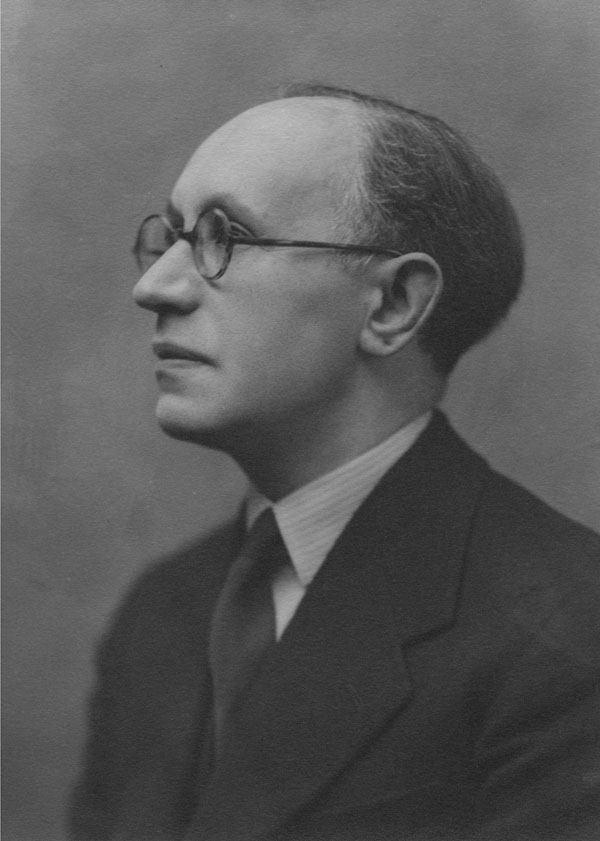
- Morris Ginsberg in the 1930s
- Born: 14 May 1889; Kelmy, Kovno, Russian Empire (now Lithuania)
- Died: 31 August 1970 (aged 81); Highgate, London, England
- Education: University College London
- Scientific career
- Fields: Sociology
- Workplaces: London School of Economics, University College London

Morris Ginsberg FBA (14 May 1889 – 31 August 1970) was a British sociologist, who played a key role in the development of the discipline. He served as editor of The Sociological Review in the 1930s and later became the founding chairman of the British Sociological Association in 1951 and its first President (1955–1957). He was president of the Aristotelian Society from 1942 to 1943, and helped draft the UNESCO 1950 statement titled The Race Question.

== Biography ==
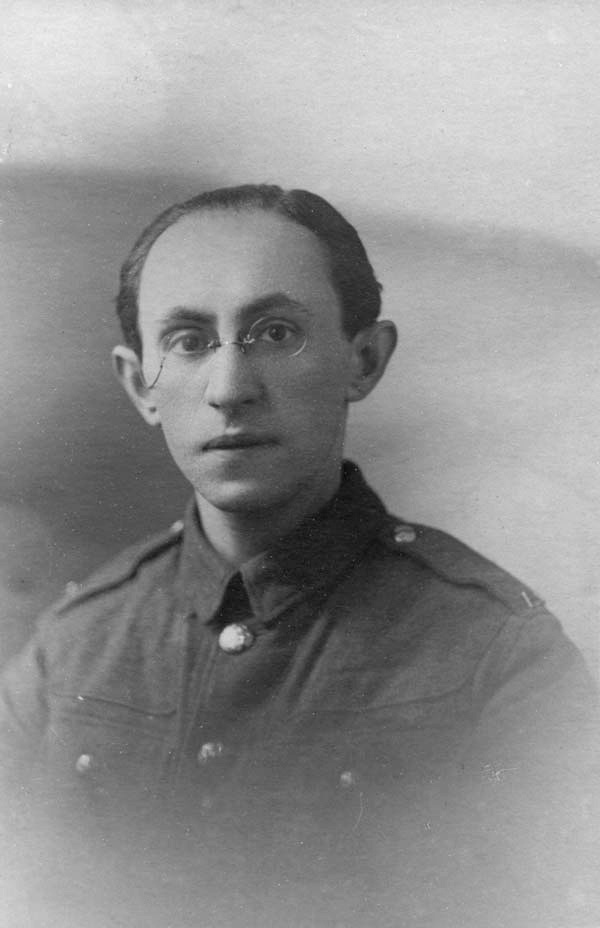
Morris Ginsberg in military uniform, 1918

He was born in Kelmė, a small town in the Kovno Governorate in Lithuania (at the time part of the Russian Empire). He was given an education considered good according to the standards adopted by a small, isolated and intensely religious Jewish community. His knowledge of Hebrew and religious principles was adequate but of secular learning he was absolutely ignorant.

At the age of thirteen he was sent away from home to Telšiai and then to Vilijampolė, where were situated two of the well known Yeshivot or academies for the study of Talmud. There he remained until the age of 15 and studied rabbinical lore with great zeal.

About this time there was a revival of Hebrew literature and an attempt was made by many Jewish writers to introduce the learning of the Western peoples to the Jews of Russia. It was in this way that he was brought into contact with European ideas and inspired with a great desire for secular knowledge.

His father had previously emigrated to Liverpool, England and established a tobacco factory, and at the age of 15 he rejoined him together with his mother and sisters. He made up his mind to study, but at the time he was ignorant of any European language except Yiddish and, although he knew a great deal about religious matters and Hebrew lore, he knew nothing whatever of even the rudiments of secular education. He worked in his father's business and could only study in his spare time. He succeeded, however, in preparing for the Matriculation Examination of the University of London which he passed in January 1907. Unfortunately the stress of circumstances made it impossible for him to continue. For some years he was employed as a clerk in a clothing factory, and later in an engineering shop.

Eventually he obtained a post as a teacher in a small college at Margate, where he remained until about 1910. While there, he prepared for the Inter BA examination which he passed in July of that year. As a result, he was awarded the Martin White Scholarship in Sociology which enabled him to study at University College London for two years. During these two years he took all the first-class prizes offered for Modern and Ancient Philosophy. In 1912 he passed the BA Honours examination with a First Class in Philosophy and Sociology. The professors under whom he had worked were Dawes Hicks of University College London, and Leonard Trelawny Hobhouse of the London School of Economics. Hobhouse invited him to do research work in sociology and in 1913 he became Hobhouse's assistant, the result of their joint investigations being published in 1915 (see below).

At the London School of Economics his work was largely on sociology and political science. At the same time he continued his work in philosophy. He won the John Stuart Mill studentship three times in succession. Ginsberg incidentally acquired a good working knowledge of French and German, and outside his main sphere of studies, he took courses in biology, chemistry and physics. In 1914 he passed the MA examination with special distinction. His thesis consisted of a dissertation on the philosophy of Malebranche and was accompanied by a translation of his Discourses on Metaphysics (1923).

In the meantime he had been appointed Lecturer in Philosophy at University College London, where he gave courses on the history of modern philosophy, logic, and social philosophy. At the London School of Economics he lectured on sociology, ethics and the history of political ideas. During World War I the London School of Economics requested that his military service be postponed as he was standing in to give the courses which had previously been given by R.H. Tawney, Clement Attlee and Charles Mostyn Lloyd.

In 1921 he was reappointed Assistant at the London School of Economics, and full Lecturer in 1923. A year later he was appointed to the Readership in Sociology, being supported by recommendations from Bronisław Malinowski and C.G. Seligman as well as Dawes Hicks from University College London. He published The Psychology of Society in 1921 and by 1964 it had reached its ninth edition and had been translated into many languages ranging from Spanish to Japanese. In 1930 he succeeded Hobhouse to the Martin White Professorship of Sociology at the London School of Economics.

His Sociology, written in 1934, was described by The Guardian in their obituary as "probably the best introduction to the subject ever written". (Guardian, 1 September 1970).

In 1931, Ginsberg married Ethel Street (died 1962); the couple had no children.

He was president of the Ethical Union (now Humanists UK) from 1954 to 1957.

== Main ideas ==
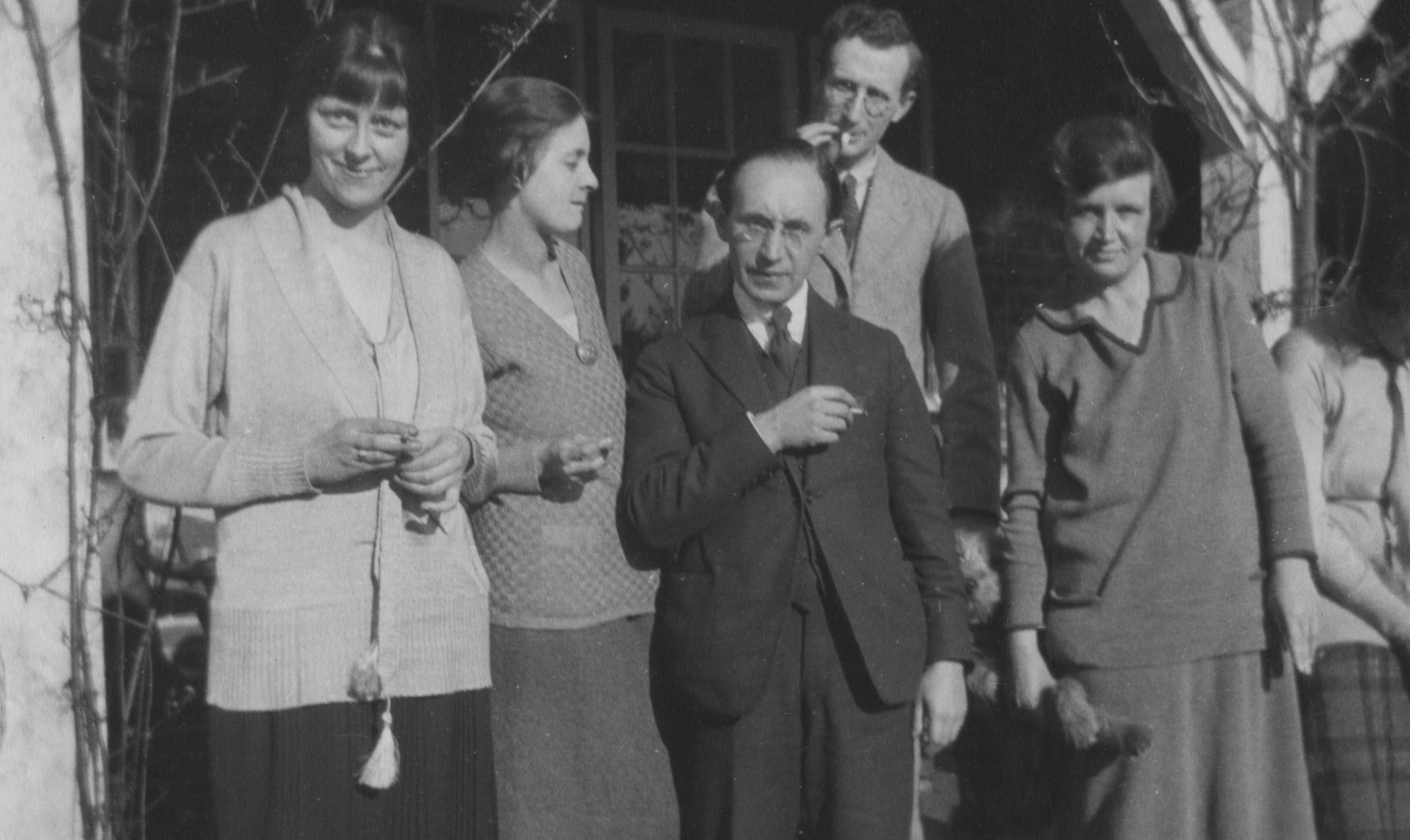
Morris Ginsberg with students c. 1930.

In his thesis on Malebranche, Ginsberg mainly argued against Mario Novaro's criticisms of Malebranche's theory of occasionalism, claiming that Novaro "entirely ignored the main difference between Hume and Malebranche in regard to causality. Malebranche does not, in truth, deny a necessary connection between cause and effect."

Some of the major themes of his work were concerned with

1. The social responsibility of sociologists, which he saw as part of the more general problem of the ethics of knowledge. He believed that there was an urgent need to undertake fuller investigation of the relations between questions of fact and questions of value – particularly in the face of relativistic views that maintain that social conflicts have their origin in fundamental differences of moral outlook.

2. The second main theme is the question of what he called "Reason and Unreason" in human nature and society. He criticised the traditional view, widely propagated from Aristotle through Hume to Bertrand Russell, that the main functions of reason in human affairs lie in the clarification, systematisation and control of impulse and feeling, and the discovery of means to their fulfilment. He contended that reason and feeling should not be held to be in opposition, or reason as the slave of the passions, but that reason could play a significant role in motivating action and directing feeling and conation. He sums up his view as follows:

"We have not to choose between Hume's view of reason as the slave of the passions and Kant's view of it as independent and over-riding them. We may conceive of it rather as that in our personality which strives for integration, deeper than conscious thought, but the more effective the more it uses thought, working within and through the basic impulses and interests and deriving its energy from them".
~ from: "Is Reason the Slave of the Passions" – in The Plain View, Feb. 1955

Morris Ginsberg was continually preoccupied with examining the role of reason in ethics. His position on this has sometimes been misunderstood – occasionally strategically misunderstood. He charted and analysed the diversity of morals among societies, and between groups and individuals, but made a clear distinction between that recognition and assumption that ethics must be entirely relative. In consequence he was ready to take issue with those who propounded emotive theories of ethics, and those who were influenced, for example, by the work of cultural anthropologists to adopt the relativistic standpoint. Cultural relativism, however, does not entail moral relativism, as its opponents often claim in a straw-man argument.

Ginsberg manifested an 'objectivist' theory of ethics in the tradition of Plato, Aristotle, Mill, Sidgwick and Hobhouse. This led him to maintain that 'value' and 'obligation', 'good' and 'bad' are terms not further reducible or analysable into each other or into terms not implying them. He also deals positively with the notion of levels of moral development, and suggests criteria for assessing these. Using these criteria it is possible to detect unmistakable differences of level between different societies in the modern world. He saw clearly that there is no finality in these matters, and that conditions, circumstances and societies change, involving advances and regressions.

3. He was inevitably also concerned with the nature of Justice and its relationship to equality, and the associated question of Law as an increasingly important agent of social change and reform. The ethics of punishment and the complex nature of individual moral freedom and its involvement with legal compulsion is examined in "On Justice in Society" (1965), where he concludes as follows:- 'Three questions have to be asked (a) Is the use of force necessary or can the end aimed at be secured by suasion or voluntary agreement? (b) Can the end in question be attained by compulsion or does its value depend on its being freely or spontaneously pursued? These questions have to be faced in any effort to distinguish between the rights and duties which require and permit of legal reinforcement and rights and duties which are best assured by moral means; that is, by inner conviction and free acceptance.'

4. Another pervading theme in his work was the advocacy of the liberal disposition of mind as a desideratum. He opposed this to fanaticism, impulsiveness, 'totalitarianism'. He was for sanity, coolness, reflection and restraint in judgement. His approach to problems was fundamentally Apollonian, and he mistrusted the Dionysian temperament, though understanding its nature and its potency. As he said ("The Idea of Progress" 1953 pp 72–73) 'The liberal mind is characterised by an abhorrence of fanaticism, a greater readiness to count the cost in terms of human happiness and human lives, a profounder awareness of the effects of violence, both on those who employ it and those who suffer it.'

== Works ==
- The material culture and social institutions of the simpler peoples (with L. T. Hobhouse, Wheeler), (1915)
- The Psychology of Society, (1920)
- L. T. Hobhouse (with J. A. Hobson), (1931)
- Studies in Sociology, (1932)
- Sociology, (1934)
- Reason and unreason in society, (1947)
- 1923 Translation of Malebranche's Dialogues on Metaphysics and on Religion, The Macmillan Company
- Essays in Sociology and Social Philosophy (in three volumes): 1. On the Diversity of Morals, 2. , Reason and Unreason in Society, 3. Evolution and Progress, (1956)

== See also ==
- Moral objectivism
- Malebranche's occasionalism

== Footnotes ==
Academic offices
Preceded by First President	President of the British Sociological Association; 1955–1957	Succeeded by Barbara Wootton, Baroness Wootton of Abinger
