= Henry Vivian (trade unionist) =

Henry Harvey Vivian
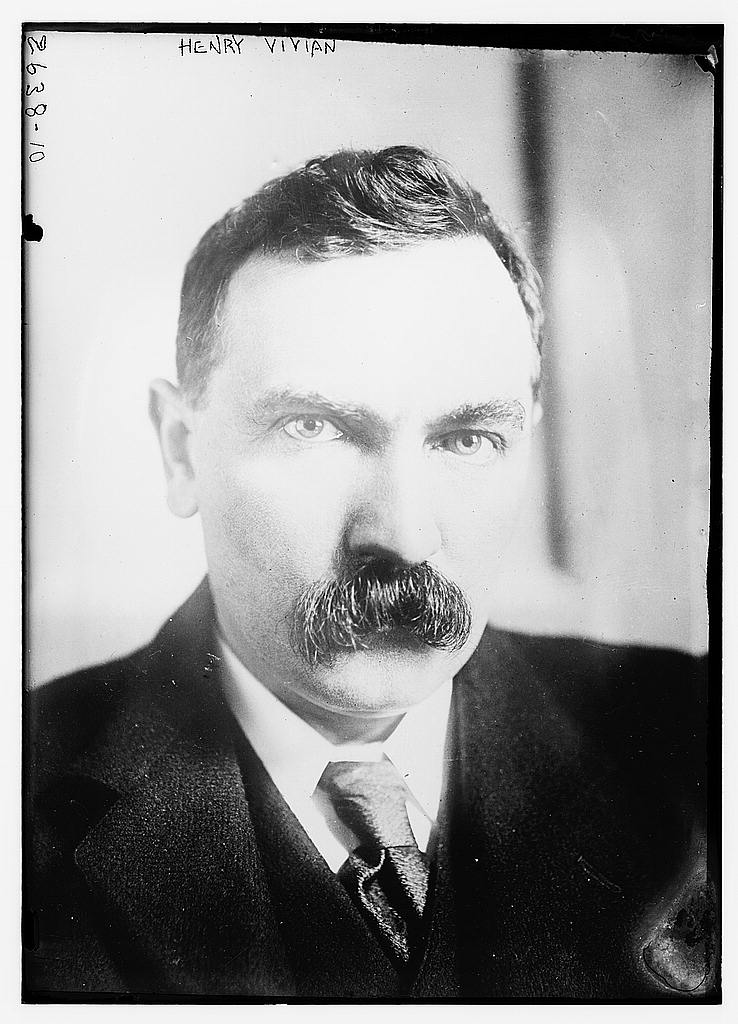
- Vivian in May 1913

Member of Parliament for Totnes
- In office 6 December 1923 – 9 October 1924
- Preceded by: Samuel Harvey
- Succeeded by: Samuel Harvey

Member of Parliament for Birkenhead
- In office 1906–1910
- Preceded by: Elliott Lees
- Succeeded by: Alfred Bigland

Personal details
- Born: 20 April 1868 Cornwood, England
- Died: 30 May 1930 (aged 62)
- Party: Liberal Party

Henry Harvey Vivian (20 April 1868 – 30 May 1930) was an English trade unionist, and Liberal Party politician and campaigner for industrial democracy and co-partnership, especially noted for his work in co-partnership housing.

== Biography ==
Vivian was born in Cornwood, Devon, not far from Dartmoor, the son of William Henry Vivian, a carpenter. He was educated at the local Church of England or 'national' school and following a period as an apprentice to a local carpenter, he moved to London for work. In August 1894, he married Harriett Helen Sturgeon, the daughter of an Inland Revenue supervisor. Together with their daughter they lived in Burgoyne Road, Harringay.

Vivian's spiritual beliefs appear to have been very much in line with his political ones. John Burns, on opening a new recreation ground at Brentham in June 1908, described him as a practical mystic

== Career ==
=== Trade unionist ===
Like his father, Vivian was a carpenter by trade and became an active trade union organiser. He was for a time President of the Pimlico Society of Carpenters and Joiners.

=== Co-partnership ===
He was a strong believer in the ideals of the cooperative movement being a member of the Central Board of the Cooperative Congress for the London region and of co-partnership in industry and society which he believed made industrial harmony more likely as employees gained a direct stake in the ownership and success (through profit-sharing) of the companies for which they worked. He was a leader in the co-partnership housing movement, a campaigning secretary of the Labour Co-partnership Association, chairman of the Co-partnership Tenants' Housing Council and of Co-partnership Tenants Ltd. He also co-founded and edited the journal Labour Co-partnership.

=== Urban planner ===
Vivian set up a company called General Builders Ltd., a practical venture into co-partnership with the aim of providing its members with work and accommodation. One of Vivian's most enduring achievements was the building of the Brentham Garden Suburb in the Pitshanger area of Ealing following the philosophy of the garden city movement promoted by Ebenezer Howard. Brentham featured a social institute, library, tennis courts and a bowling green. In addition the houses were designed with large gardens and the house attracted interest from British and foreign urban planners. He was chairman on the project's management body, Ealing Tenants Ltd from its inception in 1901. Although he resigned the chairmanship in 1911, he remained on the committee until his death. At the invitation of the Governor-General, Vivian made a tour of Canada in 1910 to promote similar schemes and lecture on town planning, housing conditions, sanitation and public health. Co-Partnership Tenants Ltd went on to play an important role in the development of the garden city of Letchworth and of Hampstead Garden Suburb.

== Politics ==
Henry Vivian

Vivian was a Free Trade Liberal not a socialist. While he did not believe in votes for women, as his support for co-partnership demonstrated, he believed in the Liberal virtues of self-reliance, self-help and freedom from state interference. He was first elected to Parliament at the 1906 general election as Lib-Lab candidate for Birkenhead, in Cheshire. He opposed the movement of Trade Union MPs into the Labour Party in 1908. He voted against what he saw as socialist measures such as the Unemployed Workmen Bill which placed a duty on local committees to provide work or relief for the unemployed. Vivian held his Birkenhead seat at the general election of January 1910, albeit by the narrow margin of 144 votes. In December 1910 however, when he was subject to attacks from the left accusing him of being 'the workers' enemy' and urging socialists to vote against him, he lost to the Unionists.

=== South Somerset by-election, 1911 ===
Vivian got a chance to re-enter the House of Commons in 1911 when the Liberal MP for South Somerset, Sir Edward Strachey, was given a peerage, causing a by-election. Vivian was adopted as Liberal candidate. South Somerset had been a Liberal seat since its creation in 1885 and Strachey had been MP for the constituency since 1892 but the size of his majorities had been decreasing since 1906 and the Conservative candidate in the by-election, Aubrey Herbert, had the advantage of being known in the area, having been the candidate in both the general elections of 1910. The election seems to have fought mostly on the issue of the National Insurance Act. On 13 November, in a portent of things to come, the Unionists won a Liberal seat in a by-election at Oldham. Herbert entered polling day in a mood of great optimism and duly emerged as the new MP with a majority of 148 votes over Vivian.

=== 1918–1922 ===
Vivian had no wish to end his political career and was adopted as Liberal candidate for the new north London constituency of Edmonton in 1917. At the 1918 general election he faced a four-cornered contest there standing as an Independent Asquithian Liberal but was not successful.

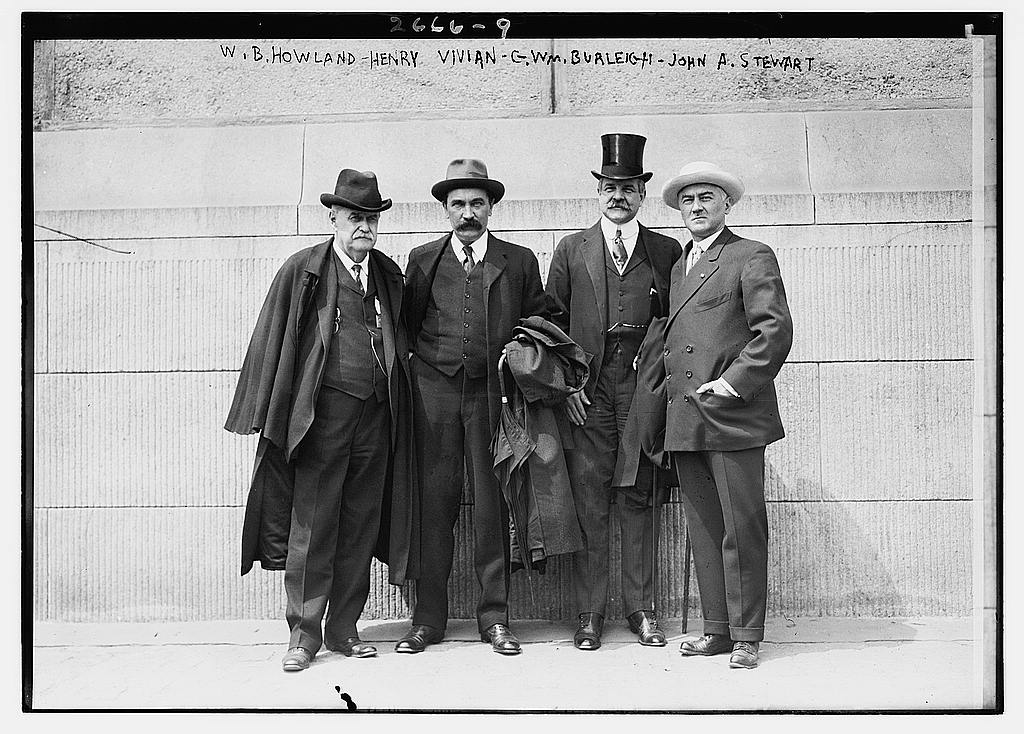
William Bailey Howland; and Henry Harvey Vivian at the International Conference for the British American Peace Centenary, 1914–1915, held in New York, 5–10 May 1913

He next fought Northampton at the 1922 general election again as an Independent Liberal in a three-cornered contest with a Lloyd George National Liberal and Labour. The National Liberal topped the poll and Vivian lost his deposit.

=== 1923–1924 ===
By the time of the 1923 general election, the two wings of the Liberal Party had re-united and Vivian was chosen as candidate for Totnes in his home county of Devon. He beat the sitting Tory MP Samuel Harvey by a majority of 502 votes. However this margin was too narrow to hold against a resurgent Conservative Party at the 1924 election and Harvey regained the seat. Vivian did not stand for Parliament again but remained interested in Liberal politics as an active member of Hornsey Liberal Association.

== Political and public appointments ==
In 1906, Vivian was appointed a member of the Royal Commission on Canals and Waterways. He was a member of the House of Commons Select Committee on Housing and Town Planning and of a Home Office Departmental Committee on Accidents in Factories and Workshops. After the First World War, Vivian became an enthusiastic supporter of the League of Nations and he was chairman of his local branch of the League of Nations Union in Hornsey.

== Death ==
Vivian died on 30 May 1930 aged 62 years at his home, The Limes, Crouch End Hill in Hornsey.

== Publications ==
- How Co-operative Production May be Successfully Applied to the Building Trades – Labour Association for Promoting Co-operative Production Based on the Co-partnership of the Workers (undated)
- Some Aspects of the Co-operative Movement – Labour Association for Promoting Co-operative Production Based on the Co-partnership of the Workers (undated)
- The Efficient Organisation of Industry – – Labour Association for Promoting Co-operative Production Based on the Co-partnership of the Workers (undated)
- What Co-operative Production is Doing – Labour Association for Promoting Co-operative Production Based on the Co-partnership of the Workers, 1897
- Partnership of Capital and Labour as a solution of the Conflict between them – Labour Association for Promoting Co-operative Production Based on the Co-partnership of the Workers, 1898
- Co-operative Stores and Labour Co-partnership – Labour Association for Promoting Co-operative Production Based on the Co-partnership of the Workers (Great Britain), 1899
- Co-operative Production – Labour Co-partnership Association, 1899
- Co-operation and Trade Unionism – Labour Co-partnership Association, 1902
- Industrial Democracy – Labour Co-partnership Association, 1902
- Co-operators and preferential tariffs – Liberal Publications Dept., London 1903
- Co-partnership – The Labour Co-partnership Association, 1906
- A New Chapter in the History of Co-operation and Labour: The North Wales Quarries Ltd. – Co-operative Union, Ltd., 1906
- The Pioneer Co-partnership Village – Ealing Tenants Ltd., 1908
- Co-Partnership in Housing – Co-Partnership Tenants, London 1910
- Problems of Finance: with special reference to the co-partnership movement – Co-partnership publishers, London 1912
- Some Experiments in Community Making – Co-partnership publishers, London 1912
- Co-partnership in practice – Labour Co-partnership Association, 1912
- How to Apply Town Planning to Calgary – 1912

Parliament of the United Kingdom
Preceded by Elliott Lees	Member of Parliament for Birkenhead; 1906 – Dec. 1910	Succeeded by Alfred Bigland
Preceded by Samuel Harvey	Member of Parliament for Totnes; 1923–1924	Succeeded by Samuel Harvey
