= Frederick Victor Branford =

Scottish poet

Frederick Victor Branford (1892–1941) was a Scottish poet, known for verse of World War I and the years after.

== Biography ==
Born Frederick Victor Rubens Branford Powell, the son of actors Mary Branford and Joynson Powell, he was given the second name of Mary's brother Victor Branford and was known in the family as 'Freddie' Powell. After the death of his mother he was brought up by his aunt Dorothy and after her separation from Lionel Branford, they lived in Ardgay, Scotland. (Alasdair Alpin MacGregor's The Goat Wife tells the evocative story of his hard working and resourceful Aunt Dorothy, who left a comfortable existence in Edinburgh for life as a solo crofter in the Easter Ross village of Ardgay (then known locally as "High Wind"). Branford appears in the book as "Victor".) He may have felt closer to the Branfords than to his father and published his poetry under the surname of Branford.

He was educated at Edinburgh University and Leiden University. Serving as a captain in the Royal Naval Air Service during World War I, Branford was very badly wounded at the Battle of the Somme, when he was shot down over the Belgian coast and swam ashore to the Netherlands, where he was interned. Most of his poems were written in a long period of recovery from his injuries, which left him totally disabled. He lived on a disability pension for the rest of his life.

Branford stopped writing poetry in 1923, disillusioned with the prospects for future peace. He remarried in 1937, his second wife was his cousin Margaret Branford, the playwright daughter of John Branford.

== Works ==
- Titans and Gods (1922)
- Five Poems (1922)
- The White Stallion (1924)
