= Co-partnership housing movement =

Housing co-partnership was a social movement that developed alongside the garden city movement in Britain between 1900 and 1914 and which financed and built most of the suburbs and villages associated with that movement. It was also a unique form of tenure combining features of a tenant co-operative and a limited dividend company.

The idea of co-operative housing can be traced back to early 19th Century figures, notably Robert Owen and Charles Fourier. Providing housing was one of the key objectives of the Rochdale Pioneers, an early British co-op whose principles were associated with the rapid growth of the co-operative movement in the second half of the 19th century. However, it was not until 1901 that the first successful wave of co-partnerships was set up at Brentham in Ealing in west London. Its leading figure was Henry Harvey Vivian.

The connections between the garden city and co-operative movements go back to the 1870s and 1880s when Ebenezer Howard was moving in radical circles which included utopian community builders and land reformers. But the practical link came in 1901 when London lawyer and chairman of the Labour Association, Ralph Neville, was persuaded by Howard to become chair of the Garden City Association (GCA). Neville introduced Howard to a group of wealthy and influential people who had already invested in the Ealing project. By 1903, this group was ready to invest in the Letchworth project. Two years later the link was sealed when Vivian brought in GCA architects Unwin and Parker to work on the Ealing project.
