= James Shaw Grant =

James Shaw Grant FRSE CBE (22 May 1910 – 28 July 1999) was a writer and journalist from the Isle of Lewis. He was strongly associated with the Highlands and Islands Development Board.

== Life ==
He was born in Stornoway and educated at the Nicholson Institute in Stornoway. He then attended the University of Glasgow gaining an MA 1931.

He became editor of the Stornoway Gazette in 1932 following on from his father and held this post until 1963.

In 1956 he broadcast A Gaelic capital on BBC Scotland, an audio tour of Stornoway. He wrote a number of books about crofting communities, such as the comic novel The Enchanted Island.

From 1972 to 1984 he was Chairman of the Harris Tweed Association. He was also Chairman of the Crofters Commission 1963 to 1978.

In 1979 the University of Aberdeen awarded him an honorary doctorate (LLD).

In 1982 he was elected a Fellow of the Royal Society of Edinburgh. His proposers were Fraser Noble, Lord Cameron, Anthony Elliot Ritchie, Neill Campbell, Thomas L Johnston and Sir Kenneth Alexander.

He died in Aberdeen on 28 July 1999.

== Family ==
In 1951 he married Catherine Mary Stewart (d.1989).

== Books ==
- Highland Villages, 1977, Hale, ISBN 0-7091-5886-6
- The Hub of my Universe, 1982, James Thin, ISBN 0-9508371-0-5
- The Gaelic Vikings, 1984, James Thin, ISBN 0-9508371-2-1
- Discovering Lewis & Harris, 1987, John Donald, ISBN 0-85976-185-1
- The Enchanted Island, 1989, J. S. Grant, ISBN 0-9508371-4-8
- A Shilling for Your Scowl: The History of a Scottish Legal Mafia, 1991, Acair, ISBN 0-86152-898-0
- Morrison of the Bounty: A Scotsman - Famous But Unknown, 1997, Acair, ISBN 0-86152-197-8
