= Moral objectivism =

Moral objectivism may refer to:

- Moral realism, the meta-ethical position that ethical sentences express factual propositions that refer to objective features of the world
- Moral universalism, the meta-ethical position that some system of ethics or morality is universally valid
- The ethical branch of Ayn Rand's philosophy of Objectivism

== See also ==
- Moral absolutism
