= The Sociological Review =

- Discipline: Sociology
- Language: English

Publication details
- History: 1908–present
- Publisher: SAGE Publishing in association with The Sociological Review Publication
- Frequency: Quarterly
- Open access: Yes
- License: CC BY-NC-SA 4.0
- Impact factor: 2.1 (2023)

Standard abbreviations
- ISO 4: Sociol. Rev.

Indexing
- ISSN: 0038-0261 (print); 1467-954X (web)
- LCCN: 09007601
- OCLC no.: 505014828

Links
- Journal homepage; Online access; Online archive

The Sociological Review is a quarterly peer-reviewed academic journal covering all aspects of sociology, including anthropology, criminology, philosophy, education, gender, medicine, and organization. The journal is published by SAGE Publishing; before 2017 it was published by Wiley-Blackwell. It is one of the three "main sociology journals in Britain", along with the British Journal of Sociology and Sociology, and the oldest British sociology journal.

The journal also publishes a monograph series that presents scholarly articles on issues of general sociological interest, and a themed monthly magazine that "present[s] timely insights grounded in sociological thinking and [...] writing for a broad readership".

== History ==
Established in 1908 as a successor of the Papers of the Sociological Society, its founder and first editor-in-chief was Leonard Trelawny Hobhouse.

The journal also runs The Sociological Review Foundation, which was founded to make use of the journal's royalties and holds lectures, public events, and publishes a magazine.

=== Editors ===
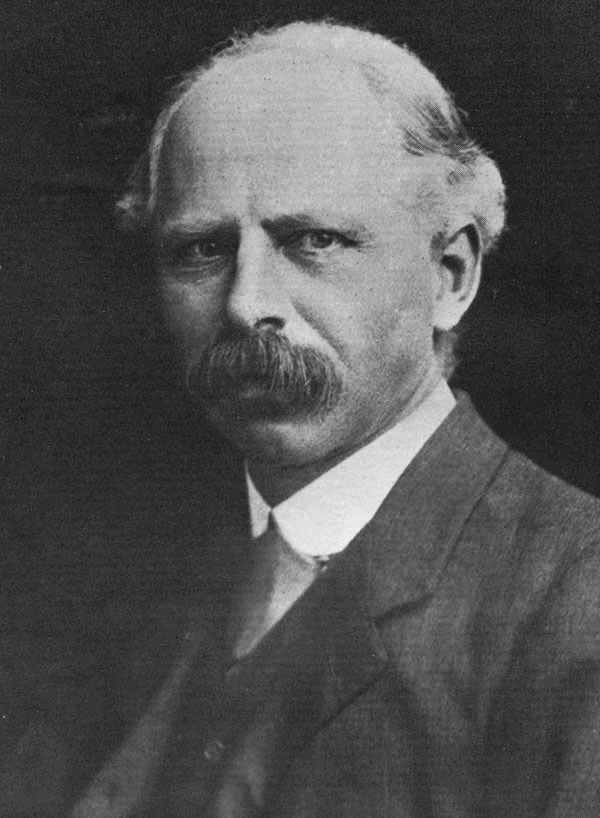
The journal's founder and first editor, Leonard Trelawny Hobhouse

The following persons have been editors-in-chief of this journal:

- Leonard Trelawny Hobhouse 1908–1910
- Samuel Kerkham Ratcliffe 1910–1917
- Victor Branford 1917–?
- Alexander Carr-Saunders, Alexander Farquharson, and Morris Ginsberg 1934–?

== Abstracting and indexing ==
The journal is abstracted and indexed in the Social Sciences Citation Index. According to the Journal Citation Reports, the journal has a 2023 impact factor of 2.1.
