= Muswell Hill, Buckinghamshire =

Geological site in England

Coordinates: 51.833099°N 1.071889°W

Muswell Hill
- Site of Special Scientific Interest
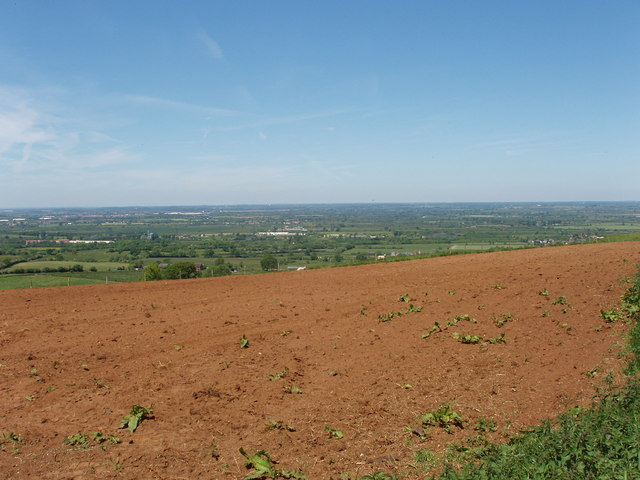
- Location of Muswell Hill.
- Area of search: Buckinghamshire
- Grid reference: SP640153
- Interest: Geological
- Area: 0.2 ha (0.49 acres)
- Notification date: 1992
- Location map: Magic Map

Muswell Hill is a 0.2-hectare (0.49-acre) geological Site of Special Scientific Interest north-west of Brill in Buckinghamshire. The local planning authorities are Buckinghamshire County Council and Aylesbury Vale District Council. It is listed by the Joint Nature Conservation Committee as a Geological Conservation Review site.

This site has sandstones and sandy ironstones. It is problematic as their precise age and the circumstances of deposition are uncertain, but they are thought to be early Cretaceous, with late Jurassic underlying layers. There is considerable potential for further research on dating the transition between the two periods.
