= Stornoway Gazette =

Weekly newspaper serving the Outer Hebrides

- Owner: National World
- Founder: William Grant
- Founded: 5 January 1917; 109 years ago
- Circulation: 2,246 (as of 2024)
- ISSN: 2397-2122
- Website: stornowaygazette.co.uk

The Stornoway Gazette, formerly the Stornoway Gazette and West Coast Advertiser, is a newspaper reporting on local issues in the Outer Hebrides, Scotland.

== History ==
The Stornoway Gazette was established on 5 January 1917 by William Grant (1873–1932), a correspondent for the Highland News from Inverness, following a dispute over the publication of the Roll of Honour of those from the Isle of Lewis who served in World War I. He served as the Gazette's editor-in-chief until his death and was succeeded by his son James Shaw Grant, who resigned as the editor in 1963 to become chairman of the Crofter's Commission while continuing in his role as a director of the publication.

In July 1979, The Stornoway Gazette was acquired by The Galloway Gazette, with a sale having been announced that February.

In 2004, nine months of head-to-head competition with a rival title ended with The Hebridean ceasing publication. Following this, the Gazette acquired the title and the publication rights to The Hebridean.

Johnston Press, the Edinburgh-based newspaper group, became the paper owner in 2004 when they bought Score Press, a division of Scottish Radio Holdings.

In 2013, when the Gazette was 96 years old, it was decided to relaunch as a compact.

It was awarded the 2013 Newspaper of the Year award at the annual Highlands and Islands Media Awards.
