= Brentham Garden Suburb =

Coordinates: 51.527007°N 0.304877°W

- Location within Greater London
- London borough: Ealing
- Ceremonial county: Greater London
- Region: London
- Country: England
- Sovereign state: United Kingdom
- Post town: LONDON
- Postcode district: W5
- Dialling code: 020
- Police: Metropolitan
- Fire: London
- Ambulance: London
- London Assembly: Ealing and Hillingdon

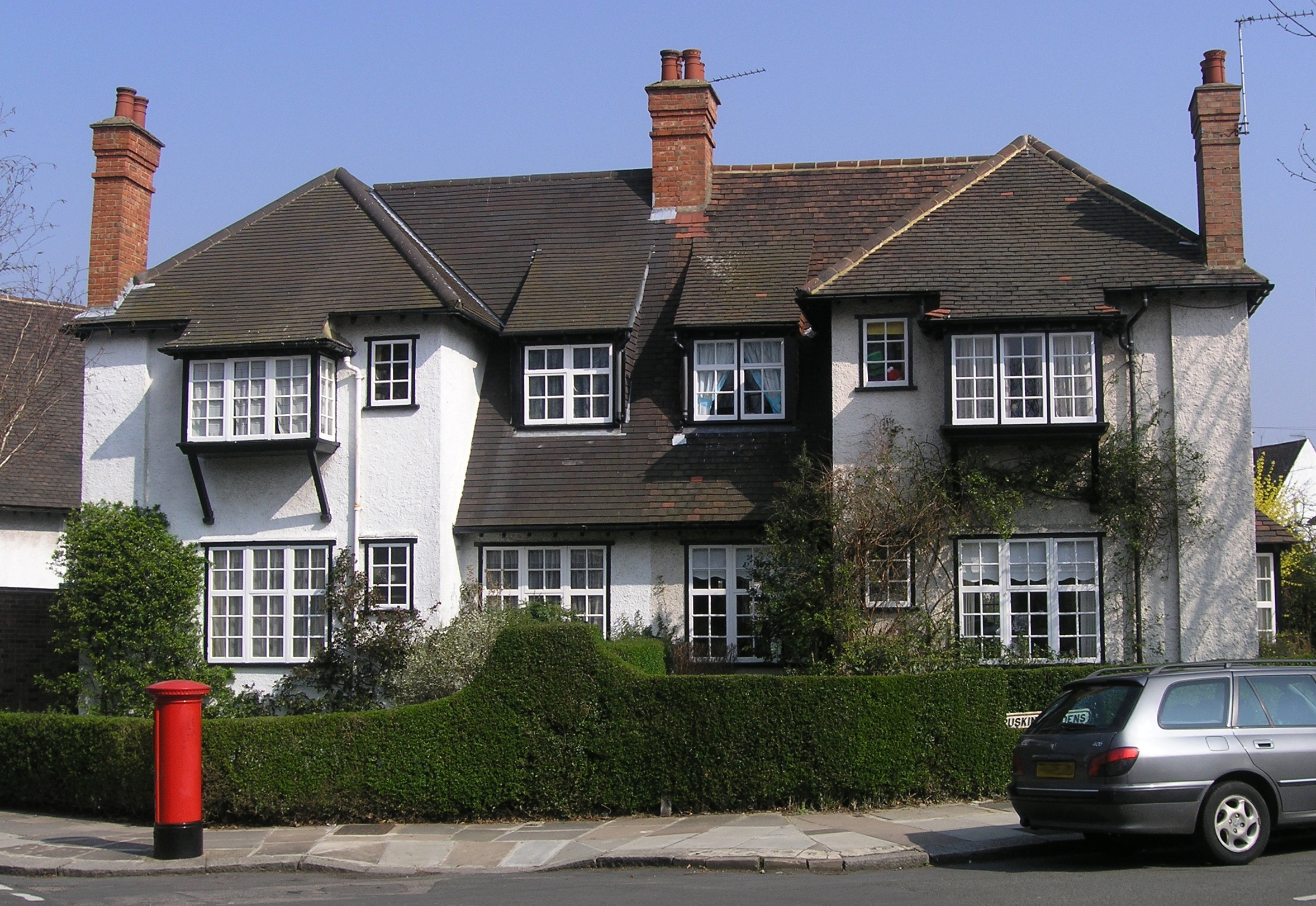
Ludlow Road in Brentham Garden Suburb

Brentham Garden Suburb near Pitshanger in Ealing was the first garden suburb in London to be built in co-partnership housing movement principles, predating the larger and better-known Hampstead Garden Suburb by some years. It was mostly built between 1901 and 1915, and became a conservation area in 1969. St Barnabas Church was added in 1916.
