= Leonard Hobhouse =

British political theorist

Leonard Trelawny Hobhouse FBA
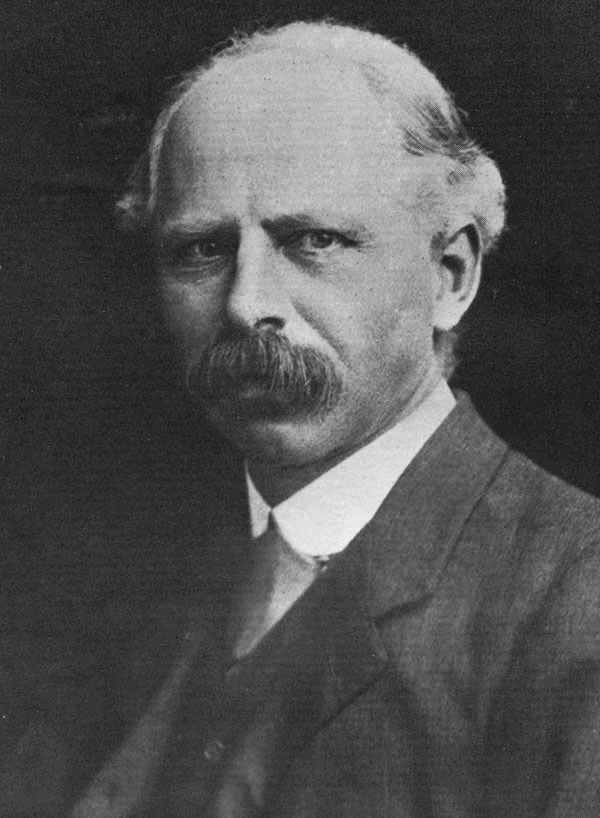
- Born: 8 September 1864; St Ive, Cornwall, England
- Died: 21 June 1929 (aged 64); Alençon, France
- Education: Marlborough College; Corpus Christi College, Oxford
- Occupations: Sociologist, political theorist, journalist
- Employer(s): University of London; Manchester Guardian
- Notable work: Liberalism (1911)
- Movement: Social liberalism, new liberalism
- Parent(s): Reginald Hobhouse (father); Caroline Trelawny (mother)
- Relatives: Emily Hobhouse (sister)

Leonard Trelawny Hobhouse, FBA (8 September 1864 – 21 June 1929) was a British liberal political theorist and sociologist, who has been considered one of the leading and earliest proponents of social liberalism. His works, culminating in his famous book Liberalism (1911), occupy a seminal position within the canon of New Liberalism.

He worked both as an academic and a journalist, and played a key role in the establishment of sociology as an academic discipline; in 1907 he shared, with Edward Westermarck, the distinction of being the first professor of sociology to be appointed in the United Kingdom, at the University of London. He was also the founder and first editor of The Sociological Review. His sister was Emily Hobhouse, a British welfare activist.

== Life ==
Hobhouse was born in St Ive, near Liskeard in Cornwall, the son of Reginald Hobhouse, an Anglican clergyman, and Caroline Trelawny. He attended Marlborough College before reading Greats at Corpus Christi College, Oxford, where he graduated with a first-class degree in 1887. Upon his graduation, Hobhouse remained at Oxford as a prize fellow at Merton College before becoming a full fellow at Corpus Christi. Taking a break from academia between 1897 and 1907, Hobhouse worked as a journalist (including a stint with the Manchester Guardian) and as the secretary of a trade union. In 1907, Hobhouse returned to academia, accepting the newly created chair of sociology at the University of London, titled the Martin White Professor of Sociology, where he remained until his death in 1929.

Hobhouse was also an atheist from an early age, despite his father being an archdeacon. He believed that rational tests could be applied to values and that they could be self-consistent and objective.

Hobhouse was never religious. He wrote in 1883 that he was "in politics... a firm radical. In religion... an (if possible yet firmer) agnostic". In terms of his political and philosophical views, Hobhouse was Gladstonian; a devoted follower of the philosopher John Stuart Mill; and an admirer of John Morley, Bradlaugh; and Sir Charles Dilke, 2nd Baronet. These influences led him to various feminist, democratic and secularist political stances. He often proposed republican and democratic motions at debating societies while he was at school.

== Economic policy ==
Hobhouse was important in underpinning the turn-of-the-century 'New Liberal' movement of the Liberal Party under leaders like H. H. Asquith and David Lloyd George. He distinguished between property held 'for use' and property held 'for power'. Governmental co-operation with trade unions could therefore be justified as helping to counter the structural disadvantage of employees in terms of power. He also theorised that property was acquired not only by individual effort but by societal organisation. Essentially, wealth had a social dimension and was a collective product. That means that those who had property owed some of their success to society and thus had some obligation to others. He believed that to provide theoretical justification for a level of redistribution provided by the new state pensions.

Hobhouse disliked Marxist socialism and described his own position as liberal socialism and later as social liberalism. Hobhouse thus occupied a particularly-important place in the intellectual history of the Liberal Democrats.

== Civil liberty ==
His work also presents a positive vision of liberalism in which the purpose of liberty is to enable individuals to develop, not solely that freedom is good in itself. Hobhouse said that coercion should be avoided not for lack of regard for other people's well-being but because coercion is ineffective at improving their lot.

While rejecting the practical doctrines of classical liberalism like laissez-faire, Hobhouse praised the work of earlier classical liberals like Richard Cobden in dismantling an archaic order of society and older forms of coercion. Hobhouse believed that one of the defining characteristics of liberalism was its emancipatory character, something that he believed ran constant from classical liberalism to the social liberalism he advocated. He nevertheless emphasised the various forms of coercion already existing in society apart from government. Therefore, he proposed that to promote liberty, the state must ameliorate other forms of social coercion.

Hobhouse held out hope that Liberals and what would now be called the social democrat tendency in the nascent Labour Party could form a grand progressive coalition.

== Foreign policy ==
Hobhouse was often disappointed that fellow collectivists in Britain at the time also tended to be imperialists. Hobhouse opposed the Boer War, and his sister, Emily Hobhouse, did much to draw attention to the abject conditions in the concentration camps established by the British Army in South Africa. Initially opposing the First World War, he later came to support the war effort. He was an internationalist and disliked the pursuit of British national interests as practised by the governments of the day. During the war, Hobhouse criticised the British Idealists such as Bernard Bosanquet in his book The Metaphysical Theory of the State (1918) for being Hegelians and therefore Germanizers.

== Works ==
- The Labour Movement (1893) reprinted 1912
- Theory of Knowledge: a contribution to some problems of logic and metaphysics (1896)
- Mind in Evolution (1901)
- Democracy and Reaction (1905)
- Morals in Evolution: a Study in Comparative Ethics in two volumes (1906)

- Part I
- Part II

- Liberalism (1911)
- Social Evolution and Political Theory (1911)
- Development and Purpose (1913)
- The Material Culture and Social Institutions of the Simpler Peoples : An Essay in Correlation (London: Chapman and Hall, 1915, reprinted 1930).
- Questions Of War And Peace (1916)
- The Metaphysical Theory of the State: a criticism (1918)
- The Rational Good: a study in the logic of practice (1921)
- The Elements of Social Justice (1922)
- Social Development: its Nature and Conditions (1924)
- Sociology and Philosophy: a Centenary Collection of Essays and Articles (1966), with a preface by Sydney Caine and an introduction by Morris Ginsberg

== See also ==
- Reason and Revolution
- Contributions to liberal theory
