= Karen Hagemann =

German-American historian (born 1955)

- Born: December 17, 1955 (age 70); Hamburg, West Germany
- Education: University of Hamburg (PhD)
- Occupations: Historian, author
- Writing career
- Notable works: Revisiting Prussia’s Wars Against Napoleon: History, Culture, and Memory (2015); “Mannlicher Muth und Teutsche Ehre”. Nation, Militär und Geschlecht zur Zeit der Antinapoleonischen Kriege Preußens (2002); Frauenalltag und Männerpolitik. Alltagsleben und gesellschaftliches Handeln von Arbeiterfrauen in der Weimarer Republik (1992)
- Website: history.unc.edu/people/faculty/karen-hagemann

Karen Hagemann (born December 17, 1955) is a German-American historian. She holds the James G. Kenan Distinguished Professor chair at the University of North Carolina at Chapel Hill. Her research focuses on Modern German, European and Transatlantic history, the history of politics, culture and society, the history of military and war and women’s and gender history.

She studied History, German Language and Literature, and Educational Sciences at the University of Hamburg, where she received her PhD in 1989. The title of her dissertation is “Frauenalltag und Männerpolitik. Alltagsleben und gesellschaftliches Handeln von Arbeiterfrauen in der Weimarer Republik” (Women’s Lives and Men’s Politics: Working-class Women’s Everyday Life and Social Action in the Weimar Republic). Her thesis adviser was Klaus Saul. From 1987 to 2001 she taught German and European history and women’s and gender history at Technische Universität Berlin, first at the Department of History and since 1995 at the Interdisciplinary Center for Gender Studies (ZIFG) at the TU Berlin, which she had co-founded with Karin Hausen. In 2000 she attained her Habilitation. The title of her thesis was “Mannlicher Muth und Teutsche Ehre. Entwürfe von Nation, Krieg und Geschlecht in der Zeit der Antinapoleonischen Kriege Preußens” (Manly Valor and German Honor: Images of the Nation, War and Gender during the Period of Prussia’s Anti-Napoleonic Wars). After visiting professorships at the Technische Universität Berlin, and the University of Trier, from 2003 to 2005, she was Professor of History und Co-director of the Centre for Border Studies at the University of Glamorgan, Wales. Since 2005 she is the James G. Kenan Distinguished Professor of History and Adjunct Professor of the Curriculum in Peace, War, and Defense at the University of North Carolina at Chapel Hill.

Her several fellowships and grants include: 1991 – Fellow at the Swedish Collegium for Advanced Study (SCAS) in Uppsala; 2000/01 – Member of the School of Historical Studies at the Institute for Advanced Study in Princeton; 2004 – Senior Fellow at the Berlin Social Science Center (WZB); 2011/12 John G. Medlin Jr. Fellow of the National Humanities Center, Durham, NC; 2015 – German Transatlantic Program Berlin Prize Fellow of the American Academy in Berlin; and 2025/16 – European Institutes for Advanced Study (EURIAS) Senior Fellow at the Netherlands Institute for Advanced Study (NIAS) in Wassenaar, Netherlands. Her research was supported by the German Academic Scholarship Foundation, the Hans Böckler Foundation, the German Research Foundation, the Gerda Henkel Foundation, and the Max Kade Foundation.

Between 2005 and 2010, she directed together with Cristina Allemann-Ghionda (University of Cologne) and Konrad Jarausch (Leibniz Centre for Contemporary History, Potsdam, ZZF) the project “The German Half-Day Model: A European Sonderweg? The ‘Time Politics’ of Public Education in Post-war Europe: An East-West Comparison” that was funded by the Volkswagen Foundation and the German Federal Ministry of Research and Education. In addition, from 2005 to 2008 she co-directed with Alan Forrest (University of York) and Étienne François (Free University of Berlin) a comparative research group on “Nations, Borders, and Identities: The Revolutionary and Napoleonic Wars in European Experiences and Memories,” which was supported by a grant of the British Arts and Humanities Research Council and the German Research Foundation. This project led to the Palgrave Macmillan Series War, Culture and Society, 1750–1850, she started in 2008 with Rafe Blaufarb (Florida State University) and Alan Forrest.

In March 2024, she co-founded together with Isabelle Deflers (University of the Bundeswehr Munich) and Friederike Hartung (Bundeswehr Centre of Military History and Social Sciences, Potsdam) the research network on Military, War and Gender/Diversity (Militär, Krieg und Geschlecht/Diversität, MKGD), which aims to promote the research approach and subject through intensive interdisciplinary and international collaboration.

== Selected publications ==
- Vergessene Soldatinnen: Frauen im Militär und in den Kriegen Europas seit 1600. Suhrkamp, Berlin 2026, ISBN 978-3-518-58840-6.
- Umkämpftes Gedächtnis: Die Antinapoleonischen Kriege in der deutschen Erinnerung. Schöningh, Paderborn, 2019.
- Revisiting Prussia’s Wars Against Napoleon: History, Culture, and Memory. Cambridge and New York, Cambridge University Press, 2015 (Hans Rosenberg Book Prize of the Central European History Society for the best book in Central European history in 2015), ISBN 9780521152303.
- "Mannlicher Muth und Teutsche Ehre“. Nation, Militär und Geschlecht zur Zeit der Antinapoleonischen Kriege Preußens. Schöningh, Paderborn 2002, ISBN 3-506-74477-1 (Krieg in der Geschichte. Bd. 8).
- Frauenalltag und Männerpolitik. Alltagsleben und gesellschaftliches Handeln von Arbeiterfrauen in der Weimarer Republik. J.H.W. Dietz, Bonn 1990, ISBN 3-8012-5008-3.
- with Jan Kolossa, Gleiche Rechte – Gleiche Pflichten? Der Frauenkampf für „staatsbürgerliche” Gleichberechtigung. Ein Bilder-Lese-Buch zu Frauenalltag und Frauenbewegung in Hamburg. VSA, Hamburg 1990, ISBN 3-87975-528-0.

=== As editor (English only) ===
- with Konrad H. Jarausch, German Migrant-Historians in North America: Transatlantic Careers and Scholarship after 1945. Berghahn, Oxford and New York, Books, 2024.
- with Stefan Dudink and Sonya O. Rose, The Oxford Handbook of Gender, War, and the Western World since 1600. Oxford University Press, New York, 2020 (Winner of the Prize for the Best Reference Work in 2022 by the Society for Military History).
- with Donna Harsch and Friederike Brühöfener, Gendering Post-1945 History: Entanglements. Berghahn Books, Oxford and New York, 2019.
- with Sonya Michel, Gender and the long Postwar: Reconsiderations of the United States and the Two Germanys, 1945-1989. Johns Hopkins University Press, Baltimore and Washington DC, 2014.
- with Alan Forrest and Michael Rowe, War, Demobilization and Memory: The Legacy of War in the Era of Atlantic Revolutions. Palgrave Macmillan, Houndmills, Basingstoke, 2016.
- with Konrad H. Jarausch and Cristina Allemann-Ghionda, Children, Families and States: Time Policies of Child Care, Preschool and Primary Schooling in Europe. Berghahn Books, Oxford and New York, 2011, paperback edition 2013.
- with Alan Forrest and Étienne François, War Memories: The Revolutionary and Napoleonic Wars in Modern European Culture. Palgrave Macmillan, Houndmills, Basingstoke, 2012, paperback edition 2013.
- with Gisela Mettele and Jane Rendall, Gender, War, and Politics: Transatlantic Perspectives, 1775–1830. Palgrave Macmillan, Houndmills, Basingstoke 2010, paperback edition 2013.
- with Alan Forrest and Etienne François, War Memories: The Revolutionary and Napoleonic Wars in Modern European Culture. Palgrave Macmillan, Houndmills, Basingstoke, 2012.
- with Alan Forrest and Jane Rendall, Soldiers, Citizens and Civilians: Experiences and Perceptions of the French Wars, 1790–1820. Palgrave Macmillan, Houndmills, Basingstoke 2009.
- with Sonya Michel and Gunilla Budde, Civil Society and Gender Justice: Historical and Comparative Perspectives. Berghahn, Oxford and New York 2008, paperback edition 2011.
- with Jean Quataert, Gendering Modern German History: Rewriting Historiography. Berghahn Books, Oxford and New York, 2007, paperback 2010 (in German: 2008).
- with Stefan Dudink and Anna Clark, Representing Masculinity: Citizenship in Modern Western Culture. Palgrave Macmillan, Houndmills, Basingstoke 2007.
- with Stefan Dudink and John Tosh, Masculinities in Politics and War: Gendering Modern History. Manchester University Press, Manchester and New York 2004.
- with Stefanie Schüler-Springorum, Home/Front: The Military, War and Gender in Twentieth-Century Germany. Berg Publishers, Oxford and New York, 2002 (in German: 2002).
- with Ida Blom and Catherine Hall, Gendered Nations: Nationalisms and Gender Order in the Long Nineteenth Century. Berg Publishers, Oxford and New York 2000.
