= Catherine Hall =

British academic (born 1946)

Catherine Hall FBA FRHistS
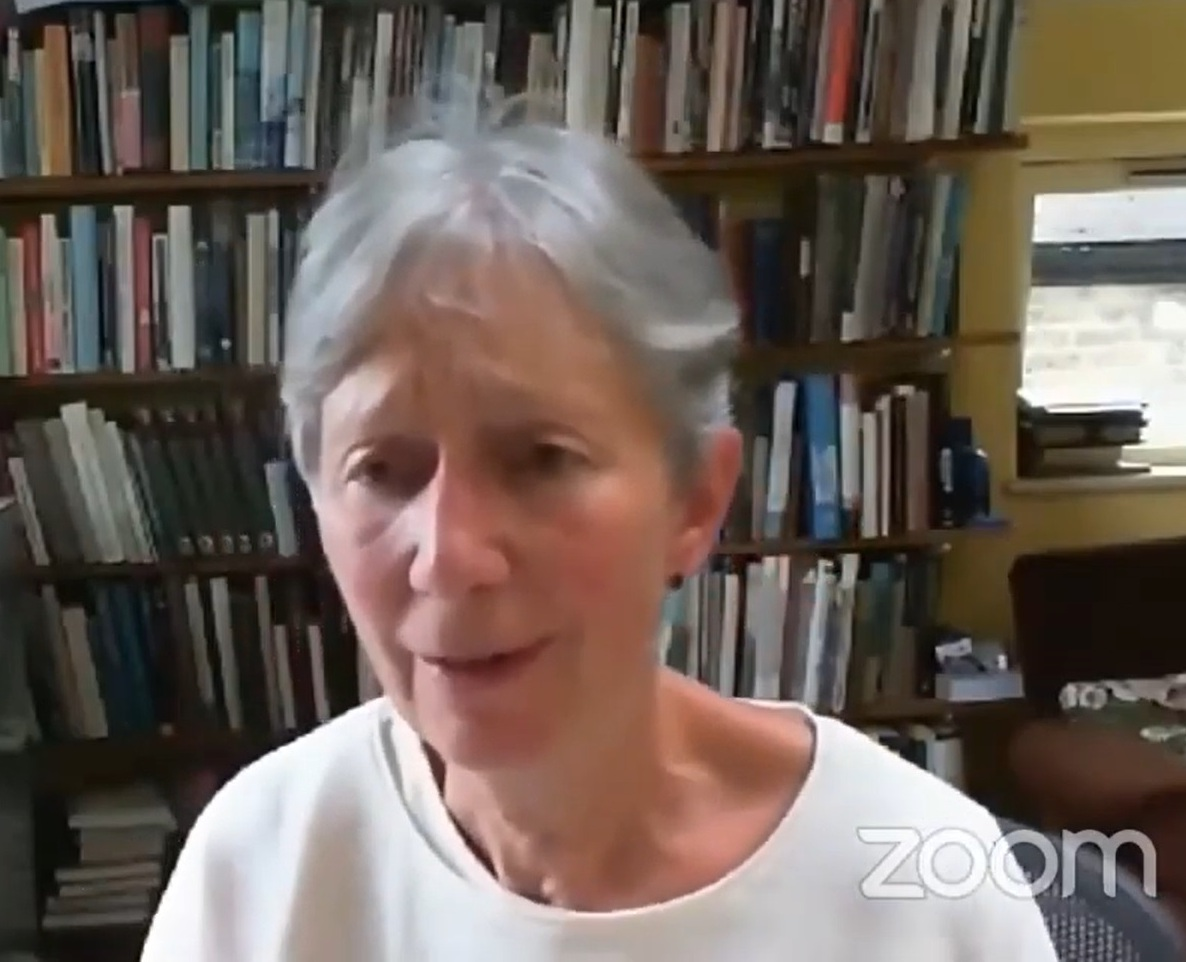
- Hall in 2021
- Born: 1946 (age 79–80); Kettering, Northamptonshire, England
- Spouse: Stuart Hall (m. 1964; died 2014)
- Awards: Morris D. Forkosch Prize; Leverhulme Medal

Academic background
- Education: University of Sussex; University of Birmingham

Academic work
- Discipline: Historian
- Sub-discipline: Feminist history; Postcolonialism; British Empire; 18th century; 19th century; digital scholarship
- School or tradition: New Left
- Institutions: Northeast London Polytechnic; University College London; Centre for the Study of the Legacies of British Slavery

Catherine Hall (born 1946) is a British academic. She is Emerita Professor of Modern British Social and Cultural History at University College London and chair of its digital scholarship project, the Centre for the Study of the Legacies of British Slavery. Her work as a feminist historian focuses on the 18th and 19th centuries, and the themes of gender, class, race, and empire.

== Early life and education ==
Catherine Barrett (later Hall) was born in 1946 in Kettering, Northamptonshire, England. Her father, John Barrett, was a Baptist minister, while her mother, Gladys, came from a family of millers. Her parents met at Oxford University, where Gladys was studying history. When Catherine was three years old, the family moved to Leeds, Yorkshire, and she grew up there in a non-conformist household; both parents were "radical Labour". She went to grammar school, where she says she had an excellent education.

She then attended the University of Sussex at Falmer, but was living between Brighton and London, having met her future husband, Stuart Hall, who lived in London. She found herself out of place among the "stylish, metropolitan types" and bewildered by the emphasis on the multidisciplinary syllabus at Sussex. She moved to the University of Birmingham, where Stuart had moved to set up the Centre for Cultural Studies, and she completed a traditional history degree, developing an interest in medieval history.

== Advocacy and other interests ==
Hall was involved in student politics and activism in Birmingham around 1968, but then had a baby, which changed her life. She got involved in the women's movement, became a feminist historian, and co-wrote Family Fortunes with Leonore Davidoff in 1987.

In the early 1960s, she participated in a march for Campaign for Nuclear Disarmament.

In 1970, Hall attended the UK's first National Women's Liberation Conference at Ruskin College, Oxford. She was a member of the Feminist Review collective between 1981 and 1997.

== Academic career ==
Hall is a feminist historian, known for her work on gender, class, race and empire between 1700 and 1900.

She was employed as a "gender historian" at the Northeast London Polytechnic (now the University of East London) in the late 1980s, which involved looking at history from a feminist perspective, creating a new discipline subsequently known as feminist history. During this time, the discipline of postcolonialism developed, and she became interested in this topic.

She was appointed Professor of Modern British Social and Cultural History University College London (UCL) in 1998, and was Principal Investigator of the "Legacies of British Slave Ownership" and "Structure and Significance of British-Caribbean Slave Ownership, 1763–1833" research projects. She retired from her professorship on 31 July 2016.

As of May 2022, she is Emerita Professor of Modern British Social and Cultural History at UCL and chair of its digital scholarship project, the Centre for the Study of the Legacies of British Slavery, on which she has worked since 2009.

== Awards and recognition ==
- 2002: Morris D. Forkosch Prize in British History from the American Historical Association
- 2016: Offered the Dan David Prize from the Dan David Foundation in Tel Aviv, Israel, which included a £225,000 research fund; however, in support of the Boycott, Divestment and Sanctions movement in, Hall rejected the award, stating that it was "an independent political choice" to do so.
- 2018: elected Fellow of the British Academy (FBA)
- 2019: Honorary degree from the University of York
- 2021: Leverhulme Medal, awarded by the British Academy "in recognition of Professor Hall's impact across modern and contemporary British history, particularly in the fields of class, gender, empire and postcolonial history"
- 2024: Medlicott Medal, awarded by the Historical Association

== Personal life ==
Hall met her future husband, cultural theorist and activist Stuart Hall, on a Campaign for Nuclear Disarmament march in the early 1960s, and the two would go on to marry in 1964. The couple had a daughter, Becky, and son, Jess, and the family lived in Birmingham, England. Stuart was Jamaican, and with mixed-race children, Catherine was aware of the legacy of British colonialism before commencing her academic work on the topic.

Stuart died in 2014. In May 2016, Hall donated 3,000 books from his library to Housmans bookshop.

== Published works ==
=== Books ===
- Family Fortunes: Men and Women of the English Middle Class 1780–1850 (1987, new edition 2002; with Leonore Davidoff)
- White, Male and Middle-Class: Explorations in Feminism And History (1992)
- Gendered Nations: Nationalisms and Gender Order in the Long Nineteenth Century (2000; editor, with Ida Blom and Karen Hagemann)
- Defining The Victorian Nation: Class, Race, Gender and the British Reform Act of 1867 (2000; editor, with Keith McClelland and Jane Rendall)
- Cultures of Empire: Colonisers in Britain and the Empire in Nineteenth and Twentieth Centuries (2000; editor)
- Civilising Subjects: Metropole and Colony in the English Imagination, 1830–1867 (2002)
- At Home with the Empire: Metropolitan Culture and the Imperial World (2006; editor, with Sonya O. Rose)
- Race, Nation and Empire: Making Histories, 1750 to the Present (2010; editor, with Keith McClelland)
- Macaulay and Son: Architects of Imperial Britain (2012)
- Lucky Valley: Edward Long and the History of Racial Capitalism (2024)

=== Articles ===
- "Writing History, Making 'Race': Slave-Owners and Their Stories". Australian Historical Studies. 47 (3). Informa UK Limited: 365–380. 31 August 2016. doi:10.1080/1031461x.2016.1202291. ISSN 1031-461X. S2CID 152113669 – via Taylor & Francis Online. (Full text can also be requested via Researchgate.)
