= Conjunctural analysis =

Marxist method of social and cultural analysis

Conjunctural analysis is a form of social and cultural analysis associated with the cultural theorist Stuart Hall.

== Development ==
According to Juha Koivisto and Mikko Lahtinen, the origins of conjuctural analysis can be traced to the emergence of the discipline of history from astrology, as early modern theorists such as Ibn Khaldun, Giambattista Vico and Niccolò Machiavelli started to explain wordly "coniunctionistas" independently of divine fate, leading 20th-century Marxist philosopher Louis Althusser to call Machiavelli "the first theorist of the conjuncture". They say that Karl Marx took up this approach to understanding the long-term causes of specific historical "constellations" (Konstellationen) or "conjuncture[s] of circumstances", a language later echoed by Vladimir Lenin and Rosa Luxemburg in their historical materialism.

Geographers Eric Sheppard et al. define conjunctural analysis as "a social science epistemology rooted in deeply contextualized and situated modes of explanation,... initially developed by the philosophers Antonio Gramsci and Louis Althusser to understand how particular spatiotemporal conjunctures diverge from the general structural tendencies driving society, and to identify emancipatory political interventions for social transformations." Koivisto and Lahtinen say that Gramsci initially emphasised the fluctuating and occasional nature of the conjuncture, in contrast to the relatively permanent or organic, associating it with tactics rather than strategy, but that in editing his Prison Notebooks, he started to develop a more strategic understanding of conjucture. He emphasised the relative autonomy of different levels of historical and social reality, requiring an analysis that didn't reduce everything to the economic base (which he called "economism") or see the cultural superstructure as resulting from the will of individuals ("voluntarism"). Understanding the rise of fascism was a key task for conjunctural analysis for Gramsci.

Geographer Jamie Peck and historian Samuel Kinser also trace the origins of conjunctural analysis to the historian Fernand Braudel and his "Annales school" of social history. Kinser quotes Braudel saying in 1966: "I am a 'structuralist' by temperament, little intrigued by the event and only half-way engaged by the conjuncture, that grouping of events of the same kind", but notes that in the 1960s he increasingly emphasised the importance of "conjuncture", drawing on the work of economic historians:

An economic conjuncture is a cycle of change, such as a rise and fall in the price of wheat. Between 1850 and 1950 economists developed great sophistication in tracing these cycles, discovering among other things that seasonal (one-year) and short-term (five- to ten-year) fluctuations in prices were carried along or subtended by longer cycles of change. Braudel generalized the idea of economic conjuncture by giving it the form of a quantifiable time-lapse on either side of a normative 'center,' so that conjuncture could be applied to any formof human activity by considering only the outline of the activity and its fluctuation away from or back toward its norm."

Peck expands on this:

Braudel maintained that the analysis and theorization of world-economies must attend not only to their “vibrating surfaces,” but also to their underlying conditions of existence. He believed that the “only” method capable of shedding light on these “historical monsters” was a variant of conjunctural history, tracing the “combination of movements” underpinning capitalism’s restless topography. Characteristically “lumpy,” conjunctural histories are however neither erratic, nor do they tend in a unidirectional fashion towards maturation, equilibrium, or some teleological destination.

According to Koivisto and Lahtinen, conjuncture was absolutely central to Althusser's structuralist Marxism or "aleatory materialism", defining it as indicating "the exact balance of forces, [the] state of overdetermination of the contradictions at any given moment to which political tactics must be applied". By emphasising the conjuncture, Althusser emphasised an analysis that opened the possibility of finding a way of acting on history.

Nicos Poulantzas built on Lenin and Althusser, defining conjucture as "the nodal point where the contradictions of the various levels of a formation are condensed", the concrete expression of the current state of class struggle.

== Stuart Hall and British cultural studies ==
[A] conjuncture is not a slice of time [or a period], but can only be defined by the accumulation/condensation of contradictions, the fusion or merger … of “different currents and circumstances”. (Hall 1980:165)

— Stuart Hall, 1980

According to geographer Matthew Thompson, "Conjunctural thinking arguably first cohered as a distinctive approach to social critique the last time the imperial core witnessed multiple crises coalescing to produce instability, uncertainty, challenge and opportunity. That moment was the late 1970s, when the postwar Fordist-Keynesian settlement was coming apart at the seams, contested by progressive new social movements as well as reactionary forces on the rise." Sheppard et al. say that Stuart Hall and collaborators in British cultural studies drew on Gramsci and Althusser to undertake "a pioneering conjunctural analysis of the crisis of Fordism and the rise of Thatcherism in Britain, which stretches back historically and teases out the complex relations between the general and the particular." According to the Stuart Hall Archive, Hall and his colleagues at the Centre for Contemporary Cultural Studies (CCCS)

developed a distinct approach to the analysis of the complex structures and forces operative within a given historical moment of change (or continuity). Derived from a creative, but rigorous engagement with the works of Antonio Gramsci, ‘conjunctural analysis’ enabled Hall and the CCCS to discern the political, ideological, cultural and economic forces that shaped Britain in the 1970s and 1980s, providing insight into the emergent ‘right-authoritarian populism’ of the Thatcher government and the failures of the ‘old left’ of the Labour Party. Throughout his life, Hall frequently suggested that the concepts, theories, and practice of conjunctural analysis would itself have to be continually refashioned, reconstructed, to achieve the ‘concrete in thought’ adequate to political intervention in the world."

The crises of the 1970s were to be followed by the world-shattering political accession of Mrs. Thatcher … and the blitzkrieg launched by “Thatcherism”, with its contradictory authoritarian and neo-liberal, strong state/free market impulses, on the social fabric … Few believed that this was a historic turning point. They defined it as another of the usual swings of the political pendulum. But those of us who had heard the ugly sound of an old conjuncture unravelling, watched the crisis unfold, understood its populist roots and its long-term hegemonic project, were in a position to know differently.

— Hall et al

Hall applied his conjuctural analysis to shifting right-wing politics in the 1970s and 1980s - building on Poulantzas' concept of "authoritarian statism" to show that the specific form authoritarianism took in the UK then was "authoritarian populism", which secured popular consent by responding to real concerns and anxieties among the dominated classes - and later Blairism, which he saw as operating within the terrain of Thatcherism. Geographer Gillian Hart notes (citing his 1980 essay "Popular-Democratic vs. Authoritarian Populism: Two Ways of Taking Democracy Seriously”) that Hall insisted that "a conjuncture is not a slice of time or a period, but amoment that ‘can only be deﬁned by the accumulation/condensation of contradictions, the fusion or merger – to use Lenin’s terms – of "diﬀerent currents and circumstances"’". Hall said "I am a radical conjuncturalist in this sense that I think [that], when the conjucture shifts, everything shifts."

The journal Soundings took up Hall's approach in the 21st century. In a 2010 article there, "Interpreting the crisis", Hall and Doreen Massey wrote: "Conjunctural analysis is a way of looking at the social, political, economic and cultural contradictions in any particular period of political settlement, and trying to understand how they are articulated to produce that settlement – and how an alternative political project might seek to produce a different settlement, through different forms of articulation."

== In geography ==
Doreen Massey was influenced by British cultural studies, New Left politics and Althusserian Marxism and elaborated many aspects of conjuctural analysis in the understanding of space and place. According to Thompson:

amidst the intersecting crises condensing in the 2008 global financial implosion, Hall's collaborations with Doreen Massey in journals such as Soundings..., alongside Massey's abiding focus on articulation, complementing Hall's..., did much to seed conjunctural thinking in geography as well as urban studies more broadly. This deeply relational and political conception of the conjuncture built upon work in this register initiated by Gramsci (1971), and extended by Hall (1986) – a register adapted for geography through Gillian Hart's dialectical-relational approach to understanding global conjunctures as ‘major turning points when interconnected forces at multiple levels, domains, and spatial scales in different regions of the world come together to generate new conditions with worldwide implications and reverberations’ (Hart, 2024: 151). Here, socio-spatial change is produced, in Gramsci's (1971) terms, by relations of force at various levels – social, political, military – from urban and national-popular movements to imperial manoeuvrings between nation-states... Politics is front and centre in these approaches to the conjuncture. Indeed, the point is to change it.

In the 2020s, conjunctural analysis has been taken up in the disciplines of geography and urban studies. Jamie Peck, who references the work of urban sociologist Neil Brenner as well as Hall and Massey, has particularly championed this approach, and sought to define it:

Conjunctural analysis is a rather enigmatic practice, observed mostly after the fact and in feats of exemplary execution, apparently somewhat resistant to codification, and maybe too modish for methodological rules. Predicated on the analysis of politically salient ‘situations’, conjunctural approaches combine reflexive theorizing with socially engaged inquiry and context-rich, historicized modes of analysis... the methodological implications of this rather elusive approach [include]: attention to complex states of causal codetermination, ‘in articulation’; an orientation to relational and ‘unbounded’ modes of inquiry; an emphasis on the stress-testing of received theory claims and conceptual categories, often in anomalous (as opposed to ‘typical’) situations; and a commitment to reflexivity, context-engaged analysis, and ‘thick’ theorization.

He also says that conjuctural analysis is "a mode of analysis that works deliberately across levels of abstraction in dialogue with evolving midlevel formulations and connective concepts".

== See also ==
- Cultural hegemony
