= Bill Schwarz =

British historian (born 1951)

- Born: 22 December 1951 (age 74)

Academic background
- Education: University of York; Centre for Contemporary Studies at Birmingham University

Academic work
- Discipline: English; history
- Institutions: Queen Mary University of London
- Main interests: Postcolonial history
- Notable works: Memories of Empire: The White Man's World (2011)

Bill Schwarz (born 22 December 1951) is an English historian, who is a Professor in the School of English and Drama at Queen Mary, University of London, his research focusing on postcolonial history. Schwarz is the author of Memories of Empire: The White Man's World, which was Book of the Year at the Longman/History Today Awards in 2013. He is literary executor, with Catherine Hall, of cultural theorist Stuart Hall, whose posthumously published memoir Familiar Stranger: A Life Between Two Islands was co-written with Schwarz. He is an editor of History Workshop Journal, and General Editor (with Catherine Hall) of the Duke University Press series "The Writings of Stuart Hall".

== Early life ==
Schwarz was born on 22 December 1951.

== Career ==
=== Academia ===
Bill Schwarz studied English and history at the University of York, before going on to do graduate work at the Centre for Contemporary Studies at Birmingham University, where he was a student of Stuart Hall. Schwarz taught sociology and politics at the University of Warwick, cultural studies at the University of East London, and media and communications at Goldsmiths, University of London, before moving in 2004 to Queen Mary College, where he is Professor of English, focusing in his research on postcolonial history.

He has also lectured at numerous other educational institutions internationally, including Vanderbilt University, Duke University, North Carolina University, Stony Brook University, the University of the West Indies, Michigan University, the University of South Australia, Sydney University, the University of Montpellier, Copenhagen University, the University of California, Berkeley and the American University in Paris.

=== Writing ===
Schwarz has written and edited books on postcolonialism, British cultural and political history, and 20th-century Caribbean and North American writers including George Lamming, Earl Lovelace, and James Baldwin.

Schwarz's 2011 work Memories of Empire: The White Man's World, a study of colonial society towards the end of the British Empire, and the first of a three-volume history, was named Book of the Year at the Longman/History Today Awards in 2013.

He co-authored Stuart Hall's posthumously published memoir Familiar Stranger: A Life Between Two Islands (2017), about which Colin Grant wrote in The Guardian: "The conversational tone of the book has emerged from the hours of interviews Schwarz conducted with Hall over a number of years. The project began as a collaboration, and clearly Schwarz is a faithful amanuensis. Answering the need to reduce this material to a manageable form, he arranges each chapter with a foreword, argument and afterword, which gives the flavour of an extended series of talks. ... Familiar Stranger reads as a subtle and subversive memoir of the end of empire." The reviewer for Black Perspectives concluded: "An undeniable boon to cultural and postcolonial studies, Stuart Hall and Bill Schwarz's Familiar Stranger turns the traditional memoir on its head, and produced an engaging exchange about race, identity, colonialism, and culture."

== Selected bibliography ==
- West Indian Intellectuals in Britain (Studies in Imperialism series), Manchester University Press, 2003, ISBN 978-0719064746; paperback ISBN 978-0719064753
- Memories of Empire: The White Man's World (Volume I), Oxford University Press, 2011, ISBN 978-0199296910; paperback 2013, ISBN 978-0199686032
- With Stuart Hall, Familiar Stranger: A Life Between Two Islands, Durham, NC: Duke University Press, 2017, ISBN 978-0-8223-6387-3

As editor

- The Locations of George Lamming, Warwick University Caribbean Studies series, Macmillan, Oxford, 2007, ISBN 978-1405067829
- Caribbean Literature After Independence. The Case of Earl Lovelace, Institute for the Study of the Americas, 2008, ISBN 978-1900039918
- With Susannah Radstone, Memory. Histories, Theories, Debates, Fordham University Press, 2010, ISBN 978-0823232598 paperback
- With Cora Kaplan, James Baldwin. America and Beyond, University of Michigan Press, 2011, ISBN 978-0472071524; paperback ISBN 978-0472051526
- With Rachael Gilmour, End of Empire and the English Novel since 1945, Manchester University Press, 2011, ISBN 978-0719085789; 2015 paperback ISBN 978-0719097454
