= Stuart Hall (cultural theorist) =

Jamaican-British Marxist sociologist, cultural theorist, and activist (1932–2014)

Stuart Hall FBA
- Born: Stuart Henry McPhail Hall; 3 February 1932; Kingston, British Jamaica
- Died: 10 February 2014 (aged 82); London, England
- Occupations: Sociologist, cultural theorist, political activist
- Known for: Founding New Left Review
- Spouse: Catherine Hall (m. 1964)
- Children: 2, including Jess

Academic background
- Education: Merton College, Oxford (M.A.)
- Influences: Louis Althusser; Roland Barthes; Umberto Eco; Michel Foucault; Antonio Gramsci; Richard Hoggart; Karl Marx; Raymond Williams

Academic work
- Discipline: Cultural studies; sociology
- School or tradition: Birmingham School of Cultural Studies; Marxist sociology New Left
- Institutions: University of Birmingham; Open University
- Doctoral students: Paul Gilroy
- Notable students: Gregor McLennan
- Notable ideas: Encoding/decoding model of communication, conjunctural analysis, authoritarian populism, new ethnicities
- Influenced: Les Back; Rey Chow; Ashley Dawson; Michael Denning; Brent Hayes Edwards; Lawrence Grossberg; Dick Hebdige; Ralina Joseph; Isaac Julien; Roshini Kempadoo
- Website: www.stuarthallfoundation.org

Stuart Henry McPhail Hall (3 February 1932 – 10 February 2014) was a Jamaican-British Marxist sociologist, cultural theorist, and political activist. Hall – along with Richard Hoggart and Raymond Williams – was one of the founding figures of cultural studies and in particular the school of thought known as British Cultural Studies or the Birmingham School of Cultural Studies.

In the 1950s, Hall was a founder of the influential journal New Left Review. At Hoggart's invitation, he joined the Centre for Contemporary Cultural Studies (CCCS) at the University of Birmingham in 1964. Hall took over from Hoggart as acting director of the CCCS in 1968, became its director in 1972, and remained there until 1979. While at the centre, Hall is credited with playing a role in expanding the scope of cultural studies to deal with race and gender, and with helping to incorporate new ideas derived from the work of French theorists such as Michel Foucault.

Hall left the centre in 1979 to become a professor of sociology at the Open University. He was President of the British Sociological Association from 1995 to 1997. He retired from the Open University in 1997 and was professor emeritus there until his death. British newspaper The Observer called him "one of the country's leading cultural theorists". Hall was also involved in the Black Arts Movement. Movie directors such as John Akomfrah and Isaac Julien also see him as one of their heroes.

Hall was married to Catherine Hall, a feminist professor of modern British history at University College London, with whom he had two children. After his death, Stuart Hall was described as "one of the most influential intellectuals of the last sixty years". The Stuart Hall Foundation was established in 2015 by his family, friends and colleagues to "work collaboratively to forge creative partnerships in the spirit of Stuart Hall; thinking together and working towards a racially just and more equal future."

== Biography ==
Stuart Henry McPhail Hall was born on 3 February 1932 in Kingston, Colony of Jamaica, into a middle-class family. His parents were Herman McPhail Hall and Jessie Merle Hopwood. Herman's direct ancestors were English, living in Jamaica for several centuries, tracing back to the Kingston tavern-keeper John Hall (1722–1797) and his Dutch wife Allegonda Boom. Hall's direct paternal ancestors were implicated in the trans-Atlantic slave trade and slavery in Jamaica, being associated with the Grecian Regale Plantation, Saint Andrew Parish. Hall's mother was descended through her mother from John Rock Grosset, a local pro-slavery Tory member of Parliament. According to the 1820 Jamaica Almanac, Stuart's great-great-great-grandfather John Herman Hall owned 20 enslaved Black African people. His ancestors were Portuguese, Jews, English, Africans and Indians.

As a teen he had been baptized in an Evangelical Youth Group. He attended the all-male Jamaica College, one of the island's elite establishments, receiving an education modeled after the British school system. In an interview, Hall describes himself as a "bright, promising scholar" in these years and his formal education as "a very 'classical' education; very good but in very formal academic terms." With the help of sympathetic teachers, he expanded his education to include "T. S. Eliot, James Joyce, Freud, Marx, Lenin and some of the surrounding literature and modern poetry", as well as "Caribbean literature". Hall's later works reveal that growing up in the pigmentocracy of the colonial West Indies, where he was of darker skin than much of his family, had a profound effect on his views.

In 1951, Hall won a Rhodes Scholarship to Merton College at the University of Oxford, where he studied English and obtained a Master of Arts degree, becoming part of the Windrush generation, the first large-scale emigration of West Indians, as that community was then known. He originally intended to do graduate work on the medieval poem Piers Plowman, reading it through the lens of contemporary literary criticism, but was dissuaded by his language professor, J. R. R. Tolkien, who told him "in a pained tone that this was not the point of the exercise." Hall began a doctorate on Henry James at Oxford but, galvanised particularly by the 1956 Soviet invasion of Hungary (which saw many thousands of members leave the Communist Party of Great Britain (CPGB) and look for alternatives to previous orthodoxies) and the Suez Crisis, abandoned this in 1957 or 1958 to focus on his political work. In 1957, he joined the Campaign for Nuclear Disarmament (CND) and it was on a CND march that he met his future wife. From 1958 to 1960, Hall worked as a teacher in a London secondary modern school and in adult education, and in 1964 married Catherine Hall, concluding around this time that he was unlikely to return permanently to the Caribbean.

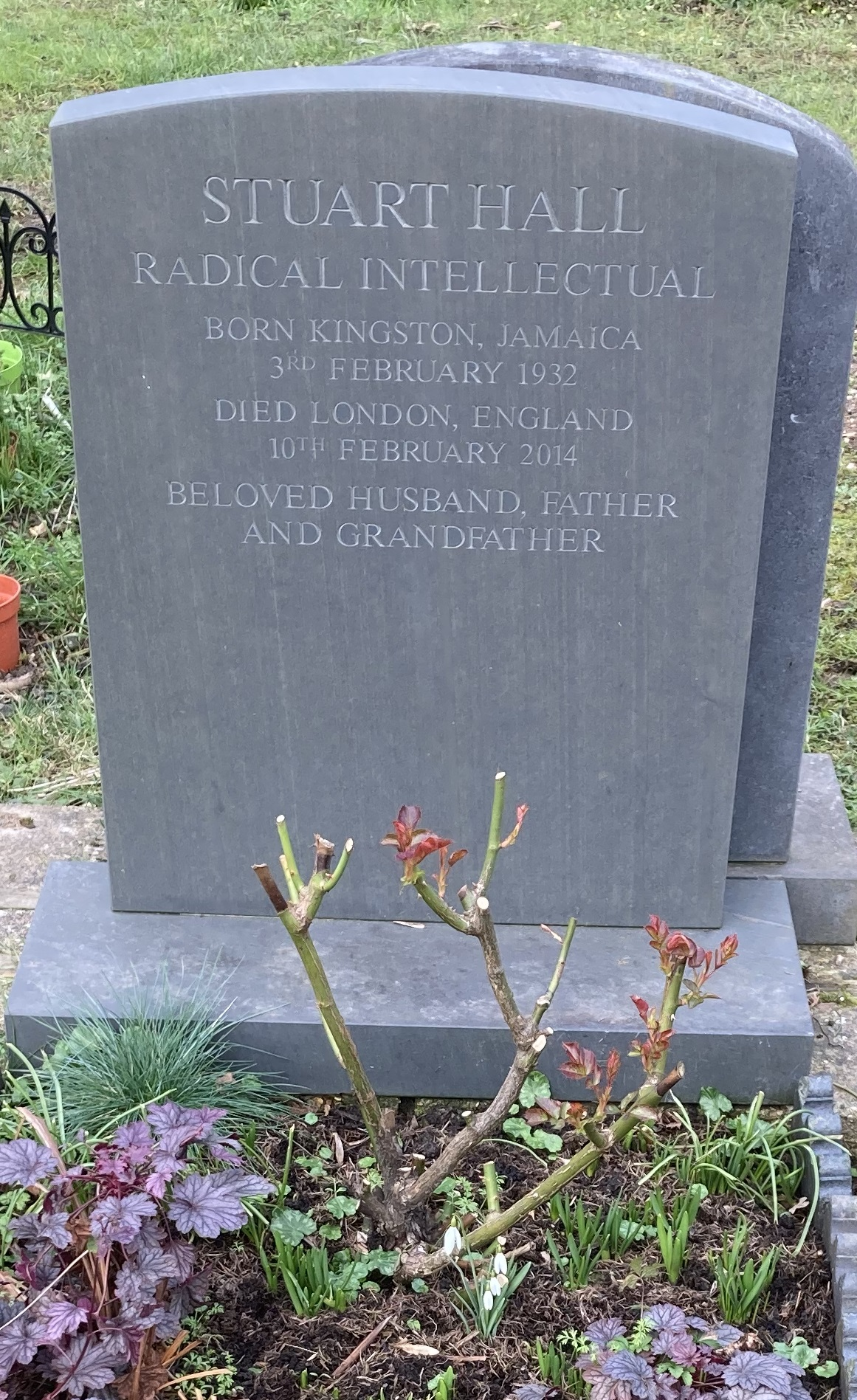
Hall's grave in Highgate Cemetery (east side)

After working on the Universities and Left Review during his time at Oxford, Hall joined E. P. Thompson, Raymond Williams and others to merge it with The New Reasoner journal, launching the New Left Review in 1960, with Hall as the founding editor. In 1958, the same group, with Raphael Samuel, launched the Partisan Coffee House in Soho as a meeting place for left-wingers. Hall left the board of the New Left Review in 1961 or 1962.

Hall's academic career took off in 1964 after he co-wrote with Paddy Whannel of the British Film Institute "one of the first books to make the case for the serious study of film as entertainment", The Popular Arts. As a direct result, Richard Hoggart invited Hall to join the Centre for Contemporary Cultural Studies at the University of Birmingham, initially as a research fellow at Hoggart's own expense. In 1968, Hall became director of the centre. He wrote a number of influential articles in the years that followed, including Situating Marx: Evaluations and Departures (1972) and Encoding and Decoding in the Television Discourse (1973) and The Great Moving Right Show (for Marxism Today), in which he famously coined the term 'Thatcherism'. He also contributed to the book Policing the Crisis (1978) and coedited the influential Resistance Through Rituals (1975).

Shortly before Margaret Thatcher became Prime Minister in 1979, Hall and Maggie Steed presented "It Ain't Half Racist Mum", an Open Door programme made by the Campaign Against Racism in the Media (CARM), which tackled racial stereotypes and contemporary British attitudes to immigration. After his appointment as a professor of sociology at the Open University (OU) that year, Hall published further influential books, including The Hard Road to Renewal (1988), Formations of Modernity (1992), Questions of Cultural Identity (1996) and Cultural Representations and Signifying Practices (1997). Through the 1970s and 1980s, Hall was closely associated with the journal Marxism Today; in 1995, he was a founding editor of Soundings: A Journal of Politics and Culture.

He spoke internationally on Cultural Studies, including a series of lectures in 1983 at the University of Illinois at Urbana-Champaign that were recorded and would decades later form the basis of the 2016 book Cultural Studies 1983: A Theoretical History (edited by Jennifer Slack and Lawrence Grossberg).

Hall was the founding chair of Iniva (Institute of International Visual Arts) and the photography organization Autograph ABP (the Association of Black Photographers).

Hall retired from the Open University in 1997. He was elected fellow of the British Academy in 2005 and received the European Cultural Foundation's Princess Margriet Award in 2008. He died on 10 February 2014, from complications following kidney failure, a week after his 82nd birthday. By the time of his death, he was widely known as the "godfather of multiculturalism". His memoir, Familiar Stranger: A Life Between Two Islands (co-authored with Bill Schwarz), was posthumously published in 2017, based on hours of interviews conducted with Hall over many years.

Hall was buried on the eastern side of Highgate Cemetery, where in 2022 an audio artwork by Trevor Mathison explored his legacy. Entitled The Conversation Continues: We Are Still Listening, the 40-minute soundscape was "a re-examination of the lives and histories of those laid to rest at Highgate Cemetery in the context of contemporary anti-racism movements."

== Ideas ==
Hall's work covers issues of hegemony and cultural studies, taking a post-Gramscian stance. He regards language-use as operating within a framework of power, institutions and politics/economics. This view presents people as producers and consumers of culture at the same time. (Hegemony, in Gramscian theory, refers to the socio-cultural production more of "consent" and "coercion".) For Hall, culture was not something to simply appreciate or study, but a "critical site of social action and intervention, where power relations are both established and potentially unsettled".

Hall became one of the main proponents of reception theory, and developed the theory of encoding and decoding. This approach to textual analysis focuses on the scope for negotiation and opposition on the part of the audience. This means that the audience does not simply passively accept a text. Crime statistics, in Hall's view, are often manipulated for political and economic purposes. Moral panics (e.g. over mugging) could thereby be ignited in order to create public support for the need to "police the crisis". The media play a central role in the "social production of news" in order to reap the rewards of lurid crime stories.

Further, Hall is well known for his articulation of the conjuncture and deployment of conjunctural analysis in his work. Hall's concept of the conjuncture offers a method for apprehending the layered, unstable, and contingent character of the present—an articulation of economic, political, and cultural forces whose contradictions come to a head in moments of crisis. For Hall, conjunctural is not about identifying a singular cause or root, but rather about mapping the movement of struggle, that is, the ensemble of forces that stabilize or destabilize a social order, an overdetermination of structure. Drawing from Gramsci's initial articulation of the conjuncture, Hall writes: "What defines the 'conjunctural'—the immediate terrain of struggle—is not simply the given economic conditions, but precisely the 'incessant and persistent' efforts which are being made to defend and conserve the position." As such, the work of conjunctural analysis is an invitation to read the present as a site of rupture, rearticulation, as well as possibility.

In his 2006 essay "Reconstruction Work: Images of Postwar Black Settlement", Hall also interrogates questions of historical memory and visuality in relation to photography as a colonial technology. According to Hall, understanding and writing about the history of black migration and settlement in Britain during the postwar era requires a careful and critical examination of the limited historical archive, and photographic evidence proves itself invaluable. However, photographic images are often perceived as more objective than other representations, which is dangerous. In his view, one must critically examine who produced these images, what purpose they serve, and how they further their agenda (e.g., what has been deliberately included and excluded in the frame). For example, in the context of postwar Britain, photographic images such as those displayed in the Picture Post article "Thirty Thousand Colour Problems" construct black migration, blackness in Britain, as "the problem". They construct miscegenation as "the centre of the problem", as "the problem of the problem", as "the core issue".

Hall's political influence extended to the Labour Party, perhaps related to the influential articles he wrote for the CPGB's theoretical journal Marxism Today (MT) that challenged the left's views of markets and general organisational and political conservatism. This discourse had a profound impact on the Labour Party under both Neil Kinnock and Tony Blair, although Hall later decried New Labour as operating on "terrain defined by Thatcherism".

=== Encoding and decoding model ===
Hall presented his encoding and decoding philosophy in various publications and at several oral events across his career. The first was in "Encoding and Decoding in the Television Discourse" (1973), a paper he wrote for the Council of Europe Colloquy on "Training in the Critical Readings of Television Language" organised by the Council and the Centre for Mass Communication Research at the University of Leicester. It was produced for students at the Centre for Contemporary Cultural Studies, which Paddy Scannell explains: "largely accounts for the provisional feel of the text and its 'incompleteness'". In 1974 the paper was presented at a symposium on Broadcasters and the Audience in Venice. Hall also presented his encoding and decoding model in "Encoding/Decoding" in Culture, Media, Language in 1980. The time difference between Hall's first publication on encoding and decoding in 1973 and his 1980 publication is highlighted by several critics. Of particular note is Hall's transition from the Centre for Contemporary Cultural Studies to the Open University.

Hall had a major influence on cultural studies, and many of the terms his texts set forth continue to be used in the field. His 1973 text is viewed as a turning point in Hall's research toward structuralism and provides insight into some of the main theoretical developments he explored at the Centre for Contemporary Cultural Studies.

Hall takes a semiotic approach and builds on the work of Roland Barthes and Umberto Eco. The essay takes up and challenges longheld assumptions about how media messages are produced, circulated and consumed, proposing a new theory of communication. "The 'object' of production practices and structures in television is the production of a message: that is, a sign-vehicle or rather sign-vehicles of a specific kind organized, like any other form of communication or language, through the operation of codes, within the syntagmatic chains of a discourse."

According to Hall, a message "must be perceived as meaningful discourse and meaningfully de-coded" before it has an "effect", a "use", or satisfies a "need". There are four codes of the encoding/decoding model of communication. The first way of encoding is the dominant (i.e. hegemonic) code. This is the code the encoder expects the decoder to recognize and decode. "When the viewer takes the connoted meaning ... full and straight ... and decodes the message in terms of the reference-code in which it has been coded, ... [it operates] inside the dominant code." The second way of encoding is the professional code. It operates in tandem with the dominant code. "It serves to reproduce the dominant definitions precisely by bracketing the hegemonic quality, and operating with professional codings which relate to such questions as visual quality, news and presentational values, televisual quality, 'professionalism' etc." The third way of encoding is the negotiated code. "It acknowledges the legitimacy of the hegemonic definitions to make the grand significations, while, at a more restricted, situational level, it makes its own ground-rules, it operates with 'exceptions' to the rule." The fourth way of encoding is the oppositional code, also known as the globally contrary code. "It is possible for a viewer perfectly to understand both the literal and connotative inflection given to an event, but to determine to decode the message in a globally contrary way." "Before this message can have an 'effect' (however defined), or satisfy a 'need' or be put to a 'use', it must first be perceived as a meaningful discourse and meaningfully de-coded."

Hall challenged all four components of the mass communications model. He argues that (i) meaning is not simply fixed or determined by the sender; (ii) the message is never transparent; and (iii) the audience is not a passive recipient of meaning. For example, a documentary film on asylum seekers that aims to provide a sympathetic account of their plight does not guarantee that audiences will feel sympathetic. Despite being realistic and recounting facts, the documentary must still communicate through a sign system (the aural-visual signs of TV) that simultaneously distorts the producers' intentions and evokes contradictory feelings in the audience.

Distortion is built into the system, rather than being a "failure" of the producer or viewer. There is a "lack of fit", Hall argues, "between the two sides in the communicative exchange"—that is, between the moment of the production of the message ("encoding") and the moment of its reception ("decoding"). In "Encoding/decoding", Hall suggests media messages accrue common-sense status in part through their performative nature. Through the repeated performance, staging or telling of the narrative of "9/11" (as an example; there are others like it), a culturally specific interpretation becomes not only plausible and universal but elevated to "common sense".

=== Views on cultural identity and the African diaspora ===
In his influential 1996 essay "Cultural Identity and Diaspora", Hall presents two different definitions of cultural identity.

In the first definition, cultural identity is "a sort of collective 'one true self' ... which many people with a shared history and ancestry hold in common." In this view, cultural identity provides a "stable, unchanging and continuous frame of reference and meaning" through the ebb and flow of historical change. This allows the tracing back the origins of descendants and reflecting on the historical experiences of ancestors as a shared truth. Therefore, blacks living in the diaspora need only "unearth" their African past to discover their true cultural identity. While Hall appreciates the good effects this first view of cultural identity has had in the postcolonial world, he proposes a second definition of cultural identity that he views as superior.

Hall's second definition of cultural identity "recognises that, as well as the many points of similarity, there are also critical points of deep and significant difference which constitute 'what we really are'; or rather – since history has intervened – 'what we have become'." In this view, cultural identity is not a fixed essence rooted in the past. Instead, cultural identities "undergo constant transformation" throughout history as they are "subject to the continuous 'play' of history, culture, and power". Thus Hall defines cultural identities as "the names we give to the different ways we are positioned by, and position ourselves within, the narratives of the past." This view of cultural identity was more challenging than the previous due to its dive into deep differences, but nonetheless it showed the mixture of the African diaspora. In other words, for Hall cultural identity is "not an essence but a positioning".

==== Presences ====
Hall describes Caribbean identity in terms of three distinct "presences": the African, the European, and the American. Taking the terms from Aimé Césaire and Léopold Senghor, he describes the three presences: "Présence Africaine", "Présence Européenne", and "Présence Americaine". "Présence Africaine" is the "unspeakable 'presence' in Caribbean culture". According to Hall, the African presence, though repressed by slavery and colonialism, is in fact hiding in plain sight in every aspect of Caribbean society and culture, including language, religion, the arts, and music. For many black people living in the diaspora, Africa becomes an "imagined community" to which they feel a sense of belonging.

However, Hall points out, there is no going back to the Africa that existed before slavery, because Africa too has changed. Secondly, Hall describes the European presence in Caribbean cultural identity as the legacy of colonialism, racism, power and exclusion. Unlike the "Présence Africaine", the European presence is not unspoken even though many would like to be separated from the history of the oppressor. But Hall argues that Caribbeans and diasporic peoples must acknowledge how the European presence has also become an inextricable part of their own identities. Lastly, Hall describes the American presence as the "ground, place, territory" where people and cultures from around the world collided. It is, as Hall puts it, "where the fateful/fatal encounter was staged between Africa and the West", and also where the displacement of the natives occurred.

==== Diasporic identity ====
Because diasporic cultural identity in the Caribbean and throughout the world is a mixture of all these different presences, Hall advocated a "conception of 'identity' that lives with and through, not despite, difference; by hybridity". According to Hall, black people living in diaspora are constantly reinventing themselves and their identities by mixing, hybridizing, and "creolizing" influences from Africa, Europe, and the rest of the world in their everyday lives and cultural practices. Therefore, there is no one-size-fits-all cultural identity for diasporic people, but rather a multiplicity of different cultural identities that share both important similarities and important differences, all of which should be respected.

==== Difference and differance ====
In "Cultural Identity and Diaspora", Hall sheds light on the topic of difference within black identity. He first acknowledges the oneness in the black diaspora and how this unity is at the core of blackness and the black experience. He expresses how this has a unifying effect on the diaspora, giving way to movements such as negritude and the pan-African political project. Hall also acknowledges the deep-rooted "difference" within the diaspora as well. This difference was created by destructive nature of the transatlantic slave trade and the resulting generations of slavery. He describes this difference as what constitutes "what we really are", or the true nature of the diaspora. The duality of such an identity, that expresses deep unity but clear uniqueness and internal distinctness provokes a question out of Hall: "How, then, to describe this play of 'difference' within identity?" Hall's answer is "Différance". The use of the "a" in the word unsettles us from our initial and common interpretation of it, and was originally introduced by Jacques Derrida. This modification of the word difference conveys the separation between spatial and temporal difference, and more adequately encapsulates the nuances of the diaspora.

== Global policy ==
Hall was one of the signatories of the agreement to convene a convention for drafting a world constitution. As a result, for the first time in human history, a World Constituent Assembly convened to draft and adopt the Constitution for the Federation of Earth.

== Legacy ==
- The Stuart Hall Library, Iniva's specialist arts and culture reference library, currently located in Pimlico, London, and founded in 2007, is named after Stuart Hall, who was the chair of the board of Iniva for many years.
- In November 2014, a week-long celebration of Stuart Hall's achievements was held at the University of London's Goldsmiths College, where on 28 November the new Academic Building was renamed in his honour, as the Professor Stuart Hall building (PSH).
- The establishment of the Stuart Hall Foundation in his memory and to continue his life's work was announced in December 2014. The Foundation is "committed to public education, addressing urgent questions of race and inequality in culture and society through talks and events, and building a growing network of Stuart Hall Foundation scholars and artists in residence."
- In May 2016, Housmans bookshop sold Hall's private library. 3,000 books were donated to Housmans by Hall's widow Catherine Hall.
- Artist Claudette Johnson completed a portrait of Hall in 2023. Commissioned by Merton College, the portrait hangs in the Hall at Merton alongside other Fellows and Wardens.

=== Film ===
Hall was a presenter of a seven-part television series entitled Redemption Song — made by Barraclough Carey Productions, and transmitted on BBC2, between 30 June and 12 August 1991 — in which he examined the elements that make up the Caribbean, looking at the turbulent history of the islands and interviewing people who live there today. The series episodes were as follows:

- "Shades of Freedom" (11/08/1991)
- "Following Fidel" (04/08/1991)
- "Worlds Apart" (28 July 1991)
- "La Grande Illusion" (21 July 1991)
- "Paradise Lost" (14 July 1991)
- "Out of Africa" (7 July 1991)
- "Iron in the Soul" (30 June 1991)

Hall's lectures have been turned into several videos distributed by the Media Education Foundation:

- Race, the Floating Signifier (1997).
- Representation & the Media (1997).
- The Origins of Cultural Studies (2006).

Mike Dibb produced a film based on a long interview between journalist Maya Jaggi and Stuart Hall called Personally Speaking (2009).

Hall is the subject of two films directed by John Akomfrah, entitled The Unfinished Conversation (2012) and The Stuart Hall Project (2013). The first film was shown (26 October 2013 – 23 March 2014) at Tate Britain, Millbank, London, while the second is now available on DVD.

The Stuart Hall Project comprised clips drawn from more than 100 hours of archival footage of Hall, woven together over the music of jazz artist Miles Davis, who was an inspiration to both Hall and Akomfrah.

The film's structure is composed of multiple strands. There is a chronological grounding in historical events, such as the Suez Crisis, the Vietnam War, and the Hungarian Uprising of 1956, along with reflections by Hall on his experiences as an immigrant from the Caribbean to Britain. Another historical event vital to the film was the 1958 Notting Hill race riots occasioned by attacks on black people in the area; these protests showed the presence of a black community within England. When discussing the Caribbean, Hall discusses the idea of hybridity and he states that the Caribbean is the home of hybridity. There are also voiceovers and interviews offered without a specific temporal grounding in the film that nonetheless give the viewer greater insights into Hall and his philosophy. Along with the voiceovers and interviews, embedded in the film are also Hall's personal achievements; this is extremely rare, as there are no traditional archives of those Caribbean peoples moulded by the Middle Passage experience.

The film can be viewed as a more pointedly focused take on the Windrush generation, those who migrated from the Caribbean to Britain in the years immediately following the World War II. Hall, himself a member of this generation, focused on the racial discrimination faced by the Windrush generation, contrasting the idealized perceptions among West Indian immigrants of Britain versus the harsher reality they encountered when arriving in the "mother country".

A central theme in the film is diasporic belonging. Hall confronted his own identity within both British and Caribbean communities, and at one point in the film he remarks: "Britain is my home, but I am not English."

In August 2012, Professor Sut Jhally conducted an interview with Hall that touched on a number of themes and issues in cultural studies.

=== Book ===
- McRobbie, Angela (2016). Stuart Hall, Cultural Studies and the Rise of Black and Asian British Art. McRobbie has also written an article in tribute to Hall: "Times with Stuart". OpenDemocracy. 14 February 2014. Archived from the original on 13 July 2014.
- Scott, David (2017). Stuart Hall's Voice: Intimations of an Ethics of Receptive Generosity. Durham: Duke University Press.

== Personal life ==
Hall was married to the feminist historian Catherine Hall. They had two children, including cinematographer Jess Hall.

== Selected publications ==
=== 1960s ===
- Hall, Stuart (March–April 1960). "Crosland territory". New Left Review. I (2): 2–4.
- Hall, Stuart (January–February 1961). "Student journals". New Left Review. I (7): 50–51.
- Hall, Stuart (March–April 1961). "The new frontier". New Left Review. I (8): 47–48.
- Hall, Stuart; Anderson, Perry (July–August 1961). "Politics of the common market". New Left Review. I (10): 1–15.
- Hall, Stuart; Whannell, Paddy (1964). The Popular Arts. London: Hutchinson Educational. OCLC 2915886.
- Hall, Stuart (1968). The Hippies: an American "moment". Birmingham: Centre for Contemporary Cultural Studies. OCLC 12360725.

=== 1970s ===
- Hall, Stuart (1971). Deviancy, Politics and the Media. Birmingham: Centre for Contemporary Cultural Studies.
- Hall, Stuart (1971). "Life and Death of Picture Post", Cambridge Review, vol. 92, no. 2201.
- Hall, Stuart; P. Walton (1972). Situating Marx: Evaluations and Departures. London: Human Context Books.
- Hall, Stuart (1972). "The Social Eye of Picture Post", Working Papers in Cultural Studies, no. 2, pp. 71–120.
- Hall, Stuart (1973). Encoding and Decoding in the Television Discourse. Birmingham: Centre for Contemporary Cultural Studies.
- Hall, Stuart (1973). A 'Reading' of Marx's 1857 Introduction to the Grundrisse. Birmingham: Centre for Contemporary Cultural Studies.
- Hall, Stuart (1974). "Marx's Notes on Method: A 'Reading' of the '1857 Introduction'", Working Papers in Cultural Studies, no. 6, pp. 132–171.
- Hall, Stuart; T. Jefferson (1976), Resistance Through Rituals, Youth Subcultures in Post-War Britain. London: HarperCollinsAcademic.
- Hall, Stuart (1977). "Journalism of the air under review". Journalism Studies Review. 1 (1): 43–45.
- Hall, Stuart; C. Critcher; T. Jefferson; J. Clarke; B. Roberts (1978), Policing the Crisis: Mugging, the State and Law and Order. London: Macmillan. London: Macmillan Press. ISBN 0-333-22061-7 (paperback); ISBN 0-333-22060-9 (hardback).
- Hall, Stuart (January 1979). "The great moving right show". Marxism Today. Amiel and Melburn Collections: 14–20.

=== 1980s ===
- Hall, Stuart (1980). "Encoding / Decoding." In: S. Hall, D. Hobson, A. Lowe, and P. Willis (eds). Culture, Media, Language: Working Papers in Cultural Studies, 1972–79. London: Hutchinson, pp. 128–138.
- Hall, Stuart (1980). "Cultural Studies: two paradigms". Media, Culture & Society. 2 (1): 57–72. doi:10.1177/016344378000200106. S2CID 143637900.
- Hall, Stuart (1980). "Race, Articulation and Societies Structured in Dominance." In: UNESCO (ed). Sociological Theories: Race and Colonialism. Paris: UNESCO. pp. 305–345.
- Hall, Stuart (1981). "Notes on Deconstructing the Popular". In: People's History and Socialist Theory. London: Routledge.
- Hall, Stuart; P. Scraton (1981). "Law, Class and Control". In: M. Fitzgerald, G. McLennan & J. Pawson (eds). Crime and Society, London: RKP.
- Hall, Stuart (1988). The Hard Road to Renewal: Thatcherism and the Crisis of the Left. London: Verso Books.
- Hall, Stuart (June 1986). "Gramsci's relevance for the study of race and ethnicity". Journal of Communication Inquiry. 10 (2): 5–27. doi:10.1177/019685998601000202. S2CID 53782.
- Hall, Stuart (June 1986). "The problem of ideology-Marxism without guarantees". Journal of Communication Inquiry. 10 (2): 28–44. doi:10.1177/019685998601000203. S2CID 144448154.
- Hall, Stuart; Jacques, Martin (July 1986). "People aid: a new politics sweeps the land". Marxism Today. Amiel and Melburn Collections: 10–14.
- Hall, Stuart (1989). "Ethnicity: Identity and Difference". Radical America 23 (4): 9–20. Available online.

=== 1990s ===
- Hall, Stuart; Held, David; McGrew, Anthony (1992). Modernity and its futures. Cambridge: Polity Press in association with the Open University. ISBN 978-0-7456-0966-9.
- Hall, Stuart (1992), "The question of cultural identity", in Hall, Stuart; Held, David; McGrew, Anthony (eds.), Modernity and its futures, Cambridge: Polity Press in association with the Open University, pp. 274–316, ISBN 978-0-7456-0966-9.
- Hall, Stuart (Summer 1996). "Who dares, fails". Soundings, Issue: Heroes and Heroines. 3. Lawrence and Wishart.
- Hall, Stuart (1997). Representation: cultural representations and signifying practices. London Thousand Oaks, California: Sage in association with the Open University. ISBN 978-0-7619-5432-3.
- Hall, Stuart (1997), "The local and the global: globalization and ethnicity", in McClintock, Anne; Mufti, Aamir; Shohat, Ella (eds.), Dangerous liaisons: gender, nation, and postcolonial perspectives, Minnesota, Minneapolis: University of Minnesota Press, pp. 173–187, ISBN 978-0-8166-2649-6.
- Hall, Stuart (January–February 1997). "Raphael Samuel: 1934-96". New Left Review. I (221). Available online.

=== 2000s ===
- Hall, Stuart (2001), "Foucault: Power, knowledge and discourse", in Wetherell, Margaret; Taylor, Stephanie; Yates, Simeon J. (eds.), Discourse Theory and Practice: a reader, D843 Course: Discourse Analysis, London Thousand Oaks California: SAGE in association with the Open University, pp. 72–80, ISBN 978-0-7619-7156-6.

=== 2010s ===
- Hall, Stuart (2011). "The neo-liberal revolution". Cultural Studies. 25 (6): 705–728. doi:10.1080/09502386.2011.619886. S2CID 143653421.
- Hall, Stuart; Evans, Jessica; Nixon, Sean (2013) [1997]. Representation (2nd ed.). London: Sage in association with The Open University. ISBN 978-1-84920-563-4.
- Hall, Stuart (2016). Cultural Studies 1983: A Theoretical History. Slack, Jennifer, and Lawrence Grossberg (eds), Duke University Press. ISBN 0822362635.
- Hall, Stuart (2017). Selected Political Writings: The Great Moving Right Show and other essays. London: Lawrence & Wishart. ISBN 978-1-910448-65-6.
- Hall, Stuart (with Bill Schwarz) (2017). Familiar Stranger: A Life Between Two Islands. London: Allen Lane; Durham: Duke University Press. ISBN 978-0-8223-6387-3.

=== 2020s ===
- Selected Writings on Marxism (2021), Durham: Duke University Press, ISBN 978-1-4780-0034-1.
- Selected Writings on Race and Difference (2021), Durham: Duke University Press, ISBN 978-1478011668.

== See also ==
- Articulation (sociology)
- Musgrave Medal

Academic offices
Preceded by Michèle Barrett	President of the British Sociological Association; 1995–1997	Succeeded by David Morgan
Awards
Preceded by Alex Nunns	Bread and Roses Award; 2018; With: Reni Eddo-Lodge	Succeeded by Liz Fekete
