= John Goldthorpe =

British sociologist

John Harry Goldthorpe CBE, FBA (born 27 May 1935) is a British sociologist. He is an emeritus Fellow of Nuffield College, Oxford. His main research interests are in the fields of social stratification and mobility, and comparative macro-sociology. He also writes on methodological issues in relation to the integration of empirical, quantitative research and theory with a particular focus on issues of causation.

== Early life ==
Goldthorpe was born in Great Houghton, a remote mining village in the then West Riding of Yorkshire. His father was a colliery clerk and his mother a dressmaker. He was educated at Wath Grammar School, and then took a first class honours degree in history at University College London, being much influenced by the teaching of Alfred Cobban and Gustaaf Renier. Afterwards, he became a graduate student in sociology at the London School of Economics.

== Academic career ==
Goldthorpe was a Junior Research Fellow and Assistant Lecturer in the Department of Sociology at the University of Leicester from 1957 to 1960, working on the structure of a new degree with Ilya Neustadt and Norbert Elias.

In 1960 he was elected to a Prize Fellowship in Sociology at King's College, Cambridge – the first position in sociology to be established in the University. He taught history at King's and from 1962, as University Assistant Lecturer and then Lecturer, sociology courses within the revised Economics Tripos. He formed close relationships with his colleague, David Lockwood, and also with T. H. Marshall who was living in retirement in Cambridge.

In 1969 he was elected to an Official Fellowship at Nuffield College, Oxford, and remained there until his retirement in 2002. He has had many graduate students who have become noted sociologists in Britain and abroad including Tak-Wing Chan, John Child, Colin Crouch, Ricca Edmondson, Geoff Evans, Duncan Gallie, Anne Gauthier, Brendan Halpin, Niamh Hardiman, Anthony Heath, Geoffrey Ingham, Michelle Jackson, Yao-jun Li, Susan MacRae, John McCallum, José-Maria Maravall, Gordon Marshall, Deborah Posel, William Roche, Graeme Salaman, Sawako Shirahase and Meir Yaish.

From 1970 to 1973 Goldthorpe was Editor of Sociology. But from the mid-1970s he became disappointed and disillusioned with the state of sociology in Britain, chiefly because of what he regarded as the undue dominance of socio-political commitments and pseudo-philosophical positions and the disregard of, if not actual hostility towards, new quantitative methods. He left the British Sociological Association and, outside of Oxford, worked mainly with European colleagues, notably Robert Erikson at the Swedish Institute for Social Research, Stockholm University, and Walter Müller at the University of Mannheim. In the late 1980s he acted as consultant on sociological research in the Institute of Philosophy and Sociology of the Polish Academy of Sciences. He played a leading role in the creation of the European Sociological Review and in the formation of the European Consortium for Sociological Research.

He became an Emeritus Fellow of Nuffield in 2002 but continues to be research active.

== Research ==
While at Cambridge, Goldthorpe undertook, together with David Lockwood, Frank Bechhofer and Jennifer Platt, the Affluent Worker studies, which called into question the idea of the embourgeoisement of the British working class.

After arriving at Nuffield, he co-directed the Nuffield Social Mobility study of 1972, which introduced the loglinear modelling of social class mobility tables, leading to the crucial distinction between absolute and relative mobility rates. Several prevailing views about mobility in mid-twentieth century Britain were challenged. During the 1980s he worked with Robert Erikson and Walter Müller on the CASMIN project – a cross-national comparative study of intergenerational class mobility. On the basis of further technical innovations in the analysis of mobility tables, Erikson and Goldthorpe developed the concept of a ‘core model’ of such mobility, which, they suggested, was prevalent, with national-specific variations, across all advanced industrial societies.

In the course of this work the Erikson-Goldthorpe-Portocarero (EGP) class schema was developed and has subsequently been widely used in comparative social research. A specifically British version of the schema was also developed by Goldthorpe and this provided the theoretical basis for the Office for National Statistics' Socio-Economic Classification which, in 2002, was introduced into British official statistics in replacement of the old Registrar-General's Social Classes.

In the 1990s Goldthorpe concentrated mainly on theoretical and methodological issues, in particular on the understanding of social causation and, relatedly, on the application of rational action theory in the explanation of the probabilistic empirical regularities typically established through large-scale social survey research. As an illustration, he produced, together with Richard Breen, a rational action model of class-linked differences in educational choice, which has been widely tested and discussed. He also worked with Robert Erikson and Michelle Jackson on ‘primary’ and ‘secondary’ effects in the creation of educational inequalities and, with these colleagues and in collaboration with David Cox, proposed statistical methods for distinguishing between the two and determining their relative importance.

Subsequently, Goldthorpe joined forces with Tak-Wing Chan in elaborating the Weberian distinction between social class and social status and showing its importance in studies of cultural participation. Their theoretical position and research has led to much controversy with followers of Pierre Bourdieu, who reject the distinction between class and status, but whose work Goldthorpe and Chan regard as being technically weak as regards both data collection and analysis and as failing to produce arguments clear enough to be open to empirical test.

For the last ten years Goldthorpe has returned to research in educational inequalities and social mobility in the context of projects directed by Erzsébet Bukodi. A series of both British and comparative analyses are brought together in their book, Social Mobility and Education in Britain: Research, Politics and Policy. A central theme of the book is the ‘disconnect’ that exists between the findings of sociological research and the discussion of social mobility and education in political and policy circles. In particular, the idea that educational expansion and reform can play a key role in increasing social mobility is questioned, and the hypothesis is advanced that in all societies with a capitalist market economy, a nuclear family system and a liberal-democratic polity, a limit exists to the extent to which relative chances of social mobility can be equalised. Research aimed at elaborating and testing this hypothesis continues.

Goldthorpe has also set out his views on the direction in which he believes that sociology is, appropriately, developing in his book Sociology as a Population Science, and to this he has then added a ‘prequel’, Pioneers of Sociological Science: Statistical Foundations and the Theory of Action.

Goldthorpe is a Fellow of the British Academy, a Foreign Member of the Royal Swedish Academy of Sciences, a Member of the Academia Europaea, an Honorary Fellow of the European Academy of Sociology, and an Honorary Fellow of the Royal Statistical Society.

== Interests ==
Goldthorpe is a serious tennis player, playing semi-professionally as a student.

== Major works ==
- 1968 The Affluent Worker: Industrial Attitudes and Behaviour. Cambridge: Cambridge University Press.
- 1968 The Affluent Worker: Political Attitudes and Behaviour. Cambridge: Cambridge University Press.
- 1969 The Affluent Worker in the Class Structure. Cambridge: Cambridge University Press.
- 1974 The Social Grading of Occupations: A New Approach and Scale. Oxford: Clarendon Press.
- 1980 Social Mobility and Class Structure in Modern Britain. Oxford: Clarendon Press (2nd revised and enlarged edition, 1987).
- 1992 The Constant Flux: A Study of Class Mobility in Industrial Societies. Oxford: Clarendon Press.
- 2000 On Sociology: Numbers, Narratives and the Integration of Research and Theory. Oxford: Oxford University Press.
- 2007 On Sociology (2nd revised and enlarged, 2 volume edition). Stanford: Stanford University Press.
- 2008 From Indifference to Enthusiasm: Patterns of Arts Attendance in England. London: Arts Council England.
- 2016 Sociology as a Population Science. Cambridge: Cambridge University Press.
- 2018 Social Mobility and Education in Britain: Research, Politics and Policy. Cambridge: Cambridge University Press.
- 2021 Pioneers of Sociological Science: Statistical Foundations and the Theory of Action. Cambridge: Cambridge University Press.

Goldthorpe has also published over a hundred articles in sociological and also in economics, political science and statistical journals.
