= Leonore Davidoff =

American historian and sociologist (1932–2014)

- Born: 31 January 1932; New York City, United States
- Died: 19 October 2014 (aged 82)
- Education: Oberlin College; London School of Economics
- Occupations: Feminist historian and sociologist
- Known for: Analysis of the gendered division of roles in public and private spheres
- Notable work: Family Fortunes: Men and Women of the English Middle Class 1780-1850 (with Catherine Hall)
- Spouse: David Lockwood (m. 1954)
- Children: 3

Leonore Davidoff (31 January 1932 – 19 October 2014) was an American-born feminist historian and sociologist who pioneered new approaches to women's history and gender relations, including through her analysis of the gendered division of roles in public and private spheres. She helped create the Feminist Library in London in 1975. She was also the founding editor of the academic journal Gender & History. For much of her academic career, Davidoff was based at the University of Essex in the UK, and was a professor emerita when she died.

== Early life ==
Leonore Davidoff was born in New York City, United States, in 1932, as the second of four children of Ida and Leo M. Davidoff. When she was eight, the family moved to New Canaan. Her upbringing in this white Protestant community in Connecticut served as an "early lesson in marginality". Her father (a Jewish-Latvian immigrant) became a neurosurgeon who started the Albert Einstein College of Medicine, and her mother (born in Boston to Lithuanian immigrants) was an early women's rights supporter and marriage counselor. Her brother and older sister were also doctors.

Davidoff, however, chose to study music as a first degree at Oberlin College, Ohio, later switching to sociology. She went on to do an MA at the London School of Economics (LSE) in 1953. Her master's thesis was on "The Employment of Married Women", and was a foundation to her life's work in the research field of women's history. Still, the thesis remained unpublished; at the time, there was "no Feminist Movement to relate to, and she could not see any future in it."

== Family life ==
It was in her first year at LSE that Davidoff met David Lockwood, then a PhD student in sociology, who would go on to do significant research on the nature of class in Britain. They married in 1954. For a while after the birth of her three sons, from 1956 onwards, Davidoff focused on her family and lost any basis for institutional research. While a lifelong and "remarkable" marriage, Lockwood and she "did not forge an intellectual partnership": he continued to centre his work on issues of class, and did not pay attention to gender as a critical social dimension.

Lockwood had posts in Birmingham and London, and in 1961 was appointed to a lecturer position at the University of Cambridge.

== Cambridge and Essex ==
After a period of isolation in Cambridge, "around the colleges but not in them", Davidoff found friends. They included Jean and Frank Bechhofer, and Esther Newcomb Goody, second wife of Jack Goody. She made connections at Lucy Cavendish College for mature women. When Lockwood moved to the University of Essex in 1968, as a professor in sociology, Davidoff began working there as a research officer. She became a lecturer in social history in 1975 and taught the UK's first MA in women's history. In 1990, she was made a research professor, retiring a few years later.

In the Spring of 1996, Davidoff was a Fellow at the Swedish Collegium for Advanced Study in Uppsala, Sweden as part of the Pro Futura Scientia Program.

David Lockwood died a few months before Davidoff, in June 2014. She was survived by her three sons, Ben, Matthew and Harold, and their families. At her request, her funeral on 3 November 2014 opened with the poem "The Road Not Taken", by Robert Frost.

== Work ==
Davidoff is best known for her book Family Fortunes, written in 1987 with Catherine Hall. The sociologist and oral historian Paul Thompson stated: "[I]t is a brilliant demonstration of the new insights which gender perspectives can yield."

Using case studies of middle-class family and business relationships in urban Birmingham and rural East Anglia, Davidoff and Hall traced the evolution of capitalist enterprise in England at the end of the 18th century. They demonstrated the gendered division of labour through an examination of the family, the economy and religious belief: in particular, the way men operated in the public sphere, and women, in the private, domestic sphere. The authors described Family Fortunes as

... a book about the ideologies, institutions and practices of the English middle class from the end of the eighteenth to the mid nineteenth centuries. [...] The principal argument rests on the assumption that gender and class always operate together, that consciousness of class always takes a gendered form.

== Selected publications ==
- The Best Circles: Society, Etiquette and the Season (1973)
- With Westover, B. Our Work, Our Lives, Our Words: Women’s History and Women’s Work (Totowa, New Jersey: Barnes and Noble Books, 1986)
- With Hall, Catherine. Family Fortunes: Men and Women of the English Middle Class 1780-1850 (Chicago: University of Chicago Press, 1987)
- Worlds Between: Historical Perspectives on Gender & Class (1995)
- With Doolittle, Megan, Janet Fink and Katherine Holden. The Family Story: Blood, Contract and Intimacy (London and New York: Longman, 1999)
- Thicker Than Water: Siblings and Their Relations 1780-1920 (2012)
