= Ralina Joseph =

American academic

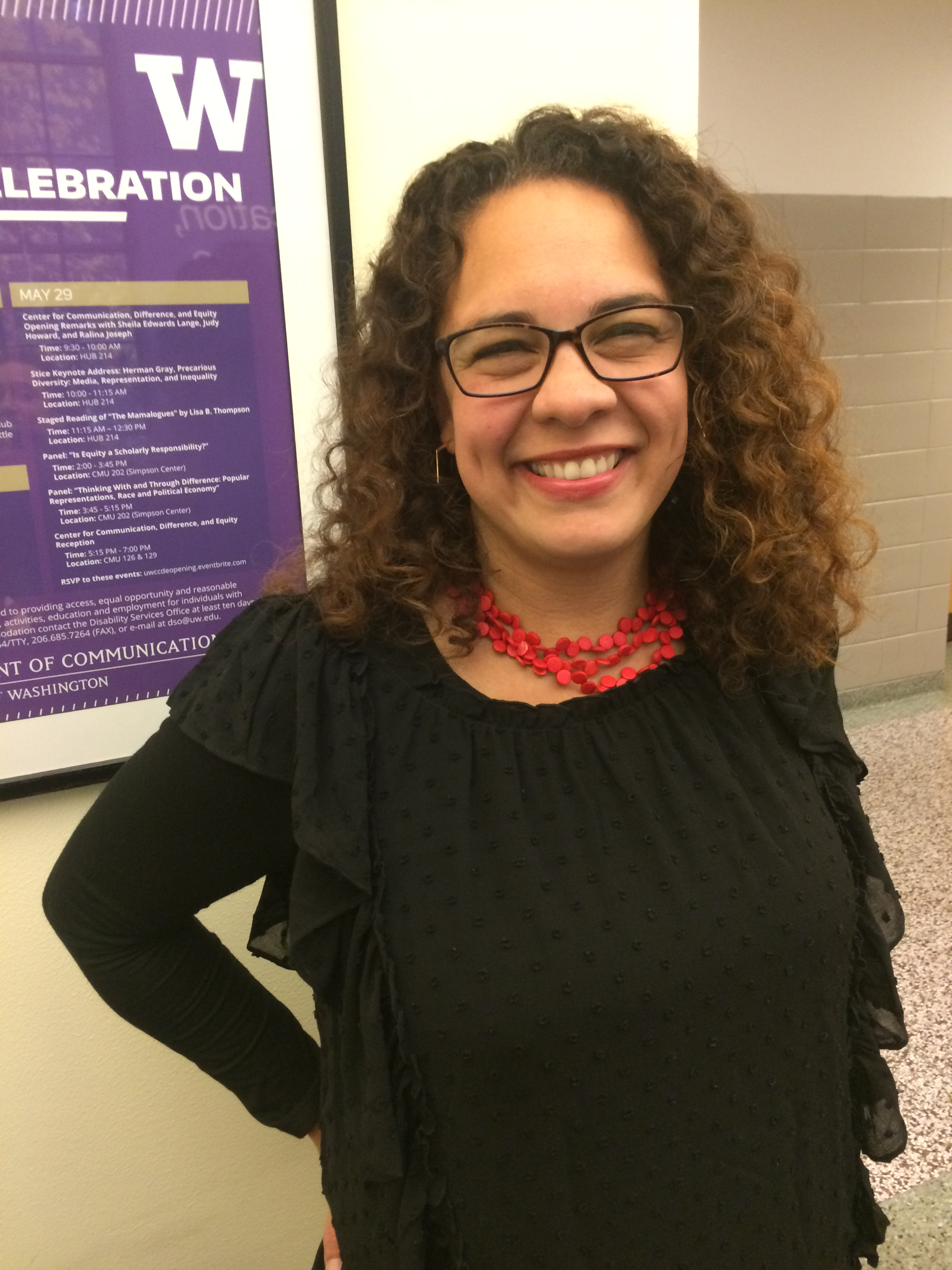

Professor at University of Washington

Associate Dean for Diversity and Student Affairs of the Graduate School at University of Washington

Personal details
- Born: October 27, 1974 (age 51) Washington, D.C., U.S.
- Education: Brown University; University of California, San Diego
- Website: https://www.ralinajoseph.net

Academic background
- Doctoral advisor: Jane Rhodes

Academic work
- Discipline: African-American studies Communication studies
- Institutions: University of Washington

Ralina Joseph (born October 27, 1974) is an American academic. She is a professor in the Department of Communication at the University of Washington, examining representations of race, gender, and sexuality in popular media.

== Education ==
Professor Joseph earned her B.A. in American Civilization from Brown University, and her M.A. and Ph.D. in Ethnic Studies from the University of California, San Diego.

== Career ==
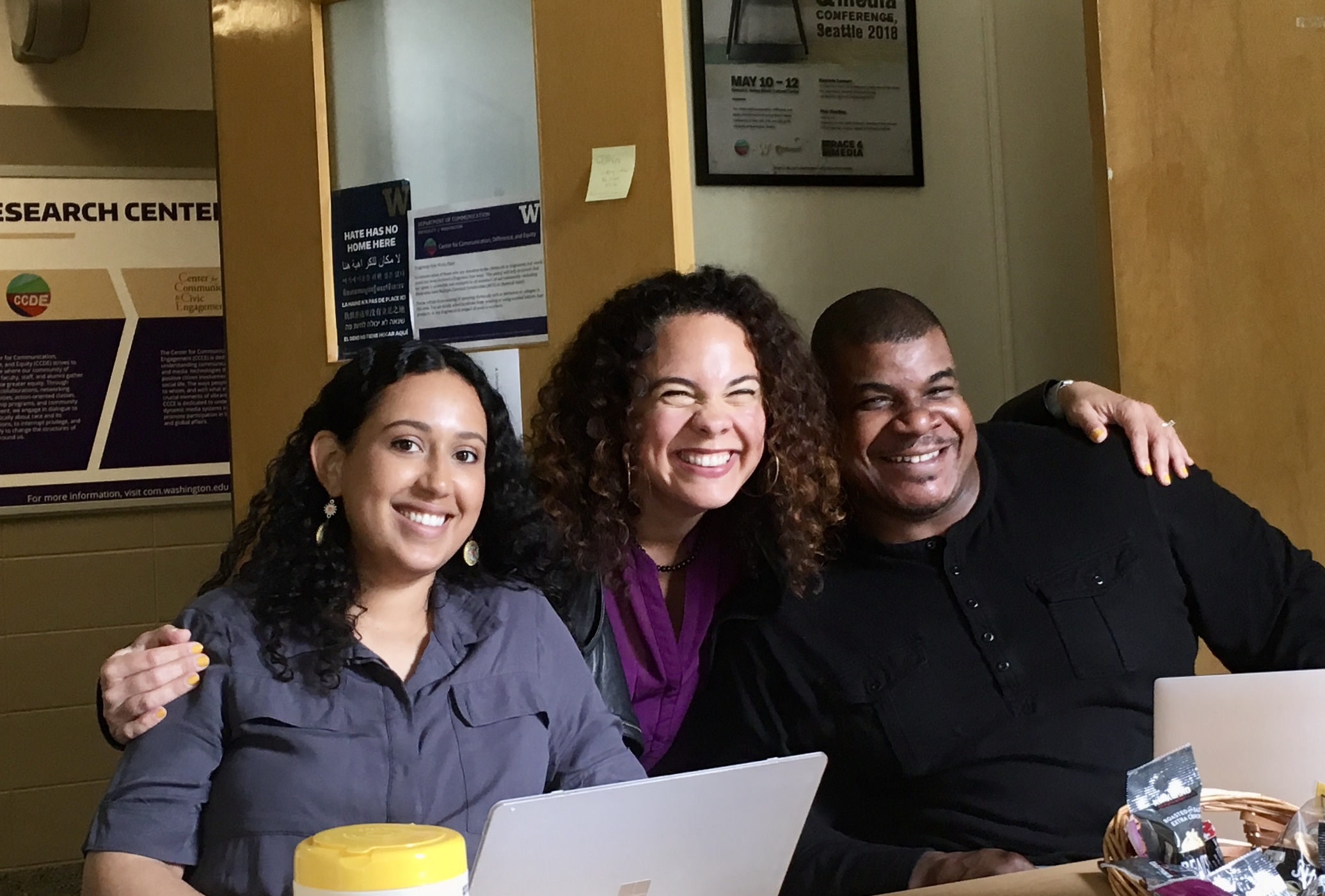
Joseph (center) with two graduate students, Laura Robles-Calderon (left) and Marcus Johnson (right) in the Center for Communication, Difference, and Equity.

Joseph is also an adjunct professor in the Department of Gender, Women, and Sexuality Studies, as well as the Department of American Ethnic Studies. In fall 2020, she was named the associate dean for diversity and student affairs with the graduate school at UW. Additionally, she is the director and co-founder of the Center for Communication, Difference, and Equity (CCDE). For the 2019–2020 academic year, Joseph was a Mellon/ACLS Scholars & Society fellow at the Northwest African American Museum.

== Research ==
Joseph's research looks at communication and difference in representations of race, gender, and sexuality in popular media. With a focus on Black women celebrities such as Jennifer Beals, Tyra Banks, Oprah Winfrey, Shonda Rhimes, Serena Williams, and Michelle Obama, Joseph's work is at the crossroads of communication, cultural studies, cinema and media studies, Black feminism, and American ethnic studies. Dr. Joseph's first book, Transcending Blackness: From the New Millennium Mulatta to the Exceptional Multiracial (2012), was published by Duke University Press. In this book she investigates representations of Black multiracials in the media in the decade that preceded the election of President Barack Obama in 2008. Her 2018 book, Postracial Resistance: Black Women, Media, and the Uses of Strategic Ambiguity, unearths and contemplates the ways that Black women navigate racism and sexism in an ostensibly post-racial, post-gender moment.

Dr. Joseph teaches undergraduate and graduate courses including Communication Power and Difference and Black Cultural Studies, citing scholars such as Stuart Hall, Valerie Smith, Catherine Squires, and Jane Rhodes. She is the creator of Interrupting Privilege, a program that works with the local intergenerational community to talk about difference and learn how to interrupt microaggressions. In 2017, Interrupting Privilege received the CASE (Council for Advancement and Support of Education) Silver Award For Diversity Programs.

== Ideas ==
=== New Millennium Mulatta and Exceptional Multiracial ===
In Transcending Blackness: From the New Millennium Mulatta to the Exceptional Multiracial (2014), Joseph looks at disdain and apprehension in the nation, as well as positive affects and possibilities, of racial representation. Looking at representations of mixed race women, she creates the typology "new millennium mulatta" and "exceptional multiracial" to describe modern day stereotypical appearances of multiracials. She traces the tragic mulatto stereotype to its 21st-century iteration as both the New Millennium Mulatta and the Exceptional Multiracial. The stereotypes strip representations of Black-White mixed women from performing hybridity, or what Joseph calls multiracial Blackness. According to Joseph, the New Millennium Mulatta is full of anger and punished when she speaks of race or when she chooses not to; the Exceptional Multiracial has supposedly transcended race.

=== Strategic Ambiguity ===
In Postracial Resistance: Black Women, The Media, and the Uses of Strategic Ambiguity (2018), Joseph writes about the "linguistic acrobatic act" that some Black women, like Kerry Washington, practice to negotiate their seemingly post-racial society. Strategic Ambiguity can be used as an offensive or defensive tactic but is not always the safe choice. Born out of Black respectability politics, strategic ambiguity is not about explicitly recognizing racism and sexism but instead, only speaking back to systems of power in coded ways. As a postracial performance, strategic ambiguity is a method of survival.

=== Racialized difference ===
Expanding on the work of communication and cultural studies scholar Stuart Hall, Joseph introduces the notion of "equity" as inseparable from "difference". She understands these concepts through publicly engaged praxis, where theory and public engagement exist in a dialectical relationship. This praxis is mirrored by her inception and direction of the (CCDE), which was launched in 2015. The research center has two main tenets of its scholarship: 1. humans negotiate difference through communication, 2. empowered systems, like the university, have a responsibility to wield the power it holds by advocating for equity.

In her recent article, What's the Difference With 'Difference'? Equity, Communication, and the Politics of Difference, Joseph places emphasis on the centrality of communication. Difference is an umbrella term used to indicate identity vectors such as race, gender, class, sexuality, and disability. She writes that we do not focus enough on the role that language plays in our racialized reality. In her words, we do not talk enough about language and inequality. Her leadership and involvement with the CCDE exhibits this commitment to theorizing communication and difference through the close study of language and terms. And also by the mobilization of over 50 affiliated faculty from different departments including "Education, History, American Ethnic Studies, English, Sociology, Social Work, and Gender, Women, and Sexuality Studies, and the School of Interdisciplinary Arts and Sciences at the University of Washington Bothell" as well as university and community resources. She has created a physical space meant to support those who face inequity in the institution.

The theory of difference that Dr. Joseph expands upon can be traced back to Ferdinand de Saussure who wrote that meaning comes from comparison and not inherent denotation of a named object. According to Joseph's interpretation, meaning can only be obtained or signified by comparing one thing to the other, and because we understand things as being the signifier of what they are not, then this relation can be understood in a term of endless distinction, or difference. Jacques Derrida extended this notion of difference by defining it as "oppositional." Joseph then explains how Derrida saw this opposition as relational and about power. Derrida's read of oppositional differences can be understood by evoking the mathematical term of difference or subtraction, as equating to less than. Derrida's différance is unlike Saussure's in that it has two meanings, that of "differ and to defer." The first is a term of distinction, the second is a term of delay. As Joseph explains, the first meaning is about the "process of relational change" that is constantly updated. The second meaning is about temporality, "postponed for some later, never to be determined moment." Ralina Joseph uses this paradigm of the term to reflect on other terms of racialized difference including "post-racial" and "feminism". She links the theory of difference with the practice of equity in declaring, "difference" as a word that reflects relations. Pairing difference and equity opens up opportunities for eradicating inequity and disproportionality. Joseph believes that change in the world begins with change in classrooms, scholarship, and educational institutions.

== Select works ==
=== Journal articles ===
- Joseph, Ralina L. (2009). ""Tyra Banks is Fat": Reading (Post-)Racism and (Post-)Feminism in the New Millennium". Critical Studies in Media Communication. 26 (3): 237–254. doi:10.1080/15295030903015096. S2CID 144728237.
- Joseph, Ralina L. (2011). "Imagining Obama: Reading Overtly and Inferentially Racist Images of our 44th President, 2007–2008". Communication Studies. 62 (4): 389–405. doi:10.1080/10510974.2011.588074. S2CID 42526412.
- Joseph, Ralina L. (2011). ""Hope is Finally Making a Comeback": First Lady Reframed". Communication, Culture & Critique. 4: 56–77. doi:10.1111/j.1753-9137.2010.01093.x.
- Joseph, Ralina L. (2016). "Strategically Ambiguous Shonda Rhimes: Respectability Politics of a Black Woman Showrunner". Souls. 18 (2–4): 302–320. doi:10.1080/10999949.2016.1230825. S2CID 151410081.

=== Books ===
- Joseph, Ralina L. (2013). Transcending Blackness: From the New Millennium Mulatta to the Exceptional Multiracial. Durham, NC: Duke University Press. ISBN 9780822352921.
- Joseph, Ralina L. (2018). Postracial Resistance: Black Women, Media, and the Uses of Strategic Ambiguity. New York, NY: NYU Press. ISBN 9781479840366.

== Awards and honors ==
- The GO-MAP Faculty Leadership Award from the University of Washington (2013)
- Undergraduate Research Mentor Award from the University of Washington (2017)
- The Sapphire Distinguished Faculty Award from the Samuel E. Kelly Ethnic Cultural Center (2017)
- The Woman of Courage Award from the University of Washington Women's Center (2017)
- Presidential Term Professorship (Endowed Professorship) (2018)
- University of Washington Alumni Association Distinguished Service Award (2018)

== See also ==
- List of University of Washington People
