= History Workshop Journal =

- Discipline: Historiography
- Language: English
- Edited by: Marybeth Hamilton

Publication details
- Former name: History Workshop
- History: 1976–present
- Publisher: Oxford University Press (United Kingdom)
- Frequency: Biannual
- Impact factor: 0.528 (2018)

Standard abbreviations
- ISO 4: Hist. Workshop J.

Indexing
- CODEN: HWOJFT
- ISSN: 1363-3554 (print); 1477-4569 (web)
- LCCN: 96649697
- OCLC no.: 50234546

Links
- Journal homepage; Online archive

The History Workshop Journal is a British academic history journal published by Oxford University Press. History Workshop was founded in 1976 by Raphael Samuel and others involved in the History Workshop movement. Originally sub-titled "A Journal of Socialist Historians", it later changed the sub-title to "A Journal of Socialist and Feminist Historians" before dropping the sub-title in 1994.

The Journal "publishes a wide variety of essays, reports and reviews, ranging from literary to economic subjects, local history to geopolitical analyses." According to the Times Higher Education website, History Workshop Journal is ranked number 9 in the top 20 history journals worldwide, ranked by their five-year impact factors, as of 2011. This information was presented in Thomson Reuters' Journal Citation Reports for the social sciences for 2009.

== The History Workshop movement ==
The main aim of the History Workshop movement was to promote the historiographical tradition known variously as history from below, social history, the history of everyday life, or simply people's history. Bill Schwarz wrote that the "History Workshop functioned in Britain as an effective alternative historical apparatus. It countered the intellectual and political conservatism of the dominant historical profession, setting up an alternative means for producing historical knowledge which had roots deep in the subordinate groups of British society". Samuel defined the movement as being "the belief that history is or ought to be a collaborative enterprise, one in which the researcher, the archivist, the curator and the teacher, the 'do-it-yourself' enthusiast and the local historian, the family history societies and the individual archaeologist, should all be regarded as equally engaged."

During the 1970s and early 1980s, the History Workshop movement grew in popularity, which saw the foundation of a number of local History Workshops and a series of pamphlets, books and journals, including the History Workshop Journal. The British movement also inspired several international History Workshops in Europe, South Africa and America.

== History Workshop Online ==
An associated website, the History Workshop Online, was launched by the editorial collective of the History Workshop Journal in 2011. This moderated website publishes shorter and more contemporary-focused articles than appear in History Workshop Journal, as well as editorials, debates, news and events, and a series of articles on "Radical Objects". These "Radical Objects" are tangible objects, such as badges or pamphlets, with direct relationships to events or themes in radical history. In October 2012, the History Workshop Online, in collaboration with the Bishopsgate Institute, launched an online archive of material from the History Workshop Movement, which includes background information about each History Workshop and associated events from the 1960s to the 1990s. The material available on the History Workshop archive also includes scans of images, tickets and pamphlets and audio recordings from the History Workshops themselves.

== See also ==
- Historiography of the United Kingdom
