= David Lockwood (sociologist) =

British sociologist (1929–2014)

David Lockwood CBE FBA MAE
- Born: 9 April 1929; Holmfirth, England
- Died: 6 June 2014 (aged 85)
- Spouse: Leonore Davidoff (m. 1954)

Academic background
- Education: London School of Economics
- Influences: T. H. Marshall; Max Weber

Academic work
- Discipline: Sociology
- Sub-discipline: Social stratification; sociological theory
- Institutions: University of Cambridge; University of Essex
- Notable students: Anthony Giddens

David Lockwood CBE FBA MAE (9 April 1929 – 6 June 2014) was a British sociologist.

== Early life ==
Lockwood was born on 9 April 1929 in Holmfirth, England, and was the youngest child in his working-class family. His father, Herbert, was a dyer and then retrained as a cobbler after being wounded during the First World War and he died in 1939, when Lockwood was 10. His mother, Edith, was a cleaner.

Lockwood attended Honley Grammar School, and then went to work in 1944 at Victoria Textiles as a bookkeeper. He took evening classes at Huddersfield Technical College. He served in the Army Intelligence Corps from 1947 to 1949.

== Academia ==
While Lockwood was in the army, serving in Austria, he became interested in Karl Marx through a contact in the Royal Army Educational Corps, and was encouraged to study at university. Still in Austria, he gained a place by examination at the London School of Economics. His contemporary there A. H. Halsey later wrote that Lockwood was outstanding as a sociologist, in a group that included also Basil Bernstein, Ralf Dahrendorf and Ronald Dore. Graduating in 1952 with a first class degree, Lockwood was awarded a one-year studentship, during which he studied industrial disputes and arbitration. Through T. H. Marshall, he then gained an assistant lectureship. Having published books and papers, he became in 1960 a lecturer in the Economics Department of the University of Cambridge, and Fellow of St John's College, Cambridge.

In 1968 Lockwood became a Professor at the University of Essex.

== Works ==
Lockwood's book The Blackcoated Worker (1958 & 1989) analysed the changes in the stratification position of the clerical worker. It used a framework based on Max Weber's distinction between market and work situations. He argued that the class position of an occupation can best be located by distinguishing between the material rewards gained from the market and work situations, and the symbolic rewards deriving from its status situation. His work contributed to the "proletarianisation" debate, around the contention that white-collar workers were beginning to identify with manual workers by identifying their work situation as having much in common with the proletariat.

Other published work included The Affluent Worker in the Class Structure (3 vols. 1968–9), with 1968–9, with Frank Bechhofer, John Goldthorpe and Jennifer Platt; and Solidarity and Schism (1992).

== Family life ==
Lockwood was married to the gender studies pioneer Leonore Davidoff, whom he met while studying at LSE. They had three sons: Matthew, Ben, and Harold.

Lockwood died on 6 June 2014.

== See also ==
- Macrosociology
