= Michael Anderson (historian) =

British historian

Michael Anderson, OBE, FRSE, FBA (born 21 February 1942) is an economic historian and retired academic. He was Professor of Economic History at the University of Edinburgh between 1979 and 2007.

== Career ==
Born in 1942, Anderson attended Kingston Grammar School and Queens' College, Cambridge, graduating in 1964 and then completing a PhD five years later. He joined the University of Edinburgh in 1967 as an assistant lecturer and was promoted to a full lectureship in 1969 and a readership in sociology in 1975. He was appointed Professor of Economic History in 1979, retiring in 2007. He also served as Dean of the Faculty of Social Sciences and Languages from 1985 to 1989, Vice-Principal from 1989 to 1990, and Senior Vice-Principal from 2000 to 2007. Outside of academia, he was chairman of the Board of Trustees of the National Library of Scotland from 2000 to 2012.

=== Honours and awards ===
Anderson was elected a Fellow of the British Academy (the United Kingdom's national academy for the humanities and social sciences) in 1989, and served on its council from 1995 to 1998. In 1990, he was also elected a Fellow of the Royal Society of Edinburgh. He has received honorary doctorates from the University of Edinburgh (2007) and the University of Leicester (2014), and was appointed an Officer of the Order of the British Empire in the 1999 Birthday Honours "for services to educationalism".

== Publications ==
- Family Structure in Nineteenth Century Lancashire, Cambridge Studies in Sociology (Cambridge University Press, 1971).
- (Editor) Sociology of the Family: Selected Readings (Penguin, 1971).
- Approaches to the History of the Western Family 1500–1914, New Studies in Economic and Social History (Macmillan for the Economic History Society, 1981).
- The 1851 Census: A National Sample of the Enumerators Returns (Chadwyck-Healey, 1987).
- Population Change in Northwestern Europe 1750–1850 (Macmillan, 1988).
- (Edited with Frank Bechhofer and Jonathan Gershuny) The Social and Political Economy of the Household (Oxford University Press, 1995).
- (Editor) British Population History: From the Black Death to the Present Day (Cambridge University Press, 1996).
- Scotland’s Populations from the 1850s to Today (Oxford University Press, 2018).
