= Embourgeoisement =

Elevation of individuals into the bourgeoisie

Embourgeoisement is the process by which the values, ideas and lifestyles of the bourgeoisie or middle class are adopted by non-bourgeois groups, primarily the working class and the rural population. The opposite process is proletarianization. Sociologist John Goldthorpe disputed the embourgeoisement thesis in 1967.

A suggested example resulting from their own efforts or collective action is that taken by unions in the United States and elsewhere in the 1930s to the 1960s that established middle class-status for factory workers and others that would not have been considered middle class by their employments. This process allowed increasing numbers of what might traditionally be classified as working-class people to assume the lifestyle and individualistic values of the so-called middle classes and hence reject commitment to collective social and economic goals.

== History ==
Although Karl Marx foresaw a polarization between those who had control over the factors of production and those who did not, with the disappearance of all intermediate classes, already he and Friedrich Engels noted that the British workers were becoming bourgeois.

In particular, the period of long prosperity after the Second World War and the construction of the welfare state brought a growth in prosperity for the working class. Fordism, with its rise in wages, had made workers into consumers. With the advancing mechanization and automation, more and more manual labor disappeared. As a result, the work began to resemble that of the middle class. In addition, the working-class neighborhoods began to fall apart and workers and the middle class increasingly lived together. This also meant that mutual solidarity decreased and individualization set in, reinforced by the new mass media and culture.

Nevertheless, the theory of the embourgeoisement of the working class turned out not to be entirely correct and there remained a difference in, among other things, lifestyle, social participation and political ideology. Pierre Bourdieu deduced from this that the class structure continually reproduces itself. In a meritocratic society, intelligence and education should determine one's place in society, but in reality it remains difficult to climb the social ladder. This social reproduction is linked not only to economic capital such as money and real estate, but also to cultural capital (knowledge, skills, education) and social capital (relationships, networks). The individualisation thesis and the reproduction thesis are the two extremes and although both contain useful elements, research shows a more nuanced picture.

== Background ==
Charles E. Hurst describes this change to be a result of the post-industrialization of society, in which there are far fewer manual labor jobs, which is the main classification of blue-collar work. With post-industrialization, former upper-level blue-collar workers are moving to white-collar work because of the decreased availability and prestige of manual labor jobs. Even when their actual jobs do not change, their lifestyles based on their job situation often change into a lifestyle that according to Mayer and Buckley, more closely resembles the lower-middle class than the rest of the lower blue-collar workers. The result of this idea of embourgeoisement is that more people are incorporated into the middle-class. As a result, there is decreased class consciousness and declining working class solidarity. This in turn could lead to less group action among the lower class if trying to get more rights or changes within their job field. The topic was widely discussed in academic circles in the 1960s following the publication of The Affluent Worker in the Class Structure ISBN 0-521-09533-6 by John H. Goldthorpe in 1963.

The situation in Great Britain at the time is described in the book Must Labour Lose?, written by Mark Abrams and Richard Rose.

== See also ==
- Classless society
- Class consciousness
- False consciousness
- Proletarianization
