= Feminist Library =

London archive of feminist literature and activism

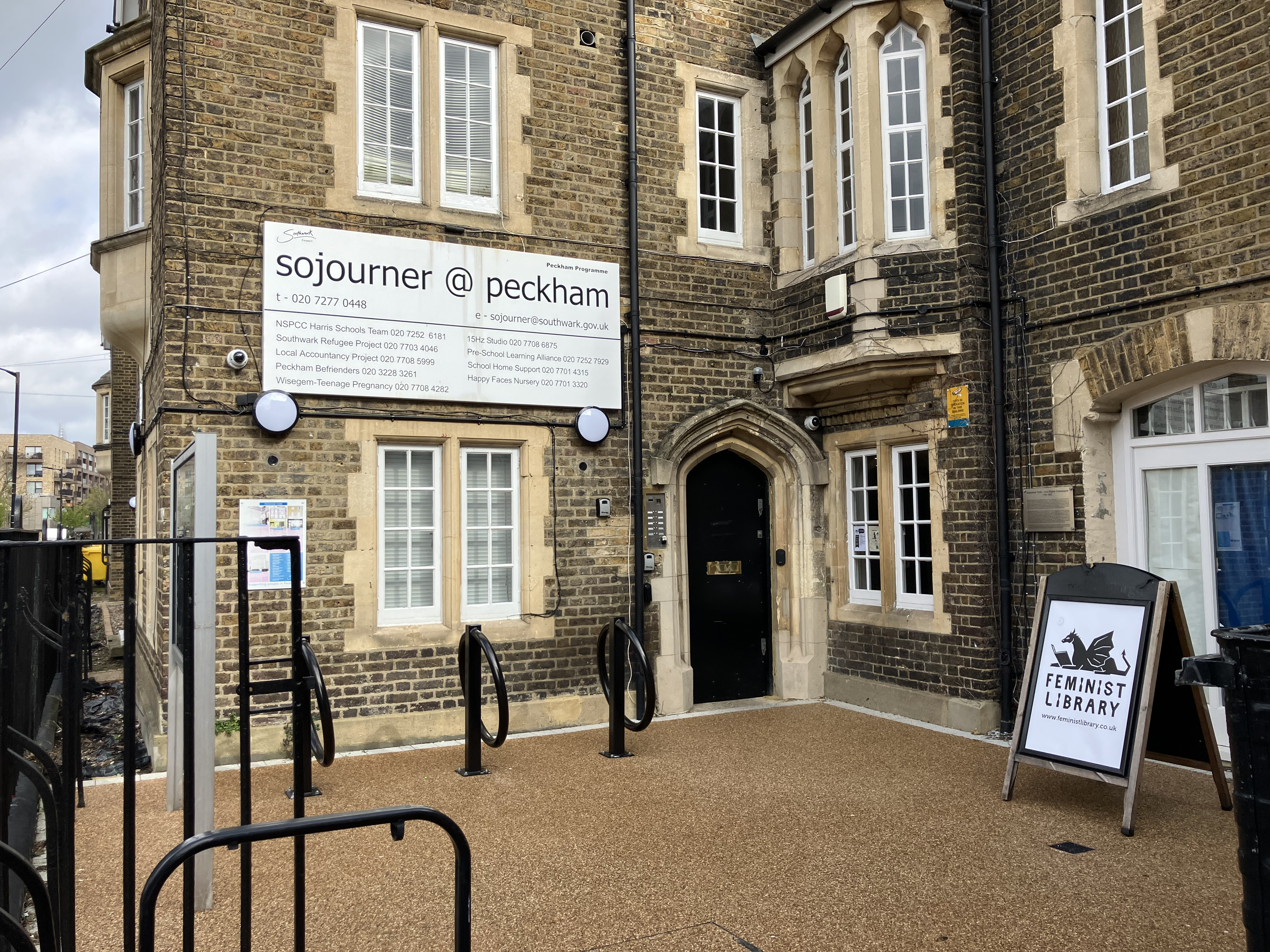
- 51.477839°N 0.073382°W
- Location: London, England
- Type: Special library
- Established: 1975; 51 years ago

Collection
- Items collected: Books, Periodicals, Pamphlets
- Size: Approx. 14,700

Other information
- Website: Feminist Library

The Feminist Library is a special collection and archive of materials related to feminist literature and activism in London and the wider UK, including books, poetry pamphlets, and periodicals. Since 2020, the library is located in the Sojourner Truth Community Centre, Peckham, Southwark, South London.

== History ==
=== Women's Research and Resources Centre ===
The library was founded as the Women's Research and Resources Centre in 1975 by a group of women, concerned about the future of the Fawcett Library, to ensure that the history of the women's liberation movement survived. The founders included feminist academics Diana Leonard and Leonore Davidoff.

In Autumn 1989 the library moved to a new venue at 5 Westminster Bridge Road, London SE1.

=== 2003 crisis ===
The library faced a financial crisis in 2003 when Lambeth Council substantially increased the rent on the building.

Four years later, in 2007, the management committee called an emergency meeting as a final attempt to gather support. The meeting was well attended and the library was saved, although as of 2025 it still struggles, depending on grants to survive.

=== Librarians for Tomorrow ===
In January 2010, the library announced that it had received a grant from Awards for All, which it intended to use to train volunteers in radical librarianship, using the library itself as a resource. In March 2010, fifteen volunteers were chosen from many applicants and they began working at the library in April 2010. One of the trainees began writing an anonymous blog about her experiences.

Opening hours had increased from 2013 to 2014 but remained dependent on the availability of volunteers. In 2015, the library celebrated its 40th anniversary. By 2018, it was open afternoons or evenings from Tuesday to Saturday.

=== Sojourner Truth Resource Centre, 2020–present ===
The Feminist Library re-opened in Peckham at the Sojourner Truth Resource Centre, 161 Sumner Rd, London SE15 6JL in late January 2020, closing again in March 2020 due to the COVID-19 pandemic and reopening in May 2021.

== Collection ==
The library started as a small collection of contemporary material, but is now considered to be the most significant library of feminist material in England. As of 2010, the collection included some 7,500 books, of which around 5,000 are non-fiction, 500 poetry publications, and 1,500 periodical titles, many self-published, taking about 85 metres of shelving. There is also a large number of pamphlets, held at the Bishopsgate Institute.

=== Poetry and fiction ===
The amount of poetry and fiction in the library is unusual for a special collection focused on a political movement. The reason for this is that the library wanted to ensure individual women were represented as part of their liberation, as explained by Gail Chester, a member of the library's management committee, in an interview with Anne Welsh in 2007.

== See also ==
- Women's Library
- Leonore Davidoff
- East End Women's Museum
