= Cultural hegemony =

Marxist theory of cultural dominance

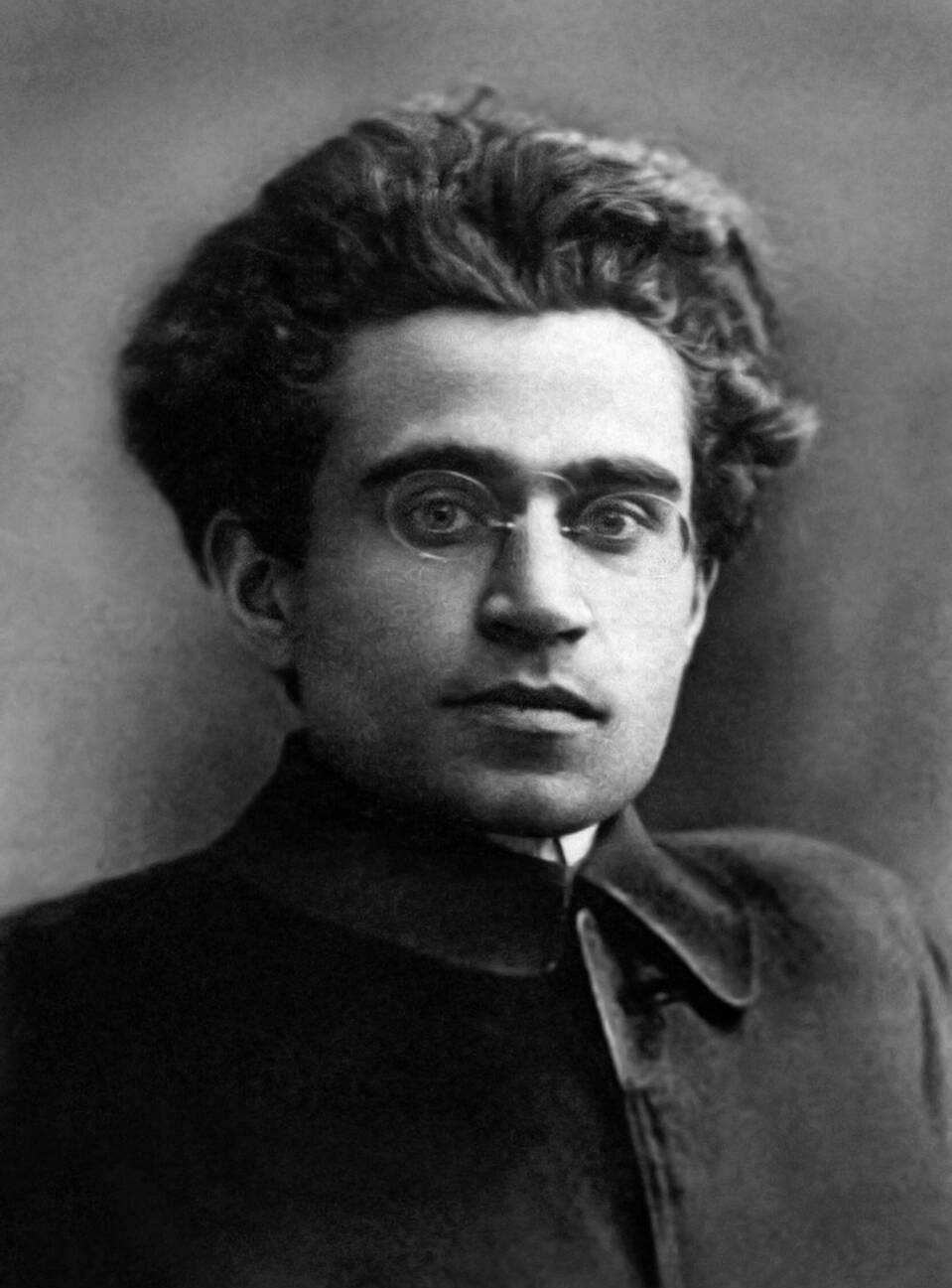
The Marxist intellectual Antonio Gramsci (1891–1937) developed the theory of cultural hegemony to explain the social-control structures of society, arguing that the working-class intelligentsia must generate a working-class ideology to counter the worldview (cultural hegemony) of the ruling class.

In Marxist philosophy, cultural hegemony is the dominance over a culturally diverse society by the ruling class who shape the culture of that society—the beliefs and explanations, perceptions, values, and mores—so that the worldview of the ruling class becomes the accepted cultural norm. As the universal dominant ideology, the ruling-class worldview misrepresents the social, political, and economic status quo as natural and inevitable, and as perpetuating social conditions that benefit every social class, rather than as a set of artificial social constructs that benefit only the ruling class. When the social control is carried out by another society, it is known as cultural imperialism.

In philosophy and in sociology, the denotations and the connotations of term cultural hegemony derive from the Ancient Greek word hegemonia (ἡγεμονία), which indicates the leadership and the régime of the hegemon. In political science, hegemony is the geopolitical dominance exercised by an empire, the hegemon (leader state) that rules the subordinate states of the empire by the threat of intervention, an implied means of power, rather than by threat of direct rule—military invasion, occupation, and territorial annexation.

== Background ==
=== Historical ===
In 1848, Karl Marx proposed that the economic recessions and practical contradictions of a capitalist economy would provoke the working class to proletarian revolution, depose capitalism, restructure social institutions (economic, political, social) per the rational models of socialism, and thus begin the transition to a communist society. Therefore, the dialectical changes to the functioning of the economy of a society determine its social superstructures (culture and politics).

In Problems of Everyday Life, Leon Trotsky argued that capitalism's long establishment in Western Europe caused the proletariat there to become more acculturated to bourgeois habits and reformist traditions, binding them more closely to the existing system. Consequently, this in turn made the revolutionary process in those respective countries more difficult. Nevertheless, Trotsky argued that due to the cultural and economic advantages that Western Europe had accumulated over centuries that this in turn would make the potentiality of socialist construction more achievable.

To that end, Antonio Gramsci proposed a strategic distinction between the politics for a war of position and for a war of manœuvre. The war of position is an intellectual and cultural struggle wherein the anti-capitalist revolutionary creates a proletarian culture whose native value system counters the cultural hegemony of the bourgeoisie. The proletarian culture will increase class consciousness, teach revolutionary theory and historical analysis, and thus further develop revolutionary organisation among the social classes. After winning the war of position, socialist leaders would then have the necessary political power and popular support to realise the war of manœuvre, the political praxis of revolutionary socialism.

=== Political economy ===
Marxist philosophy holds that a society's dominant ideology reflects the interests, values, and beliefs of the ruling class. According to Gramsci, the ruling class achieves its ideological dominance through socializing the people with its beliefs, values, and mores through institutions including churches, media, courts, and schools. The ruling class establishes cultural hegemony when its ideology becomes the accepted and dominant ideology, obtaining "the consent of subordinate groups to the existing social order" so that the ruling class does not need to rely exclusively on coercion. Gramsci brought this understanding of cultural hegemony to prominence through his Prison Notebooks.

Under imperialism, cultural hegemony arises when the working and peasant classes accept the prevailing cultural norms of a society (the dominant ideology imposed by the ruling class) as an accurate depiction of the natural social order.

In the war for position, the working-class intelligentsia politically educate the working classes to perceive that the prevailing cultural norms are not natural and inevitable social conditions, and to recognize that the social constructs of bourgeois culture function as instruments of socio-economic domination, e.g. the institutions (state, church, and social strata), the conventions (custom and tradition), and beliefs (religions and ideologies), etc. That to realise their own working-class culture the workers and the peasants, by way of their own intellectuals, must perform the necessary analyses of their culture and national history in order for the proletariat to transcend the old ways of thinking about the order of things in a society under the cultural hegemony of an imperial power.

=== Social domination ===
Gramsci said that cultural and historical analyses of the "natural order of things in society" established by the dominant ideology, would allow common-sense men and women to intellectually perceive the social structures of bourgeois cultural hegemony. In each sphere of life (private and public) common sense is the intellectualism with which people cope with and explain their daily life within their social stratum within the greater social order; yet the limits of common sense inhibit a person's intellectual perception of the exploitation of labour made possible with cultural hegemony. Given the difficulty in perceiving the status quo hierarchy of bourgeois culture (social and economic classes), most people concern themselves with private matters, and so do not question the fundamental sources of their socio-economic oppression, individual and collective.

== Intelligentsia ==
To perceive and combat ruling-class cultural hegemony, the working class and the peasant class depend upon the moral and political leadership of their native intelligentsia, scholars, academics, and teachers, scientists, philosophers, administrators et al. from their specific social classes; thus Gramsci's political distinction between the intellectuals of the bourgeoisie and the intellectuals of the working class, respectively, the men and women who are the proponents and the opponents of the cultural status quo:

Since these various categories of traditional intellectuals experience through an esprit de corps their uninterrupted historical continuity, and their special qualifications, they thus put themselves forward as autonomous and independent of the dominant social group. This self-assessment is not without consequences in the ideological and political fields; consequences of wide-ranging import. The whole of idealist philosophy can easily be connected with this position, assumed by the social complex of intellectuals, and can be defined as the expression of that social utopia, by which the intellectuals think of themselves as "independent" [and] autonomous, [and] endowed with a character of their own, etc.

— Selections from the Prison Notebooks of Antonio Gramsci (1971), pp. 7–8.

The traditional and vulgarized type of the intellectual is given by the Man of Letters, the philosopher, and the artist. Therefore, journalists, who claim to be men of letters, philosophers, artists, also regard themselves as the "true" intellectuals. In the modern world, technical education, closely bound to industrial labour, even at the most primitive and unqualified level, must form the basis of the new type of intellectual. . . . The mode of being of the new intellectual can no longer consist of eloquence, which is an exterior and momentary mover of feelings and passions, but in active participation in practical life, as constructor [and] organizer, as "permanent persuader", not just simple orator.

— Selections from the Prison Notebooks of Antonio Gramsci (1971), pp. 9–10.

== After Gramsci ==
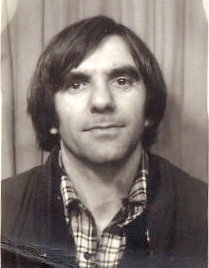
In 1968, Rudi Dutschke, a leader of the German student movement, the "68er-Bewegung", said that changing the bourgeois society of West Germany required a long march through the society's institutions, in order to identify and combat cultural hegemony.

=== German student movement ===
In 1967, regarding the politics and society of West Germany, the leader of the German Student Movement, Rudi Dutschke, applied Gramsci's analyses of cultural hegemony using the phrase the "Long March through the Institutions" to describe the ideological work necessary to realise the war of position. The allusion to the Long March (1934–35) of the Chinese People's Liberation Army reflects the immense effort the working-class intelligentsia must undertake to create its own popular culture, displacing the dominant ideology imposed by the cultural hegemony of the bourgeoisie.

=== State apparatuses of ideology ===
In Ideology and Ideological State Apparatuses (1970), Louis Althusser describes the complex of social relationships among the different organs of the State that transmit and disseminate the dominant ideology to the populations of a society. The ideological state apparatuses (ISA) are the sites of ideological conflict among the social classes of a society; and, unlike the military and police forces, the repressive state apparatuses (RSA), the ISA exist as a plurality throughout society.

Despite the ruling-class control of the RSA, the ideological apparatuses of the state are both the sites and the stakes (the objects) of class struggle, because the ISA are not monolithic social entities, and exist amongst society. As public and private sites of continual class struggle, the ISA constitute overdetermined zones of society formed from elements of the dominant ideologies of previous modes of production, generating continual political activity in:

- the religious ISA (the clergy)
- the educational ISA (the public and private school systems)
- the family ISA (patriarchal family)
- the legal ISA (police and legal, court and penal systems)
- the political ISA (political parties)
- the company union ISA
- the mass communications ISA (print, radio, television, internet, cinema)
- the cultural ISA (literature, the arts, sport, etc.)

The parliamentary structures of the State, by which elected politicians exercise the will of the people also are an ideological apparatus of the State, given the State's control of which populations are allowed to participate as political parties. In itself, the political system is an ideological apparatus, because citizens' participation involves intellectually accepting the ideological "fiction, corresponding to a 'certain' reality, that the component parts of the [political] system, as well as the principle of its functioning, are based on the ideology of the 'freedom' and 'equality' of the individual voters and the 'free choice' of the people's representatives, by the individuals that 'make up' the people".

== See also ==
- Behavioral contagion – Spontaneous, unsolicited and uncritical imitation of another's behavior
- Collective action problem – Type of social dilemma
- Conjunctural analysis
- Cultural capital – Concept of social status and social mobility
- Cultural conflict – Clash of beliefs or values
- Domination and the Arts of Resistance: Hidden Transcripts (1990), by James C. Scott
- Focal point (game theory) – Concept in game theory
- Hegemonic masculinity – Concept in gender studies
- Hegemony and Socialist Strategy (1985), by Ernesto Laclau and Chantal Mouffe
- Herd behavior – Behavior of groups without centralized direction
- "Ideology and Ideological State Apparatuses" (1970), by Louis Althusser
- Marxist cultural analysis – Anti-capitalist cultural critique
- Marx's theory of alienation – Social theory developed by Karl Marx
- Nicos Poulantzas – Greek-French Marxist sociologist (1936–1979)
- Organic crisis – Scenario of complete instability of a system
- Passive revolution – Years-long change in political order, in Gramscian discourse
- Political consciousness – Psychological political theory
- Posthegemony – Concept in political philosophy
- Sheeple
- Social capital – Networks of relationships among people who live and work in a particular society
- Soft power – Ability to co-opt rather than coerce
- Southern strategy – 20th-century Republican electoral strategy for the Southern US
- Subaltern (postcolonialism) – Concept from critical theory and post-colonial studies
- The Structural Transformation of the Public Sphere: An Inquiry into a Category of Bourgeois Society (1962), by Jürgen Habermas
