= Digital scholarship =

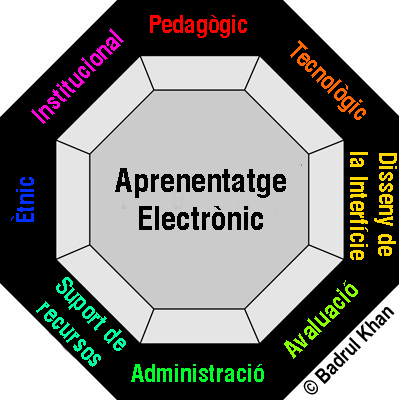
A digital learning environment

Digital scholarship is the use of digital evidence, methods of inquiry, research, publication and preservation to achieve scholarly and research goals. Digital scholarship can encompass both scholarly communication using digital media and research on digital media. An important aspect of digital scholarship is the effort to establish digital media and social media as credible, professional and legitimate means of research and communication. Digital scholarship has a close association with digital humanities, often serving as the umbrella term for discipline-agnostic digital research methods.

Digital scholarship may also include born-digital means of scholarly communication that are more traditional, like online journals and databases, e-mail correspondence and the digital or digitized collections of research and academic libraries. Since digital scholarship is often concerned with the production and distribution of digital media, discussions about copyright, fair use and digital rights management (DRM) frequently accompany academic analysis of the topic. Combined with open access, digital scholarship is offered as a more affordable and open model for scholarly communication.

== Development of the concept ==
The concept of digital scholarship emerged early in the 21st century. Digital scholarship is "discipline-based scholarship produced with digital tools and presented in digital form". It is a research agenda concerned with the impact of Internet and digital technologies that are transforming scholarly practices. These include social and technological factors.

In the 2010s, research primarily took two approaches to the subject. The first was the impact of digital infrastructures (such as the Internet and academic libraries) on scholarship, which Christine L. Borgman researches. The second was the impact of digital scholarship on the institutions and organization of academia.

According to Ernest L. Boyer in Scholarship Reconsidered, discovery, integration, application, and teaching are the four main aspects of scholarship. The growth of digital media allows the main areas of scholarship to each benefit from expansions due to the infinite sharing potential of digital content.

In education, the main areas of relevance are science, technology, engineering, and math. The emergence of digital scholarship and digital media allows for another means for students to become engaged. Key areas of academia that digital media is used on are to illustrate concepts, model displays, and reinforce 21st century skills.

Critics cite concerns about the legitimacy, accessibility, and verifiability of digital scholarship and the erosion of authors' rights as reasons to be concerned about digital scholarship. As scholarly communication evolves, controversy over the definition and value of the term "digital scholarship" is likely to continue.

== Intellectual property ==
Concerns with how to regulate digital scholarship have arisen across universities across the world. The explosion in availability and creation of scholarly works has led many universities to adjust their policies on how they will manage scholarship in the future. These universities feel pressured to take action because digital technologies have led to the easy reproduction and commodification of these creations. Many universities are unclear how to address the copyrighting of online classes and media presentations. Current law does not cover these specific areas of media produced in the academic world. In the past any printed work done by professors was considered their intellectual property, but now the question stands as to who owns these different forms of multimedia. One of the main concerns of faculty is that universities will soon take ownership of this digital media.

Universities have taken a growing interest in creations that have revenue-generating potential, like online classes or lecture slides, while also showing concern for products that may be used by comparable institutions, potentially reducing their competitive advantage. In order to stay on top of others academically, universities have sought to keep the intellectual property created within the university away from others schools. Not only are universities using digital scholarship to make money and stay ahead, but they also have interests in protecting their brand.

While universities attempt to protect digital scholarship, it is in many professors best interests for their creations to be seen by the world as to grow their brand and acclaim as a professor. Laws that may apply to digital scholarship are largely outdated but professors would like to use the argument of faculty ownership of traditional works as historical practice and practice compatible with mission of higher education as a public good. Professors argue that it took time and serious effort to make the presentations, slides, media. To date professors have been rarely questioned whether they have the right to bring their course outlines, lecture outlines, and lecture notes with them if they decide to leave the university where they created them. Change over the ability of professors to bring digital scholarship with them is expected as universities have begun to take notice and assert copyrights. Professors will argue that since they are the creators and authors of the product they are the owners according to law.

As of now most copyright laws in America indicate that the author or creator holds the copyright, but the same cannot be said for digital scholarship. The law explicitly states that if the work is within the scope of his or her employment then the work is the property of the employer. Since the employer here would be the university, professors are technically creating work for hire. While faculty of universities appear to not be credited for their work, the primary reason for a university to take ownership of a faculty's work is that the member created the work using university funds mostly. Solutions to the lack of clear laws regarding ownership of digital scholarship are not currently being created but many universities have created written contracts with professors over who owns future work or what they can do with previous work.

For example, in the U.S. Supreme Court case Stanford v. Roche, the court decided that Roche, a former Stanford researcher, was a co-owner with Stanford of patents for testing kits to detect HIV. While this case does not deal with digital scholarship directly, it deals with the ownership of intellectual property of university employees when they leave. This case will set a precedent for future decisions with online classes, lecture notes, and outlines.

== National Education Association policy ==
The National Education Association, the largest professional educational association in the United States, updated its policy on digital learning in 2013. The policy stresses that students need to develop "advanced critical thinking and information literacy skills and master new digital tools", as well as "the initiative to become self-directed learners while adapting to the ever-changing digital information landscape". The National Education Association also believes that digital learning creates an environment in which learning can be more individualized to meet the needs of each student. It mandates that all public schools must do their best to acquire necessary modern technologies and constantly revise teaching plans to incorporate technology where viable to best prepare students for the 21st century. The National Education Association's digital learning policy also states that technology must be used in an adaptive manner as to not become a distraction and to remain a tool, as well as that technology should not become a replacement for instructors, merely a supplement.
