= Gillian Hart =

American geographer (born 1946)

Gillian Patricia Hart (born 1946) is a geographer, best known for her books Rethinking the South African Crisis (2014), Disabling Globalization (2002), and Power, Labor, and Livelihood (1986). She graduated with a PhD from Cornell University in 1978. She is a professor emerita at the University of California, Berkeley, and a professor at the University of the Witwatersrand. She received a Vega Medal from Victoria, Crown Princess of Sweden in April 2018.
