= Frank Bechhofer =

British sociologist (1935–2018)

Frank Bechhofer FRSE (10 October 1935 – 10 December 2018) was a British sociologist. He is known for studies around social class and national identity.

== Early life ==
Bechhofer was born in Nuremberg on 10 October 1935. He left Germany at the age of three, coming to the United Kingdom in 1939, and his parents settled in Nottingham. He attended Nottingham Grammar School. According to interview notes from 2001, he spent time in the Royal Artillery in the BAOR, from 1954 to 1956. He went to Queens' College, Cambridge in 1956, having been admitted to read mathematics. Doubting his own ability, he chose engineering instead. He spent time as a student on drama, in the long vacation running a theatre company, which became an abiding interest.

As a graduate student in the Department of Engineering, he had a scholarship from Queens' in 1960, and then a further grant from the Department of Scientific and Industrial Research. Under the influence of Stuart Chase, he took an innovative business management course set up by Frederick John Willett (1922–1993). It included a history course by Geoffrey Best and a law course by Bill Wedderburn. He was awarded a master's degree in 1962. At this point Bechhofer made the decision to leave engineering.

== Academic ==
At Willett's suggestion, Bechhofer began a doctorate at Cambridge, making a false start on the steel industry, and constructing a survey of engineering graduates. He then went into research on industrial sociology and the sociology of work, joining the research team in the Department of Applied Economics at Cambridge led by John Goldthorpe, David Lockwood, and Jennifer Platt. Their research, conducted between 1962 and 1965, was published in three jointly authored volumes in 1968–69 and subsequently translated into German, Swedish, French, and Italian.

Bechhofer's interests changed again and in 1965 he moved to the University of Edinburgh as a lecturer, where he studied social inequality and class society. In 1971 he was promoted to reader and in 1987 he was given the chair of social research. At the request of the head of the sociology department, Tom Burns, Bechhofer also taught methods of sociology, for which he founded a seminar that was usually held in Cambridge. The seminar required him to study the subject matter intensively in order, as he said, to be at least one lesson ahead of his students; there resulted his Principles of Research Design in the Social Sciences (2000) with Lindsay Paterson. He investigated topics such as small and medium-sized shopkeepers with Brian Elliot, SME (small and medium enterprises) policy, and small and medium-sized businesses in Great Britain with Brian Elliot and David McCrone.

In 1975 Bechhofer went to the University of Warsaw as a visiting professor. His research by then was on Scottish demography and occupational structures. In the late 1980s he coordinated the Edinburgh team consisting of Michael Anderson, David McCrone, and Bob Morris in the study of social change in the Kirkcaldy-Glenrothes area of Fife. It resulted in a study of national identity and nationalism, and the publication of Understanding National Identity (2015).

Bechhofer in 1984 repurposed the existing Social Sciences Research Centre at Edinburgh, as the Research Centre for Social Sciences; he was its director to 1997. He chaired the British Sociological Association from 1984 to 1986. He took early retirement in 1997 and became professor emeritus, to write. In 2008 he was elected to the Royal Society of Edinburgh.

== Works ==
- (as editor) Population Growth and the Brain Drain, Edinburgh University Press, Edinburgh 1969, ISBN 978-0-85224-066-3
- (with Lindsay Paterson) Principles of Research Design in the Social Sciences, 2000
- (with Lindsay Paterson and David McCrone) Living in Scotland: Social and Economic Change since 1980, 2004
- (with David McCrone) National Identity, Nationalism and Constitutional Change, 2009
- (with David McCrone) Understanding National Identity, Cambridge University Press, Cambridge 2015, ISBN 978-1-107-10038-1

== Family ==
Bechhofer married in 1960 the child psychologist Jean Conochie, daughter of W. K. Conochie of Lerwick. She became Head of Child Clinical Psychology Services at the Royal Hospital for Sick Children, Edinburgh. They were both involved in running Edinburgh Folk Club, to 1994.
