= Konrad Jarausch =

German-American historian (1941–2026)

Konrad Hugo Jarausch (14 August 1941 – 1 September 2026) was a German-American historian and the Lurcy Professor of European Civilization at the University of North Carolina at Chapel Hill. The focus of his work was German history, with his earlier work being on Adolf Hitler's rise to power. Later works of Jarausch were more concerned with East Germany, German reunification, and cultural democratization. He was the son of a German soldier and was an uncompromising critic of the Third Reich (see his books Reluctant Accomplice and Shattered Past, among others).

== Life and career ==
Konrad Hugo Jarausch was born in Magdeburg, Germany, on 14 August 1941. He earned his PhD in History at the University of Wisconsin in 1969 and wrote his first book while completing his doctorate. Jarausch was Assistant to Full Professor of History at the University of Missouri from 1968-1983 before coming to Chapel Hill in 1983.

He served as a president of the German Studies Association (1985–1986) and as the editor of Zeithistorische Forschungen/Studies in Contemporary History. Jarausch served his profession in many other ways; for example, he was co-founder and past president of the Friends of the German Historical Institute, and in 1993 he co-founded the UNC Center for European Studies.

Jarausch was a Fellow at the Swedish Collegium for Advanced Study in Uppsala, Sweden in the Fall of 1988. He earned dozens of additional honors, grants, and awards. Jarausch also mentored many hundreds of graduate students during his long career at UNC. At any give time, he had 15-25 advisees, and was known for his continued mentorship and influence long after his students had left.

== Personal life and death ==
Konrad Jarausch was born in Magdeburg, eastern Germany, in 1941 and raised in Bavaria and the Rhineland; studied at the University of Wisconsin in Madison and also had a post-doc at Princeton; and lived the second half of his life in Berlin and Chapel Hill, NC, where he died on 1 September 2026, at the age of 85. His body was recovered from a lake where he had been swimming earlier that day. Jarausch left behind his wife of many decades, Hannelore Jarausch – former director of the French Language Program at UNC Chapel Hill – along with two sons and four grandchildren.

"I distinctly remember Konrad becoming visibly restless in the late afternoons after long project discussions or institute exams," said long-time friend and colleague Christoph Kleßmann. "Whereas others, including myself, would be more likely to withdraw to a pub, he first had to go swimming or jogging to reduce the academic stress. This left him ready to take up work on one of his many books the next morning at home with renewed energy."

Following Dr. Jarausch's death on 1 September 2026, the North Carolina German Studies community issued a statement that read, in part, "He was a beloved teacher of undergraduate students and a mentor of over sixty PhD students.... Konrad dedicated his life and his academic work to mentoring students and younger colleagues and building bridges across the Atlantic. He was a treasured friend, colleague and mentor both, in North America and Germany."

== Selected publications ==
Konrad Jarausch was author, co-author, editor, or co-editor of approximately 50 books, and author of roughly 350 journal articles and book chapters. Among his more notable books:

- Jarausch, Konrad H. and Karen Hagemann, eds. German Migrant Historians in North America: Transatlantic Careers and Scholarship after 1945 (2024)
- Jarausch, Konrad H. The Burden of German History: A Transatlantic Life (2023)
- Jarausch, Konrad H. Embattled Europe: A Progressive Alternative (2021)
- Jarausch, Konrad H. Broken Lives: How Ordinary Germans Experienced the 20th Century. Princeton University Press. 2018. ISBN 9780691174587.
- Jarausch, Konrad H., Harald Wenzel, and Karin Goihl, eds. Different Germans, Many Germanies: New Transatlantic Perspectives (2018)
- Jarausch, Konrad H. Out of Ashes: A New History of Europe in the Twentieth Century (2015)
- Jarausch, Konrad H., ed. United Germany: Debating Processes and Prospects (2015)
- Jarausch, Konrad H. Reluctant Accomplice: A Wehrmacht Soldier's Letters from the Eastern Front (2011)
- Jarausch, Konrad H., et al., eds. Gebrochene Wissenschaftskulturen : Universität und Politik im 20. Jahrhundert (2010)
- Jarausch, Konrad H. After Hitler: Recivilizing Germans, 1945-1995 (2008)
- Jarausch, Konrad H. “Das stille Sterben…”: Feldpostbriefe von Konrad Jarausch aus Polen und Russland (2008)
- Jarausch, Konrad H. and Thomas Lindenberger, eds. Conflicted Memories: Europeanizing Contemporary Histories (2007)
- Jarausch, Konrad H. Die Umkehr: Deutsche Wandlungen 1945-1995 (2004)
- Jarausch, Konrad H. and Michael Geyer. Shattered Past: Reconstructing German Histories (2002)
- Jarausch, Konrad H., ed. Dictatorship as Experience: Towards a Socio-Cultural History of the GDR (1999)
- Jarausch, Konrad H., ed. After Unity: Reconfiguring German Identities (1997)
- Jarausch, Konrad H. and Hannes Siegrist, eds. Amerikanisierung und Sowjetisierung in Deutschland 1945-1970 (1997)
- Jarausch, Konrad H. The Rush to German Unity (1994)
- Jarausch, Konrad H. and Kenneth A. Hardy. Quantitative Methods for Historians: A Guide to Research, Data, and Statistics (1991)
- Jarausch, Konrad H., J. Rüsen, and H. Schleier, eds. Geschichtswissenschaft vor dem Jahr 2000. Historiographie, Theorie und Sozialgeschichte (1991)
- Jarausch, Konrad H. and Geoffrey Cocks, eds. German Professions, 1800-1950 (1990)
- Jarausch, Konrad H. Deutsche Studenten 1800-1970 (1984)
- Jarausch, Konrad H. Students, Society and Politics in Imperial Germany: The Rise of Academic Illiberalism (1982)
- Jarausch, Konrad H. The Enigmatic Chancellor: Bethmann Hollweg and the Hubris of Imperial Germany, 1856-1921 (1973)
- Jarausch, Konrad H. The Four Power Pact, 1933 (1966)
