= Geoffrey Ingham =

British sociologist, political economist

- Born: 1942 (age 83–84)
- Occupation: Sociologist
- Known for: The Nature of Money

Academic background
- Education: University of Leicester, University of Cambridge

Geoffrey Ingham (born 1942) is a British sociologist, political economist, and author of books on capitalism and money.

== Career ==
Ingham was born in 1942, and read sociology at the University of Leicester, graduating in 1964. He attended Cambridge University as a postgraduate student, where he was awarded a Ph.D degree in 1968. After teaching at Sussex and Leicester Universities, he became a lecturer in the Faculty of Economics, Cambridge in 1971 and Fellow of Christ's College, Cambridge in 1972. He was Reader in Sociology and Political Economy at Cambridge, and remains emeritus Professor at the University of Cambridge and a Fellow of Christ's.

== Works ==
- Money. What is Political Economy (2020)
- Capitalism (2008)
- Money: Interdisciplinary Perspectives from Economics, Sociology and Political Science (2005)
- The Nature of Money (2004)
- Capitalism Divided? The City and Industry in British Social Development (1984)
