= Sonya O. Rose =

American historian (1935–2020)

- Born: 1935
- Died: 15 October 2020 (aged 84–85); Sarasota, Florida, United States

Academic background
- Education: Antioch College; Northwestern University

Academic work
- Discipline: Cultural history, women's history, gender history
- Sub-discipline: 19th and 20th Century Britain and the British Empire
- Institutions: University of Michigan
- Notable works: Which People's War? (2003)

Sonya Orleans Rose (1935 – October 15, 2020) was an American historian and sociologist whose work focused on the cultural history of the United Kingdom and the British Empire in the 19th and 20th centuries. She was particularly known for her contribution to women's and gender history.

== Career ==
Rose was born in 1935 and grew up in New York and Ohio. She received a Bachelor of Arts degree from Antioch College and pursued postgraduate studies in sociology at Northwestern University where she earned a Master of Arts degree in 1962 and a doctorate in 1974. Her doctoral dissertation was entitled Managing uncertainty: The honeymoon period of new patients on an adolescent ward. She began her academic career at Colby College in 1974 before moving to the University of Michigan in 1993.

As well as teaching sociology and women's studies, Rose became increasingly interested in cultural history and, in particular, gender history in the context of the United Kingdom in the 19th and 20th centuries. She published Limited Livelihoods: Gender and Class in Nineteenth-Century England (1992) which explored the relationship between gender and capitalism in a range of industries during the Industrial Revolution. Historian Angela Woollacott notes that according to Rose, class and gender are not separate systems or structures in 19th century industrial England, but the "content of class relations is gendered and the content of gender distinctions and gender relations is 'classed'". She also co-edited Gender and Class in Modern Europe (1996) and Gender, Citizenships and Subjectivities (2002).

On the basis of an article in the American Historical Review in 1998, Rose published a major monograph on the cultural history of the United Kingdom in World War II entitled Which People’s War? National Identity and Citizenship in Wartime Britain, 1939–1945 (2003). The work, focusing on nationalism and class, has been described as "one of the key interventions in the history of wartime Britain." It was inspired by Rose's own experiences in the United States at the time of the September 11 attacks and the outbreak of the Iraq War. After this, she was involved in the "imperial turn" in British historiography and co-edited At Home with the Empire: Metropolitan Culture and the Imperial World (2006).

Before her retirement to the United Kingdom, Rose wrote a synthetic studies of gender history entitled What Is Gender History? (2010) and co-edited The Oxford Handbook of Gender, War, and the Western World since 1600 (2020).

== Death ==
Rose died on October 15, 2020, in Sarasota, Florida, at the age of 84.
