= Ida Blom =

Norwegian historian (1931–2016)

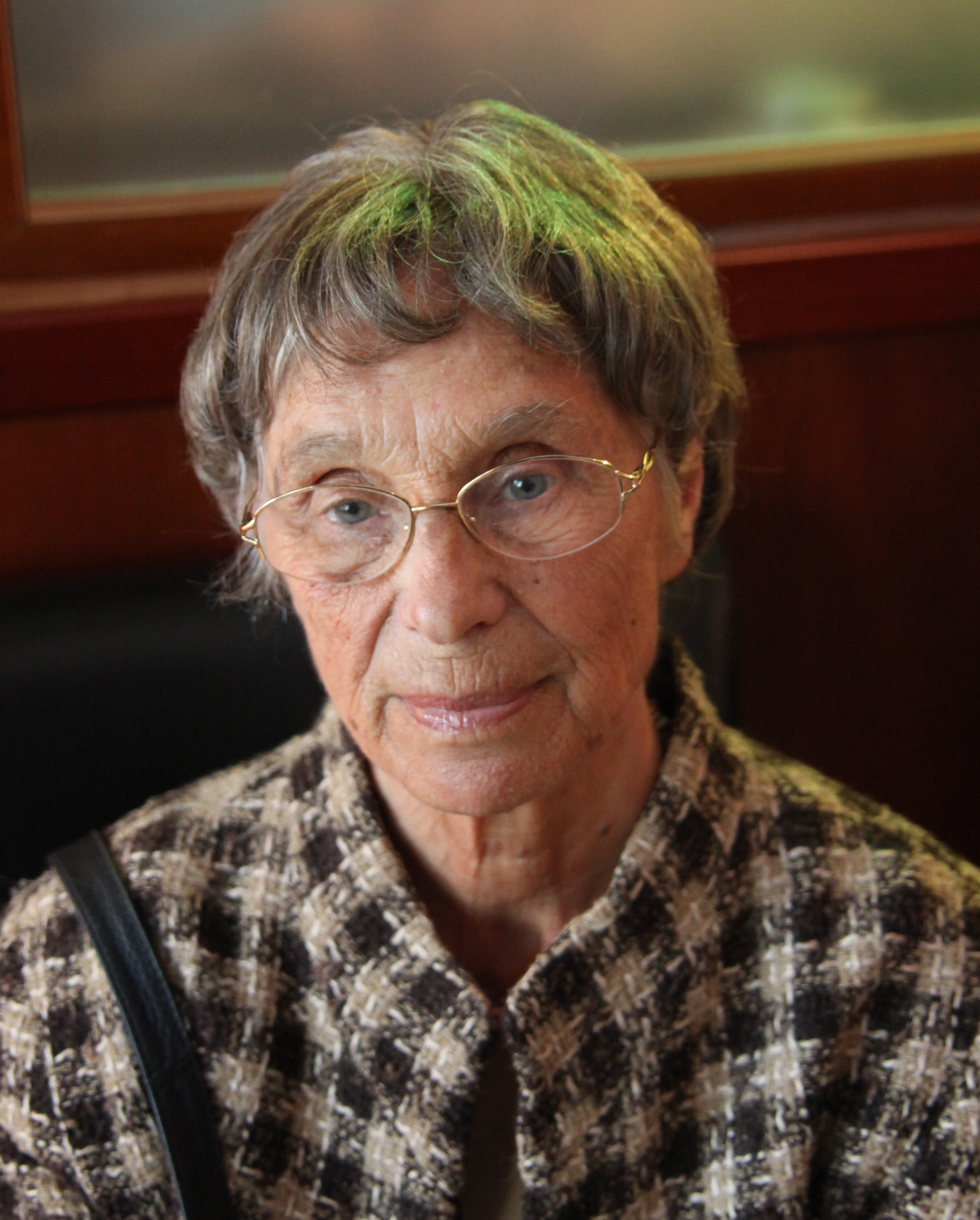
Ida Blom

Ida Blom (20 January 1931 in Gentofte – 26 November 2016) was a Norwegian historian.

She graduated from the University of Bergen in 1961, and then took her doctorate there in 1972 while working as a research assistant. She was a professor in women's history at the University of Bergen from 1985 to 2001, and later a professor emeritus at the same school.

She was a member of the Norwegian Academy of Science and Letters. She was awarded the Gina Krog Prize in 2009.

== Selected bibliography ==
- Nasjonal reisning: pressgruppepolitikk i Grønlandsspørsmålet 1921-31, 1972
- Kjønnsroller og likestilling, 1983
- "Den haarde dyst": Fødsler og fødselshjelp gjennom 150 år, 1988
- Det er forskjell på folk - nå som før, 1994
- Cappelens kvinnehistorie (ed.), 1992
  - This book received the Brage Prize
