= Gurminder K. Bhambra =

British sociologist

Gurminder K. Bhambra is a British sociologist, theorist, and public intellectual specialising in postcolonial and global historical sociology. Her current work focuses on epistemological justice and reparations. While her research primarily focuses on global historical sociology, she is also interested in the intersection of the social sciences. Bhambra grew up in Britain and is of British Indian decent, her parents being British Citizens who moved from India, to Kenya, before settling in Britain.

== Career ==
Bhambra is currently Professor of Postcolonial and Decolonial Studies at the University of Sussex and a Fellow of the British Academy. Previously, she was Professor of Sociology at the University of Warwick and held visiting professorships at Linnaeus University, EHESS, Paris, Princeton University, University of Brasilia.

Bhambra is centrally involved in numerous public sociology projects, including online magazine Discover Society, website providing brief introductions to theory and theorists Global Social Theory, and open-access curriculum project Connected Sociologies.

Bhambra is the series editor of the Theory for a Global Age Series, originally published by Bloomsbury until 2015 when it moved to Manchester University Press.

Bhambra has held visiting fellowships and professorships, including as Guest Professor of Sociology and History at the Centre for Concurrences in Colonial and Postcolonial Studies, Linnaeus University, Sweden (2016–2018), during which time she was also visiting professor at EHESS, Paris (2017). Prior to these appointments, she was a visiting fellow in the Department of Sociology and a Visitor at the Institute for Advanced Study, both at Princeton University, a Visiting academic at the University of Brasilia, and held an affiliation with REMESO, Linköping University, Sweden. In 2020, Bhambra was elected as a Fellow of the British Academy, in the Sociology, Demography and Social Statistics section.

=== Public sociology projects ===
==== Discover Society ====
Bhambra was involved in setting up and co-edits Discover Society with John Holmwood and Sue Scott alongside Pat Lockley as not-for-profit online magazine to promote accessible social research, commentary, and policy analysis.

==== Global Social Theory ====
Bhambra set up Global Social Theory in 2015, a website that provides brief introductions to theorists and theories from around the world, in response to the student campaign 'Why is my curriculum white?'.

==== Connected Sociologies Curriculum Project ====
Bhambra is the Project Director of the Connected Sociologies Curriculum Project, launched in October 2020 and funded by The Sociological Review. This project is an open-access collaborative effort to addresses British colonial and imperial histories and how they shape the present, with particular attention to the teaching of Sociology and Bhambra's ongoing work critiquing Eurocentric conceptualisations of modernity and history.

==== Public talks and media ====
In 2017, she gave a TEDxBrum talk called 'Everything you know about Brexit is wrong' exploring dominant narratives on Brexit through her broader work on the idea of Britain as a nation.

Nottingham Contemporary hosted a 2019 talk 'Whose Welfare? Colonial Regimes of Extraction and British Subjecthood'. The same year she provided a keynote address to the Atlantic Institute's Global Convening of Senior Fellows titled' History Matters: Inequalities, Reparation and Redistribution'.

Bhambra appeared on the Social Science Bites Podcast in January 2020 discussing postcolonial social science.

== Awards and recognition ==
Bhambra's first monograph, Rethinking Modernity: Postcolonialism and the Sociological Imagination (2007), won the British Sociological Association's 2008 Philip Abrams Memorial Prize for best first book in sociology, with the committee stating that the book "presents a fundamental reconstruction of the idea of modernity in contemporary sociology and social theory".

== Works ==
=== Books ===
- Bhambra, Gurminder K. (2007). Rethinking Modernity: Postcolonialism and the Sociological Imagination. London: Palgrave Macmillan.
- Bhambra, Gurminder K. (2014). Connected Sociologies. London: Bloomsbury.

=== Edited books ===
- Bhambra, Gurminder K.; Shilliam, Robbie, eds. (2009). Silencing Human Rights: Critical Engagements with a Contested Project. London: Palgrave Macmillan.
- Bhambra, Gurminder K.; Demir, Ipek, eds. (2009). 1968 in Retrospect: History, Theory, Alterity. London: Palgrave Macmillan.
- Bhambra, Gurminder K.; Orrells, Daniel; Roynon, Tessa, eds. (2011). African Athena: New Agendas. Oxford: Oxford University Press.
- Bhambra, Gurminder K.; Narayan, John, eds. (2017). European Cosmopolitanism: Colonial Histories and Postcolonial Societies. London: Routledge.
- Bhambra, Gurminder K.; Gebrial, Dalia; Nişancıoğlu, Kerem, eds. (2018). Decolonising the University. London: Pluto Press.
