= Lucia Pradella =

Researcher and author

Lucia Pradella is a researcher and author with expertise in the field of International Political Economy. She has held positions at the Università Ca' Foscari Venezia and has been a visiting scholar at SOAS. She is best known for her work "L'Attualità del Capitale" and Globalisation and the Critique of Political Economy.

== Biography ==
Pradella is an academic and researcher specializing in critical studies of Political Economy and labor dynamics in Europe. She studied at the Università Ca' Foscari Venezia and the Humboldt University in Berlin. She is a Research Associate in the SOAS Department of Development Studies and the Centre for the Global Political Economy at the University of Sussex and a member of the Laboratory for Social Research at Ca’ Foscari.

Pradella's research encompasses work on Karl Marx's critique of political economy. Her research also examines contemporary processes of impoverishment, global economic crises, and their impact on poverty and immigration.

Pradella has contributed to public discourse through her writings for The Guardian and publications such as Jacobin, Red Pepper discussing contemporary social issues. She has also had influence on the journal International Socialism. Pradella is a member of the Council for European Studies, the European International Studies Association (EISA), and the European Society for the History of Economic Thought.

== Selected bibliography ==
- Globalization and the Critique of Political Economy: New Insights from Marxʼs Writings - Pradella, L. (2014)-Routledge
- "Marx and the Global South: Connecting History and Value Theory "- Pradella, L. (2017)-Sociology
- "Hegel, Imperialism, and Universal History" - Pradella, L. (2014) Published in Science and Society
- "It's madness to 'privatise' Marx – thanks to Piketty he's back in vogue". Pradella, L. (5 May 2014). The Guardian
