= British Sociological Association =

Learned society

- Formation: 1951; 75 years ago
- Type: Registered charity
- Registration no.: 1080235
- Headquarters: Chancery Court, Belmont Business Park, Durham DH1 1TW
- Services: Scholarly and professional society for sociologists in the United Kingdom
- Website: https://www.britsoc.co.uk

The British Sociological Association (BSA) is a scholarly and professional society for sociologists in the United Kingdom. Founded in 1951, the BSA is the national subject association for sociology in the UK. It publishes the academic journals Sociology, Work, Employment and Society, Sociological Research Online and Cultural Sociology (with SAGE Publications) as well as its membership magazine Network and a monthly eNewsletter.

== History ==
Prior to the foundation of the British Sociological Association, other societies and organisations relevant to social sciences existed in the UK. These included the British Association for the Advancement of Science (1833), which became the Royal Statistical Society, and the National Association for the Promotion of Social Science (1857).

Victor Branford originated the idea of founding a British Sociological Society, aiming to use it as a vehicle to promote the ideas of Patrick Geddes. This led to the founding of The Sociological Society in 1903. The faction of the society concerned with supporting eugenics broke off to form The Eugenics Society in 1907.

In 1907–8, a group formed within The Sociological Society which focussed on geography and urban planning. Several years later, the British Medical Association had developed a medical sociology section by 1913, this primarily concerned itself with eugenics and disease hereditability. The Sociological Society eventually reformed into The Institute of Sociology.

=== Founding and early years ===
The British Sociological Association initially grew out of activities at the London School of Economics, which had produced the first posts in sociology in the United Kingdom in 1907 and become a significant hub of activity.

On May 16, 1951, The Times newspaper published a letter which announced the founding of the British Sociological Association. The signatories to this letter wrote that:

"The scope of the association has deliberately been made very wide, in order to bring together all those who are interested in the sociological aspects of their own special subjects. It is intended to cover in this way, not only contemporary, historical, and comparative studies of social structure in the widest sense, but also social philosophy, psychology, and biology, human geography, and such special fields as demography and criminology. The association plans to bring representatives of these various fields together in periodic national conferences and also in regular local meetings in London and the provinces".

The signatories to this first letter announcing the founding of the association were: Alexander Carr-Saunders, David Glass, V. Gordon Childe, Raymond Firth, M. Fortes, Morris Ginsberg, T. H. Marshall, T. H. Pear, W. J. H. Sprott, T. S. Simey, Richard Titmuss, Barbara Wootton, and R. J Goodman.

The London School of Economics allocated office space to the running of the British Sociological Association in addition to secretarial support. In these early years, the British Sociological Association received funding from the Nuffield Foundation.

By the end of 1951, the British Sociological Association had a membership of approximately 500 - with just 35% employed in universities. Early membership primarily reflected the organisation's anchoring in London, with 60% of the 1958 membership based in London. Early on, the executive frequently involved members from allied-disciplines such as social anthropology. For example, John Barnes, J. C. Mitchell, Peter Worsley each began their careers as anthropologists and all went on to hold positions as BSA president or be the holder of a major chair. In Craig Calhoun's opinion, this reflected an inversion of the contemporaneous US dynamic where anthropology departments were "under the domination of larger, more powerful sociology departments".

During the mid-century period, the association's approach to sociology was entangled with the development of the welfare state - many of the BSA's early members were actively involved as advisors during the growth of the welfare state.

The British Sociological Association held its first conference at Queen Elizabeth College (then part of the University of London) from 27 to 29 March 1953. The theme of this first conference was 'Social Policy and the Social Sciences'. It was attended by 233 people, of whom 125 were association members. The Scottish branch of the British Sociological Association held its first working conference in Edinburgh in February 1955. The conference was chaired by Edinburgh University's Kenneth Little.

== Organisation ==
The British Sociological Association contains several subgroups. The medical sociology group was founded in 1969. According to the BSA, the medical sociology group "promotes scholarship and communication in the field of the sociology of health and illness" and is "one of the largest and most active study groups of the BSA"

=== Administration and governance ===
The BSA is a registered charitable company (charity no: 1080235). The activities of the BSA are overseen by the board of trustees which is the decision-making body responsible for setting and implementing strategy. An Advisory Forum, including representatives from all of the constituencies within the Association and the BSA President, provides a two-way channel for information exchange between the members of the Association and the Trustees. An office of 10 staff members takes care of the day-to-day running of the Association.

== Presidents ==
- Rachel Brooks 2024–
- Gurminder K. Bhambra 2022–2023
- Susan Halford, 2018–2021
- Lynn Jamieson, 2014–2018
- John Holmwood, 2012–2014
- John Brewer, 2009–2012
- Sue Scott, 2007–2009
- Geoff Payne, 2005–2007
- Joan Busfield, 2003–2005
- John Scott, 2001–2003
- Sara Arber, 1999–2001
- David Morgan, 1997–1999
- Stuart Hall, 1995–1997
- Michèle Barrett, 1993–1995
- John Westergaard, 1991–1993
- Sir Robert Burgess, 1989–1991
- Jennifer Platt, 1987–1989
- Martin Albrow, 1985–1987
- Richard Brown, 1983–1985
- Margaret Stacey, 1981–1983
- John Eldridge, 1979–1981
- Keith Kelsall, 1977–1979
- Sheila Allen, 1975–1977
- Peter Worsley, 1971–1975
- Tom Bottomore, 1969–1971
- T. H. Marshall, 1964–1969
- Barbara Wootton, Baroness Wootton of Abinger, 1959–1964
- Morris Ginsberg, 1955–1957

== Publications ==
=== Academic journals ===
The BSA publishes Sociology, Work, Employment and Society, Cultural Sociology, and Sociological Research Online.

=== Network magazine ===
The Association publishes a magazine, Network, for its members three times a year, Spring, Summer and Autumn.

== Awards ==
=== Philip Abrams Memorial Prize ===
The Philip Abrams Memorial Prize has been awarded almost every year since 1989 for "the best first and sole-authored book within the discipline of Sociology". The prize is named for professor Philip Abrams (1933–1981). Past winners include:

- Barbara Adam (1991, for Time and Social Theory)
- Bridget Anderson (2001, for Doing the Dirty Work? The Global Politics of Domestic Labour)
- Graeme Kirkpatrick (2005, for Critical Technology: A Social Theory of Personal Computing)
- Gurminder K Bhambra (2008, for Rethinking Modernity: Postcolonialism and the Sociological Imagination)
- Rhoda Wilkie (2011, for Livestock/Deadstock)
- Monika Krause (2015, for The Good Project: Humanitarian Relief NGOs and the Fragmentation of Reason)
- Maddie Breeze (2016, for Seriousness and Women's Roller Derby: Gender, Organization and Ambivalence).
- Paul Ian Campbell (2017, for Football, Ethnicity and Community: The Life of An African-Caribbean Football Club)
- Lucy Mayblin (2018, for After Empire: Colonial Legacies in the Politics of Asylum Seekers)
- Remy Joseph-Salisbury (2019, for Black Mixed-Race Men: Transatlanticity, Hybridity and 'Post-Racial' Resilience
- Anna Bull (2020, for Class Control and Classical Music)
- Luke de Noronha (2021, for Deporting Black Britons: Portraits of Deportation to Jamaica)
- Natasha Carver (2022, for Marriage, Gender and Refugee Migration: Spousal Relationships among Somali Muslims in the United Kingdom)
- Christoph Wu (2023, for Central Banks in Organizational Networks: Entangled Market Actors)
- Sarah Kunz (2024, Expatriate: Following A Migration Category)
- Billy Holzberg (2025, Affective Bordering: Race, Deservingness and the Emotional Politics of Migration Control)
