= John Scott (sociologist) =

English sociologist

John Scott CBE FRSA FBA FAcSS
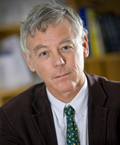
- Born: John Peter Scott; 8 April 1949 (age 77); London, England

Academic background
- Education: Kingston College of Technology; University of Strathclyde
- Thesis: Towards a Model of Status (1976)
- Doctoral advisor: Percy Cohen; John Westergaard

Academic work
- Discipline: Sociology
- Institutions: University of Strathclyde; University of Leicester; University of Essex; University of Plymouth
- Website: johnscottcbe.com

John Peter Scott CBE FRSA FBA FAcSS (born 8 April 1949) is an English sociologist working on issues of economic and political sociology, social stratification, the history of sociology, and social network analysis. He is currently working independently, and has previously worked at the Universities of Strathclyde, Leicester, Essex, and Plymouth. He is a Fellow of the British Academy (elected 2007), a Fellow of the Royal Society of Arts (elected 2005), and a Fellow of the Academy of Social Sciences (elected 2003). He has been a member of the British Sociological Association since 1970. In 2015 he became Chair of Section S4 of the British Academy. In 2016 he was awarded an Honorary Doctorate of Essex University.

== Early life and education ==
John Scott was born in Battersea, London, and spent most of his childhood in Feltham, Middlesex. He attended Cardinal Road Infant school, Hanworth Road Junior school and Hampton Grammar School. Following a repeat year to improve his A-level results he studied for a Bachelor of Science degree in sociology at Kingston College of Technology (now Kingston University) from 1968 to 1971.

He started a PhD in sociology at the London School of Economics under the supervision of John Westergaard and Percy Cohen. This work explored the relationships between the concepts of status and class, involving a detailed examination of the work of Talcott Parsons. After two years, Scott moved to Strathclyde University and completed his doctoral thesis in 1976.

== Career ==
Scott was appointed to a lectureship at the University of Strathclyde, Glasgow, in 1972. Taking advantage of the Scottish location at a time of the North Sea oil boom and the debate over Scottish devolution, he began a project, with Michael Hughes, on the ownership and control of Scottish businesses and the involvement of economic elites in political power. An early paper from this project appeared in The Red Paper on Scotland, edited by future Prime Minister Gordon Brown. Scott was a member of the Quantitative Sociology Group of the British Sociological Association and, through this group, developed an interest in network analysis through contacts established with Barry Wellman, Joel Levine, Michael Schwartz, and Frans Stokman. Moving to Leicester University in 1976, Scott extended his research into an international comparative study of economic networks, working with Stokman and Rolf Ziegler on a project reported in Networks of Corporate Power. He formed the Social Networks Study Group of the British Sociological Association, jointly with J. Clyde Mitchell, and began work that appeared in Social Network Analysis: A Handbook. He also undertook work on capitalist class formation that appeared in Who Rules Britain? At Leicester he was head of department from 1992 to 1994, succeeding Terry Johnson (and before him Joe Banks and Ilya Neustadt).

A move in 1994 to Essex University, the leading sociology department in the UK, allowed Scott to develop wider interests in sociological theory and the history of sociology. He produced Sociological Theory in 1995 and Social Theory in 2006, the former setting out an account of the major ideas of key figures and the latter setting out an analytical account of key themes in sociological analysis. He began a study, with Christopher Husbands and Ray Bromley, of early British sociology, focusing on the work of Victor Branford and Patrick Geddes. At Essex he was Dean of the School of Social Sciences from 2000 to 2003. He moved to Plymouth University in 2008 and was appointed as pro vice-chancellor for research in 2010. At Plymouth he continued his work on social network analysis, the history of sociology, and social theory, producing, with Peter Carrington, The Sage Handbook of Social Network Analysis and, as sole author, Conceptualising the Social World. He retired from Plymouth University in 2013.

Scott was elected as president of the British Sociological Association in 2001, succeeding Sara Arber, having previously held the posts of Newsletter Editor, Secretary (1990–1992), Assistant Treasurer (1996–1998), and Chairperson (1992–93). He is currently an Honorary Vice-president. He is a member of the Research and Higher Education Policy Committee of the British Academy. Scott has served on the Sociology Panel for the 2001 Research Assessment Exercise (RAE), was Panel Chair in the 2008 RAE, and was appointed as Panel Chair for the 2014 Research Excellence Framework. He has also been an Assessor for the Teaching Quality Assessment, the A-Level Core Curriculum Working Party of the School Curriculum and Assessment Authority, the Subject Benchmarking Group of the Quality Assurance Agency, and numerous other committees. He was an adjunct professor at Bergen University, Norway, from 1997 to 2005 and has held short visiting positions at Hirosaki University, Ritsumeikan University, Hitotsubashi University, and Saitama University in Japan, and at the University of Hong Kong. He currently holds a visiting professorship at the University of Essex, UK, an honorary professorship at the University of Copenhagen, Denmark, and an honorary visiting professorship at the University of Exeter, UK.

Scott was appointed Commander of the Order of the British Empire (CBE) in the 2013 Birthday Honours for services to social science.

== Class, power, and elites ==
Scott has been one of the few British sociologists to investigate the capitalist class and its power. His research in stratification and political economy has explored the changing patterns of ownership in contemporary capitalist economies and the ways in which these changes are reflected in elite recruitment. Critical of the prevailing managerialist interpretation of business enterprise, he developed the influential concept of 'control through a constellation of interests' to describe the dispersed forms of ownership and control that allow representatives of dominant shareholding interests in Britain and the United States to exercise a constraining power over internal business decision-making.

His research on networks of shareholding and interlocking directorships has documented the structures and mechanisms through which this constraining power operates. The research has depicted the varying, path-dependent patterns of control found in major capitalist economies. Scott has contrasted the 'Anglo-American' pattern of controlling constellations with the 'German' pattern of aligned corporate filiations, the 'Latin' pattern of 'corporate webs', and the 'Japanese' pattern of corporate sets.

Scott explored, in the British case, the historical development of a capitalist class through a close association of landholding and financial interests and showed the mechanisms through which this class could be described as a ruling class.

== Theory and methodology ==
Social network analysis has been at the heart of Scott's methodological work. He has helped to popularise this method of structural analysis through synthesising texts and his own applications of the method. He has, in addition, undertaken work on the use of documents in social research, producing, in 1990, A Matter of Record as one of the first texts on this topic. Like his work on social network analysis, this work developed from a practical research involvement in the use of the method. Scott's reflections on documentary research derived initially from his use of company records, civil registration records, and newspapers as source materials in his studies of business organisation.

Scott's commitment to social theory as the core sociological activity dates from his early engagement with the work of Talcott Parsons and has been inspired by that writer's commitment to theoretical synthesis. Scott's view is that behind the contending theoretical explanations proposed by different theorists there is a set of concepts that constitutes a shared foundation for sociological analysis. Thus, concepts of 'structure' and 'action', for example, may inform a variety of competing accounts of particular social phenomena, but there is no necessary opposition between structural and agential accounts. Conceptualisations of the social world can be seen as complementary to each other, and sociologist should eschew the overemphasis of difference if comprehensive, cooperative endeavours are to be produced. Scott's latest work highlights the achievement of sociology as a discipline in establishing a set of fundamental principles of sociological analysis that can be used cooperatively. These are culture, nature, structure, action, system, space-time, mind, and development.

The view that these basic principles of sociological analysis were established early in the history of the discipline and have subsequently been developed and elaborated underpins Scott's interest in the history of sociology. His books on theory have concentrated on the earliest statements of the various arguments considered and have led him to investigate the ideas of many now-forgotten figures. He has, in particular, explored early British sociology and has begun to establish the reputation of Victor Branford, the founder of the Sociological Society and the Sociological Review and the only British sociologist to have been made an Honorary Life member of the American Sociological Society.

== Publications ==
Scott's book publications on stratification and on economic and political sociology include:

- Corporations, Classes and Capitalism, London, Hutchinson, 1979. American edition, St Martins Press. Reprinted 1981. (Japanese translation: Tokyo, Bunshindo, 1983). Completely revised Second Edition 1985
- The Anatomy of Scottish Capital, with M. Hughes, London, Croom Helm, 1980. Canadian edition, McGill Queens.
- The Upper Classes: Property and Privilege in Britain, London, Macmillan, 1982.
- Directors of Industry, with C. Griff, Cambridge, Polity Press, 1984. (Japanese translation: Tokyo, Horitsu Bunka Sha, 1987).
- Networks of Corporate Power, editor with F. Stokman and R. Zeigler, Cambridge, Polity Press, 1985. (Japanese translation: Tokyo, Bunshindo, 1993).
- Capitalist Property and Financial Power, Brighton, Wheatsheaf, 1986. American edition, New York University Press. (Japanese translation: Kyoto, Zeimukeiri Kyokai, 1989).
- Who Rules Britain? Cambridge, Polity Press, 1991, reprinted 1992.
- Poverty and Wealth: Citizenship, Deprivation and Privilege, Harlow, Longman, 1994.
- Stratification and Power: Structures of Class, Status and Domination, Cambridge, Polity Press, 1996.
- Corporate Business and Capitalist Classes, Oxford, Oxford University Press, 1997.
- Power, Cambridge, Polity Press, 2001. (Polish translation: Warszawa, Wydawnictwo SIC, 2006)

His edited collections and compilations in this area include:

- The Sociology of Elites, Three Volumes, editor, Cheltenham, Edward Elgar Publishing, 1990.
- Power. Critical Concepts, Three Volumes, editor, London, Routledge, 1994.
- Class. Critical Concepts, Four Volumes, editor, London, Routledge, 1996.
- Renewing Class Analysis, Sociological Review Monograph, editor with R. Crompton, F. Devine, and M. Savage, Oxford, Blackwell Publishers, 2000.
- Rethinking Class: Culture, Identities, and Lifestyle, editor with R. Crompton, F. Devine, M. Savage, London, Macmillan, 2004.
- Financial Elites and Transnational Business. Who Rules the World? (with Georgina Murray), Cheltenham, Edward Elgar, 2012.
- C. Wright Mills and the Sociological Imagination (with Ann Nilsen), Cheltenham, Edward Elgar, 2013.

His monographs, edited collections and compilations on theories and methods include:

- A Matter of Record: Documentary Sources in Social Research, Cambridge, Polity Press, 1990.
- Sociological Theory: Contemporary Debates, Cheltenham, Edward Elgar, 1995. Second Edition 2012.
- Social Network Analysis, London and Beverley Hills, Sage Publications, 1992. Second Edition, 2000, Third Edition 2012, Fourth Edition 2017. (Italian translation: Roma, La Nuova Italia Scientifica, 1997). (Chinese translation: Chongqing, Chongqing University Press, 2007).
- Sociology (with James Fulcher). Oxford, Oxford University Press, 1999. Second Edition 2003, Third Edition 2007, Fourth Edition 2011.
- Social Structure (with Jose Lopez), Buckingham, Open University Press, 2000.
- Social Networks. Critical Concepts, Four Volumes, editor, London, Routledge, 2002.
- Models and Methods in Social Network Analysis, editor with P. Carrington and S. Wasserman, New York, Cambridge University Press, 2005.
- Documentary Research, Four Volumes, editor, London, Sage, 2006
- Sociology: The Key Concepts, editor and contributor, London, Routledge, 2006.
- Social Theory: Central Issues in Sociology, London, Sage, 2006.
- Fifty Key Sociologists: The Formative Theorists, editor and contributor, London, Routledge, 2007.
- Fifty Key Sociologists: The Contemporary Theorists, editor and contributor, London, Routledge, 2007.
- The SAGE Handbook of Social Network Analysis, editor (with Peter Carrington), London and Beverley Hills, Sage Publications, 2011.
- Conceptualising the Social World. Principles of Sociological Analysis, Cambridge, Cambridge University Press, 2011.
- What Is Social Network Analysis?, London, Bloomsbury Publishing, 2012
- Objectivity and Subjectivity in Social Research (with Gayle Letherby and Malcolm Williams), London, Sage Publications, 2013.
- Envisioning Sociology. Victor Branford, Patrick Geddes, and the Quest for Social Reconstruction (with Ray Bromley), New York, SUNY Press, 2013.
- The Palgrave Handbook of Sociology in Britain, editor (with John Holmwood), London, Palgrave, 2014.

Academic offices
Preceded by Sara Arber	President of the British Sociological Association; 2001–2003	Succeeded by Joan Busfield
