= Sue Scott (sociologist) =

British sociologist

Sue Scott is a British sociologist and feminist whose research has focused primarily on sexuality, gender and risk. She is a visiting professor at the University of Newcastle and an honorary professor at the University of Helsinki. From 2013 to 2019 she was honorary professor in the Centre for Women's Studies at the University of York. She was president of the British Sociological Association 2007–2009 and president of the European Sociological Association 2017–2019. She is a co-founder and managing editor of the Social Science Research Magazine Discover Society.

== Career ==
From 2009 to 2012 she was pro vice-chancellor at Glasgow Caledonian University. She served as president of the British Sociological Association from 2007 to 2009. She has previously served as dean of the Faculty of Humanities and Social Sciences at Keele University And postgraduate dean at Durham University. She was professor of sociology at Durham 1999–2005 and professor of sociology at Stirling University 1997–1999. She has been a member of the ESRC Research Grants Board and was co-chair of the steering group for the ESRC's International Benchmarking of Sociology.

== Discover Society ==
She is managing editor since 2013 (with Professor John Holmwood and Professor Ghurminder Bhambra) of Discover Society, an online magazine for sociological and social policy research, an endeavour inspired by New Society, which published social research and social and cultural commentary from 1962 to 1988.

== Selected books ==
- Scott, S., Williams, G., Platt, S. and Thomas, H. (eds) (1992) Private Risks and Public Dangers. Aldershot, Avebury.
- Scott, S. and Morgan, DHJ. (1993) Body Matters: Essays on the Sociology of the Body. Basingstoke, Falmer.
- Jackson, S and Scott, S (1996) Women and Sexuality: A Reader. Edinburgh University Press and Columbia University Press.
- Jackson, S and Scott, S (eds) (1996) Feminism and Sexuality (Gender and Culture) ISBN 9780231107082
- Jackson, S and Scott, S (eds) Gender, Routledge. 2001
- Jackson, S and Scott, S (2010) Theorising Sexuality. Maidenhead, Open University Press

Academic offices
| Preceded by Geoff Payne | President of the British Sociological Association; 2007–2009 | Succeeded by John David Brewer |
