= Gamer =

Person who plays games

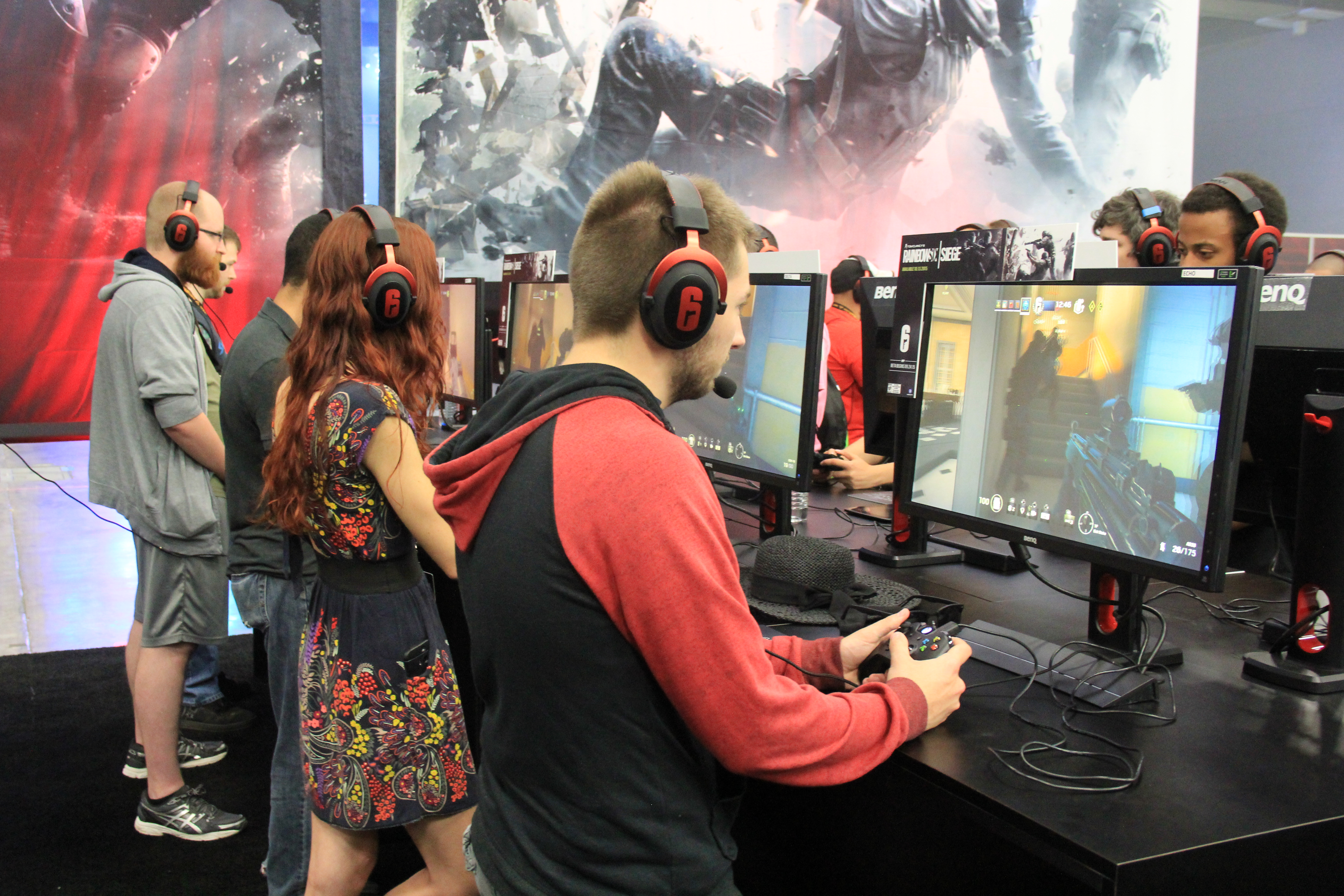
Several gamers playing Tom Clancy's Rainbow Six Siege, a multiplayer video game

A gamer is someone who plays interactive games, either video games, tabletop role-playing games, skill-based card games, or any combination thereof, and who often plays for extended periods of time. Originally a hobby, gaming has evolved into a profession for some, with some gamers routinely competing in games for money, prizes, or awards. In some countries, such as the US, UK, and Australia, the term "gaming" can refer to legalized gambling, which can take both traditional and digital forms, such as through online gambling. There are many different gamer communities around the world. Since the advent of the Internet, many communities take the form of Internet forums or YouTube or Twitch virtual communities, as well as in-person social clubs. In 2021, there were an estimated 3.24 billion gamers across the globe.

== Etymology ==
The term gamer originally meant gambler, and has been in use since at least 1422, when the town laws of Walsall, England, referred to "any dice-player, carder, tennis player, or other unlawful gamer". However, this description has not been adopted in the United States, where it became associated with other pastimes. In the US, they made their appearance as wargames. Wargames were originally created as a military and strategy tool. When Dungeons & Dragons was released, it was originally marketed as a wargame, but later was described by its creators as a role-playing game. They called their players gamers and this is where the word changed definition from someone who gambles to someone who plays board games and/or video games.

== Categories ==
In the United States as of 2018, 28% of gamers are under 18, 29% are 18–35, 20% are 36-49 and 23% are over 50. In the UK as of 2014, 29% are under 18, 32% are 18-35 and 39% are over 36. According to Pew Research Center, 49% of adults have played a video game at some point in their life and those who have are more likely to let their children or future children play. Those who play video games regularly are split roughly equally between male and female, but men are more likely to call themselves a gamer. As of 2019, the average gamer is 33 years old.

=== Female gamer/gamer girl ===
A female gamer, or gamer girl or girl gamer, is any female who regularly engages in playing video games. According to a study conducted by the Entertainment Software Association in 2009, 40% of the game playing population is female, and women 18 or older comprise 34% of all gamers. Also, the percentage of women playing online had risen to 43%, up 4% from 2004. The same study shows that 48% of game purchasers are female. According to a 2015 Pew survey, 6% of women in the United States identify as gamers, compared to 15% of men, and 48% of women and 50% of men play video games. Usage of the term "girl gamer" is controversial. Some critics have advocated use of the label as a reappropriated term, while others see it as non-descriptive or perpetuating the minority position of female gamers. Some critics of the term believe there is no singular definition of a female gamer and that they are as diverse as any other group. However it is generally understood that the term "girl gamer" implies that it is a girl who plays video games.

== Psychology ==
Shigeru Miyamoto says that "I think that first a game needs a sense of accomplishment. And you have to have a sense that you have done something, so that you get that sense of satisfaction of completing something."

In April 2020, researchers found that top gamers shared the same mental toughness as Olympian athletes.

Escapism is a major factor in why individuals enjoy gaming. This idea of being in another world while gaming has become very common with gamers, these video games create a new world where these gamers feel they fit in and can control what is going on. Gaming is a form of escapism, Hideo Kojima states that "If the player isn't tricked into believing that the world is real, then there's no point in making the game."

== Types and demographics ==
=== Gaymer ===
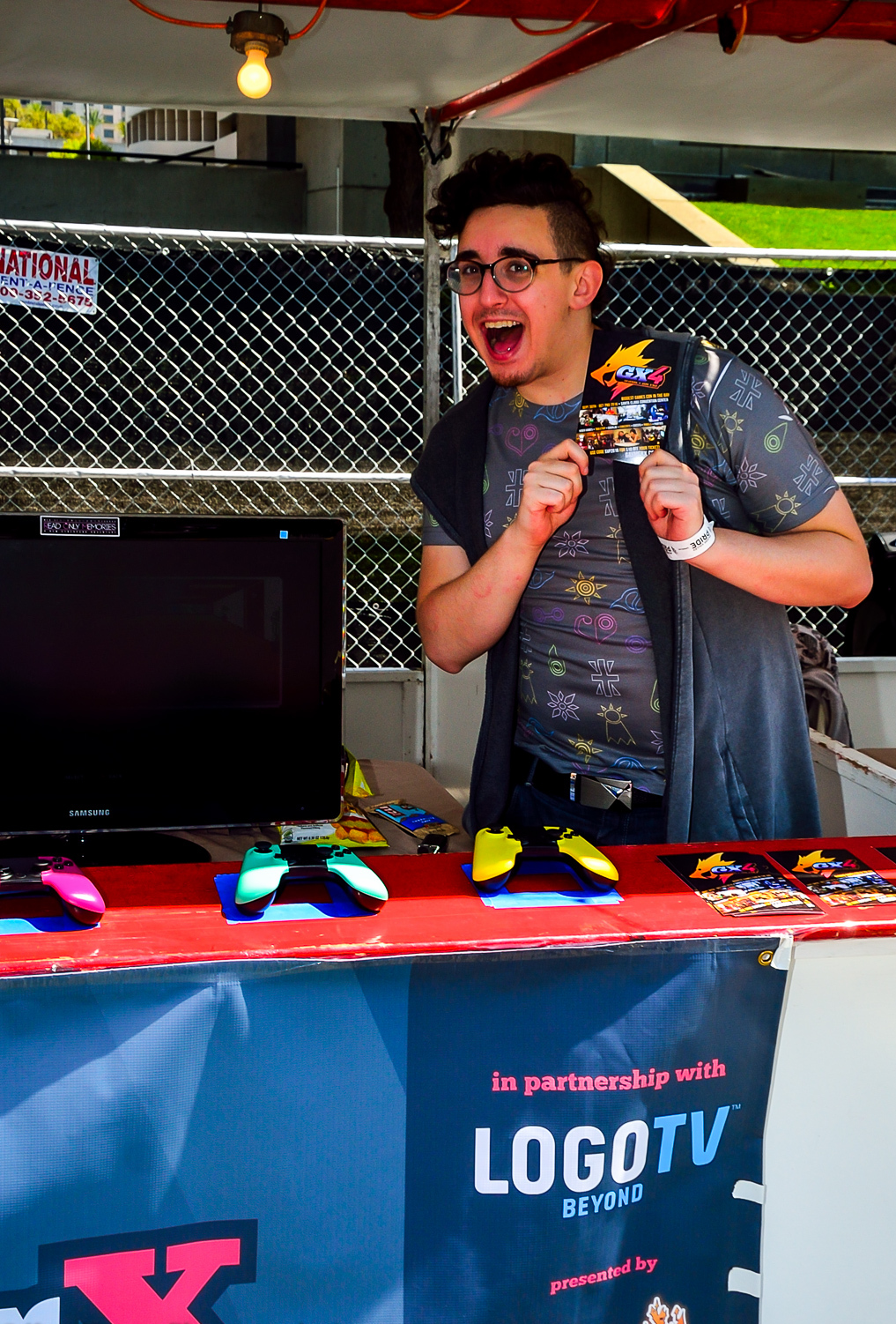
Silicon Valley Pride Parade

Besides the distinction of a "girl gamer" from a "male gamer", there is also a common understanding as stereotype of a "Gaymer." A Gaymer is a depiction of a gay gamer, and someone who identifies their sexual orientation to be a part of the LGBT (gay, bisexual, lesbian, or transgender) community while participating in video games. The concept of Gaymers is a part of two surveys in 2006 and 2009. The 2006 survey took note of the levels of detriment that Gaymers may have experienced, and the 2009 survey kept detail of the content that Gaymers would find to be normalized in video games. Staying the topic of ideas behind gaming and the relationship with the LGBTQ community, it has been noted that video games are starting to develop more characters and depictions of members from this specific community. Some of the topics of these specific LGBTQ-friendly video games include such ideas as coming out stories and queer relationships. These games are also providing the option of character creation with different forms of gender expression along with more LGBTQ romance options. One example of these games in the LGBTQ+ realm of dating would be Dream Daddy: A Dad Dating Simulator, released in 2017. The game had many queer individuals debating, but the overall representation of the game was applauded by many LGBTQ+ people due to its accurate presentation and the way that it provided comfort to people of many sexualities. Having more of these gender- and sexuality-friendly games is providing LGBTQ+ members with a safe space to feel welcome and explore their queerness in a more confident manner.

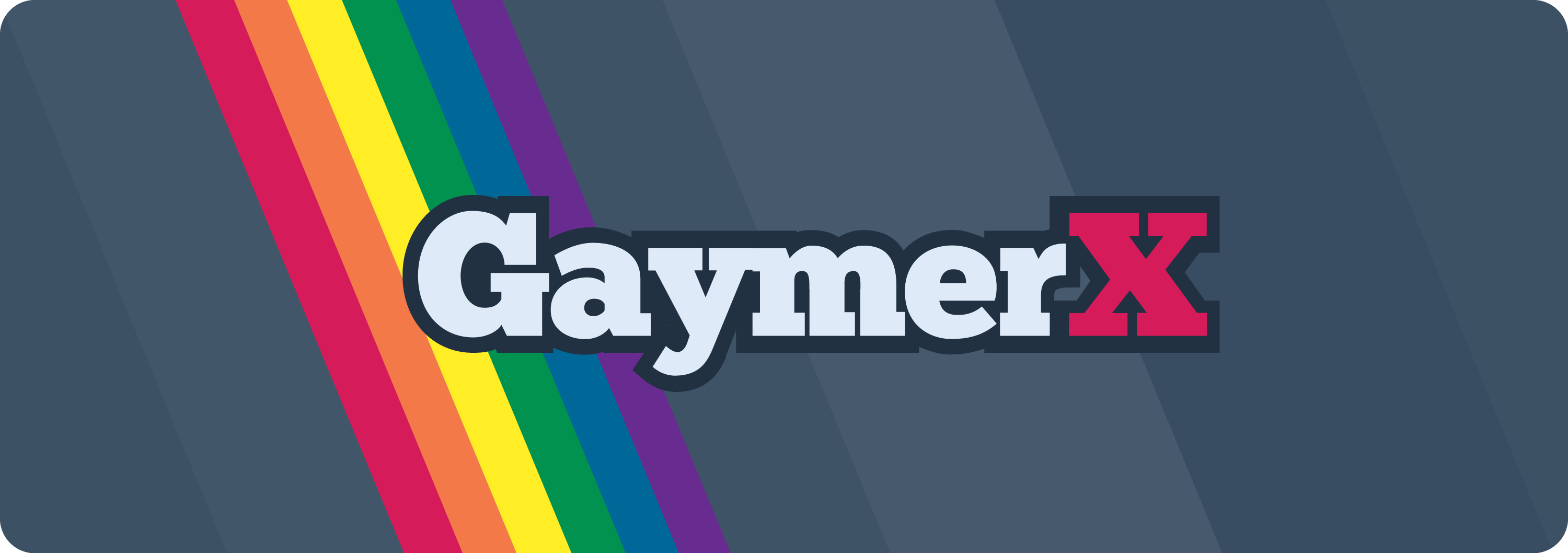
Gaymer Logo for LGBT Gaming Convention

Although the LGBTQ+ gamers are starting to make more of a mark in the gaming world, there are still many disadvantages to this process. Homophobia in the gaming world does tend to take a toll on the problem of an equally shared gaming experience. This is both an issue within the games industry and many areas of the games culture. The brings back the thought of importance for increasing LGBTQ representation in games, especially with such events as GaymerX. There is a study called the online roulette survey that shows that queer gamers are at a disadvantage financially for the fact that the highest earning professional gamers in the LGBTQ+ community bring in less money than popular heterosexual professional gamers. This highlights that not only is there a huge divide between male and female counterparts in the gaming industry, but there also happens to be a great divide when it comes to sexual preference in the gaming world, especially when it comes to the professional gaming scene. Often, tech companies' privilege men's point of view over women's participation in tech and their consumption, which could be seen as vice versa for people of a homosexual and heterosexual identity. The two topics will always hold a big weight in the gaming industry.

=== Dedication spectrum ===
It is common for games media, games industry analysts, and academics to divide gamers into broad behavioral categories. These categories are sometimes separated by level of dedication to gaming, sometimes by primary type of game played, and sometimes by a combination of those and other factors. There is no general consensus on the definitions or names of these categories, though many attempts have been made to formalize them. An overview of these attempts and their common elements follows.

- Newbie: (commonly shortened to "noob", "n00b", or "newb") A slang term for a novice or newcomer to a certain game, or to gaming in general.
- Casual gamer: The term often used for gamers who primarily play casual games, but can also refer to gamers who play less frequently than other gamers. Casual gamers may play games designed for ease of gameplay, or play more involved games in short sessions, or at a slower pace than hardcore gamers. The types of game that casual gamers play vary, and they are less likely to own a dedicated video game console. Notable examples of casual games include The Sims and Nintendogs. Casual gamer demographics vary greatly from those of other video gamers, as the typical casual gamer is older and more predominantly female. Fitness gamers, who play motion-based exercise games, are also seen as casual gamers.
- Core gamer: (also mid-core) A player with a wider range of interests than a casual gamer and is more likely to enthusiastically play different types of games, but without the amount of time spent and sense of competition of a hardcore gamer. The mid-core gamer enjoys games but may not finish every game they buy and is a target consumer. Former Nintendo president Satoru Iwata stated that they designed the Wii U to cater to core gamers who are in between the casual and hardcore categories. A number of theories have been presented regarding the rise in popularity of mid-core games. James Hursthouse, the founder of Roadhouse Interactive, credits the evolution of devices towards tablets and touch-screen interfaces, whereas Jon Radoff of Disruptor Beam compares the emergence of mid-core games to similar increases in media sophistication that have occurred in media such as television.
- Hardcore gamer: Ernest Adams and Scott Kim have proposed classification metrics to distinguish "hardcore gamers" from casual gamers, emphasizing action, competition, complexity, gaming communities, and staying abreast of developments in hardware and software. Others have attempted to draw the distinction based primarily on which platforms a gamer prefers, or to decry the entire concept of delineating casual from hardcore as divisive and vague.

=== Professional gamer ===
Professional gamers generally play video games for prize money or salaries. Usually, such individuals deeply study the game in order to master it and usually to play in competitions like esports. A pro gamer may also be another type of gamer, such as a hardcore gamer, if he or she meets the additional criteria for that gamer type. In countries of Asia, particularly South Korea and China, professional gamers and teams are sponsored by large companies and can earn more than US$100,000 a year. In 2006, Major League Gaming contracted several Halo 2 players including Tom "Tsquared" Taylor and members of Team Final Boss with $250,000 yearly deals. Many professional gamers find that competitions are able to provide a substantial amount of money to support themselves. However, oftentimes, these popular gamers can locate even more lucrative options. One such option is found through online live streaming of their games. These gamers who take time out of their lives to stream make money from their stream, usually through sponsorships with large companies looking for a new audience or donations from their fans just trying to support their favorite streamer. Live streaming often occurs through popular websites such as Twitch and YouTube. Professional gamers with particularly large followings can often bring their fan bases to watch them play on live streams. An example of this is shown through retired professional League of Legends player Wei "CaoMei" Han-Dong. Han-Dong had decided to retire from esports due to his ability to acquire substantially higher pay through live streaming. His yearly salary through the Battle Flag TV live streaming service increased his pay to roughly $800,000 yearly. Live streaming can be seen by many as a truly lucrative way for professional gamers to make money in a way that can also lessen the pressure in the competitive scene. We are seeing a rapid increase in the young video game players wanting to be professional gamers instead of the "pro athlete". The career path of becoming a professional gamer is open for anyone any race, gender, and background. The gaming community now has developed at a much faster rate and now is being considered esports. These more serious gamers are professional gamers; they are individuals that take the average everyday gaming much more seriously and profit from how they perform.

=== Retrogamer ===
A retro gamer is a gamer who prefers to play and collect retro games—older video games and arcade games. They may also be called classic gamers or old-school gamers, which are terms that are more prevalent in the United States. The games can be played on the original hardware, on modern hardware via emulation, or on modern hardware via ports or compilations (though those 'in the hobby' tend toward original hardware and emulation).

=== Classification in taxonomies ===
A number of taxonomies have been proposed which classify gamer types and the aspects they value in games.

The Bartle taxonomy of player types classifies gamers according to their preferred activities within the game:

- Achievers, who like to gain points and overall succeed within the game parameters, collecting all rewards and game badges.
- Explorers, who like to discover all areas within the game, including hidden areas and glitches, and expose all game mechanics.
- Socializers, who prefer to play games for the social aspect, rather than the actual game itself.
- Beaters, who thrive on competition with other players.
- Completionists, who are combinations of the Achiever and Explorer types. They complete every aspect of the game (main story, side quests, achievements) while finding every secret within it.

The MDA framework describes various aspects of the game regarding the basic rules and actions (Mechanics), how they build up during game to develop the gameplay (Dynamics), and what emotional response they convey to the player (Aesthetics). The described esthetics are further classified as Sensation, Fantasy, Narrative, Challenge, Fellowship, Discovery, Expression and Submission. Jesse Schell extends this classification with Anticipation, Schadenfreude, Gift giving, Humour, Possibility, Pride, Purification, Surprise, Thrill, Perseverance and Wonder, and proposes a number of generalizations of differences between how males and females play.

== Avatar ==
Creating an avatar can be one of the first interaction that a potential player makes to identify themselves among the gaming community. An avatar, username, game name, alias, gamer tag, screen name, or handle is a name (usually a pseudonym) adopted by a video gamer, often used as a main preferred identification to the gaming community. Usage of user names is often most prevalent in games with online multiplayer support, or at electronic sport conventions. While some well-known gamers only go by their online handle, a number have adopted to using their handle within their real name typically presented as a middle name, such as Tyler "Ninja" Blevins or Jay "sinatraa" Won.

Similarly, a clan tag is a prefix or suffix added to a name to identify that the gamer is in a clan. Clans are generally a group of gamers who play together as a team against other clans. They are most commonly found in online multi-player games in which one team can face off against another. Clans can also be formed to create loosely based affiliations perhaps by all being fans of the same game or merely gamers who have close personal ties to each other. A team tag is a prefix or suffix added to a name to identify that the gamer is in a team. Teams are generally sub-divisions within the same clan and are regarded within gaming circuits as being a purely competitive affiliation. These gamers are usually in an online league such as the Cyberathlete Amateur League (C.A.L.) and their parent company the Cyberathlete Professional League (C.P.L.) where all grouped players were labeled as teams and not clans.

== Clans and guilds ==
A clan, squad or guild is a group of players that form, usually under an informal 'leader' or administrator. Clans are often formed by gamers with similar interests; many clans or guilds form to connect an 'offline' community that might otherwise be isolated due to geographic, cultural or physical barriers. Some clans are composed of professional gamers, who enter competitive tournaments for cash or other prizes; most, however, are simply groups of like-minded players that band together for a mutual purpose (for example, a gaming-related interest or social group).

== Identity ==
The identity of being a gamer is partly self-determination and partly performativity of characteristics society expects a gamer to embody. These expectations include not only a high level of dedication to playing games, but also preferences for certain types of games, as well as an interest in game-related paraphernalia like clothing and comic books. According to Graeme Kirkpatrick, the "true gamer" is concerned first and foremost with gameplay. The Escapist founder Alexander Macris says a gamer is an enthusiast with greater dedication to games than just playing them, similar in connotation to "cinemaphile". People who play may not identify as gamers because they feel they do not play "enough" to qualify. Social stigma against games has influenced some women and minorities to distance themselves from the term "gamer", even though they may play regularly.

=== Demographics ===
Games are stereotypically associated with young males, but the diversity of the audience has been steadily increasing over time. This stereotype exists even among a majority of women who play video games regularly. Among players using the same category of device (e.g., console or phone), patterns of play are largely the same between men and women. Diversity is driven in part by new hardware platforms. Expansion of the audience was catalyzed by Nintendo's efforts to reach new demographics. Market penetration of smartphones with gaming capabilities further expanded the audience, since in contrast to consoles or high-end PCs, mobile phone gaming requires only devices that non-gamers are likely to already own.

While 48% of women in the United States report having played a video game, only 6% identify as gamers, compared to 15% of men who identify as gamers. This rises to 9% among women aged 18–29, compared to 33% of men in that age group. Half of female PC gamers in the U.S. consider themselves to be core or hardcore gamers. Connotations of "gamer" with sexism on the fringe of gaming culture has caused women to be less willing to adopt the label.

Racial minorities responding to Pew Research were more likely to describe themselves as gamers, with 19% of Hispanics identifying as gamers, compared to 11% of African Americans and 7% of whites. The competitive fighting game scene is noted as particularly racially diverse and tolerant. This is attributed to its origin in arcades, where competitors met face to face and the barrier to entry was merely a quarter. Only 4% of those aged 50 and over identified as gamers.

=== Casualization ===
Casualization is a trend in video games towards simpler games appealing to larger audiences, especially women or the elderly. Some developers, hoping to attract a broader audience, simplify or remove aspects of gameplay in established genres and franchises. Compared to seminal titles like DOOM, more recent mass-market action games like the Call of Duty series are less sensitive to player choice or skill, approaching the status of interactive movies.

The trend towards casual games is decried by some self-identified gamers who emphasize gameplay, meaning the activities that one undertakes in a game. According to Brendan Keogh, these are inherently masculine activities such as fighting and exerting dominance. He further says that games women prefer are more passive experiences, and male gamers deride the lack of interactivity in these games because of this association with femininity. Belying these trends, games including The Sims or Minecraft have some of the largest audiences in the industry while also being very complex. According to Joost van Dreunen of SuperData Research, girls who play Minecraft are "just as 'hardcore' as the next guy over who plays Counter-Strike". Dreunen says being in control of a game's environment appeals equally to boys and girls. Leigh Alexander argued that appealing to women does not necessarily entail reduced difficulty or complexity.

== See also ==
- Entertainment Consumers Association
- Esports
- Gamers Outreach Foundation
- Going Cardboard (documentary)
- List of gaming topics
- Player (game)
- Video game addiction
