= Kirsten Sehnbruch =

German economics professor

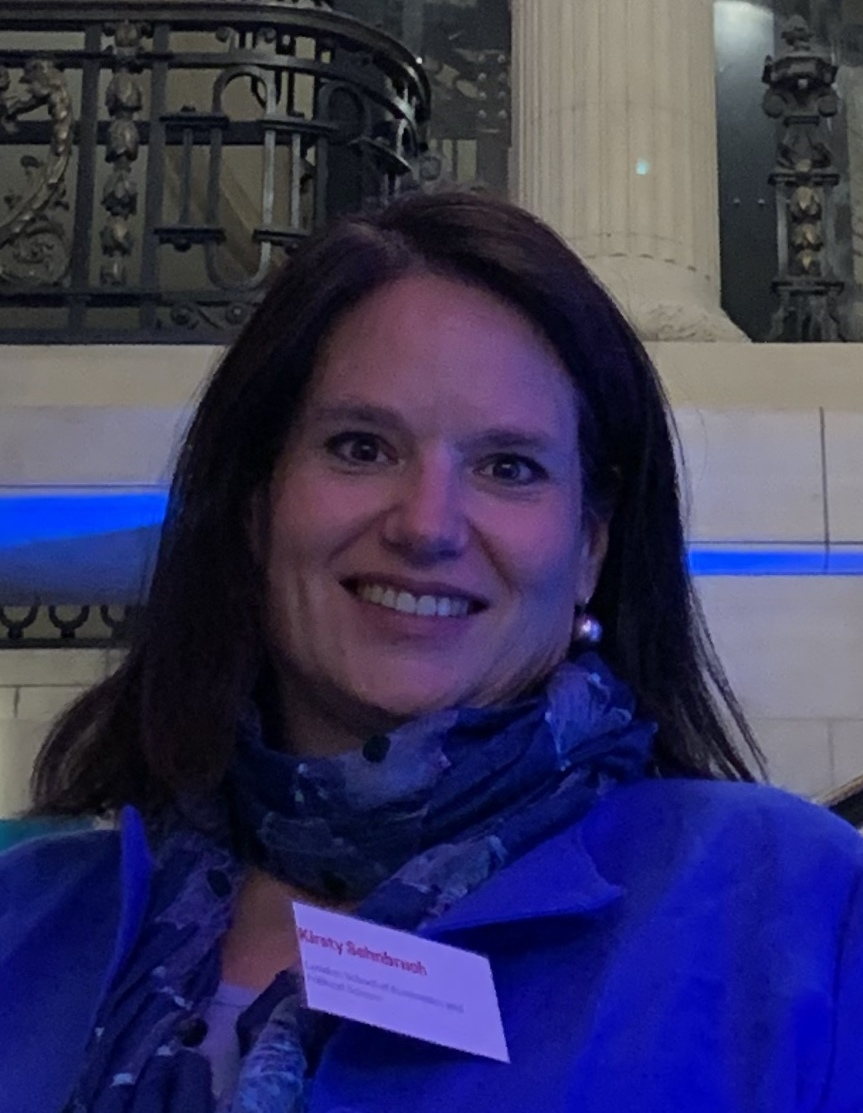
- Sehnbruch in 2019
- Born: Oberhausen, Germany
- Occupation: Academic researcher

Academic background
- Education: Cambridge University
- Website: quality-employment.org

Kirsten Sehnbruch is a British Academy Global Professor and Distinguished Policy Fellow at the International Inequalities Institute at the London School of Economics and Political Science. Sehnbruch is known for her work on conceptualising and measuring the quality of employment, particularly in developing countries. Her research subjects include quality of employment, multidimensional indicators, Latin American labour markets, labour relations, Chilean politics and public policy.

== Research ==
Sehnbruch has consistently worked on the subject of the quality of employment. Her work argues that employment conditions such as income levels, job stability, occupational status, social security contributions, and access to quality vocational training are extremely important to an individual's capabilities and well-being. Still, these conditions are often neglected by labour market experts and policy makers, who tend to focus mostly on the quantity of available jobs. Influenced by Amartya Sen's capability approach and by work on multidimensional poverty indicators undertaken by the Oxford Human Development Initiative and the United Nations Development Programme, Sehnbruch argues that conceptualising and measuring the quality of employment, preferably by means of a composite indicator, is essential to attracting more policy attention to employment issues in developing countries.

In addition to her work on the quality of employment, Sehnbruch has written many articles on Chilean politics and public policy. Her 2013 book, co-edited with Peter Siavelis, Democratic Chile: The Politics and Policies of a Historic Coalition, 1990–2010, examines how the political and institutional legacy of the Pinochet dictatorship shaped both the political and policy development led by the Concertación between Chile's transition to democracy, and the first government of Michelle Bachelet after which the coalition lost the elections to the centre-right candidate Sebastián Piñera.

From 2011 to 2017, Sehnbruch led the team of researchers from the University of Chile for NOPOOR project, founded by the 7th Framework Programme (FP7) of the European Commission.

In 2013, she coordinated a proposal for a FONDAP research hub on social conflict and cohesion that was funded by the Chilean National Research Council (Conicyt) and later became known as El Centro para el Estudio de Conflictos y Cohesión Social (COES). Sehnbruch then served as a founding board member of the centre between 2013 and 2019.

In 2018, Sehnbruch was awarded a four-year British Academy Global Professorship to study The Quality of Employment (QoE) in Middle Income Countries.

== Biography ==
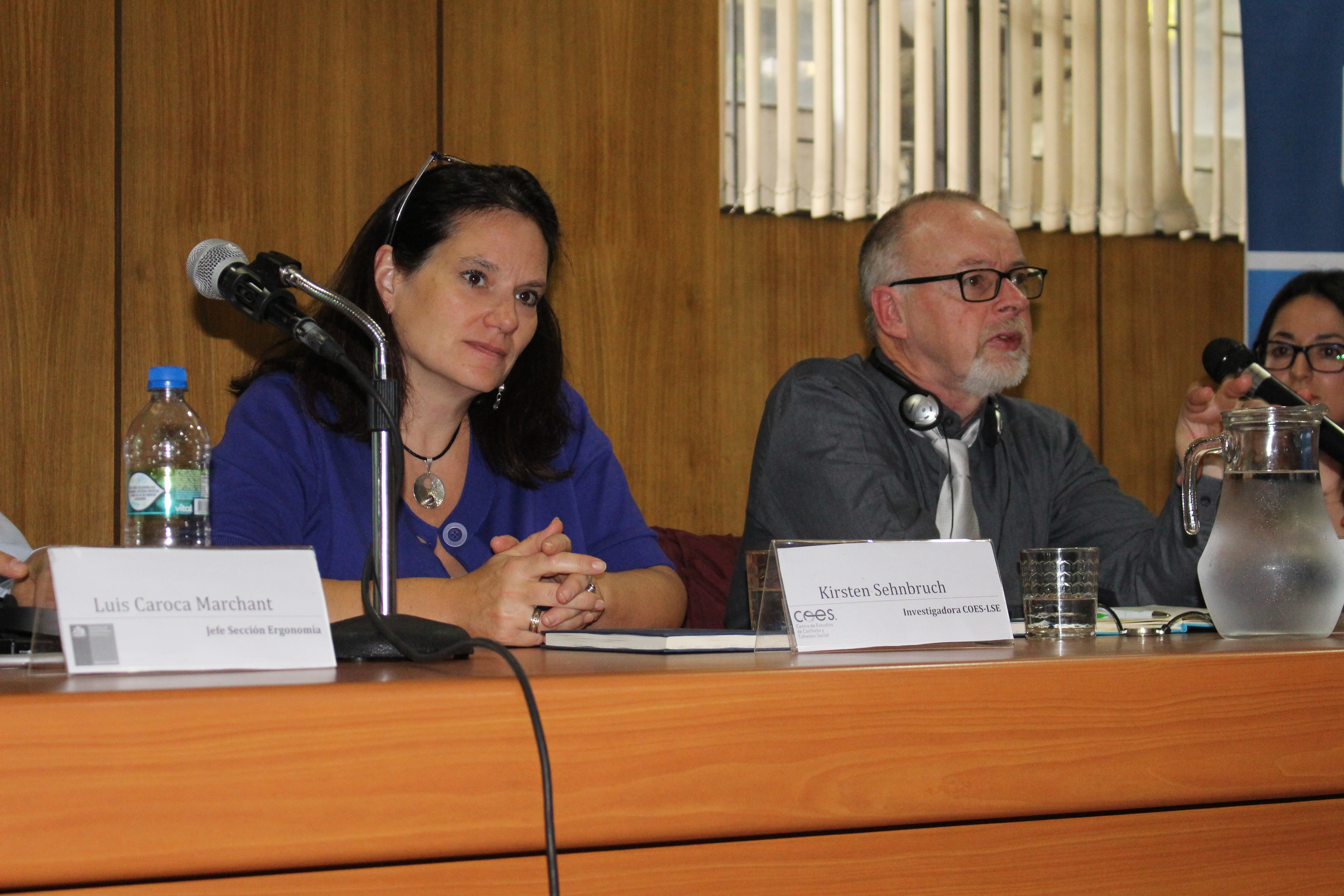
Sehnbruch and Brendan Burchell presenting on the quality and future of employment in FACSO

Sehnbruch was born in Oberhausen, Germany, and raised in London (where she attended to the German School London), and in Kirchen, Germany. Sehnbruch studied modern and medieval languages at Jesus College, Cambridge. During her undergraduate degree, she worked as a trainee auditor for Price Waterhouse in Buenos Aires, where she gained first-hand experience of development issues. After graduating from Cambridge, she worked as an equity analyst for Goldman Sachs Asset Management in London.

In 1997, she moved to Brussels to work at the European Commission on the Mexico Desk of the Directorate-General for External Relations with the team that negotiated the Global Agreement on Free Trade with Mexico. That year, she also returned to the University of Cambridge to undertake a Masters in Philosophy (MPhil) in Latin American Studies, focussing on economics and sociology.

She subsequently undertook a PhD in social and political sciences at the University of Cambridge, which analysed the quality of employment in the Chilean labour market, and was published as the book The Chilean Labor Market: A Key to understanding Latin American Labor Markets by Palgrave Macmillan in 2006.

Following her PhD, Sehnbruch worked as a lecturer and senior scholar at the University of California at Berkeley. In 2009, she moved to Chile where she worked at the Faculty of Economics of the Universidad de Chile and as director of the Institute for Public Policy at the Universidad Diego Portales. During this time, Sehnbruch was instrumental in co-ordinating a significant grant from the Chilean government to set up a research hub on social conflict and cohesion (Centro de Estudios de Conflicto y Cohesión Social), based at the University of Chile and the Catholic University of Chile. COES undertakes multidisciplinary research on subjects related to social conflict and cohesion in Chile. It brings together a group of more than 50 researchers from all social science disciplines as well as a network of international researchers from around the world. Sehnbruch was a member of the COES board for five years.

Sehnbruch has consistently worked on the subject of the quality of employment in developing countries. Her work conceptualises and measures the quality of employment using the theoretical framework of Amartya Sen's capability approach and the empirical methodology developed by Sabina Alkire and James Foster. Her work argues that measuring the performance of a developing country's labour market by focusing only on the quantity of jobs, as expressed by its unemployment rate, is as simplistic as measuring a country's level of development only by its GDP per capita level. More sophisticated, multidimensional measures are required that focus on the quality of jobs.

== Media ==
For several years, Sehnbruch wrote a blog for one of Chile's principal newspapers, La Tercera. She maintains an active profile in the Chilean press, but has also written for The Guardian, The Washington Post's Monkey Cage, Open Democracy and the Inter-American Dialogue.

== Selected publications ==
=== Refereed journal articles ===
- Sehnbruch, K., González, P., Apablaza, M., Méndez Pineda, R., & Arriagada, V. (2020). The Quality of Employment (QoE) in nine Latin American countries: A multidimensional perspective. World Development, 127, 104738. doi:10.1016/j.worlddev.2019.104738
- Madero-Cabib, I., Biehl, A., Sehnbruch, K., Calvo, E., & Bertranou, F. (2019). Private Pension Systems Built on Precarious Foundations: A Cohort Study of Labor-Force Trajectories in Chile. Research on Aging, 41(10), 961–987. doi:10.1177/0164027519874687
- Piasna, A., Burchell, B., & Sehnbruch, K. (2019). Job quality in European employment policy: one step forward, two steps back? The European Review of Labour and Research, 25(2), 165–180. doi:10.1177/1024258919832213
- Sehnbruch, K., Carranza, R., & Prieto, J. (2019). The Political Economy of Unemployment Insurance based on Individual Savings Accounts: Lessons from Chile. Development and Change, 50(4), 948–975. doi:10.1111/dech.12457
- Sehnbruch, K. (2017). The Impact of the Chilean Earthquake of 2010: Challenging the Capabilities of the Neoliberal State. Latin American Perspectives, 44(4), 4–9. doi:10.1177/0094582X17705859
- Sehnbruch, K., Agloni, N., Imilan, W., & Sanhueza, C. (2017). Social policy responses of the Chilean state to the earthquake and tsunami of 2010. Latin American Perspectives, 44(4), 24–40. doi:10.1177/0094582X16648955
- Ocampo, J., & Sehnbruch, K. (2015). Introduction: Quality of employment in Latin America. International Labour Review, 154(2), 165–170. doi:10.1111/j.1564-913X.2015.00237.x
- Ruiz-Tagle, J., & Sehnbruch, K. (2015). More but not better jobs in Chile? The fundamental importance of open-ended contracts. International Labour Review, 154(2), 227–252. doi:10.1111/j.1564-913X.2015.00240.x
- Ramos, J., Sehnbruck, K., & Weller, J. (2015). The quality of employment in Latin America: Theory and evidence. International Labour Review, 154(2), 171–194. doi:10.1111/j.1564-913X.2015.00238.x
- Sehnbruch, K., Burchell, B., Agloni, N., & Piasna, A. (2015). Human Development and Decent Work: Why some Concepts Succeed and Others Fail to Make an Impact. Development and Change, 46(2), 197–224. doi:10.1111/dech.12149
- Burchell, B., Sehnbruch, K., Piasna, A., & Agloni, N. (2014). The quality of employment and decent work: Definitions, Methodologies, and ongoing debates. Cambridge Journal of Economics, 38(2), 459–477. doi:10.1093/cje/bet067
- Sehnbruch, K. (2012). Do the Poor Count? Democratic Institutions and Accountability in the Context of Poverty By Michelle Taylor-Robinson Penn State Press. 2010. 223 pages. $69.95 cloth, $34.95 paper, Social Forces, 93(2), Page e44. doi:10.1093/sf/sos107
- Dresdner Cid, J., & Sehnbruck, K. (2010). El Impacto del Sismo 2010 sobre el Mercado Laboral de la Región del Bío Bío. Revista Sociedad Hoy, 19, 71–96.
- Sehnbruch, K. (2006). Unemployment Insurance or Individual Savings Accounts: Can Chile’S New Scheme Serve as a Model for Other Developing Countries? International Social Security Review, 59(1), 27–48. doi:10.1111/j.1468-246X.2006.00232.x

=== Books ===
- Sehnbruch, K., & Siavelis, P. (2014). El balance: Política y políticas de la Concertación 1990–2010 . Santiago: Catalonia
- Sehnbruch, K., & Siavelis, P. (2014). Democratic Chile: The Politics and Policies of a Historic Coalition, 1990–2010. Lynne Rienner Publishers, Inc.
- Sehnbruch, K. (2006). The Chilean Labor Market: A Key to Understanding Latin American Labor Markets. New York and Basingstoke: Palgrave Macmillan.
