= Cultural Sociology (journal) =

- Discipline: Sociology
- Language: English
- Edited by: Marcus Morgan and Christopher Thorpe

Publication details
- History: 2007-present
- Publisher: SAGE Publications
- Frequency: Quarterly
- Open access: Hybrid
- Impact factor: 1.792 (2019)

Standard abbreviations
- ISO 4: Cult. Sociol.

Indexing
- ISSN: 1749-9755 (print); 1749-9763 (web)
- LCCN: 2007212175
- OCLC no.: 73689458

Links
- Journal homepage; Current Issue; All Issues

Cultural Sociology is a peer-reviewed academic journal published jointly by the British Sociological Association and SAGE Publications. The journal includes sociological analysis of culture from a range of theoretical and methodological positions, and from a variety of national contexts. Cultural Sociology publishes sociologically informed work concerned with cultural processes and artifacts, broadly defined.

Although focused on sociological contributions to cultural analysis, articles include dialogue between sociology and other cognate fields such as cultural studies, gender studies, postcolonial studies, art history, history, literary and film studies, and human geography.

== Abstracting and indexing ==
Cultural Sociology is abstracted and indexed in the Social Sciences Citation Index. According to the Journal Citation Reports, the journal has a 2019 impact factor of 1.792, ranking it 84 out of 149 journals in the category "Sociology".
