= Sara Arber =

British sociologist and Professor

Sara Arber FRSA FBA FAcSS
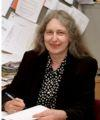
- Born: 19 March 1949 (age 77); Chingford, United Kingdom
- Education: London School of Economics; University of Michigan; University of Surrey
- Known for: Sociology of Ageing and Gender; Inequalities in Health; Sociology of Sleep
- Scientific career
- Fields: Sociology
- Workplaces: University of Surrey

Sara Lynne Arber FRSA FBA FAcSS (born 19 March 1949) is a British sociologist and Professor at University of Surrey. Arber has previously held the position of President of the British Sociological Association (1999–2001) and vice-president of the European Sociological Association (2005–2007). She is well known for her work on gender and ageing, inequalities in health and has pioneered research in the new field of sociology of sleep.

== Career ==
Arber was born on 19 March 1949 in Chingford, Essex, England, and raised in Thames Ditton, Surrey. She graduated from the London School of Economics with a First in Sociology 1972. She went onto postgraduate study at University of London and University of Michigan before joining the Sociology Department of the University of Surrey as a lecturer in 1974. She obtained her PhD by publications from the University of Surrey in 1991. She was made a Professor there in 1994, she acted as Head of Department (1996–2002) and Head of the School of Human Sciences (2001–2004).

She has served on various committees of the Economic and Social Research Council (ESRC) since 1984 and was a member of the Grants Assessment Panel (2008–2012). As well as presidency of the British Sociological Association, she has also acted as President of the International Sociological Association Research Committee on Sociology of Ageing (2006–2010). She was a member of the 2014 REF (Research Excellence Framework) Panel for Sociology.

== Work ==
=== Ageing and gender ===
One of Arber's main areas of research has been in the field of the Sociology of Ageing and how gender inequalities develop in later life. Much of the seminal work in this discipline was developed together with Jay Ginn, such as Connecting Gender and Ageing in 1995 which won the Age Concern prize for best book on Ageing in 1996 and Gender and Ageing: Changing Roles and Relationships. In 2000 she established and is co-director of the Centre for Research on Ageing and Gender (CRAG) at University of Surrey.

She is co-editor of Contemporary Grandparenting: Changing Family Relationships in Global Contexts.

=== Sleep ===
Sara has been pioneering empirical research on the sociology of sleep since 2001. Recent research was done through SomnIA (Sleep in Ageing), a four-year collaborative research project including researchers from sociology, psychology, neuroendocrinology, engineering, nursing and medicine. The SomnIA research covered various aspects of quality of sleep including amongst older people in care homes. Professor Arber has analysed survey data on the sleeping habits of 14,000 households finding that one in 10 people are using medication to assist in getting to sleep, and women have more problems getting to sleep than men. She has also researched "The biomedical and sociological effects of sleep restriction" for an EU Marie Curie research project focused on the effects of lack of sleep on health and wellbeing.

== Honours ==
In 2000, Arber was elected into Academician of the Academy of the Social Science (AcSS): in 2014, after a change in name, she became a Fellow of the Academy of the Social Science (FAcSS). In 2008, she was elected a Fellow of the British Academy (FBA), the United Kingdom's national academy for the humanities and social sciences. In 2012, she was elected a Fellow of the Royal Society of Arts (FRSA).

Sara was awarded the British Society of Gerontology Outstanding Achievement Award 2011 for her research on ageing. In 2017, Arber received the British Sociological Association Distinguished Service to British Sociology award, given annually to an "outstanding individual who has contributed most to the discipline by leading an extraordinary life as a sociologist".

== Selected works ==
- Arber, Sara; Ginn, Jay (1991). Gender and Later Life. Sage Publications. ISBN 0-8039-8397-2.
- Arber, Sara; Ginn, Jay (1995). Connecting Gender and Ageing. Open University Press. ISBN 0-335-19470-2.
- Arber, Sara; Attias-Donfut, Claudine (2000). The Myth of Generational Conflict: Family and State in Ageing Societies. Routledge. ISBN 0-415-20770-3.
- Arber, Sara; Davidson, Kate (2003). Ginn, Jay (ed.). Gender and Ageing: Changing Roles and Relationships. Open University Press. ISBN 0-335-21320-0.
- Arber, Sara; Timonen, Virpi (2012). Contemporary Grandparenting: Changing Family Relationships in Global Contexts. Policy Press. ISBN 978-1-84742-967-4.

Academic offices
Preceded by David Morgan	President of the British Sociological Association; 1999–2001	Succeeded by JohnScott
