= John David Brewer =

Irish-British sociologist

John Brewer
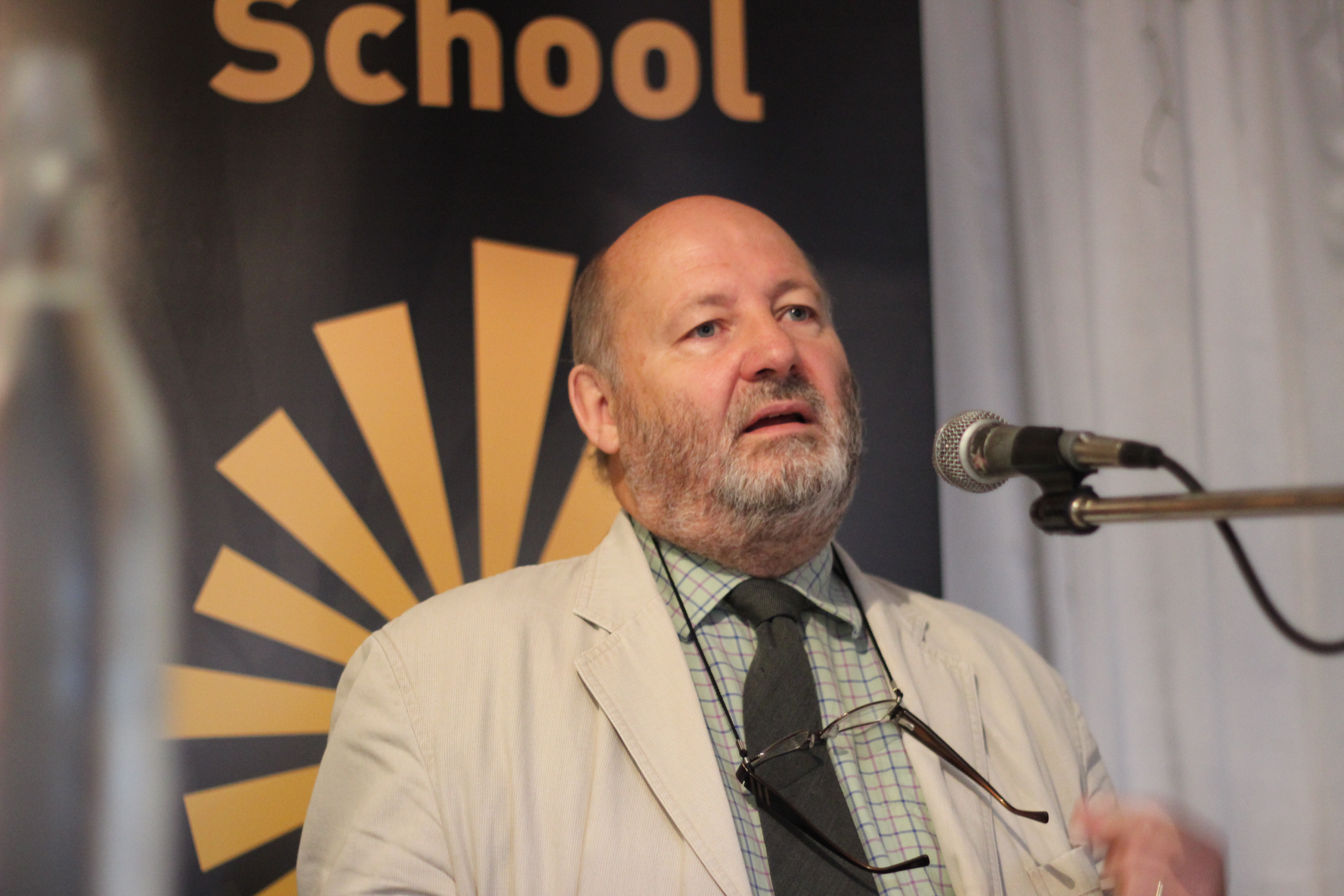
- Brewer in 2015
- Born: John David Brewer; 1951 (age 74–75); Ludlow, Shropshire, England
- Education: University of Nottingham; University of Birmingham
- Employers: University of Aberdeen (2004–13); Queen's University Belfast (2013–present); Stellenbosch University (2017–present)
- Known for
- Writing career
- Subjects: Global peace; transformative justice; peace processes; policing

John David Brewer HDSSc, MRIA, FRSE, FAcSS, FRSA (born 1951) is an Irish-British sociologist who was the former President of the British Sociological Association (2009–2012), and was Professor of Post Conflict Studies in the Senator George J. Mitchell Institute for Global Peace, Security and Justice at Queen's University Belfast (2013–2023), and is now emeritus Professor in the Mitchell Institute. He was awarded the 2023 Distinguished Service Prize by the British Sociological Association for service to British sociology. He is also Honorary Professor Extraordinary, Stellenbosch University (2017–present) and Honorary Professor of Sociology, Warwick University (2021–present). He was formerly Sixth-Century Professor of Sociology at the University of Aberdeen (2004–2013). He is a member of the United Nations Roster of Global Experts for his work on peace processes (2010–present). He was awarded an honorary doctorate in 2012 from Brunel University for services to social science.

== Background ==
Born in Ludlow, Shropshire, England, in 1951, he lived in nearby Cleobury Mortimer until he went to university. He was Head Boy at Lacon Childe School in Cleobury Mortimer and won the British Sugar Corporation Prize for his A-Levels at Kidderminster College of Further Education. He played football and cricket for Shropshire schoolboys. He has taught in numerous universities in the UK, United States and Australia.

== Academic work ==
Brewer was educated at the Universities of Nottingham and Birmingham. He was Professor of Sociology, and former Head of Department of Sociology (2004–2007), at Aberdeen University, moving from Queen's University, Belfast in July 2004, to which he returned in 2013 as its first Professor of Post Conflict Studies. He was Head of the School of Sociology and Social Policy at Queen's between 1993 and 2002. Brewer taught at the University of East Anglia before moving to Queen's in 1981. He has held visiting appointments at Yale University (1989), St John's College, Oxford (1992), Corpus Christi College, Cambridge (2002) and the Research School of Social Sciences at the Australian National University (2003). He was awarded a Leverhulme Trust Research Fellowship in 2007–2008.

Brewer is a Fellow of the Royal Society of Arts (elected 1998), a Fellow of the Academy of Social Sciences (elected 2003), a Member of the Royal Irish Academy (elected 2004), then only the third sociologist to be elected in the academy's 217-year history, and a Fellow of the Royal Society of Edinburgh (elected 2008).

He has been Chair of the British Sociological Association (2004–2006), President (2009–2012), a member of the National Committee for Economics and Social Science of the Royal Irish Academy (1997–1999), and a board member of the ESRC's Training and Development Board (2005–2007). Brewer has been a member of the International Assessment Panel of the Irish Research Council for the Humanities and Social Sciences (2002–2007), and sat on its Governing Council (2008–2012). He was also a member of the ESRC's Virtual Research College (2005–2010). He sat on the Governing Council of the Irish Research Council (2012–2015) and the Academy of Social Sciences in the UK (2012–2015). In 2001, he became a member of the Institute of Learning and Teaching in Higher Education. In 2010 he was appointed to the United Nations' Roster of Global Experts for his expertise on peacebuilding. In total, he has earned grant income to the value of £6.4 million. Most recently he was awarded £1.26 million from the Leverhulme Trust to undertake a five-year study of compromise amongst victims of communal conflict.

== Writings ==
Brewer is the editor of Can South Africa Survive and Restructuring South Africa, both with Macmillan, and co-editor of The Sociology of Compromise after Conflict (Palgrave); Public Value (Routledge) and the A-Z of Social Research with Sage. Brewer in a variety of journals. Brewer is also the Series Editor for the Palgrave Studies in Compromise after Conflict Book Series and Co-Editor of the Bristol University Press Book Series on Public Sociology

Brewer is author and co-author of sixteen books including:

- Brewer, John (1986). After Soweto: An Unfinished Journey. Oxford: Clarendon Press. ISBN 978-0198274803.
- Brewer, John (1991). Inside the RUC. Oxford: Clarendon Press. ISBN 978-0198278467.
- Brewer, John (1994). Black and Blue: Policing in South Africa. Oxford: Oxford University Press. ISBN 978-0198273820.
- Brewer, John (1994). Restructuring South Africa. London: Palgrave Macmillan. ISBN 978-1-349-23294-9.
- Brewer, John; Lockhart, Bill; Rodgers, Paula (1997). Crime in Ireland, 1945-95. Oxford: Clarendon Press. ISBN 9780198265702.
- Brewer, John; Higgins, Gareth (1998). Anti-Catholicism in Northern Ireland, 1600-1998. London: Macmillan. ISBN 978-0-333-74635-6.
- Brewer, John (2000). Ethnography. Buckingham: Open University Press. ISBN 978-0335202683.
- Brewer, John (2003). C. Wright Mills and the Ending of Violence. London: Palgrave Macmillan. ISBN 978-1-349-42139-8.
- Brewer, John (2010). Peace Processes: A Sociological Approach. Cambridge: Polity Press. ISBN 978-0745647777.
- Brewer, John; Higgins, Gareth; Teeney, Francis (2011). Religion, Civil Society, and Peace in Northern Ireland. Oxford: Oxford University Press. ISBN 978-0198702078.
- Brewer, John (2013). The Public Value of the Social Sciences: An Interpretive Essay. London: Bloomsbury. ISBN 9781780931746.

Academic offices
Preceded by Sue Scott	President of the British Sociological Association; 2009–2012	Succeeded by John Holmwood
