= Percy Cohen =

South African-born British social anthropologist and sociologist

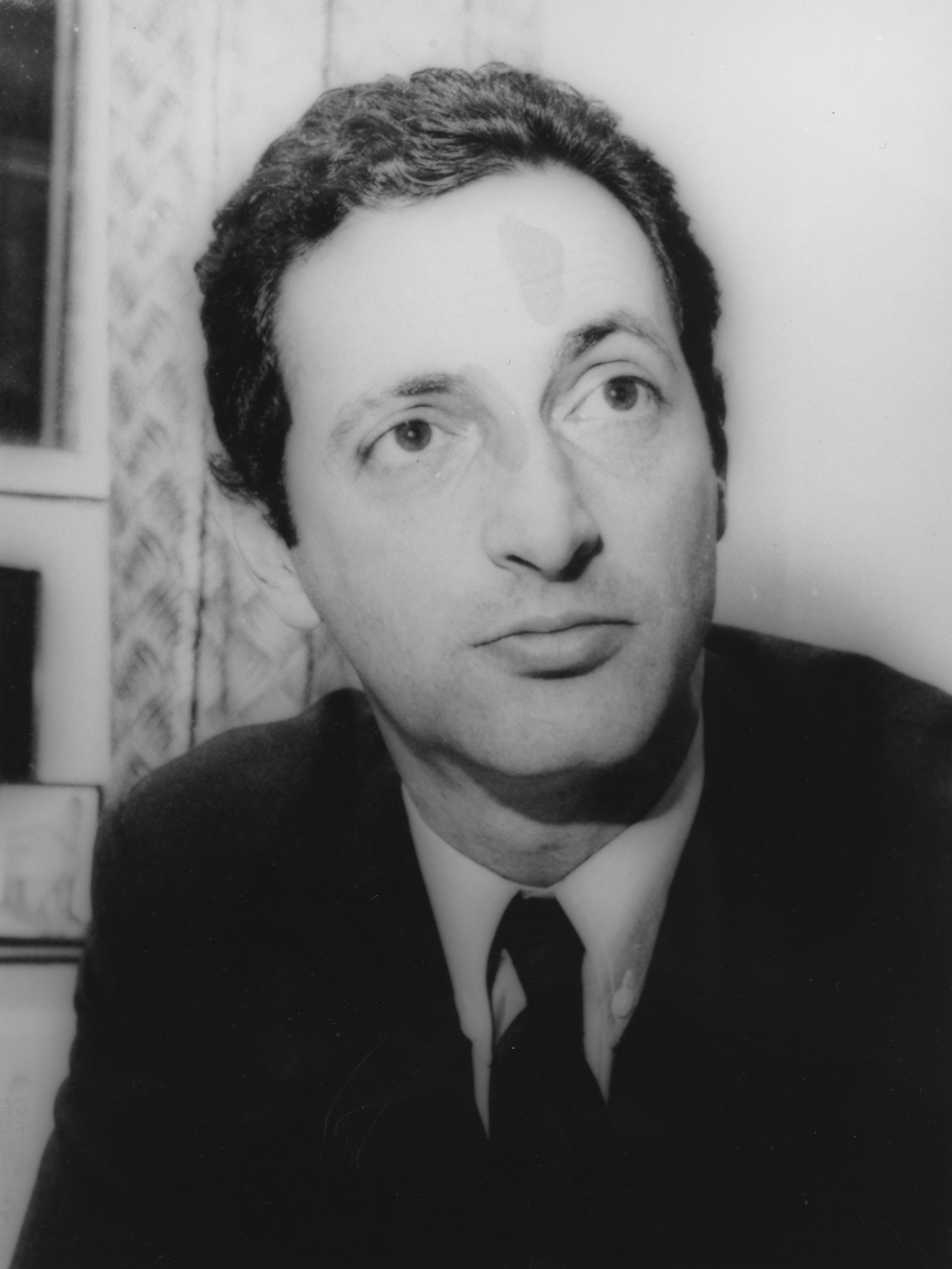
Cohen in the 1970s

Percy Saul Cohen (6 August 1928 – September 1999) was a South African-born British social anthropologist and sociologist.

Cohen was born in Durban, South Africa, on 6 August 1928. Cohen earned his first undergraduate degree at the University of the Witwatersrand. He arrived in the United Kingdom in 1948 to enrol at the London School of Economics, where he earned a BSc (Econ) degree in social anthropology. Cohen continued graduate study in the subject at the same institution until 1960. His doctoral thesis, awarded in 1962, was on Leadership and politics amongst Israeli Yemenis. Upon completing his graduate degree, Cohen served as lecturer in sociology at the University of Leicester until 1965. Cohen was subsequently made a lecturer of sociology at the London School of Economics. He was named a reader in 1967, and appointed professor in 1971. Cohen held a personal chair until retirement in 1991. He was a member of the editorial board of The British Journal of Sociology between 1975 and 1990. From 1982 to 1988, Cohen served as the journal's chief editor.

Cohen was married to Ruth, a ballet dancer he met in Israel while doing research at the Hebrew University in Jerusalem. They had three children, He died in September 1999 in London.
