= Michael Banton =

British social scientist

- Born: 8 September 1926
- Died: 22 May 2018 (aged 91)
- Occupations: social scientist, known primarily for his
- Known for: publications on racial and ethnic relations, the first editor of Sociology

Michael Parker Banton CMG, FRAI (8 September 1926 – 22 May 2018) was a British social scientist, known primarily for his publications on racial and ethnic relations. He was also the first editor of Sociology (1966-1969).

== Education ==
Banton attended King Edward's School, Birmingham.

== Academic contribution ==
After graduating from the London School of Economics in 1950, Banton conducted research on the settlement of New Commonwealth immigrants in the East End of London for which he received a PhD from the University of Edinburgh, from where he also gained a D.Sc. in inter-group relations in 1964. Here he studied under Kenneth Little at the Anthropology department which Banton noted was called "Negroes in Britain Industry". Banton remained at the department and produced three books under Little's supervision: subsequently wrote books about the settlement of rural immigrants in Freetown, Sierra Leone, and on the behaviour of the white British towards New Commonwealth immigrants. His book The Policeman in the Community, a comparative study of policing in Scotland and the United States, was the first book-length sociological study of the police.

Banton became best known for his book Race Relations (1967), which summarised contemporary social science knowledge of that field. This phase of his writing concluded with a volume, The Idea of Race, in which he introduced into the English language the concept of racialization as a process by which the idea of race as a physical category was socially utilized to organise perceptions of the populations of the world. Up to this point his work reflected sociological orthodoxy. For the next forty-plus years his publication energies focused increasingly on this subject as he turned out a succession of studies devoted to defining the study of race relations as a discipline. Banton's particular approach led to a long-running debate with John Rex. Other protagonists include Robert Miles who in 1982 published Racism and Migrant Labour.

Starting in 1976, Banton's criticisms of that orthodoxy strengthened. In Racial and Ethnic Competition (1983) he advanced a rational choice theory. The book ended with a discussion of what constituted 'good' racial relations; it concluded that good racial relations would be ethnic relations. He has been critical of accounts of majority-minority relations in Europe that interpret them in the light of conceptions conventional in the USA.

Recalling Max Weber's statement that he became a sociologist 'in order to put an end to the mischievous enterprise which still operates with collectivist concepts' Banton has observed that 'ethnic group' is a collectivist concept. There are ethnic categories; those who are assigned to an ethnic category may come to form a group, but do not necessarily do so. From this starting point he has developed a theory of social categories.

Whereas Banton has been much concerned with the improvement of concepts and theories in this field, he has also written on measures for the reduction of racial discrimination. He served as an elected member of the United Nations Committee on the Elimination of Racial Discrimination from 1986 to 2001 and as its chairman for 1996–98.

== Career ==
Banton was Lecturer, and subsequently Reader, in Social Anthropology, University of Edinburgh, 1954–65, and professor of Sociology, University of Bristol, 1965–92. He was President of the Royal Anthropological Institute of Great Britain and Ireland 1987–89, and President of the Sociology section, (1970–71) and the Anthropology section, (1985–86) within the British Association for the Advancement of Science. He was President of the Ethnic, Race and Minority Relations section of the International Sociological Association 1990–94, and Director of the Social Science Research Council Research Unit on Ethnic Relations, 1970–78. He was the first editor of Sociology, 1967–70.

== Death ==
Banton died in May 2018 at the age of 91.

== Books ==
- The Coloured Quarter (Cape, 1955)
- West African City (OUP, 1957)
- White and Coloured (Cape, 1959)
- The Policeman in the Community (Tavistock, 1964)
- Roles (Tavistock, 1965)
- Race Relations (Tavistock, 1967)
- Racial Minorities (Fontana, 1972)
- Police-Community Relations (Collins, 1973)
- The Race Concept co-author Jonathan Harwood (Praeger, 1975)
- Banton, M (1978) [1977]. The idea of race (paperback). Boulder: Westview Press. ISBN 978-0-89158-719-4.
- Racial and Ethnic Competition (CUP, 1983)
- Promoting Racial Harmony (CUP, 1985)
- Investigating Robbery (Gower, 1985)
- Racial Theories (CUP, 1987, second edition 1997)
- Racial Consciousness (Longman, 1988)
- Discrimination (Open UP, 1994)
- International Action against Racial Discrimination (OUP, 1996)
- Ethnic and Racial Consciousness (Longman, 1997)
- The International Politics of Race (Polity, 2002).
- Banton, M (2015). What We Know About Race and Ethnicity (hardback). New York/Oxford: Berghahn Books. ISBN 978-1-78238-603-2.

== Selected articles ==
- Banton, M. (2000). "Ethnic Conflict". Sociology. 34 (3): 481. doi:10.1177/S0038038500000304. S2CID 220672922.
- 'Decision-taking in the Committee on the Elimination of Racial Discrimination' pp 55–78 in Philip Alston & James Crawford, editors, The Future of UN Human Rights Treaty Monitoring. 2000 Cambridge: Cambridge University Press.
- 'Historical and Contemporary Modes of Racialization' pp. 51–68 in Racialization: Studies in Theory and Practice, edited by Karim Murji and John Solomos. 2005 Oxford: Oxford University Press.
- Banton, M. (2005). "Finding, and Correcting, My Mistakes". Sociology. 39 (3): 463. doi:10.1177/0038038505052488. S2CID 144648080.
- Banton, M (2005). "Three current issues in ethnic and racial studies". The British Journal of Sociology. 56 (4): 621–33. doi:10.1111/j.1468-4446.2005.00086.x. PMID 16309439.
- Banton, Michael (2007). "Max Weber on 'ethnic communities': a critique". Nations and Nationalism. 13: 19. doi:10.1111/j.1469-8129.2007.00271.x.
- Banton, Michael (2008). "Problem-Finding in Ethnic and Racial Studies". In John Eade; Martyn Barrett; Chris Floud; Richard Race (eds.). Advancing Multiculturalism, Post 7/7. Cambridge Scholars. ISBN 978-1-84718-419-1.
- Banton, Michael (2008). "The sociology of ethnic relations" (PDF). Ethnic and Racial Studies (Submitted manuscript). 31 (7): 1267. doi:10.1080/01419870701710922. S2CID 145489682.
