= Brendan Burchell =

British academic

Brendan J Burchell is a professor at the Faculty of Human, Social, and Political Science at the University of Cambridge and a professorial fellow of Magdalene College, Cambridge. He was a director of graduate education in sociology 2008–2012 and head of the department of sociology from October 2012 to October 2014. Burchell is the current director of studies in politics and sociology for Magdalene College and was the director of the Cambridge Undergraduate Quantitative Methods Centre (CUQM) between 2014 and 2018.

Burchell read his undergraduate degree in psychology at Birmingham University from 1977 to 1980, and went on to gain a PhD in social psychology from Warwick University researching person perception under laboratory conditions. He then took a one-year post at The City University teaching social psychology, statistics and computing. His career took a change of direction when, in 1985, he was appointed to the Department of Applied Economics at Cambridge as a research officer to assist in a project entitled the Social Change and Economic Life Initiative, working collaboratively with economists, social psychologists and sociologists on a variety of aspects of labour markets and their effects on individuals. In 1988 Dr Burchell transferred from the Department of Applied Economics to take a Lectureship in the Faculty of Social and Political Sciences, specialising in the teaching of data analysis, psychological aspects of unemployment, work intensification, job insecurity as well as undergraduate project work.

In 2011 Burchell was awarded the Pilkington Prize, a University of Cambridge award for excellence in teaching.

Burchell's recent research projects have included the effects of labour market experiences on psychological well-being, work intensification and job insecurity; predictors and correlates of the transition into self-employment; managers' and employees' different perspectives on jobs, part-time work and gender differences in working conditions and careers, restless leg syndrome and financial phobia. He has held numerous research grants published widely in the academic literature; his work has been featured widely in newspapers and social media. In 2019 his team's work on the Employment Dosage Project received widespread media coverage in new sites such as The Guardian, The Independent, ITV, the Telegraph, the Metro, and Vice. He has supervised 25 PhD students.

Most recently, Professor Burchell lead a team of researchers at the University of Cambridge in monitoring a trial of the 4 day working week for 61 UK based companies. To date, it is the world's largest trial of the 4 day working week.

== Bibliography ==
Selected publications Published reports

- Horrell, Sara; Rubery, Jill; Burchell, Brendan J. (September 1989). "Unequal jobs or unequal pay?". Industrial Relations Journal. 20 (3): 176–191. doi:10.1111/j.1468-2338.1989.tb00065.x.
- Horrell, Sara; Rubery, Jill; Burchell, Brendan J. (June 1990). "Gender and skills". Work, Employment & Society. 4 (2): 189–216. doi:10.1177/0950017090004002002. S2CID 145225936.
- Burchell, Brendan J.; Rubery, Jill (December 1990). "An empirical investigation into the segmentation of the labour supply". Work, Employment & Society. 4 (4): 551–575. doi:10.1177/0950017090004004005. S2CID 154619456.
- Burchell, Brendan J.; Marsh, Catherine (August 1992). "The effect of questionnaire length on survey response". Quality and Quantity. 26 (3): 233–244. doi:10.1007/BF00172427. S2CID 119538934.
- Burchell, Brendan J. (December 1992). "Towards a social psychology of the labour market: or why we need to understand the labour market before we can understand unemployment". Journal of Occupational and Organizational Psychology. 65 (4): 345–354. doi:10.1111/j.2044-8325.1992.tb00510.x.
- Burchell, B.J. and Wilkinson, F.S. (1993) 'Sunday Trading and Premium Payments for Shop Workers in Small Shops' : Relationship Foundation.
- Burchell, Brendan J. (June 1993). "A new way of analyzing labour market flows using work history data". Work, Employment & Society. 7 (2): 237–258. doi:10.1177/095001709372004. S2CID 154679296.
- Burchell, Brendan J. (October 1996). "Gender segregation, size of workplace and the public sector". Gender, Work & Organization. 3 (4): 227–235. doi:10.1111/j.1468-0432.1996.tb00062.x.
- Burchell, B.J. and Ely, M. (1997) 'Income, Wealth and Opportunity in Cambridge, 1997: A background document'. Cambridge: Cambridge City Council.
- Burchell, Brendan J.; Wilkinson, Frank (March 1997). "Trust, business arrangements and contractual environment". Cambridge Journal of Economics. 21 (2): 217–237. doi:10.1093/oxfordjournals.cje.a013667.
- Burchell, Brendan J.; Yagil, Dana (December 1997). "Socioeconomic and political initiators of pay comparisons". Work, Employment & Society. 11 (4): 737–748. doi:10.1177/0950017097114007. S2CID 153948663.
- Burchell, B.J., Deakin, D. and Honey, S. (1999) 'The Employment Status of Individuals in Non-Standard Employment' : Department of Trade and Industry EMAR publications No 6.
- Burchell, Brendan J. (September 1999). "The unequal distribution of job insecurity, 1966–86". International Review of Applied Economics. 13 (3): 439–460. doi:10.1080/026921799101625.
- Burchell, Brendan J.; Green, Francis; Felstead, Alan (December 2000). "Job insecurity and the difficulty of regaining employment: an empirical study of unemployment expectations". Oxford Bulletin of Economics and Statistics. 62 (s1): 855–883. doi:10.1111/1468-0084.0620s1855.
- Wichert, I.C., Nolan, J.P. and Burchell, B.J. (2000) 'Workers on the Edge: Job Insecurity, Psychological wellbeing and Family Life'. Washington DC: Economic Policy Institute.
- Fagan, C. and Burchell, B.J. (2002) Gender, Jobs and Working Conditions in the European Union. Dublin: European Foundation for the Improvement of Living and Working Conditions.
- Burchell, B.J. (2003) Identifying, describing and understanding Financial Aversion: Financial phobes. Report for Egg.
- Elliott, John Sue Long, Barbara Walker, David Bridges with John Brierley Malcolm Brynin, Brendan Burchell, Sara Connolly, Mark Deas, Muriel Egerton, Kieth Hawkins, Geraldine Healy, Geoffrey Hinchliffe, Alison Lys, Ron Martin, Shaun Tyson 2004. The dynamics of the graduate labour market in the East of England A report by the Graduate Labour Market Policy Research Forum, EEDA/University of East Anglia.
- Burchell, Brendan J.; Fagan, Colette (Fall 2004). "Gender and the intensification of work: evidence from the "European Working Conditions Surveys"". Eastern Economic Journal. 30 (4). Palgrave Macmillan: 627–642. JSTOR 40326153.
- Burchell, Brendan J.; Kamerade, Daiga (September 2004). "Teleworking and participatory capital: is teleworking an isolating or a community-friendly form of work?". European Sociological Review. 20 (4): 345–361. doi:10.1093/esr/jch030.
- Burchell, B.J. and Hughes, A. (2006), "The stigma of failure: An international comparison of failure tolerance and second chancing", Centre for Business Research, Working paper 334.
- Burchell, Brendan J.; Biggs, David; Millmore, Mike (2006). "The changing world of the temporary worker: the potential HR impact of legislation" (PDF). Personnel Review. 35 (2): 191–206. doi:10.1108/00483480610645821.
- Burchell, B.J. (2007), "The social, Psychological and Economic Costs of Job Insecurity", Ohara Institute for Social Research, Hosei University, Working Paper 25 (Language: Japanese).
- Burchell, B., Fagan, C., O’Brien, C., and Smith, M, (2007), "Working Conditions in the European Union: The Gender Perspective", European Foundation.
- Burchell, Brendan J.; Lai, Yi (March–July 2008). "Distributed work: communication in an 'officeless firm'". New Technology, Work and Employment. 23 (1–2): 61–76. doi:10.1111/j.1468-005X.2008.00203.x. S2CID 110231375.
- Smith, Mark; Burchell, Brendan; Fagan, Colette; O'Brien, Catherine (November 2008). "Job quality in Europe". Industrial Relations Journal. 39 (6): 586–603. doi:10.1111/j.1468-2338.2008.00507.x. S2CID 154901201.
- Burchell, Brendan J.; Allen, Richard P.; Miller, Jessica K.; Hening, Wayne A.; Earley, Christopher J. (September 2009). "RLS and blood donation". Sleep Medicine. 10 (8): 844–849. doi:10.1016/j.sleep.2008.09.013. PMID 19157975. Pdf.
- Burchell, Brendan J. (November 2009). "Flexicurity as a moderator of the relationship between job insecurity and psychological well-being". Cambridge Journal of Regions, Economy and Society. 2 (3): 365–378. doi:10.1093/cjres/rsp021.
- Burchell, B.J., Cartron, D., Csizmadia, P., Delcampe, S., Gollac, M., Illéssy, M., Lorenz, E., Makó, C., O’Brien, C. & Valeyre, A. (2009) ‘Working conditions in the European Union: Working time and work intensity’, European Foundation, October.
- Allen, Richard P.; Burchell, Brendan J.; MacDonald, Ben; Hening, Wayne A.; Earley, Christopher J. (December 2009). "Validation of the self-completed Cambridge-Hopkins questionnaire (CH-RLSq) for ascertainment of restless legs syndrome (RLS) in a population survey". Sleep Medicine. 10 (10): 1097–1100. doi:10.1016/j.sleep.2008.10.007. PMID 19195928. Pdf.
- Burchell, Brendan J. (28 February 2011). "A temporal comparison of the effects of unemployment and job insecurity on wellbeing" (PDF). Sociological Research Online. 16 (1): 66–78. doi:10.5153/sro.2277. S2CID 145593956.
- Shapiro, G. K., & Burchell, B. J. (2012). Measuring financial anxiety. Journal of Neuroscience, Psychology, and Economics, 5(2), 92–103. https://doi.org/10.1037/a0027647
- Racko, G., & Burchell, B. (2013). The role of technical progress, professionalization and Christian religion in occupational gender segregation: a cross-national analysis. Work, Employment and Society, 27(4), 581–599 https://doi.org/10.1080/09585192.2013.845423
- Piasna, A., Smith, M., Rose, J., Rubery, J., Burchell, B., & Rafferty, A. (2013). Participatory HRM practices and job quality of vulnerable workers. The International Journal of Human Resource Management, 24(22), 4094–4115 https://doi.org/10.1080/09585192.2013.845423
- Burchell, B., & Tumawu, K. D. A. (2014). Employee motivation and work ethic in the state and private sector in Ghana: a survey of teaching and banking professions. Online Journal of African Affairs, 3(4), 55–62
- Burchell, B., Sehnbruch, K., Piasna, A., & Agloni, N. (2014). The quality of employment and decent work: definitions, methodologies, and ongoing debates. Cambridge Journal of Economics, 38(2), 459–477 https://doi.org/10.1093/cje/bet067
- Sehnbruch, K., Burchell, B., Agloni, N., & Piasna, A. (2015). Human development and decent work: why some concepts succeed and others fail to make an impact. Development and Change, 46(2), 197–224 https://doi.org/10.1111/dech.12149
- O’Reilly, J., Smith, M., Deakin, S., & Burchell, B. (2015). Equal Pay as a Moving Target: International perspectives on forty-years of addressing the gender pay gap. Cambridge Journal of Economics, 39(2), 299–317 https://doi.org/10.1093/cje/bev010
- Didriksen, M., Hansen, T., Rigas, A., Allen, R., Burchell, B., Thørner, L., ... Ullum, H. (2017). Comorbidities to restless legs syndrome: results from the Danish Blood Donor Study. Sleep Medicine, 40(1)https://doi.org/10.1016/j.sleep.2017.11.227
- Didriksen, M., Rigas, A. S., Allen, R. P., Burchell, B. J., Di Angelantonio, E., Nielsen, M. H., ... Ullum, H. (2017). Prevalence of restless legs syndrome and associated factors in an otherwise healthy population: results from the Danish Blood Donor Study. Sleep Medicine, 36, 55–61.https://doi.org/10.1016/j.sleep.2017.04.014
- Racko, G., Strauss, K., & Burchell, B. (2017). Economics education and value change: the role of program-normative homogeneity and peer influence. Academy of Management Learning & Education, 16(3), 373–392 https://doi.org/10.5465/amle.2014.0280
- Annor, F., & Burchell, B. (2018). A cross-national comparative study of work demands/support, work-to-family conflict and job outcomes: Ghana versus the United Kingdom. International Journal of Cross Cultural Management, 18(1), 53–72 https://doi.org/10.1177/1470595817746195
- Didriksen, M., Allen, R. P., Burchell, B. J., Thørner, L. W., Rigas, A. S., Di Angelantonio, E., ... Ullum, H. (2018). Restless legs syndrome is associated with major comorbidities in a population of Danish blood donors. Sleep Medicine, 45, 124–131 https://doi.org/10.1016/j.sleep.2018.02.007
- Burchell, B. J., & Coutts, A. P. (2019). The Experience of Self-Employment Among Young People: An Exploratory Analysis of 28 Low- to Middle-Income Countries. American Behavioral Scientist, 63 (2), 147-165 https://doi.org/10.1177/0002764218794240
- Kaptoge, S, De Angelantonio, E, Moore, C. ... Burchell, B et al. (2019) Longer-term efficiency and safety of increasing the frequency of whole blood donation (INTERVAL): extension study of a randomised trial of 20 757 blood donors. The Lancet, Haematology 6 (10) 2 August 510-520 https://doi.org/10.1016/S2352-3026(19)30106-1
- Kamerade, D., Wang, S., Burchell, B., Balderson, S.U., & Coutts, A. (2019) A shorter working week for everyone: How much paid work is needed for mental health and well-being? Social Science and Medicine, 24 https://doi.org/10.1016/j.socscimed.2019.06.006
- Piasna, A., B Burchell, B. & Sehnbruch, K. (2019) Job quality in European employment policy: one step forward, two steps back? Transfer: European Review of Labour and Research. Vol 2, 165-180 https://doi.org/10.1177/1024258919832213
- Balderson, S.U., Burchell, B., Kamerade, D., Wang, S. & Coutts, A. (2020) An exploration of the multiple motivations for spending less time at work. Time and Society https://doi.org/10.1177/0961463X20953945
- Wang, S., Coutts, A., Burchell, B., Kamerade, D. &. Balderson, S.U., (2020) (2020) Can Active Labour Market Programmes Emulate the Mental Health Benefits of Regular Paid employment? Longitudinal Evidence from the United Kingdom. Work, Employment and Society https://doi.org/10.1177%2F0950017020946664
- Burchell, B., Reuschke, D., & Zhang, M. (2020). Spatial and temporal segmenting of urban workplaces: The gendering of multi-locational working. Urban Studies. https://doi.org/10.1177/0042098020903248
- Brewin, C., Miller, J., Soffia, M., Peart, A., & Burchell, B. (2020). Posttraumatic stress disorder and complex posttraumatic stress disorder in UK police officers. Psychological Medicine, 1–9. doi:10.1017/S0033291720003025

Other journal articles (not peer refereed)

- Burchell, L.J.; Burchell, B.J. (1988). "The Effects of Unemployment on Youth Training Scheme Leavers". Journal of Youth and Policy. 24: 20–24.
- Burchell, B.J. (1995). 'Exploratory Data Analysis'. Pharmacy Practice Research Resource Centre Bulletin 4: 9–12.
- Burchell, B.J., Felstead, A. and Green, F. (1998). 'Insecurity at Work'. New Economy 5: 180–184.
- Burchell, B.J. (2002). 'Les Conséquences Psychologiques et Familiales de l'Insécurité Professionnelle.'. Les Politiques Sociales 61: 100–115
- Burchell, B.J. (2004) Identifying, describing and understanding Financial Aversion: Financial phobes. Argent.
- Burchell, B.J. (2005) The welfare costs of job insecurity: psychological wellbeing and family life. Trends in social cohesion special issue: Reconciling labour flexibility with social cohesion – facing the challenge 15, 71–108.
- Burchell, B.J. (2005) Les Couts sociaux de la precarite de l’emploi: bien-etre psychologique et la vie familiale. Tendances de la cohesion sociale: Concilier flexibilite du travail et cohesion sociale – Un defi a relever 15, 75–116.
- Burchell, B.J. (2006) Anglais, encore un effort! L’intensite du travail au Royaume-Uni. Actes de la research en sciences sociales 163 (June) 91–100.
- Brosnan, C & Burchell, B.J. (2006) Diagnosing restless legs syndrome: when words get in the way. Progress in Neurology and Psychiatry 10(3) 33–35.
- Burchell, B. (2012). Book review: David Guest, Kerstin Isaksson and Hans de Witte (eds), Employment Contracts, Psychological Contracts and Employee Well-being. Work, Employment & Society, 26(3), 545–546
- Burchell, B., & Wood, A. (2014, September). Beyond zero-hours: reducing the misery of insecure hours. Safety Management
- Wood, A., & Burchell, B. (2015, April). What Dave, Vince and Ed don’t tell you about zero-hours contracts. Open Democracy
- Wood, A., & Burchell, B. (2015, September). Zero hours employment: a new temporality of capitalism? Reviews & Critical Commentary (CritCom)
- Kamerade, D., Balderson, S.U., Burchell, B., Wang, S., & Coutts, A. (2020) Shorter working week and workers’ well-being and Mental health. Centre for Business Research Working Paper No.522, University of Cambridge
- * Burchell, B., Wang, S., Kamerāde, D., Bessa, I., & Rubery, J. (2020). Cut hours, not people: no work, furlough, short hours and mental health during the COVID019 pandemic in the UK. Centre for Business Research Working Paper No.521, University of Cambridge.

Book chapters

- Burchell, B.J. (1989) The impact on the individual of the experience of precariousness in the labour market in the UK. In G. Rodgers & J. Rodgers (Eds) Precarious jobs in Labour Market Regulation: The growth of atypical employment in Western Europe IILS, Geneva.
- Burchell, B.J. and Rubery, J. (1992). 'Problems in defining and typologising the self-employed: Some evidence from the Social Change and Economic Life Initiative ' in Felsted, A. and Leighton, P. (eds.) Self-Employment: Evolution and practice in Europe: Kogan Page.
- Burchell, B.J. (1992). 'Changes in the Labour Market and the Psychological Health of the Nation' in Michie, J. (ed.) The Economic Legacy, 1979-1992: Academic Press.
- Burchell, B.J., Elliott, B.J., Rubery, J. and Wilkinson, F. (1994). 'Job content from Managers' and Employees' perspectives' in Penn, R., Rose, M. and Rubery, J. (eds.) Patterns of Skill Change. Oxford: Oxford University Press.
- Burchell, B.J., Elliott, B.J. and Rubery, J. (1994). 'Gender and the structuring of labour markets' in Rubery, J. and Wilkinson, F. (eds.) Employer Strategy and the Labour Market. Oxford: Oxford University Press.
- Burchell, B.J., Horrell, S. and Rubery, J. (1994). 'Working Time Patterns, Constraints and Preferences' in Anderson, M., Bechhofer, F. and Gershuny, J. (eds.) The Social and Political Economy of the Household. Oxford: Oxford University Press.
- Burchell, B.J. and Rubery, J. (1994). 'Divided women: Labour Market Segmentation and Gender Segregation' in Scott, A.M. (ed.) Gender Segregation and Social Change. Oxford: Oxford University Press.
- Burchell, B.J. (1994). 'Who is affected by Unemployment? Job insecurity and Labour Market influences on Psychological Health.' in Gallie, D., Marsh, C. and Vogler, C. (eds.) Social Change and the experience of Unemployment. Oxford: Oxford University Press.
- Burchell, B.J., Horrell, S. and Rubery, J. (1994). 'Part-time work and gender inequality in the labour market' in Scott, A.M. (ed.) Gender Segregation and Social Change. Oxford: Oxford University Press.
- Burchell, B.J. and Rubery, J. (1994). 'Internal Labour Markets from Managers' and Employees' perspectives' in Rubery, J. and Wilkinson, F. (eds.) Employer Policies and the Labour Market. Oxford: Oxford University Press.
- Horrell, Sara; Rubery, Jill; Burchell, Brendan J. (1995), "Gender and skills", in Humphries, Jane (ed.), Gender and economics, Aldershot, England Brookfield, Vermont, USA: Edward Elgar, pp. 512–540, ISBN 9781852788438.
- Burchell, B.J., Dale, A. and Joshi, H. (1997). 'Part-Time Work Among British Women' in Blossfeld, P. and Hakim, C. (eds.) Between equalisation and marginalisation: part-time work in Europe. Oxford: Oxford University Press.
- Ashton, D., Burchell, B.J., Felstead, A. and Green, F. (1999). 'Skill trends in Britain: trajectories over the last decade' in Coffield, F. (ed.) Speaking Truth to Power: Research and policy on lifelong learning. Bristol: Polity Press.
- Nolan, J.P., Wichert, I.C. and Burchell, B.J. (1999). 'Job insecurity, psychological well-being, work orientation and family life' in Heery, E. (ed.) The Insecure Workforce: Routledge.
- Burchell, B.J. (2001). 'Perceiving and Understanding People' in Fraser, C. and Burchell, B.J. (eds.) Introducing Social Psychology. Cambridge: Polity Press.
- Burchell, B.J. (2001). 'Research Methods' in Fraser, C. and Burchell, B.J. (eds.) Introducing Social Psychology. Cambridge: Polity Press.
- Fraser, C. and Burchell, B.J. (2001). 'The World of Paid Work' in Fraser, C. and Burchell, B.J. (eds.) Introducing Social Psychology. Cambridge: Polity Press.
- Burchell, B.J. (2002). 'The prevalence and redistribution of job security and work intensification.' in Burchell, B.J., Ladipo, D. and Wilkinson, F. (eds.) Job Insecurity and Work Intensification. London: Routledge.
- Ladipo, D., Mankelow, R. and Burchell, B.J. (2003). 'Working like a dog, sick as a dog: Job Intensification in the late 20th Century' in Burchell, B.J., Deakin, S., Michie, J. and Rubery, J. (eds.) Systems of Production: Markets, Organisations and Performance. London: Routledge.
- Rubery, J., Burchell, B.J., Deakin, S. and Michie, J. (2003). 'Productive Systems: Introduction and Overview' in Burchell, B.J., Deakin, S., Michie, J. and Rubery, J. (eds.) Systems of Production: Markets, Organisations and Performance. London: Routledge.
- Burchell, B.J. (2006) Work Intensification in the UK. In D. Perrons, C Fagan, L McDowell K Ray and K Ward (Eds) Gender divisions and working time in the new economy. Cheltenham, UK: Edward Elgar.
- Fagan, C.& Burchell B.J. (2006) L’intensification du travail et les différences hommes/femmes: conclusions des enquêtes européennes sur les conditions de travail. In P Askenazy, D Cartron, F de Coninck & M Gollac (Eds) Organisation et intensité du travail. Paris.
- Biggs, D., Burchell, B., & Millmore, M. (2008). 臨時人員世界的變化：立法對人力資源可能造成的影響 (The changing world of the temporary worker: the potential HR impact of legislation). Taiwan: Human Resources Dispatching
- Burchell, B. (2012). Quality of work: the case of part-time work in Italy. In T. Addabbo & G. Solinas (Eds.), Non-Standard Employment and Quality of Work: The case of Italy (AIEL Series in Labour Economics) (pp. 175–188). Berlin: Physica-Verlag HD
- Piasna, A., Burchell, B., Sehnbruch, K., & Agloni, N. (2017). Job quality: conceptual and methodological challenges for comparative analysis. In D. Grimshaw, C. Fagan, G. Hebson, & I. Tavora (Eds.), Making work more equal: A new labour market segmentation approach (pp. 168–187). Manchester: Manchester University Press
- Burchell, B., & Wood, A. (2017). You are never secure: UK workers in the era of flexibility. In Z. Svendsen & S. Daw (Eds.), World Factory: The Game (pp. 324–327). London: Nick Hern Books.
- Burchell, B., Coutts, A., Hall, E., O’Higgins, N., & Pye, N. (2017). Self-employment and entrepreneurship. In N. O’Higgins (Ed.), Rising to the youth employment challenge: New evidence on key policy issues (pp. 87–112). Geneva: International Labour Office
- Sparkes, M., Gumy, J., & Burchell, B. (2018). Debt. In A. Lewis (Ed.), The Cambridge Handbook of Psychology and Economic Behaviour (2nd ed., pp. 198–233). Cambridge: Cambridge University Press. https://doi.org/10.1017/9781316676349
- Wood, A. J., & Burchell, B. (2018). Unemployment and Well-Being. In A. Lewis (Ed.), The Cambridge Handbook of Psychology and Economic Behaviour (2nd ed., pp. 234–259). Cambridge: Cambridge University Press. https://doi.org/10.1017/9781316676349

Books, authored

- Burchell, B.J., Earnshaw, J. and Rubery, J. (1993). New forms and new patterns of employment: The role of self-employment in the UK. University of Bremen: Zentrum Fur Europaische Reschts Politik.
- Burchell, B.J., Day, D., Hudson, M., Ladipo, D., Mankelow, R., Nolan, J., Reed, H., Wichert, I. and Wilkinson, F. (1999). Job Insecurity and work intensification; flexibility and the changing boundaries of work. York: York publishing

Books, edited

- Burchell, B., Ladipo D. and Wilkinson, F. (Eds) (2002) Job Insecurity and Work Intensification. London: Routledge.
- Fraser, C and Burchell, B. with Hay, D. and Duveen G. (Eds) (2001) Introducing Social Psychology. Oxford: Polity.
- Burchell, B.J., Deakin, S., Michie, J. and Rubery, J. (2003). 'Systems of Production: Markets, Organisations and Performance'. London: Routledge.
