= Maddie Breeze =

Sociologist

- Occupations: Sociologist, lecturer
- Employer: University of Strathclyde
- Awards: Philip Abrams Memorial Prize (2016)

Academic background
- Education: University of Edinburgh

Academic work
- Discipline: Sociology
- Notable works: Seriousness in Women’s Roller Derby: Gender, Organization, and Ambivalence

Maddie Breeze is a British sociologist, and lecturer and Chancellor's Fellow at the University of Strathclyde. In 2016 she won the Philip Abrams Memorial Prize of the British Sociological Association for her book Seriousness in Women’s Roller Derby: Gender, Organization, and Ambivalence.

The book is an ethnographic study of a women's roller derby league in Edinburgh, UK. The book is a published version of her PhD thesis, which she completed at the University of Edinburgh in 2014. It examines "seriousness" in roller derby, and how gender influences the way the sport is represented, played and experienced.

Breeze previously worked as a Research Associate in Sociology and a lecturer in Public sociology at Queen Margaret University in Edinburgh, UK.

== Awards and honours ==
- 2016, Philip Abrams Memorial Prize of the British Sociological Association

== Selected publications ==
- Breeze, Maddie; Taylor, Y; Lahad, K (2018). "Imposter syndrome as a public feeling". Feeling academic in the neoliberal university: feminist flights, fights, and failures. Basingstoke: Palgrave.
- Breeze, Maddie; Taylor, Yvette (2018). "Feminist collaborations in higher education: stretched across career stages" (PDF). Gender and Education. 32 (3): 412–428. doi:10.1080/09540253.2018.1471197.
- Breeze, Maddie (2015). Seriousness in Women's Roller Derby: Gender Organization & Ambivalence. Basingstoke: Palgrave. ISBN 978-1-137-50483-8.
- Breeze, Maddie (2013). "Analysing "Seriousness" in Roller Derby: Speaking Critically with the Serious Leisure Perspective". Sociological Research Online. 18 (4): 237–249. doi:10.5153/sro.3236.
- Breeze, Maddie (2010). "There's No Balls in Derby: Roller Derby as a Unique, Gendered Sports Context". The International Journal of Sport and Society. 1 (3): 121–133. doi:10.18848/2152-7857/CGP/v01i03/54028.
