= The British Journal of Sociology =

- Discipline: Sociology
- Language: English
- Edited by: Daniel Laurison

Publication details
- History: 1950–present
- Publisher: Wiley-Blackwell for the London School of Economics (United Kingdom)
- Frequency: Quarterly
- Impact factor: 1.894 (2019)

Standard abbreviations
- ISO 4: Br. J. Sociol.

Indexing
- ISSN: 0007-1315 (print); 1468-4446 (web)

Links
- Journal homepage; Online access; Online archive

The British Journal of Sociology is a peer-reviewed academic journal that was established in 1950 at the London School of Economics and Political Science. It represents the mainstream of sociological thinking and research and publishes high quality papers on all aspects of the discipline, by academics from all over the world.

The journal has been considered to be among "the highest-status journals [that] are the leaders in their particular field". It is one of the three main sociology journals in the United Kingdom, along with Sociology and The Sociological Review.

The main founders were the sociologists Morris Ginsberg and Thomas Humphrey Marshall. Their intended title, "The London Journal of Sociology", seems to have been changed by the publisher before the first issue was brought out.

In the course of 1991–1994, a controversy between John Goldthorpe and others was carried on in its pages, regarding the merits and weaknesses of current historical sociology.

The most highly cited article, "Class Analysis and the Reorientation of Class Theory: The Case of Persisting Differentials in Educational Attainment" by John Goldthorpe, was cited 1293 times as of 2 March 2024.

== Abstracting and indexing ==
British Journal of Sociology is abstracted and indexed in the Social Sciences Citation Index. According to the Journal Citation Reports, the journal has a 2015 impact factor of 1.894, ranking it 37 out of 142 journals in the category "Sociology".
