= Work, Employment & Society =

- Discipline: Sociology
- Language: English
- Edited by: Elizabeth Cotton, Eleonore Kofman, Ian Roper (Editors-in-Chief)

Publication details
- History: 1987-present
- Publisher: SAGE Publications on behalf of the British Sociological Association (United Kingdom)
- Frequency: Bimonthly
- Impact factor: 5.116 (2019)

Standard abbreviations
- ISO 4: Work Employ. Soc.

Indexing
- ISSN: 0950-0170 (print); 1469-8722 (web)
- LCCN: 88644161
- OCLC no.: 45106968

Links
- Journal homepage; Online access; Online archive

Work, Employment & Society is a peer-reviewed academic journal that publishes papers in the fields of sociology and industrial relations. It has been in publication since 1984 and is currently published by SAGE Publications on behalf of the British Sociological Association.

== Scope ==
Work, Employment & Society publishes theoretically informed and original research on the sociology of work. The journal aims to cover all aspects of work, employment and unemployment and their connections with wider social processes and social structures.

== Abstracting and indexing ==
Work, Employment and Society is abstracted and indexed in, among other databases: SCOPUS, and the Social Sciences Citation Index. According to the Journal Citation Reports, its 2019 impact factor is 5.116, ranking 32 out of 377 journals in the category "Economics". and ranking it 7 out of 149 journals in the category "Sociology". and 2 out of 30 journals in the category "Industrial Relations and Labor".
