= Sociology (journal) =

- Discipline: Sociology
- Language: English
- Edited by: Rachel Brooks and Robert Meadows (Editors-in-Chief)

Publication details
- History: 1967-present
- Publisher: SAGE Publications on behalf of the British Sociological Association (United Kingdom)
- Frequency: Bimonthly
- Impact factor: 2.9 (2022)

Standard abbreviations
- ISO 4: Sociology

Indexing
- ISSN: 0038-0385 (print); 1469-8684 (web)
- LCCN: 73012649
- OCLC no.: 1765950

Links
- Journal homepage

Sociology is a peer-reviewed academic journal published by SAGE Publications on behalf of the British Sociological Association.

Sociology is the highest impact ranked journal in the UK for the subject area. Sociology is regarded as one of the three "main sociology journals in Britain," along with The Sociological Review and the British Journal of Sociology.

The journal was established in 1967 as "the clearest intellectual representative of the social aspirations of the Butskellite era," with Michael Banton serving as its first editor. It was formerly published by Cambridge University Press and has been published by SAGE Publications since 2002. It was from the outset the official journal of the British Sociological Association.

== Abstracting and indexing ==
Sociology is abstracted and indexed in Scopus and the Social Sciences Citation Index. According to the Journal Citation Reports, its 2022 impact factor is 2.9, ranking it 39th out of 149 journals in the category "Sociology".

== Former editors ==
- Michael Banton 1967–1970
- John Goldthorpe 1970–1973
- Gordon Horobin 1973-
- Philip Abrams
- Joan Chandler
- David S. Byrne
- Martin Albrow 1981–1984
- Jennifer Platt 1985–1987
- Janet Finch and Nick Abercrombie 1988–90
- David Morgan and Liz Stanley 1991–1993
- William Outhwaite 1993–95
- Stephanie Lawler 2003–2006
- Vanessa May, Alan Warde,Helen Holmes, Simin Fadaee 2018–2021
