= Graeme Kirkpatrick =

British academic

- Education: PhD, Birkbeck, University of London
- Known for: Sociology, critical theory, and game studies

Graeme Kirkpatrick is a Professor of Social and Cultural Theory at the University of Manchester. He has also worked as Professor in media arts, aesthetics and narration at the University of Skövde in Sweden, and has been a visiting Professorial fellow of the Digital Cultures Research Programme (Australian Research Council) at Flinders University in Adelaide.

== Early work ==
Kirkpatrick's early work focused on analytical Marxist theory. His first book, Critical Technology: a social theory of personal computing, won the 2005 Philip Abrams Memorial Prize from the British Sociological Association. It was a critical interrogation of the principles of ‘user friendly’ and ‘easy to use’ interface design. The main argument of the book was that friendly machines are still machines and that coming to terms with this tends to promote a cynical temperament in their human users, who soon see through the surface charms of coloured screens and seductive avatars. In his next book, Technology and Social Power, he developed a critical theory of interpretation that applies to technology design in social context, using examples from digital culture, including 3-D printers and video games.

== Game studies ==
Kirkpatrick has developed this approach further in connection with computer, or video games. In his Aesthetic Theory and the Video Game he argues that the aesthetic appeal of games does not lie where we expect to find it – in sumptuous on-screen imagery – but in the physical sensations of gameplay. Because most video game analysis is informed by conventional media theory it tends to interpret games in terms of their ‘content’, or message, viewing the game as a sign system. This overlooks the most important part of the experience of gameplay and the fact that we can often enjoy a game without ever thinking about what it, or the activity of playing it, ‘means’. In his second book on games, Computer Games and the Social Imaginary, Kirkpatrick presents a history of digital games that links their rise to the spread of neo-liberalism, a version of capitalism that fosters and relies upon a playful disposition on the part of its subjects.

In his most recent contributions to game studies, The Formation of Gaming Culture, Kirkpatrick has focused on the history of gameplay, looking at when the idea became the central term of game criticism in the 1980s. He argues that this corresponds to the period when games played on computers and arcade machines became ‘video (or computer) games’ in the sense we give that phrase today. As a social group formed in connection with the activity of playing the games, 'gamers' produced their own lexicon of game evaluation and appraisal, and their expectations and preferences shaped the subsequent development of gaming as a cultural practice.

Kirkpatrick has argued that the distinctive properties of computer games are not only important to understanding them and their culture but have been instrumental in wider social changes. This is related to his theory of digital culture, according to which it is more playful than previous phases in history but not, for all that, an inherently nicer or fairer place to be.

== Selected publications ==
- Kirkpatrick, Graeme (2004) Critical Technology: A social theory of personal computing. Ashgate. ISBN 9780754640097
- Kirkpatrick, Graeme (2008) Technology and Social Power. Palgrave Macmillan. ISBN 9781403947307
- Kirkpatrick, Graeme (2011) Aesthetic Theory and the Video Game. Manchester University Press. ISBN 9780719077180
- Kirkpatrick, Graeme (2013) Computer Games and the Social Imaginary. Polity. ISBN 9780745641119
- Kirkpatrick, Graeme (2015) The Formation of Gaming Culture. Palgrave. ISBN 9781137305091
- Kirkpatrick, Graeme (2020) Technical Politics: Andrew Feenberg's Critical Theory of Technology. Manchester University Press. ISBN 9781526105349

== Interviews ==
2015 ‘Game studies, Aesthetics and active objects: an interview’ (with Ben Nicoll) in Platform: Journal of Media and Communication 6(2) pp108–118.
