= Stevi Jackson =

British academic

- Born: 23 June 1951 (age 75)
- Education: University of York
- Known for: Professor of women's studies
- Scientific career
- Fields: Psychology, women's studies
- Workplaces: University of York, England

Stevi Jackson (born 23 June 1951), is an academic and writer working in the field of gender and sexuality. She has been Professor of Women's studies at the University of York, England since 1998, and is Director of the University's Centre for Women's Studies.

== Education ==
Stevi Jackson earned her degree in Sociology from the University of Kent in 1972. In 1973 she gained her master's from the University of York.

== Writings ==
She has been writing on feminist topics since 1973, and describes her research as an attempt to explain and theorise her own experience of being a heterosexual woman. She explicitly states throughout her work that she is a heterosexual feminist working within a materialist framework. Jackson has been politically active throughout her life, particularly in the 1970s when she engaged in consciousness raising groups, went to national conferences and helped to set up Rape Crisis in Cardiff. During the Thatcher years, she joined the Labour party to counter the damage she saw being done by the government. She says Labour was “a good base for feminist campaigning”. In the 1980s, she shied away from action during the "sex wars" which attacked heterosexual feminists for fraternising with the "enemy". She found this period destructive for feminism and as a heterosexual feminist, preferred to stay out of the debates on the issue. Recently, her political action has involved trying to keep women's studies alive as a space for women to explore feminism but regrets that rising higher in academia leaves less time for feminist action. She believes it is important to build a bridge between feminist theory and practice which is why she particularly enjoyed writing for radical feminist magazine Trouble and Strife. Jackson's utopia is an egalitarian world without gender where “your genitals matter as little as your hair colour”. A world where marriage is abolished, selective foetus abortion is legal and those who wish to commit to one another engage in civil partnerships. She advocates a collective model of child rearing and believes that heterosexual, monogamous couples are not necessarily the best parents.

== Selected works ==
- Jackson, Stevi; Jones, Jackie, eds. (1998). Contemporary feminist theories. Edinburgh: Edinburgh University Press. ISBN 978-0748611416.
