= Kenneth Little =

- Born: 19 September 1908; Auckland, New Zealand
- Died: 28 February 1991 (aged 82); Edinburgh, Scotland
- Scientific career
- Fields: Social anthropology
- Thesis: Negroes in Britain (1947)
- Academic advisors: Raymond Firth
- Doctoral students: Michael Banton

Kenneth Lindsay Little (19 September 1908 – 28 February 1991) was an English academic who started out as a physical anthropologist. He attended the London School of Economics where he studied under Raymond Firth. He subsequently headed the Department of Social Anthropology at the University of Edinburgh.

== Biography ==
Kenneth Little was born in West Derby, Liverpool, where his father, Harold Muir Little, was a ship broker. His mother was Annie, née Livesey. He attended Liverpool College, and then went on to Selwyn College, Cambridge.

In 1942, Little wrote to John Lucien Keith, chairman of the Colonial Office's Advisory Committee on the Welfare of Colonial Peoples in the United Kingdom, about what he regarded as the justifiable concerns of the representatives of British colonials in the United Kingdom as regards the introduction of American-style racial segregation, reminding Keith that news of incidents of racial clashes and discrimination was very quickly transmitted to the colonies.

Little studied for his Ph.D. at the London School of Economics, and his thesis, which was published in 1948 as Negroes in Britain, was a study of the Black and minority ethnic communities of Cardiff. The African-American sociologist St. Clair Drake worked with the Black community of Cardiff drafting a response, in which the local community said they "distrust people who survey us and study us, who write about us and publicize us, and who try to reform and lead us."

Little went on to complete The Mende of Sierra Leone (published in 1951). When Ralph Piddington moved on from the University of Edinburgh, he encouraged Little to move there to establish a new Social Sciences Research Unit. Appointed as Reader in Social Anthropology, Little was the head of the Department of Social Anthropology, and was appointed a professor in 1965.

== Publications ==
- Negroes in Britain: A Study of Race Relations in English Society (1948)
- The Mende of Sierra Leone (1951)
- West African Urbanization: A Study of Voluntary Associations in Social Change (1965)
- Urbanization as a Social Process: An essay on movement and change in contemporary Africa (1974)
- African Women in Towns: An Aspect of Africa's Social Revolution (1974)
- Urbanization, Migration, and the African Family with Anne Price (1974)
- The Sociology of Urban Women’s Image in African Literature (1980)
