= John Holmwood =

John Holmwood is a British sociologist. His work has focused on social stratification and the relationship between social science and explanation. His later work has concentrated on issues of pragmatism in public sociology. Holmwood is particularly known for his work concerning Talcott Parsons.

Holmwood was formerly the Chair of the Council of UK Heads and Professors of Sociology (2007–2012), and President of the British Sociological Association (2012–2014). He was a fellow of the Academy of Social Sciences, but resigned following disagreement with its 2015 pre-election report, The Business of People. He is also the founder of the Campaign for the Public University, a group promoting an 'alternative white paper' for British higher education, particularly in response to funding cuts.

== Biography ==
Holmwood studied social and political science at the University of Cambridge. He then worked as a teaching assistant at the University of California, before returning to Cambridge to complete a PhD. In 2000 he became Dean of the Social Sciences and Cultural Studies at the University of Sussex. He later became head of the sociology department at the University of Birmingham, before joining the University of Nottingham to become Professor of Sociology. In academic year 2015–14, he was a member of the Institute for Advanced Study at Princeton.

== See also ==
- List of sociologists

== Notes and references ==
Academic offices
Preceded by John David Brewer	President of the British Sociological Association; 2012–2014	Succeeded by Lynn Jamieson
