= European Union citizenship =

The European Union citizenship is a legal status afforded to all nationals of member states of the European Union (EU). It was formally created with the adoption of the 1992 Maastricht Treaty, at the same time as the creation of the EU. EU citizenship is additional to, as it does not replace, national citizenship. It affords EU citizens with rights, freedoms and legal protections available under EU law.

EU citizens have freedom of movement, and the freedom of settlement and employment across the EU. They are free to trade and transport goods, services and capital through EU state borders, with no restrictions on capital movements or fees. EU citizens have the right to vote and run as a candidate in certain (often local) elections in the member state where they live that is not their state of origin, while also voting for EU elections and participating in a European Citizens' Initiative (ECI).

Citizenship of the EU confers the right to consular protection by embassies of other EU member states when an individual's country of citizenship is not represented by an embassy or consulate in the foreign country in which they require protection or other types of assistance. EU citizens have the right to address the European Parliament, the European Ombudsman and EU agencies directly, in any of the EU Treaty languages, provided the issue raised is within that institution's competence.

EU citizens have the legal protections of EU law, including the Charter of Fundamental Rights of the EU and acts and directives regarding protection of personal data, rights of victims of crime, preventing and combating trafficking in human beings, equal pay, as well as protection from discrimination in employment on grounds of religion or belief, sexual orientation and age. The office of the European Ombudsman can be directly approached by EU citizens.

== History ==
The modern EU citizenship status partially relies on the millennia of European history and Europe's common cultural heritage. "The introduction of a European form of citizenship with precisely defined rights and duties was considered as long ago as the 1960s", but the roots of "the key rights of EU citizenship—primarily the right to live and the right to work anywhere within the territory of the Member States—can be traced back to the free movement provisions contained in the Treaty of Paris establishing the European Coal and Steel Community, which entered into force in 1952." The Treaty of Paris introduced freedom of movement for the professionals in the coal and steel industry which may be considered the nascent form of free movement that developed into EU citizenship four decades later. The citizenship of the European Union was first introduced by the Maastricht Treaty, and was extended by the Treaty of Amsterdam. Prior to the 1992 Maastricht Treaty, the European Communities treaties provided guarantees for the free movement of economically active People, but not, generally, for others. The 1951 Treaty of Paris establishing the European Coal and Steel Community established a right to free movement for workers in these industries and the 1957 Treaty of Rome provided for the free movement of workers and services. However, we can find traces of an emerging European personal status in the legal framework regulating the rights and obligations of foreign residents in Europe well before a formal status of European citizenship was introduced. In particular through the interplay between secondary European legislation and the case-law of the European Court of Justice. This formed an embryo of the future European Citizenship, and came to be defined by the practice of freedom of movement of workers within the newly established European Economic Community.

The rights of an "embryonic" European citizenship have been developed by the European Court of Justice well before the formal institution of European citizenship by the Maastricht Treaty. This could happen after the two landmark decisions in the cases Van Gend en Loos and Costa/ENEL, which established (a) the principle of direct effect of EEC law, and (b) the supremacy of European law over national law, including the constitutional one. In particular, the 1957 Rome Treaty provisions were interpreted by the European Court of Justice not as having a narrow economic purpose, but rather a wider social and economic one.

The rights associated with the European Personal Status were firstly recognized "to certain categories of workers, then expanded to all workers, to certain categories of non-workers (e.g. retirees, students), and finally perhaps to all citizens". In line with the model of social citizenship proposed by Thomas Humphrey Marshall, the "European Personal Status" or "Proto-European citizenship" was built by recognizing the social rights connected to freedom of movement and freedom of establishment in the first years of the EEC, when workers' rights in the host state were progressively extended to their family members even beyond the status of "worker", so as to promote the full social integration of the workers and their families in the host member state.

When Regulation 1612/68 abolished movement and residence restrictions for member state workers and their families in the entire EEC territory, thus ending the transitional period established by article 49 of the Rome Treaty, not only this created the conditions for a full exercise of free movement rights, but a number of important new rights were subsequently recognized by the ECJ, such as: the right to a minimum wage in the host state, the reduction of fares on public transport for large families, the right to a check for disabled adults, interest-free loans for the birth of children, the right to reside with a non-spousal partner, the payment of funeral expenses.

As later stated in Levin, the Court found that the "freedom to take up employment was important, not just as a means towards the creation of a single market for the benefit of the member state economies, but as a right for the worker to raise her or his standard of living". Under the ECJ case-law, the rights of free movement of workers applies regardless of the worker's purpose in taking up employment abroad, to both part-time and full-time work, and whether or not the worker required additional financial assistance from the member state into which he moves.

Before the institution of the European citizenship the ECJ interpreted the status of "worker" it beyond its purely literal meaning, progressively extending it to subjects such as non-economically active family members, students, tourists. This led the Court to hold that a mere recipient of services has free movement rights under the Treaty, so that almost every national of an EU country moving to another member state as a recipient of services, whether economically active or not, but provided they do not constitute an unreasonable burden for the host state, shall non be granted equality of treatment had a right to non-discrimination on the ground of nationality even prior to the Maastricht Treaty.

The Maastricht Treaty dispositions on the status of European citizenship (having direct effect, i.e. directly conferring the status of European citizen to all member states nationals) were not immediately applied by the Court, which continued following the previous interpretative approach and employed European citizenship as a supplementary argument in order to confirm and consolidate precedent law. It was only a few years after the entry into force of the Treaty of Maastricht that the Court finally decided to abandon this approach and to recognize the status of European citizen in order to decide the controversies. Two landmark decisions in this sense are Martinez Sala, and Grelczyk.

On the one hand, citizenship has an inclusive character, as it allows its holders freedoms and encourages and enables active participation and active use of these rights. On the other hand, and the following is not meant to diminish this first fact, the inclusion of a certain group results in the differentiation of others. Only through active differentiation and demarcation, i.e. exclusion, an identity with formal criteria can be created.

Due to the history of the EU and its mentioned development, the progress of including and excluding is inevitably full of tensions. Many dynamics in citizenship grounded in the tension between the formal law part and the non-/beyond-law surrounding; such as the enlargement of freedom and rights to every kind of explicitly or implicitly economically active persons. Homeless and poor people do not enjoy these freedoms, because of a lack of economic action. The situation is the same when the home state says someone might no longer enjoy these rights.

Economically inactive EU citizens who want to stay longer than three months in another Member State have to fulfill the condition of having health insurance and "sufficient resources" in order not to become an "unreasonable burden" for the social assistance system of the host Member State, which otherwise can legitimately expel them.

== Stated rights ==
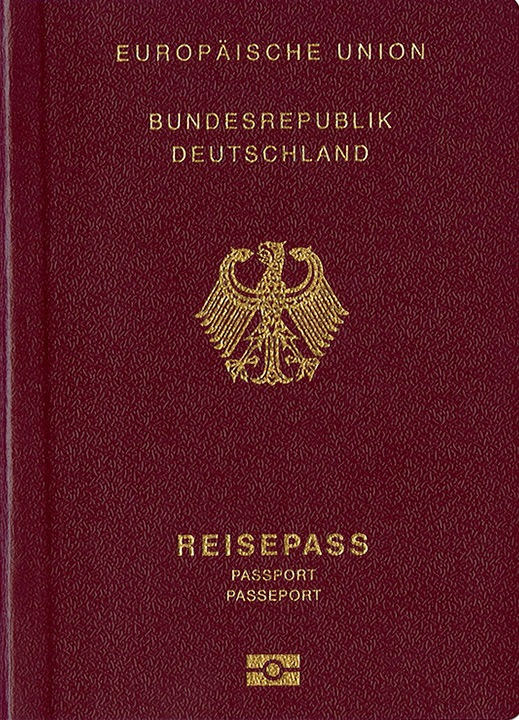
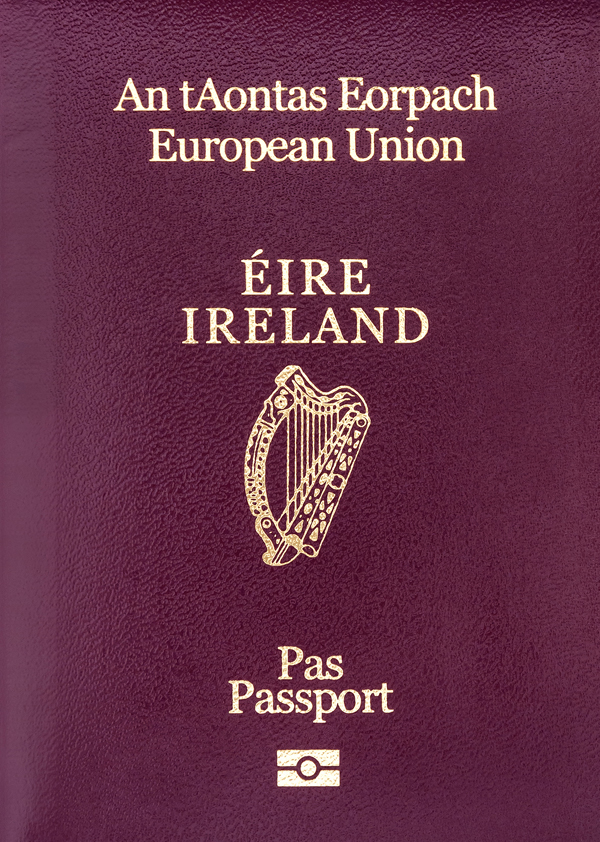
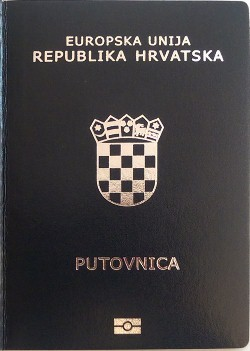
EU member states may use a common passport booklet design, burgundy coloured (except Croatia's dark blue) with the name of the member state, its coat of arms and the title "European Union" (in the language(s) of the issuing country and its translation).

The rights of EU Citizens are enumerated in the Treaty on the Functioning of the European Union and the Charter of Fundamental Rights. Historically, the main benefit of being a citizen of an EU state has been that of free movement. The free movement also applies to the citizens of European Economic Area countries and Switzerland. However, with the creation of EU citizenship, certain political rights came into being.

=== The Charter of Fundamental Rights of the European Union ===
The adoption of the Charter of Fundamental Rights of the European Union (CFR) enshrined specific political, social, and economic rights for EU citizens and residents. Title Five of the CFR focuses specifically on the rights of EU Citizens. Protected rights of EU citizens include the following:

- The right to vote and to stand as a candidate at elections to the European Parliament.
- The right to vote and to stand as a candidate at municipal elections.
- The right to good administration.
- The right of access to documents.
- The right to petition.
- Freedom of movement and of residence.
- Diplomatic and consular protection.

=== Treaty on the Functioning of the European Union ===
The Treaty on the Functioning of the European Union provides for citizens to be "directly represented at Union level in the European Parliament" and "to participate in the democratic life of the Union" (Treaty on the European Union, Title II, Article 10). Specifically, the following rights are afforded:

- Accessing European government documents: a right to access to documents of the EU government, whatever their medium. (Article 15).
- Freedom from any discrimination on nationality: a right not to be discriminated against on grounds of nationality within the scope of application of the Treaty (Article 18);
- Right to not be discriminated against: The EU government may take appropriate action to combat discrimination based on sex, racial or ethnic origin, religion or belief, disability, age or sexual orientation (Article 19);
- Right to free movement and residence: a right of free movement and residence throughout the Union and the right to work in any position (including national civil services with the exception of those posts in the public sector that involve the exercise of powers conferred by public law and the safeguard of general interests of the State or local authorities (Article 21) for which however there is no one single definition);
- Voting in European elections: a right to vote and stand in elections to the European Parliament, in any EU member state (Article 22)
- Voting and running in municipal elections: a right to vote and stand in local elections in an EU state other than their own, under the same conditions as the nationals of that state (Article 22)
- Right to consular protection: a right to protection by the diplomatic or consular authorities of other Member States when in a non-EU Member State, if there are no diplomatic or consular authorities from the citizen's own state (Article 23)
  - This is due to the fact that not all member states maintain embassies in every country in the world (some countries have only one embassy from an EU state).
- Petitioning Parliament and the Ombudsman: the right to petition the European Parliament and the right to apply to the European Ombudsman to bring to his attention any cases of poor administration by the EU institutions and bodies, with the exception of the legal bodies (Article 24)
- Language rights: the right to apply to the EU institutions in one of the official languages and to receive a reply in that same language (Article 24)

=== Free movement rights ===
Article 21 Freedom to move and reside

Article 21 (1) of the Treaty on the Functioning of the European Union states that

Every citizen of the Union shall have the right to move and reside freely within the territory of the Member States, subject to the limitations and conditions laid down in this Treaty and by the measures adopted to give it effect.

The European Court of Justice has remarked that,

EU Citizenship is destined to be the fundamental status of nationals of the Member States

The ECJ has held that this Article confers a directly effective right upon citizens to reside in another Member State. Before the case of Baumbast, it was widely assumed that non-economically active citizens had no rights to residence deriving directly from the EU Treaty, only from directives created under the Treaty. In Baumbast, however, the ECJ held that (the then) Article 18 of the EC Treaty granted a generally applicable right to residency, which is limited by secondary legislation, but only where that secondary legislation is proportionate. Member States can distinguish between nationals and Union citizens but only if the provisions satisfy the test of proportionality. Migrant EU citizens have a "legitimate expectation of a limited degree of financial solidarity... having regard to their degree of integration into the host society" Length of time is a particularly important factor when considering the degree of integration.

The ECJ's case law on citizenship has been criticised for subjecting an increasing number of national rules to the proportionality assessment. Also, the right to free movement is not fully available to certain groups of Union citizens because of the various hurdles they face in real life. For example, transgender EU citizens face problems getting identity documents and going through identity checks, reuniting with their family members and accompanying children, as well as accessing social assistance. The scale of those issues gives grounds that only a limited form of EU citizenship is available to transgender people.

Article 45 Freedom of movement to work

Article 45 of the Treaty on the Functioning of the European Union states that

1. Freedom of movement for workers shall be secured within the Union.
2. Such freedom of movement shall entail the abolition of any discrimination based on nationality between workers of the Member States as regards employment, remuneration and other conditions of work and employment.

State employment reserved exclusively for nationals varies between member states. For example, training as a barrister in Britain and Ireland is not reserved for nationals, while the corresponding French course qualifies one as a 'juge' and hence can only be taken by French citizens. However, it is broadly limited to those roles that exercise a significant degree of public authority, such as judges, police, the military, diplomats, senior civil servants or politicians. Note that not all Member States choose to restrict all of these posts to nationals.

Much of the existing secondary legislation and case law was consolidated in the Citizens' Rights Directive 2004/38/EC on the right to move and reside freely within the EU.

Limitations

New member states may undergo transitional regimes for Freedom of movement for workers, during which their nationals only enjoy restricted access to labour markets in other member states. EU member states are permitted to keep restrictions on citizens of the newly acceded countries for a maximum of seven years after accession. For the EFTA states (Iceland, Lichtenstein, Norway and Switzerland), the maximum is nine years.

Following the 2004 enlargement, three "old" member states—Ireland, Sweden and the United Kingdom—decided to allow unrestricted access to their labour markets. By December 2009, all but two member states—Austria and Germany—had completely dropped controls. These restrictions too expired on 1 May 2011.

Following the 2007 enlargement, all pre-2004 member states except Finland and Sweden imposed restrictions on Bulgarian and Romanian citizens, as did two member states that joined in 2004: Malta and Hungary. As of November 2012, all but 8 EU countries have dropped restrictions entirely. These restrictions too expired on 1 January 2014. Norway opened its labour market in June 2012, while Switzerland kept restrictions in place until 2016.

Following the 2013 enlargement, some countries implemented restrictions on Croatian nationals following the country's EU accession on 1 July 2013. As of March 2021, all EU countries have dropped restrictions entirely.

== Acquisition ==
There is no common EU policy on the acquisition of European citizenship as it is supplementary to national citizenship. (EC citizenship was initially granted to all nationals of European Community member states in 1994 by the Maastricht treaty concluded between the member states of the European community under international law, this changed into citizenship of the European Union in 2007 when the European Community changed its legal identity to be the European Union. Many more people became EU citizens when each new EU member state was added and, at each point, all the existing member states ratified the adjustments to the treaties to allow the creation of those extra citizenship rights for the individual. European citizenship is also generally granted at the same time as national citizenship is granted). Article 20 (1) of the Treaty on the Functioning of the European Union states that:

"Citizenship of the Union is hereby established. Every person holding the nationality of a Member State shall be a citizen of the Union. Citizenship of the Union shall be additional to and not replace national citizenship."

While nationals of Member States are citizens of the union, "It is for each Member State, having due regard to Union law, to lay down the conditions for the acquisition and loss of nationality." As a result, there is a great variety in rules and practices with regard to the acquisition and loss of citizenship in EU member states. Applying for citizenship can be complex and may require instructing a specialist lawyer. The lack of harmonisation for naturalisation of non-EU citizens has been criticised.

=== Exceptions for overseas territories ===
In practice this means that a member state may withhold EU citizenship from certain groups of citizens, most commonly in overseas territories of member states outside the EU.

A previous example was for the United Kingdom. Owing to the complexity of British nationality law, a 1982 declaration by Her Majesty's Government defined who would be deemed to be a British "national" for European Union purposes:

- British citizens, as defined by Part I of the British Nationality Act 1981.
- British subjects, within the meaning of Part IV of the British Nationality Act 1981, but only if they also possessed the 'right of abode' under British immigration law.
- British overseas territories citizens who derived their citizenship by a connection to Gibraltar.

This declaration therefore excluded from EU citizenship various historic categories of British citizenship generally associated with former British colonies, such as British Overseas Citizens, British Nationals (Overseas), British protected persons and any British subject who did not have the 'right of abode' under British immigration law.

In 2002, with the passing of the British Overseas Territories Act 2002, EU citizenship was extended to almost all British overseas territories citizens when they were automatically granted full British citizenship (with the exception of those with an association to the British sovereign base areas of Akrotiri and Dhekelia on the Island of Cyprus). This had effectively granted them full EU citizenship rights, including free movement rights, although only residents of Gibraltar had the right to vote in European Parliament elections. In contrast, British citizens in the Crown Dependencies of Jersey, Guernsey and the Isle of Man had always been considered to be EU citizens but, unlike residents of the British overseas territories, were prohibited from exercising EU free movement rights under the terms of the British Accession Treaty if they had no other connection with the UK (e.g. they had lived in the UK for five years, were born in the UK, or had parents or grandparents born in the UK) and had no EU voting rights. (see Guernsey passport, Isle of Man passport, Jersey passport).

Another example are the residents of Faroe Islands of Denmark who, though in possession of full Danish citizenship, are outside the EU and are explicitly excluded from EU citizenship under the terms of the Danish Accession Treaty. This is in contrast to residents of the Danish territory of Greenland who, whilst also outside the EU as a result of the 1984 Greenland Treaty, do receive EU citizenship as this was not specifically excluded by the terms of that treaty (see Faroe Islands and the European Union; Greenland and the European Union).

==== Greenland ====
Although Greenland withdrew from the European Communities in 1985, the autonomous territory within the Kingdom of Denmark remains associated with the European Union, being one of the overseas countries and territories of the EU. The relationship with the EU means that all Danish citizens, where citizens of Greenland are citizens of Denmark, residing in Greenland are EU citizens. This allows Greenlanders to move and reside freely within the EU. This contrasts with Danish citizens living in the Faroe Islands who are excluded from EU citizenship.

=== Summary of member states' nationality laws ===
This is a summary of nationality laws for each of the twenty-seven EU member states as of December 2017.

Member State	Acquisition by birth	Acquisition by descent	Acquisition by marriage or civil partnership	Acquisition by naturalisation	Multiple nationality permitted
Austria	People born in Austria: at least one of whose married parents is an Austrian citizen; out of wedlock and whose mother is Austrian citizen; who is foundling and is found out under the age of 6 months	Austrian nationality is acquired by descent under one of the following conditions: Conditions: born to Austrian parents; born after 9 January 1983 and if parents are married at the time of birth, Austrian citizenship of either the mother or the father is sufficient; born before or on 9 January 1983: father must have been an Austrian citizen; children born to an Austrian mother married to a non-Austrian father do not qualify. If parents are not married, however, a father cannot pass on Austrian citizenship, whereas a mother can; should the parents happen to marry at some time after birth, citizenship is automatically granted to child retroactively. If the child is over 14 at that time, child's consent is needed.	6 years' residence if married for at least 5 years (and general citizenship conditions are met, including German language proficiency)	6 years' residence if born in Austria, citizen of another EEC country, or "exceptionally integrated"; depending on fulfilment of other conditions, up to 30 years' residence; 10 years' residence for refugees	Only allowed with special permission or if dual citizenship was obtained at birth (binational parents [one Austrian, one foreign] or birth in a jus-soli country such as USA and Canada)
Belgium	People born in Belgium who: are stateless; are foundlings; lose any other nationality before 18; have a parent born in Belgium; have a birth or adopted parent resident in Belgium for at least 5 of the past 10 years	Belgian nationality is acquired by descent under one of the following conditions: People with a Belgian parent	5 years' cohabitation in Belgium	Foreigners can obtain nationality by declaration at their municipality of residence if they have a permanent right to reside in Belgium and satisfy either of the following: 5 years' continuous lawful residence, subject to language, economic, and social integration criteria; 10 years' continuous, lawful residence, subject only to a language and integration requirement; 5 years' continuous, lawful residence for retired, handicapped, or disabled people; Foreigners can also petition the federal government for naturalization by the Chamber of Representatives without a formal residence requirement if they demonstrate exceptional merits in art, science, culture, or sport.	Yes
Bulgaria	People born in Bulgaria who: are stateless; are foundlings	Bulgarian nationality is acquired by descent under one of the following conditions: Conditions: At least one parent is a Bulgarian citizen; Any person of Bulgarian ethnicity; Also, member of a historical Bulgarian ethnic community (e.g. in Moldova, North Macedonia, Ukraine) (no limit on number of generations).	The applicant should be at least 18 years old; have permission for permanent or for long-term residence in Bulgaria since at least 3 years; have not been investigated or sentenced by the Bulgarian authorities; have income or occupation; be able to speak and write in Bulgarian; renounce previous citizenship (not applicable to citizens of the EU and EEA countries, Switzerland and countries with reciprocity agreement with Bulgaria; dual citizenship is allowed for them); have marriage to Bulgarian citizen since at least 3 years and the marriage is actual.	The applicant should be at least 18 years old; have permission for permanent or for long-term residence in Bulgaria since at least 5 years; have not been investigated or sentenced by the Bulgarian authorities; have income or occupation; be able to speak and write in Bulgarian; renounce previous citizenship (not applicable to citizens of the EU and EEA countries, Switzerland and countries with reciprocity agreement with Bulgaria; dual citizenship is allowed for them).	Yes – for Bulgarian citizens by birth; Yes – for naturalised citizens of the EU and EEA countries, Switzerland and countries with reciprocity agreement with Bulgaria
Croatia	People born in Croatia who: have least one parent who is a Croatian citizen; are foundlings (but such citizenship can be revoked if later found parents were foreign citizens)	Croatian nationality is acquired by descent under one of the following conditions: Conditions: through parentage (right of blood) by proving Croatian descent or ethnicity; born in Croatia to at least one parent who is a Croatian citizen; born abroad to at least one parent who is a Croatian citizen; birth must be registered at an authorized authority in Croatia before child reaches 18 years of age; born abroad to a Croatian parent if child would otherwise end up stateless; by adoption by parents who are Croatian citizens	8 years' residence (can be shortened)	8 years' residence; sufficient knowledge of Croatian language	Yes (if a Croatian citizen by descent/origin); No (if a naturalised Croatian citizen, unless applying by 'privileged naturalisation' (e.g. descendants of Croatian emigrants); Citizens with multiple citizenships are treated as exclusively Croatian citizens by law.
Cyprus	People born in Cyprus who: are stateless; are foundlings	Cypriot nationality is acquired by descent under one of the following conditions: Conditions: born to Greek Cypriot parent(s); born to Turkish Cypriot parent(s) after 1974 whose parent(s) was/were citizen of the Republic prior to 1974; Turkish Cypriots who have lost their citizenship after the occupation in 1974; born to a Turkish Cypriot parent and a Turkish parent if the Turkish parent is not a settler after 1974 (marriage must not have taken place in Northern Cyprus after 1974)	3 years' residence	7 years' residence	Yes
Czech Republic	People born in the Czech Republic: who are foundlings; whose parents are both stateless, and at least one of whom is a Czech permanent resident	People who have at least one parent with Czech citizenship (at the time of the person's birth). Whether a person is born in the Czech Republic or elsewhere is irrelevant.; Those with at least one parent or grandparent who lost their Czech or Czechoslovak citizenship on or before 31 December 2013 may also apply for Czech citizenship by declaration also known as citizenship by descent, in which case they must prove the loss of their ancestor's citizenship by a US naturalization certificate, a court order from the Communist era that stripped their ancestor of their citizenship, or a marriage certificate if their ancestor was a Czechoslovak woman who married a foreigner before 24 June 1947 (women automatically lost their Czechoslovak citizenship by marriage to a foreigner according to the Emigrant Patent of 1832 from Austrian law that was in effect until 23 June 1947).	2 years' residence in the country if married or in a same-sex registered partnership and the holder of a permanent residence permit at the date of the application (still must prove other requirements for naturalization, including the language requirement and social integration.)	Holders of a Czech permanent residence permit for at least 5 years (or 3 years for EU citizens), with real/factual residence in Czechia totaling at least half the relevant period (absences not exceeding 2 months (or 6 months for serious reasons) not being relevant); Holders of a Czech permanent residence permit (at the date of the application), and lawfully resident in Czechia for 10 years, with real/factual residence in Czechia totalling at least 5 years (absences not exceeding 2 months (or 6 months for serious reasons) not being relevant); Holders of a Czech permanent residence permit (at the date of the application) and whose naturalization would prove to be significant for the Czech Republic in terms of science, education, culture, sports, or other reasons that are in the interests of the Czech Republic. All the applicant has to prove for this route is a clean criminal record and a letter from a state institution stating why they should be awarded Czech citizenship. No language requirement in this case.	Yes, effective 1 January 2014
Denmark	People born in Denmark who: are foundlings	People who have at least one parent with Danish citizenship.	6 years' residence if married for at least 3 years	9 years' residence (holders of a permanent residence permit); 8 years' residence (refugees and stateless People); 2 years' residence (citizens of a Nordic country, i.e. Finland, Iceland, Norway and Sweden); Have a relatively advanced knowledge of the Danish language (equivalent to B2 CEFR).	Yes, effective 1 September 2015
Estonia	People born in Estonia who: are foundlings	People who have at least one parent with Estonian citizenship.	No (unless married to an Estonian citizen before 26 February 1992)	8 years' residence	Estonia does not recognise multiple citizenship. However, Estonian citizens by descent cannot be deprived of their Estonian citizenship, and are de facto allowed to have multiple citizenship.
Finland	People born in Finland who: are stateless, or; are foundlings; (Possibility to obtain citizenship by declaration exists for inborn aliens who have lived a major part of their childhood in Finland.)	Finnish nationality is acquired by descent from a Finnish mother, and from a Finnish father under one of the following conditions: Conditions: the child's father is a Finnish citizen and the parents are married; the child's father is a Finnish citizen, the child was born in Finland out of wedlock and the father's paternity is established; the child's father who died before the child was born was a Finnish citizen and who was married to the child's mother at the time of his death; or; the child's father, who died before the birth of the child, was a Finnish citizen and the child was born in Finland out of wedlock and the father's paternity was established.; a child born out of wedlock to a Finnish father outside Finland can get citizenship by declaration, if paternity is established.	Minimum residence requirement of five years of residence.	Eight years of continuous residence (or a total of seven years of residence since age 15) in Finland; and; knowledge of at least one of Finnish, Swedish, or Finnish sign language.; Reductions apply under certain conditions.	Yes
France	At birth, People born in France who: Are stateless.; Aged 13–16, upon the parent's request, having resided habitually in France since the age of 8.; Aged 16–18, upon their own request, having resided in France for 5 years (continuously or discontinuously) since the age of 11.; Aged 18, automatically for People born in France, having resided in France for 5 years (continuously or discontinuously) since the age of 11.	French nationality is acquired by descent under one of the following conditions: Through parentage (right of blood): The child (legitimate or natural) is French if at least one parent is French.	4 years' marriage; also, after 5 years outside France	Naturalisation conditions: 5 years of continuous residence.; This condition is reduced to 2 years for: People who have completed successfully 2 years of higher education in a French school/university.; People who have made exceptional contributions to France (civil, scientific, economic, cultural, sports).; The continuous residence condition is waived for: People who have served in the French military.; People who are refugees in France.; People for whom French is their mother tongue or who have been enrolled for 5 years in a French-language institution in a country where the official language or one of the official languages is French.	Yes
Germany	People born in Germany, if at least one parent has resided in Germany for at least 5 years and holds a permanent residence permit	German nationality is acquired by descent under one of the following conditions: Through parentage (right of blood); Member of recognised historical German community abroad (e.g. in the Balkans, Kazakhstan); Also granted to children/grandchildren of those deprived of citizenship by the Nuremberg Laws	2 years of marriage and 3 years of residence in Germany	5 years' residence; Proficiency in German; Sufficient finances; All conditions above, including residence, waived for victims of Nazi persecution	Yes, effective 27 June 2024
Greece	People born in Greece who: have a parent born in Greece; are foundlings; are stateless	Greek nationality is acquired by descent under one of the following conditions: Member of recognised historical Greek community abroad in countries of ex-USSR; Ethnic Greek of different citizenship accepted to military academies, or inscribes to serve to the army, or enlists as a volunteer in time of war; Child or grandchild of a Greek Citizen	3 years of continuous residence in Greece and has an offspring from the marriage	10 years' residence in the last 12 years; 5 years' residence in the last 12 years for refugees; Sufficient knowledge of Greek language, Greek history, and Greek culture in general; Athlete of an Olympic Sport, with 5 years' residence in the last 12 years, who fulfills the conditions of being a member of the Greek National Team of that sport, as these are stated by the international laws for that sport	Yes
Hungary	People born in Hungary who: are foundlings; are stateless	Hungarian nationality is acquired by descent under one of the following conditions: At least one parent is a Hungarian citizen; Any person of Hungarian ethnicity, which has to be proven by; 1. sufficient level of Hungarian language 2. demonstrating at least one ancestor born in the Kingdom of Hungary (no limit on number of generations).	3 years of residence in Hungary and 3 years of marriage to a Hungarian citizen, or; 5 years of marriage to a Hungarian citizen and has offspring from the marriage, or; 10 years of marriage to a Hungarian citizen	After 8 years and meeting conditions of good character; After 5 years if; born in Hungary; resided in Hungary in their pupillage; stateless; After 3 years if; married to a Hungarian citizen; has a minor child that is Hungarian citizen; adopted by a Hungarian citizen; refugee in Hungary	Yes
(Republic of Ireland) Ireland	People born in Ireland: are automatically an Irish citizen if he or she is not entitled to the citizenship of any other country.; entitled to be an Irish citizen if at least one parent is: an Irish citizen (or someone entitled to be an Irish citizen).; a resident of the island of Ireland who is entitled to reside in either the Republic or Northern Ireland without any time limit on that residence.; a legal resident of the island of Ireland for three out of the 4 years preceding the child's birth.	Irish nationality is acquired by descent under one of the following conditions: if at the time of birth, at least one parent was an Irish citizen.; if you have an Irish citizen grandparent born on the island of Ireland. The parent would have automatically been an Irish citizen. Grandchild can secure citizenship by registering themselves in the Foreign Births Register. Citizenship gained via the Foreign Births Register can only be passed on to children born after the parent themselves were registered.	3 years of marriage or civil partnership to an Irish citizen. Three-years of residency out of the most recent five-year period is required.	5 years of residency in Ireland with a "non-temporary" purpose within the preceding nine years, of which 1 (one) year immediately before application; The residency period can be waived, in the discretion of the Minister of Justice, for a person of "Irish descent or associations".	Naturalised Irish citizens cannot obtain any more citizenships than they currently have unless this new citizenship is obtained by marriage or civil partnership, as this will result in the cancellation of the naturalisation papers. Naturalised citizens can have dual nationality with countries they were a citizen of prior to naturalising as Irish. There are no restrictions on dual nationality for those who obtained Irish citizenship by any method that does not involve a naturalisation certificate (e.g citizens by birth or descent). See also Irish Nationality Law.
Italy	People born in Italy who: are foundlings; are stateless	Italian nationality is acquired by descent under one of the following conditions: Conditions: (Rules are in place that permit the recognition of Italian nationality for many members of the Italian diaspora, even generations after departure. The rules are complex.); Citizenship was accorded ethnic Italians born in the territory only in/after 1863.; After this, Italian citizen fathers could pass down citizenship.; Mothers pass down citizenship only for children born in/after 1948.; A child gaining another citizenship by birth may also gain Italian citizenship by parentage, with no interference. If such a child is an Italian citizen, he/she can pass on citizenship subject to the rules above, like any other Italian citizen.; A person naturalising to a foreign state loses the right to pass on citizenship to any children he/she may have after naturalisation.; A father's later naturalisation also retroactively annulled the child's citizenship if the child was born before 1910.	2 years of legal residence in Italy (3 years if living abroad) through naturalisation (as of 2018, the spouse must prove Italian language ability at B1 level for JM citizenship)	10 years' residence, no criminal record and sufficient financial resources. However, this reduced, if: 7 years' residence for children adopted by Italian citizens; 5 years' residence for refugees or stateless individuals; 4 years' residence for EU member states nationals but requires permanent residency which is typically issued after 5 years; 3 years' residence for descendants of Italian grandparents and for foreigners born in Italy; Knowledge of Italian language (no lower than B1).	Yes
Latvia	People born in Latvia who:	Latvian nationality is acquired by descent under one of the following conditions:	No	After 5 years of permanent residence	Starting from 1 October 2013 the following are eligible to have dual citizenship with Latvia: citizens of member states of the EU, NATO and EFTA (Iceland, Liechtenstein, Norway, Switzerland); citizens of Australia, Brazil, New Zealand; citizens of the countries that have had mutual recognition of dual citizenship with Latvia; people who were granted dual citizenship by the Cabinet of Ministers of Latvia; people of Latvian or Livonian ethnicity or exiles registering citizenship of Latvia; people who applied for dual citizenship before the previous Latvian Citizenship law (1995).
Lithuania	People born in Lithuania who: are stateless.	Lithuanian nationality is acquired by descent under one of the following conditions: at least one parent is a Lithuanian citizen; at least one direct ancestor was a Lithuanian citizen during the 1918–1940 period.	7 years of permanent residence and demonstrating Lithuanian language ability	10 years of continuous residence (plus demonstrating Lithuanian language ability, passing the Constitution exam, having no criminal record)	No, unless: Conditions: the non-Lithuanian citizenship is obtained by birth (acquiring parents' citizenships) or birth in a jus-soli country such as USA and Canada); the non-Lithuanian citizenship cannot be renounced; the Lithuanian citizen or his/her ancestors left Lithuania between 1918 and 1990; the Lithuanian citizenship is acquired via the way of exception; the Lithuanian citizenship is obtained by naturalisation by a refugee
Luxembourg	People born in Luxembourg who: are stateless, or; are foundlings, or; have a parent born in Luxembourg		3 years of marriage to a Luxembourgish citizen if residing outside Luxembourg, or; Immediate naturalisation, if residing in Luxembourg and married to a Luxembourgish citizen	5 years' residence, including 12 months continuous residence immediately preceding the citizenship application, and pass certificates for a test/course on the Luxembourgish language (Sproochentest) and Luxembourgish society and government	Yes
Malta	People born in Malta between 21 September 1964 and 31 July 1989; People born outside Malta between 21 September 1964 and 31 July 1989 to a father with Maltese citizenship through birth in Malta, registration or naturalisation; People born on or after 1 August 1989, inside or outside Malta, to at least one parent with Maltese citizenship through birth in Malta, registration or naturalisation	Maltese nationality is acquired by descent under the following condition: Direct descendant, second or subsequent generation, born abroad of an ascendant who was born in Malta of a parent who was also born in Malta.	5 years of marriage to a Maltese citizen (if de jure or de facto separated, then still living together five years after the marriage) or a widow/widower of a Maltese citizen five years after the marriage	5 years of residence or; citizenship-by-investment program	Yes
Netherlands	People born in Netherlands who: see: "Dutch by birth"	Dutch nationality is acquired by descent under one of the following conditions: People with a Dutch parent	3 years of residence and demonstrating Dutch language ability	After 5 years uninterrupted residence, with continuous registration in the municipal register and a "non-temporary" purpose of stay, or 10 years' total residence with the preceding two years uninterrupted, and language and integration criteria satisfied	No, unless: Conditions: the non-Dutch citizenship is obtained by birth (through a parent with non-Dutch citizenship or birth in a jus soli country); the non-Dutch citizenship is acquired through jus matrimonii (acquired automatically through marriage) or is obtained by naturalisation from the country of the spouse; the non-Dutch citizenship is obtained by naturalisation and the person has lived in the naturalised country for at least five years before turning 18; Dutch citizenship is obtained by naturalisation when married to or in a partnership (registered or de facto) with a Dutch national; Dutch citizenship is obtained by naturalisation by a refugee; Dutch citizenship is obtained by naturalisation and the person is unable to renounce his current nationality due to various reasons (military service, high renunciation fees, or prohibited from renouncing by the country's laws) or has "objective and compelling reasons", as judged by the immigration service, for not renouncing their current nationality; Dutch citizenship is obtained by naturalisation and the person is a citizen of a country that is not recognised by the Netherlands; Dutch citizenship is obtained by naturalisation by someone born in the Kingdom of The Netherlands (the person does not need to have lived in the Kingdom their entire life); Dutch citizenship is obtained by naturalisation as a minor.; Dutch citizenship is obtained through an option procedure.; People over 18 with multiple nationalities must live in the Kingdom of the Netherlands or the EU for at least one year out of every thirteen years, or receive a Dutch passport or a nationality certificate once every thirteen years.
Poland	A child born to a Polish parent.; Children born or found in Poland acquire Polish citizenship when both parents are unknown, or when their citizenship cannot be established, or if determined to be stateless.	Polish nationality is acquired by descent under one of the following conditions: Conditions: Certain descendants of Polish citizens, even after multiple generations, can apply for recognition: Polish citizenship begins 1920.; Acquisition of foreign citizenship prior to 1951 led to the loss of Polish nationality.; After this, any Polish citizen transmits nationality to all his/her children and nationality is only lost by explicit request.; These children can pass on nationality as well.; Descendants of Polish-language/ethnic People in some neighbouring countries including Belarus, Lithuania, Russia, Kazakhstan, Ukraine et al., can apply for Karta Polaka which gives many of the same rights as Polish citizenship but serves as a substitute when acquisition of Polish citizenship would result in the loss of the person's earlier citizenship.	3 years of marriage to a Polish citizen and 2 years' residence in Poland as a permanent resident, or; Grant of citizenship by presidential decree (discretionary with no set conditions for grant)	3 years of residence with permanent residence permit card under the condition of speaking the Polish language as proven by certificate; 2 years of residence with permanent residence permit card acquired on the basis of marriage with Polish citizen and under the condition of speaking the Polish language proven by a certificate; 1 year of residence with permanent residence permit card acquired on the basis of Polish ethnicity or by possessing Pole's Card and under the condition of speaking the Polish language proven by a certificate; 10 years of lawful residence (under any type of residence permit/visas) and possession of permanent residence card under the condition of speaking the Polish language as proven by a certificate; Grant of citizenship by presidential decree (discretionary with no set conditions for grant)	Yes, but in Poland, Polish identification must be used and the dual citizen is treated legally as only Polish
Portugal	A person who is not descended from a Portuguese citizen becomes a Portuguese citizen at the moment of birth, by the effect of the law itself, if that person was born in Portugal and: would otherwise be stateless; is a foundling; is born to non-citizen birth parents one of whom, at least, is resident in Portugal at the time of the birth (independently of the legality of such residency), but only if that parent resident in Portugal was also born in Portugal, and provided that such residency in Portugal is not due to service to a foreign State.; A person who is not descended from a Portuguese citizen and who is not covered by the conditions for automatic attribution of nationality by birth in Portugal set out above, has a right to declare that he or she wants to become a Portuguese citizen, and that person becomes a natural-born Portuguese citizen, with effects retroactive to the moment of birth, upon the registration of such declaration in the Portuguese Civil Registry (by application made by that person, once of age, or by a legal representative of that person, during minority), if that person was born in Portugal and: had, at the date of birth, a birth parent legally resident in Portugal for at least 5 years, either enjoying Treaty rights (namely, the European Union freedom of movement, for citizens of other Member States of the Union, or the special conditions for settlement in Portugal by citizens of the Member States of the Community of Portuguese Language Countries), or in possession of any of the categories of residence permit issued by the Portuguese State, but provided that such parent's residency in Portugal was not due to service to a foreign State.	Portuguese nationality is transmitted by descent under one of the following conditions: Conditions: a child becomes a Portuguese national at birth, and nationality is recognised by the law itself if at least one of the parents of that child is a Portuguese national and the birth takes place in Portugal or in a territory administered by Portugal. (That form of transmission of nationality, combining descent from a Portuguese parent and birth in Portugal is the main form of transmission of the Portuguese nationality). No registration is necessary for the transmission of nationality in that case.; Nationality is also recognised by the law itself at birth to a child born outside Portugal, provided that the said child has at least one Portuguese parent, and the birth takes place outside Portugal due to the parent's service to the Portuguese State abroad. No registration is necessary for the transmission of nationality in that case, Nationality retroactive to the moment of birth is recognised by the law to a person born outside Portugal if at least one of the birth parents is a Portuguese national, but only if that person's birth is registered before the Portuguese Civil Registry or if a declaration by that person, stating that he or she wants to be a Portuguese citizen, is lodged with the Portuguese Civil Registry. The registration of the birth can be applied for, as a matter of right, at any time during the person's life, by the parents, by another legal guardian of a minor, or by the person himself, if the person is already of age (18 years old or older), and also by the legal guardian of an incapacitated adult. The registration of the birth or of the declaration, can be made at any time during the person's life, but the descendants of that person cannot ask for the registration under this rule after that person is dead. Thus, if one generation is skipped, the next generation cannot register under this rule. Registration can be made either in Portugal or by means of a Portuguese Consulate abroad. If the registration is applied to by means of a Consulate, the Consulate processes the request and sends the necessary papers to the central registry office of the Portuguese Civil Registry in Lisbon. Given that the registration produces legal effects retroactive to the moment of birth, the person, once registered as a Portuguese citizen, is recognised by law as a natural born citizen. (Sons and daughters of that person, even if born before the moment of that person's registration, and even if born outside Portugal are therefore themselves able to apply for registration as Portuguese citizens, because their parent is a Portuguese citizen since birth. Accordingly, this form of transmission of nationality, combining descent and registration, allows for the transmission of Portuguese nationality by parentage from generation to generation indefinitely and as a matter of right, even if the members of the successive generations are born outside Portugal and never reside in Portugal, provided that registration is not skipped by one generation). Many descendants of Portuguese immigrants, especially in Brazil and other Lusophone countries, hold dual nationality, being recognised as natural born Portuguese citizens upon registration under that rule.; Nationality retroactive to the moment of birth is recognized by law upon registration to a grandson or granddaughter of a Portuguese citizen who, having demonstrated that he or she has an effective connection to the Portuguese national community, declares to the Portuguese Civil Registry his or her will to become a Portuguese citizen, provided that, at the time of such declaration, the person has had no criminal conviction for a crime punishable under Portuguese law with a prison term of 3 years or more. The effective connection to the Portuguese national community is assumed by the law itself in certain cases (legal residence in Portugal for three years with registration as a taxpayer and as a user of the national health service, plus knowledge of the Portuguese language, or legal residence in Portugal for five years), and in other cases (ownership of real estate in Portugal, or constant travel to Portugal, or membership of Portuguese cultural associations abroad, or legal residence in Portugal for less than three years, etc.) it needs to be evaluated by the Government by means of an administrative procedure submitted by the Registrar to the Justice Minister. Once connection to the national community is ascertained (either by the Registrar recognising that the law itself assumes such connection or by the decision of the Justice Minister) the interested person is then invited to register his or her birth at the Portuguese Civil Registry, and the attribution of nationality becomes a matter of right. The process becomes moot if the interested party does not follow through with the birth registration within six months of being notified to do so. Once the birth is registered, the interested person is thereafter recognized as a natural-born citizen. This form of attribution of nationality for grandchildren of Portuguese citizens, created in 2017, combining descent and registration of birth but requiring evidence of effective connection to the Portuguese community, is available for descendants of Portuguese nationals who otherwise would not be able to become natural-born citizens because the registration of one generation was missed. Because the nationality is retroactive to the moment of birth, sons and daughters of that new citizen, even if born before registration and outside Portugal, then become themselves able to be recognized as natural-born citizens as a matter of right, by having their births registered under the rule of registration for sons and daughters of Portuguese citizens.	A person married to a Portuguese national for at least 3 years can apply to be registered as a Portuguese national as a matter of right, provided that the registration is applied for during the marriage (and not after its dissolution by death or divorce). Nationality takes effect upon registration and is not retroactive, and is not lost by the dissolution of the marriage.	Naturalisation conditions: Naturalisation can be granted at the State's discretion to People who are of age and who reside in Portugal for at 10 years on a valid permit, provided that they demonstrate knowledge of the Portuguese language on A2 level and have never been convicted of a crime punishable under Portuguese law with a prison term of 3 years or more.; Naturalisation can be granted to People who do not reside in Portugal, or who do not satisfy the condition of residing in Portugal for at least five years on a valid permit, provided that the person applying is a second degree relative (grandson or granddaughter, or a sibling) of a Portuguese citizen.; the Portuguese Government can also grant naturalisation to foreigners who are of age and who meet neither the five-year legal residency requirement nor the knowledge of the Portuguese language requirement, provided that the person was a Portuguese national in the past, or that the applicant is held to be a descendant of Portuguese citizens, or a member of Portuguese communities abroad, or provided that the applicant is found to have rendered, or is expected to render in the future relevant services to the Portuguese State or to the national community.; Minors born in Portugal to foreign parents can by be granted Portuguese Nationality by the Government, if, at the time of the request made on their behalf by their legal representatives, they have completed the first cycle of the basic education in Portugal, and if one of the parents legally resides in Portugal for at least five years. The requirements of being of age at the time of the request and of legally residing in Portugal for at least six years are waived with respect to a minor meeting those conditions, but the minor must still demonstrate sufficient knowledge of the Portuguese language, and must not have been convicted to crimes that carry under Portuguese law a prison penalty of three years or more.; the Portuguese Government can also grant naturalisation to foreigners who prove that they descend from Portuguese Sephardic Jews and who demonstrate that they belong to a traditional Jewish Sephardic community of Portuguese origin; Nationality is granted as a matter of right (and not by naturalisation in the strict sense), but without retroactive effect, to a person who is a son or a daughter of someone who acquires Portuguese Nationality by naturalisation, provided that the person was a minor at the time of the parent's naturalisation, and provided that the person in question, either represented by his parents or by another legal guardian (during minority or incapacity), or by himself (once of age) applies to be registered as a Portuguese national.	Yes
Romania	People born in Romania who: are foundlings; have Romanian parents	Romanian nationality is acquired by descent under one of the following conditions: Conditions: People with a Romanian ancestor up to 3 generations back may be eligible for citizenship: People with at least one parent, grandparent or great-grandparent, born anytime before 1940 in a location that was in the Kingdom of Romania between 1918 and 1940 (including Bessarabia and Northern Bukovina) and can demonstrate competence in the Romanian language, are eligible for restoration of citizenship.; People with a parent or grandparent still registered as a Romanian citizen, may apply for clarification of their own citizenship. Romanian citizenship is NOT automatically lost by naturalisation to a foreign country.	5 years' residence in Romania	8 years' residence; 4 years' residence (EU citizens), but requires permanent residency which is typically issued after 5 years	Yes
Slovakia	People born in Slovakia: who are foundlings; whose parents are both stateless, and at least one of whom is a Slovak permanent resident	Slovak nationality is acquired by descent under the following condition: at least one of parents, grandparents or great-grandparents was a Czechoslovak citizen born in the territory of the Slovak Republic.	After 5 years' residence in Slovakia, and living in Slovakia without any immigration restrictions at the time of application	8 years' residence (5 years until a permanent residence is acquired plus 3 years of permanent residence)	Dual citizenship is only permitted to Slovak citizens who acquire a second citizenship by birth, through marriage, or whom have lived in the foreign country for which it will be acquired for 5 or more years, and to foreign nationals who gain Slovak citizenship.
Slovenia	A child born in Slovenia is a Slovenian citizen if either parent is a Slovenian citizen. Where the child is born outside Slovenia the child will be automatically Slovenian if: both parents are Slovenian citizens; or; one parent is Slovenian and the other parent is unknown, is of unknown citizenship or is stateless.; A person born outside Slovenia with one Slovenian parent who is not Slovenian automatically may acquire Slovenian citizenship through: an application for registration as a Slovenian citizen made at any time before age 36; or; taking up permanent residence in Slovenia before age 18.; Children adopted by Slovenian citizens may be granted Slovenian citizenship.	Slovenian nationality is acquired by descent under one of the following conditions: A person of "Slovenian origin" up to the fourth generation in direct descent or a former Slovenian citizen may be naturalised without any residence requirements.	A person who is married to a Slovenian citizen for at least two years may be naturalised after one year's residence in Slovenia	A total of 10 years' residence in Slovenia, including 5 years' continuous residence before the application	Dual citizenship is generally permitted in Slovenia; however, applicants for Slovenian citizenship by naturalisation must normally renounce any foreign citizenship (the requirement to renounce foreign citizenship may be waived upon special application).
Spain	People born in Spain who: are stateless; are foundlings	Children of Spanish citizens	1 year of marriage to a Spanish citizen and residence in Spain	10 years' residence; 5 years' residence (refugees); 2 years' residence (for nationals of Iberoamerica, Andorra, Philippines, Equatorial Guinea, Portugal, or if the individual is a Sephardi Jew); 1 year's residence (People born in Spain)	Yes (if a Spanish citizen by descent/origin); if naturalising in an Iberoamerican country, Spanish—and EU citizenship—is "dormant" until the return to Spain; see Multiple citizenship.; No (if a naturalised Spanish citizen, unless from Iberoamerica, Andorra, Philippines, Equatorial Guinea, Portugal or France)
Sweden	People born in Sweden who: are stateless, or; are foundlings (cancelled if parents found)	Swedish nationality is acquired by descent under one of the following conditions: Conditions: Person: whose mother is a Swedish citizen, or born in Sweden whose father is a Swedish citizen; whose father is a Swedish citizen and married to the mother (also later marriage)	3 years' marriage in case residing in Sweden, 10 years in case living abroad with a Swedish spouse and has 'strong ties' to Sweden, by family visits and such	5 years' normal residence permit (not the time limited residence/work permit/Study Permit) and must hold Swedish permanent residence permit at the time of applying or person with a visa intended for settlement in Sweden with 5 years' residence in Sweden.; 2 years if citizen of a Nordic country (i.e. Denmark, Finland, Iceland and Norway)	Yes

=== Availability to people with European ancestry ===
Given the substantial number of Europeans who emigrated throughout the world in the 19th and 20th centuries, and the extension of citizenship by descent, or jus sanguinis, by some EU member states to an unlimited number of generations of those emigrants' descendants, there are potentially many tens of millions or even hundreds of millions of people currently outside Europe who have a claim to citizenship in an EU member state and, by extension, to EU citizenship. There have also been extensive debates in European national legislatures on whether, and to what extent, to modify nationality laws of a number of countries to further extend citizenship to these groups of ethnic descendants, potentially dramatically increasing the pool of EU citizens further.

If these individuals were to overcome the bureaucratic hurdles of certifying their citizenship, they would enjoy freedom of movement to live anywhere in the EU, under the 1992 European Court of Justice decision Micheletti v Cantabria.

== Loss of EU citizenship due to member state withdrawal ==
The general rule for losing EU citizenship is that European citizenship is lost if member state nationality is lost, but the automatic loss of EU citizenship as a result of a member state withdrawing from the EU is the subject of debate.

One school of legal thought indicates that the Maastricht treaty created the European Union as a legal entity, it then also created the status of EU citizen which gave an individual relationship between the EU and its citizens, and a status of EU citizen. Clemens Rieder suggests a case can be made that "[n]one of the Member States were forced to confer the status of EU citizenship on their citizens but once they have, according to this argument, they cannot simply withdraw this status." In this situation, no EU citizen would involuntarily lose their citizenship due to their nation's withdrawal from the EU.

It was thought likely that only a court case before the European Court of Justice would be able to properly determine the correct legal position in this regard, as there is no definitive legal certainty in this area. For instance, on 7 February 2018, the District Court of Amsterdam decided to refer the matter to the European Court of Justice, while the state of the Netherlands appealed against this referral decision.

British citizens brought actions challenging the loss of their rights as EU citizens as a result of Brexit. In June, 2023, the European Court of Justice (ECJ) dismissed definitively those actions. After the withdrawal agreement came into force, British citizens lost their Union citizenship. The loss of citizenship was challenged by British nationals who were living abroad in an EU Member State but had never obtained nationality in that place of residence. The ECJ ultimately dismissed their legal challenge.

=== United Kingdom ===
As a result of the withdrawal of the United Kingdom from the European Union, the opinion of both the European Union and the British government has been that British citizens would lose their EU citizenship and EU citizens would lose their automatic right to stay in the UK. To account for the problems arising from this, a provisional agreement outlines the right of British citizens to remain in the EU (and vice versa) where they are resident in the Union on the day of the UK's withdrawal. EU citizens may remain in the UK post-Brexit if and only if they apply to EU Settlement Scheme. The only exception to this is Irish citizens, who are entitled to live and work in the United Kingdom under the Common Travel Area.

==== European Citizens' Initiatives to challenge Brexit ====
As a result of the Brexit referendum, there were three European Citizens' Initiatives that were registered which sought to protect the rights and/or status of British EU citizens. Out of these three initiatives, the one with the strongest legal argument was registered on 27 March 2017 and officially named "EU Citizenship for Europeans: United in Diversity in Spite of jus soli and jus sanguinis". It is clear that the initiative abides by the first school of thought mentioned above because the annexe that was submitted with the initiative clearly makes reference to Rieder's work. In an article titled "Extending [full] EU citizenship to UK nationals ESPECIALLY after Brexit" and published with the online magazine Politics Means Politics, the creator of the initiative argues that British nationals must keep their EU citizenship by detaching citizenship of the European Union from Member State nationality. Perhaps the most convincing and authoritative source that is cited in the article is the acting President of the European Court of Justice, Koen Lenaerts who published an article where he explains how the Court analyses and decides cases dealing with citizenship of the European Union. Both Lenaerts and the creator of the Initiative refer to rulings by the European Court of Justice which state that:

- "Citizenship of the Union is intended to be the fundamental status of nationals of the Member States" (inter alia: Grzelczyk, paragraph 31; Baumbast and R, paragraph 82; Garcia Avello, paragraph 22; Zhu and Chen, parag. 25; Rottmann, parag. 43; Zambrano, parag. 41, etc.)
- "Article 20 TFEU precludes national measures that have the effect of depriving citizens of the Union of the genuine enjoyment of the substance of the rights conferred by virtue of their status as citizens of the Union" (Inter alia: Rottmann, parag. 42; Zambrano, parag. 42; McCarthy, parag 47; Dereci, parag. 66; O and Others, parag. 45; CS, parag. 26; Chavez-Vilchez and Others, parag. 61, etc.)

Based on the argument presented by "EU Citizenship for Europeans" and its creator, Brexit is a textbook definition of a Member State depriving a European citizen of his or her rights as EU citizens, and therefore a legal act is necessary to protect not just rights but the status of EU citizen itself. Despite variances in interpretation of some points of law raised by the Initiative, the European Commission's decision to register the initiative confirms the strength and merit of the initiative's legal argument. On the other hand, the counter-argument is that citizenship of the Union is expressly conferred only upon nationals of Member States, and has been lost by UK nationals because the UK has ceased to be a Member State.

==== 2022 decision ====
On 9 June 2022, the Court of Justice of the European Union delivered its judgment in case C-673/20 EP. The decision clarified that all British nationals lost their EU citizenship after the UK's withdrawal. Although expected, the judgment was criticised in the media.

==== Associate citizenship ====
A proposal made first by Guy Verhofstadt, the European Parliament's Brexit negotiator, to help cover the rights of British citizens post-Brexit would see British citizens able to opt-out of the loss of EU citizenship as a result of the general clauses of the withdrawal agreement. This would allow visa-free working on the basis of their continuing rights as EU citizens. This, he termed, "associate citizenship". This has been discussed with the UK's negotiator David Davis. However, it was made clear by the British government that there would be no role for EU institutions concerning its citizens, effectively removing the proposal as a possibility.

== Danish opt-out ==
Denmark obtained four opt-outs from the Maastricht Treaty following the treaty's initial rejection in a 1992 referendum. The opt-outs are outlined in the Edinburgh Agreement and concern the EMU (as above), the Common Security and Defence Policy (CSDP), Justice and Home Affairs (JHA) and the citizenship of the European Union. The citizenship opt-out stated that European citizenship did not replace national citizenship; this opt-out was rendered meaningless when the Amsterdam Treaty adopted the same wording for all members. The policy of recent Danish governments has been to hold referendums to abolish these opt-outs, including formally abolishing the citizenship opt-out which is still legally active even if redundant.

== See also ==
- Charter of Fundamental Rights of the European Union
- European citizens' consultations
- European Citizens' Initiative
- Europe for Citizens
- Four Freedoms (European Union)
- National identity cards in the European Economic Area
- Naturalisation
- Passport of the European Union
- Visa requirements for the European Union citizens
