= European Association of History Educators =

International educational organization

The European Association of History Educators (EuroClio) was established in 1992 with the support of the Council of Europe. The NGO works as a European wide facilitator for innovation and progress in history Education. The organisation contributes not only to the development, but also on the actual implementation of regional, national and European long-term projects, which focus on establishing knowledge, experience and expertise in the countries by training and consulting teachers. EuroClio develops teaching materials, builds and maintains professional Networks and acts as advisor to governments, international organisations, NGOs, History Teacher Associations and other Organisations. EuroClio is supported by the Europe for Citizens Programme of the European Union and has, for many years, Official Participatory Status and is part of the EU Stake Holder's Network in Education and Training.

== Background ==
=== History ===
EuroClio was officially founded in 1993, but already in 1992, delegates from Denmark, Switzerland, Belgium, Portugal, Hungary, Estonia, the Netherlands, France, the United Kingdom, Finland, Lithuania, Luxembourg, Sweden and Norway (14 countries), representing 18 history Teachers Associations decided that a European organization was needed to support the learning and teaching of history by sharing and exchanging knowledge and professional experience. EuroClio was founded by Joke van der Leeuw-Roord. The immediate cause for the foundation of such an institute was the collapse of the Iron Curtain in 1989 and the dissolution of the Soviet Union in 1991. These events changed the scope and perspective of history and history education in Europe completely and for many countries, a European dimension in history education suddenly became possible and important for the future. History education is frequently used as a vehicle for political propaganda, hatred and aggression, but now the decision was made to renew contacts between East and West and reinforce a history education that could act as a tool to foster integration, peace and stability in Europe. From 1993 on, EuroClio grew rapidly and today it represents more than 60 member organizations from 46 (mostly) European countries, connecting 40,000 historians and history educators in primary, secondary and higher educational institutes.

=== Awards ===
EuroClio received the following international recognition:

- In 2014, the EuroClio programme "Sharing History, Cultural Dialogues" has been awarded the Grand Prize in Contest for The Best Projects of Cross-Border Cooperation in the category Education by the Congress of initiatives in Eastern Europe in Lublin.
- In 2012, the EuroClio programme “Historiana – Your Portal to the Past” has been awarded the Special Prize for European Collaboration in the creation of Educational Media by the MEDEA Awards.
- In 2011, EuroClio received Honorable Mention for the Intercultural Innovation Award.
- In 2011, the EuroClio programme “Historiana – Your Portal to the Past” has been awarded the World Aware Education Award by the North-South Centre of the Council of Europe.
- In 2009, EuroClio received in Brussels the Second Prize of European Economic and Social Council Award for Organised Civil Society by the European Economic and Social Committee (EESC).

== The organisation ==
=== Mission ===
The organization supports the development of responsible and innovative history, heritage and citizenship education by promoting critical thinking, mutual respect, peace, stability and democracy.

EuroClio focuses on three target areas:

- Intense professional capacity building and knowledge exchange, with a focus on the development of innovative and responsible high-quality teaching professionals and the development and implementation of contemporary, class-room applicable teaching materials.
- Dialogue, national, cross-community and trans-border networking and dissemination of information with the goal of maintaining and extending this network through all means available.
- Developing participatory and sustainable, professional civil society networks by establishing and empowering independent History Educators Associations in all European countries and beyond. These organisations act as multipliers of the EuroClio work on national levels.

=== Member Organisations ===
EuroClio has member organizations from: Albania, Armenia, Azerbaijan, Austria, Bosnia-Herzegovina, Bulgaria, Croatia, Cyprus, Czechia, Denmark, Estonia, United Kingdom, Finland, France, Germany, Georgia, Hungary, Iceland, Ireland, Italy, Lebanon, Lithuania, Latvia, Luxembourg, North Macedonia, Malta, Moldova, Montenegro, the Netherlands, Norway, Poland, Portugal, Romania, Serbia, Slovakia, Slovenia, Spain, Switzerland, Turkey and Ukraine (among others). A full overview of member organisations is available at

=== Secretariat ===
The EuroClio Secretariat is located in The Hague, Netherlands. The Secretariat is managed by Acting Executive Director Steven Stegers.

=== Association Board ===
EuroClio is governed by an international volunteer board that is elected annually by the general assembly. Since its foundation in 1992, EuroClio has had board members from Belgium, Cyprus, Denmark, Germany, Greece, Hungary, Iceland, Italy, Latvia, the Netherlands, Norway, Switzerland, Turkey, North Macedonia, Portugal, Slovenia, Ukraine, and the United Kingdom.

=== Affiliations ===
EuroClio is an affiliate of the following networks:

- LLLP, Lifelong Learning Platform.
- Council of Europe iNGO forum.
- Europeana Network.

EuroClio is an official partner of UNESCO.

== Activities ==
=== Teacher Training and Conferences ===
Each year, EuroClio organises an International Training and Development Course where, on average, History Educators from more than 35 countries meet, learn and discuss a variety of topics and good practice to broaden their perspectives. These Annual Conferences take place in different European countries and in close co-operation with local History Teachers’ Associations.

All EuroClio Teacher Training activities are in close co-operation with both local academics and institutes for history teacher education, and international experts to train history teachers how to use the most modern teaching methods in their classes. For example: history educators everywhere recognise the importance of ICT as a learning and communications tool, and want further training in how to develop these areas and how to extend their skills in using ICT to promote historical understanding and learning. EuroClio operates through the medium of English for international work, and in home languages with translations for the experts supporting projects and in developmental work.

Since its foundation, EuroClio has organised more than 30 International Conferences and more than 70 National and Regional Training and Development Courses.

=== Programmes ===
EuroClio implements several long term programmes:

- International Trainings provides cross-border professional capacity building for history, heritage and citizenship educators related to innovative and responsible history education.
- Historiana - Your Portal to the Past promotes digital literacy through history, heritage and citizenship education by means of an on-line multimedia tool, offering students multi-perspective, cross-border and comparative historical resources supplementing their national history teaching tools.

== Publications ==
Since its beginnings, EuroClio has been committed to developing resources for history educators and other professionals. Among these materials are teaching strategies and practices, guided courses, educational toolkits, podcasts, and articles.
