= Josef Magerl =

Austrian diplomat

Josef Magerl is an Austrian diplomat, who became the Permanent Representative of Austria to the Organisation for the Prohibition of Chemical Weapons on 31 August 2000.

== Professional career ==
Before his posting as Ambassador Extraordinary and Plenipotentiary to the Netherlands and to Luxembourg, Magerl served as the Head of the Department for Asia and Australia at the Federal Ministry of Foreign Affairs, from 1989 to 1996. Since entering the Austrian foreign service in 1966, Magerl has served Austria as a diplomat in the former USSR, the former Yugoslavia, Belgium, and the Syrian Arab Republic. Magerl has a PhD in law from the University of Vienna in Austria.

He represented Austrian citizens who took part in the European Citizens' Consultations.
