= Joke van der Leeuw-Roord =

Dutch historian (born 1949)

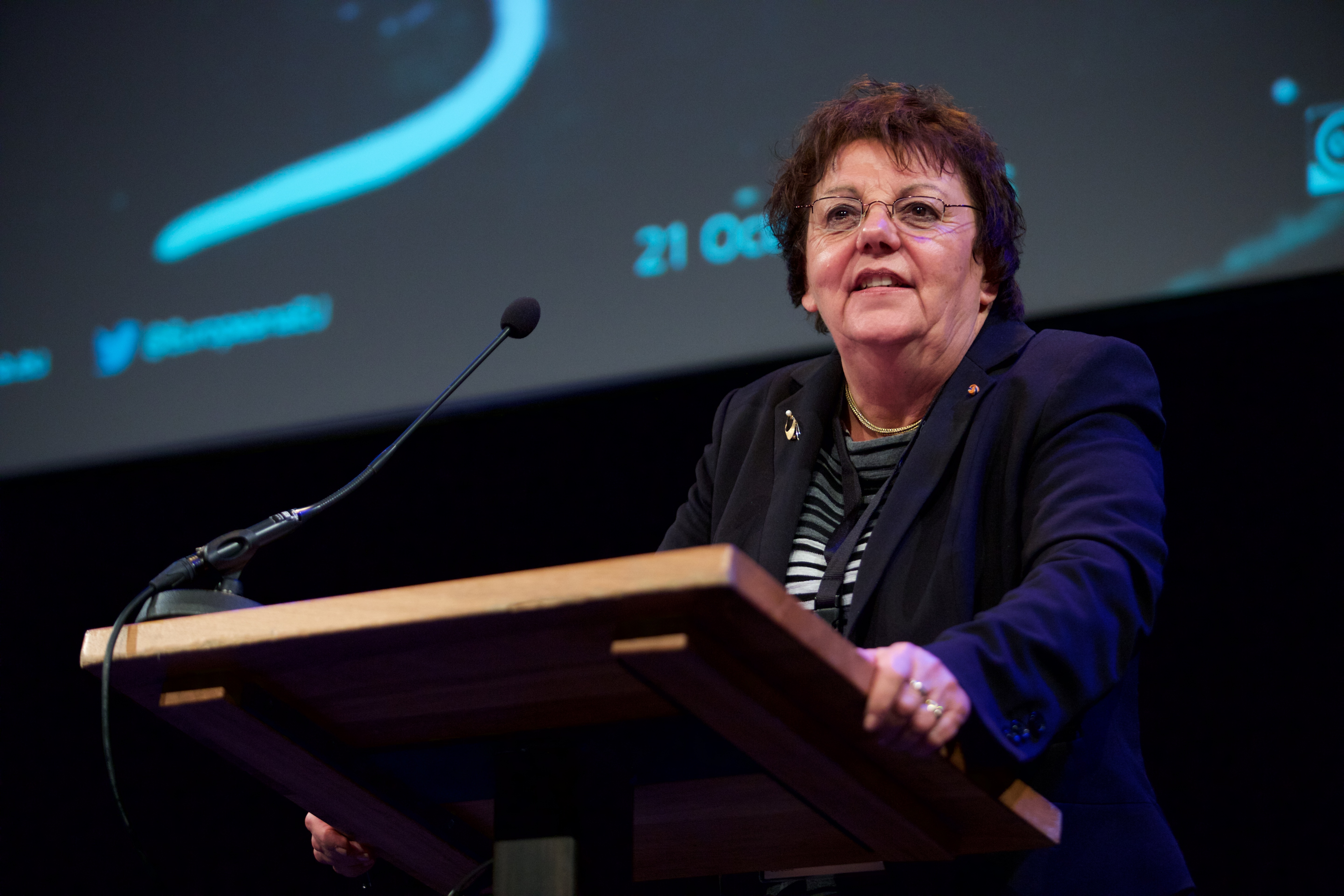
Joke van der Leeuw-Roord, 2015

Joke van der Leeuw-Roord (born 1949) is Founder and Special Advisor of EUROCLIO - The European Association of History Educators and is member of the Europeana Managing Board of the Europeana Association as well as Vice-Chair of the Europeana Foundation. She studied history at Groningen University in the Netherlands. She worked till 1993 as a history teacher, trainer and advisor. She was President of the Dutch History Teachers Association, and editor of the Magazine on the Learning and Teaching of History in the Netherlands. She was chair of the Committee which designed and implemented innovative national examinations for history and citizenship education.

She has since 1992 initiated and coordinated a multitude of national, trans-national projects amongst others in Albania, Belarus, Bulgaria, Bosnia-in-Herzegovina, Croatia, Cyprus, Czech Republic, Estonia, Georgia, Latvia, Macedonia, Montenegro, Romania, Russia, Serbia, Turkey and Ukraine. In these projects she has worked on professional capacity building, development of educational tools, implementation through training and the development of independent local networks and organizations promoting innovative and responsible history and citizenship education.

Joke van der Leeuw-Roord operates as consultant for the Council of Europe, UNESCO, OSCE, International Alert and the European Union. She is Member of the Advisory Board of the Georg Eckert Institute in Braunschweig (Germany), former Secretary General of the Steering Committee of the Lifelong Learning Platform (LLLP) Affiliated Research Associate of the Institute for Historical Culture at the Rotterdam Erasmus University and Mentor of WISE Learners

Joke van der Leeuw is the author of publications by the Koerberstiftung, UNESCO and many international journals on history and history education. She has been decorated in 2009 as Officer in the Order of Oranje-Nassau and honored with the Huib de Ruyter Award for History Education. She is Honorary Fellow of the Historical Association in the United Kingdom and Honorary Member of the Bulgarian, Estonian and Georgian History Educators Associations.
