= Grzelczyk v Centre Public d'Aide Sociale d'Ottignes-Louvain-la-Neuve =

Grzelczyk v Centre Public d'Aide Sociale d'Ottignies-Louvain-la-Neuve
- Court: European Court of Justice
- Citations: (2001) C-184/99, [2001] ECR I-6193

Keywords
- Free movement of citizens

Grzelczyk v Centre Public d'Aide Sociale d'Ottignies-Louvain-la-Neuve (2001) C-184/99 is an EU law case, concerning the free movement of citizens in the European Union.

== Facts ==
Rudy Grzelczyk was French, studying in Belgium, and supporting himself for 3 years of study. Directive 93/96 article 1, now the Citizens Rights Directive article 7(1)(c) required this. He applied for a minimum income, or "minimex" to fund the fourth and final year from CPAS. He was refused for not being Belgian. He was not a worker, but claimed he had a right as an EU citizen resident under TFEU art 21 and as a student under the Students Directive 93/96. This, however, required (now CRD art 7(1)(c)) that he had sufficient resources.

== Judgment ==
The Court of Justice, Grand Chamber, held that Grzelczyk was entitled to the minimex. Although CRD art 7(1)(c) required a student to have sufficient resources, there was no requirement to preclude students receiving social security. TFEU art 21 with art 18 precluded the Belgian law discriminating against Grzelczyk.

"Union citizenship is destined to be the fundamental status of nationals of the Member States, enabling those who find themselves in the same situation to enjoy the same treatment in law irrespective of their nationality, subject to such exceptions as are expressly provided for."

== See also ==
- European Union law
