= Baumbast and R v Secretary of State for the Home Department =

Baumbast and R v SS for the Home Department
- Court: European Court of Justice
- Citation: (2002) C-413/99, [2002] ECR I-7091

Keywords
- Free movement of citizens

Baumbast and R v Secretary of State for the Home Department (2002) C-413/99 is an EU law case, concerning the free movement of citizens in the European Union.

== Facts ==
Mr Baumbast's Colombian family claimed their residence should be renewed by the Home Office, despite the fact that Mr Baumbast was no longer working in the EU and did not have emergency health insurance. Mr Baumbast, a German married a Colombian with two children. He worked in the UK with his family for three years, and left to work in Asia and Africa. He provided for his family, who stayed in the UK. They got German health insurance and went there to get it. The Home Office refused to renew his family's permits. The UK court found that Mr Baumbast was neither a worker nor a person covered by the Citizenship Directive 2004/38, and that sickness insurance did not cover emergency treatment in the UK. The ECJ was asked whether he had an independent right of residence as an EU citizen under TFEU art 21.

In a joined case, R were the children of an American woman and a French husband who worked in the UK. They were divorced, the children living with the mother.

== Judgment ==
The Court of Justice held that Mr Baumbast and his family were not a burden on the UK state, so it would be disproportionate to refuse to recognise his Treaty-based right of residence simply because sickness insurance did not cover emergency treatment. The children in the R case were entitled to remain, to carry on their education, because there would otherwise be an obstacle to free movement. Furthermore, the mother had a right to remain, because Regulation 492/11, read in the light of ECHR art 8, 'necessarily implies' that the children are accompanied by their primary carer, even if the carer does not have independent rights under EU law. (Now Citizens' Rights Directive Article 12(3).)

82 Under Article 17(1) EC, every person holding the nationality of a Member State is to be a citizen of the Union. Union citizenship is destined to be the fundamental status of nationals of the Member States (see, to that effect, Case C-184/99 Grzelczyk [2001] ECR I-6193, paragraph 31).

83 Moreover, the Treaty on European Union does not require that citizens of the Union pursue a professional or trade activity, whether as an employed or self-employed person, in order to enjoy the rights provided in Part Two of the EC Treaty, on citizenship of the Union. Furthermore, there is nothing in the text of that Treaty to permit the conclusion that citizens of the Union who have established themselves in another Member State in order to carry on an activity as an employed person there are deprived, where that activity comes to an end, of the rights which are conferred on them by the EC Treaty by virtue of that citizenship.

84 As regards, in particular, the right to reside within the territory of the Member States under Article 18(1) EC, that right is conferred directly on every citizen of the Union by a clear and precise provision of the EC Treaty. Purely as a national of a Member State, and consequently a citizen of the Union, Mr Baumbast therefore has the right to rely on Article 18(1) EC.

85 Admittedly, that right for citizens of the Union to reside within the territory of another Member State is conferred subject to the limitations and conditions laid down by the EC Treaty and by the measures adopted to give it effect.

86 However, the application of the limitations and conditions acknowledged in Article 18(1) EC in respect of the exercise of that right of residence is subject to judicial review. Consequently, any limitations and conditions imposed on that right do not prevent the provisions of Article 18(1) EC from conferring on individuals rights which are enforceable by them and which the national courts must protect (see, to that effect, Case 41/74 Van Duyn [1974] ECR 1337, paragraph 7).

87 As regards the limitations and conditions resulting from the provisions of secondary legislation, Article 1(1) of Directive 90/364 provides that Member States can require of the nationals of a Member State who wish to enjoy the right to reside within their territory that they themselves and the members of their families be covered by sickness insurance in respect of all risks in the host Member State and have sufficient resources to avoid becoming a burden on the social assistance system of the host Member State during their period of residence.

88 As to the application of those conditions for the purposes of the Baumbast case, it is clear from the file that Mr Baumbast pursues an activity as an employed person in non-member countries for German companies and that neither he nor his family has used the social assistance system in the host Member State. In those circumstances, it has not been denied that Mr Baumbast satisfies the condition relating to sufficient resources imposed by Directive 90/364.

89 As to the condition relating to sickness insurance, the file shows that both Mr Baumbast and the members of his family are covered by comprehensive sickness insurance in Germany. The Adjudicator seems to have found that that sickness insurance could not cover emergency treatment given in the United Kingdom. It is for the national tribunal to determine whether that finding is correct in the light of Regulation (EEC) No 1408/71 of the Council of 14 June 1971 on the application of social security schemes to employed persons and their families moving within the Community (OJ, English Special Edition 1971 (II), p. 416). Particular reference should be made to Article 19(1)(a) of that regulation which ensures, at the expense of the competent Member State, the right for an employed or self-employed person residing in the territory of another Member State other than the competent State whose condition requires treatment in the territory of the Member State of residence to receive sickness benefits in kind provided by the institution of the latter State.

90 in any event, the limitations and conditions which are referred to in Article 18 EC and laid down by Directive 90/364 are based on the idea that the exercise of the right of residence of citizens of the Union can be subordinated to the legitimate interests of the Member States. In that regard, according to the fourth recital in the preamble to Directive 90/364 beneficiaries of the right of residence must not become an unreasonable burden on the public finances of the host Member State.

91 However, those limitations and conditions must be applied in compliance with the limits imposed by Community law and in accordance with the general principles of that law, in particular the principle of proportionality. That means that national measures adopted on that subject must be necessary and appropriate to attain the objective pursued (see, to that effect, Joined Cases C-259/91, C-331/91 and C-332/91 Alluè and Others [1993] ECR I-4309, paragraph 15).

92 in respect of the application of the principle of proportionality to the facts of the Baumbast case, it must be recalled, first, that it has not been denied that Mr Baumbast has sufficient resources within the meaning of Directive 90/364; second, that he worked and therefore lawfully resided in the host Member State for several years, initially as an employed person and subsequently as a self-employed person; third, that during that period his family also resided in the host Member State and remained there even after his activities as an employed and self-employed person in that State came to an end; fourth, that neither Mr Baumbast nor the members of his family have become burdens on the public finances of the host Member State and, fifth, that both Mr Baumbast and his family have comprehensive sickness insurance in another Member State of the Union.

93 Under those circumstances, to refuse to allow Mr Baumbast to exercise the right of residence which is conferred on him by Article 18(1) EC by virtue of the application of the provisions of Directive 90/364 on the ground that his sickness insurance does not cover the emergency treatment given in the host Member State would amount to a disproportionate interference with the exercise of that right.

94 The answer to the first part of the third question must therefore be that a citizen of the European Union who no longer enjoys a right of residence as a migrant worker in the host Member State can, as a citizen of the Union, enjoy there a right of residence by direct application of Article 18(1) EC. The exercise of that right is subject to the limitations and conditions referred to in that provision, but the competent authorities and, where necessary, the national courts must ensure that those limitations and conditions are applied in compliance with the general principles of Community law and, in particular, the principle of proportionality.

== See also ==
- European Union law
