= Europe for Citizens =

EU programme to bring European citizens together

Europe for Citizens (formerly Citizens for Europe) is a European Union programme designed to help bridge the gap between citizens and the European Union. Ending in 2006, the European Commission on 6 April 2005 adopted a proposal for a programme to run from 2007 to 2013. In 2014 another programme started that will continue until 2017. The programme will provide the Union with instruments to promote active European citizenship, put citizens in the centre and offers them the opportunity to fully assume their responsibility as European citizens. The commission has determined that citizens should also be aware of their duties as citizen and become actively involved in the process of European integration, developing a sense of belonging and a European identity.

The global aim of the proposed programme is to contribute to:

- Giving citizens the opportunity to interact and participate in constructing an ever-closer Europe, united in and enriched through its cultural diversity;
- Forging a European identity, based on recognised common values, history and culture;
- Enhancing mutual understanding between European citizens respecting and celebrating cultural diversity, while contributing to intercultural dialogue.

The proposal affirms that Union citizenship should be the fundamental status of nationals of the Member States.

The budget for the new program is €235 million.

== See also ==
- Citizenship of the European Union
- European citizens' consultations
