= T. H. Marshall =

English sociologist (1893–1981)

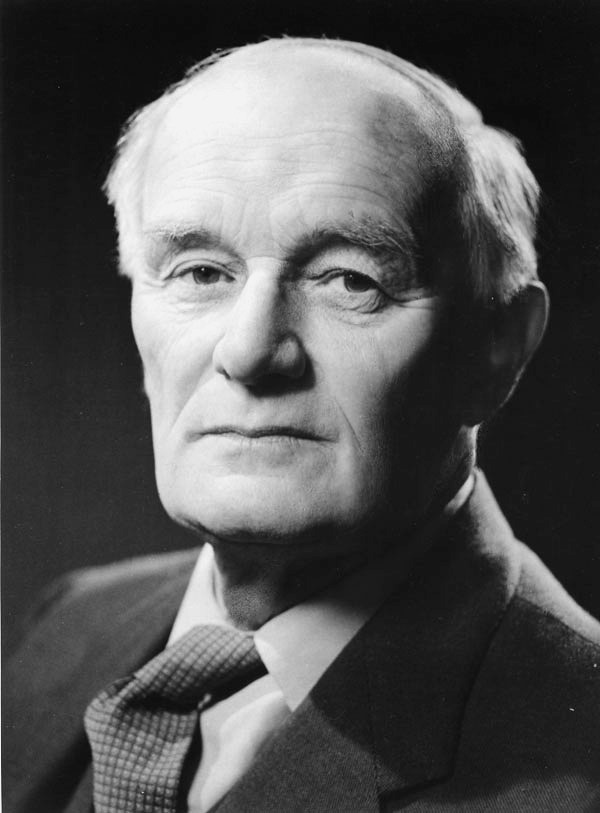
- Marshall c. 1950
- Born: Thomas Humphrey Marshall; 19 December 1893; London, England
- Died: 29 November 1981 (aged 87); Cambridge, England
- Political party: Labour

Academic background
- Education: Trinity College, Cambridge
- Influences: Lujo Brentano; L. T. Hobhouse

Academic work
- Discipline: Sociology
- Sub-discipline: Political sociology; social stratification
- School or tradition: Social democracy; social liberalism
- Institutions: Trinity College, Cambridge; London School of Economics
- Notable works: "Citizenship and Social Class" (1950)
- Notable ideas: Social citizenship
- Influenced: David Lockwood

Thomas Humphrey Marshall (19 December 1893 – 29 November 1981) was an English sociologist who is best known for his essay "Citizenship and Social Class," a key work on citizenship that introduced the idea that full citizenship includes civil, political, and social citizenship.

== Biography ==
T. H. Marshall was born in London on 19 December 1893 to a wealthy, artistically cultured family (a Bloomsbury family). He was the fourth of six children. His great-grandfather acquired an industrial fortune and his father, William Cecil Marshall, was a successful architect, giving Marshall a privileged upbringing and inheritance. He attended Rugby School, a public boarding school and then read history at Trinity College, Cambridge.

Marshall was a civilian prisoner in Germany during the First World War. In October 1919 he gained a fellowship at Trinity College, becoming a professional historian. This was interrupted when he became the Labour candidate for Farnham in the 1922 election. Despite being unsuccessful, Marshall found the experience beneficial because it brought him into close contact with working-class people and exposed him to the injustices and prejudices within the British class system. In "A British Sociological Career," he recounts that he "knew nothing of working-class life" growing up, suggesting this experience was transformative for his later work.

Marshall became a tutor in social work at the London School of Economics in 1925. He was promoted to reader and went on to become the head of the Social Science Department at LSE from 1944 to 1949 and Martin White Professorship of Sociology from 1954 to 1956.

Marshall worked for UNESCO as the head of the Social Science Department from 1956 to 1960, possibly contributing to the United Nations International Covenant on Economic, Social and Cultural Rights, which was drafted in 1954, but not ratified until 1966.

He was the fourth president of the International Sociological Association (1959–1962).

His papers are held in the Archives of the London School of Economics, along with an oral history interview he gave to the historian, Brian Harrison, in July 1978 about his niece, the suffragist Catherine Marshall.

Marshall died on 29 November 1981 in Cambridge.

== Academic research ==
=== Citizenship and Social Class ===
T.H. Marshall wrote an essay on citizenship – which became his most famous work – titled "Citizenship and Social Class." This was published in 1950 and was based on a lecture given the previous year. British citizenship was originally bestowed upon those of a higher status group with their own civil, political, and social privileges. Yet Marshall argued that, with the expansion of capitalism, a "new kind of citizenship slowly pulled apart the package of privileges hitherto enjoyed exclusively by the well-born." He analysed the development of citizenship as a development of civil, then political, then social rights.

Marshall defined the three aspects of citizenship as follows:

- Civil rights are "the rights necessary for individual freedom-liberty of the person, freedom of speech, thought and faith, the right to own property and to conclude valid contracts, and the right to justice."
  - This concept of individual civil rights "also undid statutes and customs that constricted the 'right to work.'" Working people could now legally pursue employment, which corresponds with the need of capitalism for labor markets.
  - Marshall also argued that "the principle of civil citizenship contains within itself...a 'drive' toward further equality - political equality."
- Political rights refer to "the right to participate in the exercise of political power."
  - Universal Suffrage
  - Electing representatives to Parliament
- Social rights include as "the right to a modicum of economic welfare and security to the right to share to the fuIl in the social heritage and to live the life of a civilised being." Social rights are usually understood as benefits associated with the modern welfare state and positive freedoms such as welfare rights.

Marshall also argued that these three aspects of citizenship developed in England in a certain order. Civil rights are broadly assigned with the eighteenth century, political to the nineteenth, and social to the twentieth century. There is a complex interplay between these conceptions of citizenship. According to Marshall, "once citizens are recognized as full members of society, they also receive undeniable social rights, such as protection against poverty."

This expansion of social rights "replaced earlier ideas of providing material assistance only as a matter of charity or, as under earlier social welfare legislation, of making state assistance conditional on recipients forfeiting their civil or political rights."

Social rights are awarded not on the basis of class or need, but rather on the status of citizenship. Marshall claimed that the extension of social rights does not entail the destruction of social classes and inequality. T.H. Marshall was a close friend and admirer of Leonard Hobhouse, and his conception of citizenship emerged from a series of lectures given by Hobhouse at the LSE. Hobhouse is more philosophical, whereas Marshall is under the influence of measures taken by Lord Beveridge after the Second World War. All of these people were involved in a turn in liberal thought that was called "new liberalism," a liberalism with a social conscience. T.H. Marshall also talks about industrial citizenship and its relationship with citizenship. He said that social rights are a precursor for political and civil rights.

Among the lasting influences of "Citizenship and Social Class" is its commentary on capitalism in relation to emerging social rights. Marshall noted the "contradiction between social rights and the requirements of a market economy within the dynamic context of welfare-capitalism...where citizenship functioned to contain these conflicts between social classes." Class inequality within capitalist societies created tension with Marshall's emerging ideas of citizenship. He argues that the creation of social rights are necessary in reducing this tension between civil, political, economic inequality. Marshall saw this process as a struggle unfolding over many centuries and looked to the future in hopes of a more egalitarian society.

==== Influence ====
Marshall's work on citizenship influenced other scholars. Reinhard Bendix's Nation Building and Citizenship (1964) is said to owe "much to Marshall and much of it reads like a commentary on Marshall's own treatment of that theme."

Talcott Parsons's "Full Citizenship for the Negro American?" (1965) drew "enormously from Marshall."

Stein Rokkan met Marshall at the London School of Economics and Rokkan's work on citizenship was influenced by Marshall's ideas.

Anthony Giddens's discussion of citizenship in The Nation-State and Violence (1985) builds on Marshall's distinctions and analysis.

Marshall, along with Stein Rokkan, is credited with the establishment of "what has become the standard narrative of the evolution of modern democratic citizenship."

Marshall's emphasis on social rights influenced both theoretical literature and policies pursued in the twentieth century.

==== Criticisms ====
Marshall's analysis of citizenship has been criticised on the basis that it only applies to males in England (note: England rather than Britain). His theories specifically applied within English contexts of social reform and therefore were not subject to comparative analysis. Marxist critics point out that Marshall's analysis is superficial as it does not discuss the right of the citizen to control economic production, which they argue is necessary for sustained shared prosperity. From a feminist perspective, the work of Marshall is highly constricted in being focused on men and ignoring the social rights of women and impediments to their realisation.

There is a debate among scholars about whether Marshall intended his historical analysis to be interpreted as a general theory of citizenship or whether the essay was just a commentary on developments within England. The essay has been used by editors to promote more equality in society, including the "Black" vote in the US, and against Mrs. Thatcher in a 1992 edition prefaced by Tom Bottomore. It is an Anglo-Saxon interpretation of the evolution of rights in a "peaceful reform" mode, unlike the revolutionary interpretations of Charles Tilly, the other great theoretician of citizenship in the twentieth century, who bases his readings in the developments of the French Revolution.

Although Marshall was specifically concerned about the class inequalities within capitalist societies and their impact on citizenship, William Wilson and Janet Finch note his neglect of issues pertaining to race and gender relations.

Michael Mann criticized Marshall's theory of citizenship "for being Anglocentric and evolutionist."

Jørgen Møller and Svend-Erik Skaaning argue that Marshall's claim that citizenship rights are extended in a certain order – civil, political, and then social citizenship rights – "is no longer the prevalent one in the developing and transformation countries of the contemporary era."

Other scholars find Marshall's "story of inexorable upward progress" as assuming that all victories for social rights were an "irreversible achievement" rather than the result of "bitter struggles involved in winning basic rights for all."

Marshall's ideas of social citizenship influenced institutions of health and education in addition to setting new rules for minimum wage, hours of labor, working conditions, as well as safety in the workplace and compensation in the event of an accident. However, since capitalism rests on the exploitation and inequality of laborers, the development of social rights challenged this economic system. The state responded to these "opposing interests by granting some rights to the working class" while still preventing them from obtaining greater influence to overthrow the system. Despite designating social rights to the worker and igniting a questioning of "the righteousness of democracy," Marshall's theory of social citizenship "carries on the capitalist expansionism with the veil of equality."

=== Sociology at a Crossroads and Other Essays ===
In 1963, Marshall published another work, Sociology at a Crossroads and Other Essays, which includes a collection of sixteen essays modeled on the work of Max Weber. He structured the essays under three main titles: "Sociology of Today and Tomorrow", "Social Class", and "Social Welfare".

The first several essays focus on the problems facing Sociology in the present day. Marshall sees the discipline as being at a crossroads where several paths meet. The first leads to "universal laws and ultimate values," whereas the second "leads to a collection of a multitude of facts." Finally, the third is one that Marshall recommends as the ideal direction for Sociology. This path "'leads into a country where sociology can choose units of study of manageable size – not society, progress, morals and civilization – but specific social structures in which the basic processes and functions have determined meanings.'" After indicating this path for Sociology, Marshall goes on to define the discipline as the "analytical and explanatory study of social systems" on a larger-scale, such as nations or states and also smaller systems that function within those societies.

Marshall also elaborates on concepts of "class," "social class," "status," "social status," "prestige," "position," and "role," all of which develop his analysis of social stratification. In writing about social conflict, he encourages reserving the term "conflict" for "'cases in which the common interest shared by the rivals dwindles to vanishing point' and 'little regard is paid even to the accepted rules of warfare.'"

The final essays are dedicated to analyzing the concepts and problems of the Welfare State and Affluent Society in England, France, and Germany.

==== Influence ====
Marshall's analysis developed a deeper understanding of social phenomena and identified the "time and space limitations of concepts," namely what he refers to as the first and second paths in the crossroads of sociology.

==== Criticisms ====
There is some disagreement regarding Marshall's very broad definition of "social systems," as some find that it covers too many different entities and therefore blurs "the distinction between society and state, and between the whole and the part."

== Philosophy of social science ==
Modern political science pioneer Seymour Martin Lipset argues that Marshall proposed a model of social science based on the middle-range theory of social structures and institutions, as opposed to grand theories of the purposes of development and modernisation, which were criticised by modern sociologists such as Robert K. Merton for being too speculative to provide valid results. By using such a middle-range approach, Marshall and his mentor L. T. Hobhouse believed that rigid class distinctions could be dissolved and middle-class citizenship generalised through a careful understanding of social mechanisms. He also believed this would allow sociology to become an international discipline, helping "to increase mutual understanding between cultures" and further international co-operation. While employing some concepts from Marxist conflict theory, such as social class and revolution, Marshall's analyses are based on functionalist concerns with phenomena such as "consensus, the normal, and anomie; co-operation and conflict; structure and growth," within self-contained systems. Rather than studying "society," which may include non-systemic elements, Marshall argues that the task of sociology is:

the analytical and explanatory study of social systems....a set of interrelated and reciprocal activities having the following characteristics. The activities are repetitive and predictable to the degree necessary, first, to permit of purposeful, peaceful and orderly behaviour of the members of the society, and secondly to enable the pattern of action to continue in being, that is to say to preserve its identity even while gradually changing its shape.

Since his work centers around functionalism, Marshall "uses a top-down perspective, by describing how political systems allocate social and political rights to citizens and develop institutions that are in charge of administering these rights."

Whereas Marxists point to the internal contradictions of capital accumulation and class inequality (intra-systemic), Marshall sees phenomena that are anti-systemic as partly "alien" to the social system. Anti-system refers to one of the three branches of social phenomena that Marshall defines in Sociology at a Crossroads and Other Essays. It posits that conflict is incompatible with the operation of a social system yet is simultaneously an inevitable part of that system. The other two branches are known as "non-system" and "pro-system."

== See also ==
- Citizenship – Legal membership in a country
- T.H. Marshall's Social Citizenship – Political concept
- Social citizenship
- Welfare state – Form of government
- Reinhard Bendix – German-American sociologist (1916–1991)
- Stein Rokkan – Norwegian sociologist (1921–1979)
- The Rhetoric of Reaction – 1991 book by Albert O. Hirschman

== Further reading (by Marshall) ==
- Marshall, T.H. (ed.). 1938. Class Conflict and Social Stratification. London: Le Play House Press.
- Marshall, T.H. 1950. Citizenship and Social Class: And Other Essays. Cambridge, Eng.: Cambridge University Press.
- Marshall, T.H. 1963. Sociology at the Crossroads and Other Essays. London: Heinemann.
- Marshall, T.H. 1973. "A British Sociological Career". International Social Science Journal 25(1/2): 88–100.
- Marshall, T.H. 1981. The Right to Welfare and Other Essays. London: Heinemann.

== Further reading (on Marshall) ==
- Bulmer, Martin, and Anthony Rees (eds). 1996. Citizenship Today: The Contemporary Relevance of T.H. Marshall. London: Routledge.
- Crowley, John. 1998. "The National Dimension of Citizenship in T.H. Marshall". Citizenship Studies 2:2: 165–178.
- Halsey, A. H. 1984. "T.H. Marshall, past and present: 1893–1981". Sociology 18: 1–18.
- Giddens, Anthony. 1982. Profiles and Critiques of Social Theory. Berkeley: University of California Press, Ch. 12, "Class Division, Class Conflict and Citizenship Rights."
- Mead, Lawrence M. 1997. "Citizenship and Social Policy: T.H. Marshall and Poverty". Social Philosophy and Policy 14(2): 197–230.
- Møller, Jørgen, and Svend-Erik Skaaning. 2010. "Marshall Revisited: The Sequence of Citizenship Rights in the Twenty-first Century." Government and Opposition Vol. 45, No. 4: 457–483.
- Rees, Anthony. 1995. "The Other T.H. Marshall". Journal of Social Policy 24(3): 341–362.
- Revi, Ben. 2014. "T.H. Marshall and his Critics: Reappraising 'social citizenship' in the Twenty-first Century". Citizenship Studies 18:3-4: 452–464.

Professional and academic associations
Preceded by Georges Friedmann	President of the International Sociological Association; 1959–1962	Succeeded by René König
Preceded by Baroness Wootton of Abinger	President of the British Sociological Association; 1964–1969	Succeeded by Thomas Bottomore
