= T.H. Marshall's Social Citizenship =

Political concept

T. H. Marshall's social citizenship is a political concept first highlighted in his essay, “Citizenship and the Social Class” in 1949.

== Overview ==
Marshall's concept defines the social responsibilities the state has to its citizens or, as Marshall puts it, “from [granting] the right to a modicum of economic welfare and security to the right to share to the full in the social heritage and to live the life of a civilized being according to the standards prevailing in the society”. One of the key points made by Marshall is his belief in an evolution of rights in England acquired via citizenship, from “civil rights in the eighteenth [century], political in the nineteenth, and social in the twentieth”. This evolution however, has been criticized by many for only being from the perspective of the white working man. Marshall concludes his essay with three major factors for the evolution of social rights and for their further evolution, listed below:

1. The lessening of the income gap
2. “The great extension of the area of common culture and common experience”
3. An enlargement of citizenship and more rights granted to these citizens.

Many of the social responsibilities of a state have since become a major part of many state’s policies (see United States Social Security). However, these have also become controversial issues as there is a debate over whether a citizen truly has the right to education and even more so, to social welfare.

== Criticism ==
=== From neo-liberals ===
“Neo-Liberal (Free-Market) ideology [asserts] that state abstention from economic protection is the foundation of a good society”, thus they are diametrically opposed to the social rights proposed by Marshall. Neo-liberals instead suggest that welfare programs (some of the social responsibilities discussed by Marshall to help the poor “effectively utilize their civil and political rights”), have “promoted passivity among the poor, without actually improving their chances, and created a culture of dependency”. They instead suggest (and have implemented) welfare requiring fulfillment of obligations.

Proponents of social citizenship are very critical of the Neo-Liberal ideology, suggesting that it is an “assault on the very principle of citizenship”, and that the Neo-Liberal institution of fulfillment of obligations as requirement for citizenship, because they suggest that citizenship is inherent and that “that is only appropriate to demand fulfillment of the responsibilities after the right to participate is achieved”.

== Conclusion ==
T.H. Marshall published his essay in 1949 and it has had a huge impact on many of the citizenship debates which have followed it. Though the original essay fails to view perspectives other than that of a working class white male, social citizenship not only can be, but has been, applied to myriad peoples.
