= Social citizenship =

Social citizenship was a term coined by T. H. Marshall, who argued that the ideal citizenship experience entails access to political, civil and social rights in a state. According to Marshall, social citizenship includes “the whole range from the right to a modicum of economic welfare and security to the right to share to the full in the social heritage and to live the life of a civilized being according to the standards prevailing in society”. Marshall’s concept of social policy has been critiqued by some scholars for being idealistic and only applicable to the participation of able-bodied white males.

== History of social policy in Britain ==
Under the Elizabethan Poor Law, social rights were not part of citizenship status. The Poor Relief Act 1601 placed the responsibility of caring for disabled people on the family; the state was not legally obligated to care for those who were unable to work. By the middle of the seventeenth century, small pensions were allocated to the poor, which often included disabled persons who were barred from wage labor, although these provisions were meager and not substantial enough to live off of.

The Poor Law Amendment Act 1834 was created in order to reduce the number of able-bodied poor who received a pension. While disabled people were able to access monetary assistance, they could only receive indoor assistance through institutionalization. This structure of monetary provision stigmatized disabled people for their lack of participation in the labor force and ostracized them from the community, a result that reflects the cultural emphasis placed upon the ability and willingness to participate in the labor force.

Beginning in the early 1900s, a “residual approach” to social policy was enacted in Britain where financial assistance would be provided to those without support at a minimal level in order to encourage active participation in the labor force. Post-1945, additions were made to this social welfare approach that encompassed political-economic, social, and organizational reform. Political-economic motivation emphasized reform encouraging high rates of employment, lower taxes, and minimal welfare dependents. Social reform placed women, children, the elderly and disabled people as dependents of a male wage-earner which cast further distinctions between impaired and able-bodied citizens. Finally, organizational reforms gave professionals increasing state support and decision making power in the realm of social services, especially in the case of health services.

== Social citizenship and the disabled today ==
The current model of the welfare state, whereby social citizenship is obtained, encourages citizens to enter a “welfare market” in which they become consumers of welfare benefits, especially benefits linked to health and social care. Beginning in 1979, the conservative administration led by Margaret Thatcher encouraged this model, arguing that market based access to social citizenship allows for the empowerment of citizens. This capitalist model, advocates claim, allows citizens to obtain full social citizenship by becoming “competent members of society,” which according to citizenship theorists Turner and Marshall is a key aspect of being a member of the state. Whereas barred access to full social citizenship was combated by strengthening the private sector under Thatcher, the New Labour Government elected in 1997 focused on the expansion of public services in order to raise employment, and combat poverty. Under the New Labour government, social inclusion became one of the primary rights of social citizenship in Britain. Social inclusion is multifaceted and includes the right of a citizen to participate in society and the economy.

== Relevant legislation ==
The Disability Discrimination Act 1995 was the first social policy created to prevent exclusion and discrimination in matters of the economy, though the act did not address prevalent inequalities in education and transportation.

In 2001, the Special Educational Needs and Disability Act (SENDA) made discrimination against students in special education illegal and called for 'reasonable adjustments' to be made in order to ensure equal access to education, a crucial aspect of social citizenship.

The Disability Equality Duty (DED) created in 2005 called for institutions to begin planning changes to infrastructure in order to further include people with disabilities.

== Critiques of social rights ==
Disability rights movements in Europe have primarily been centered on making changes in social welfare policy. Organizations advocating for disability rights in Britain have argued for the elimination of stereotypes that cast people with disabilities as vulnerable and in need of community care. In the current system, health and service providers have been in control of assessing the needs of disabled people. Many disability rights organizations in Britain have pushed against this system in which the practitioner’s expertise takes precedence over the experience and assessment of the patient. Biehal and colleagues have stated, “Many users of social services are excluded from full citizenship. Their right to treatment as equals may be limited by poverty, racism, assumptions about gender, age and disability”.

Policies created to ensure the social participation of British citizens with disabilities have been critiqued for not being strict enough. The Disability Discrimination Act 1995 has been accused of providing only limited protection as it did not include protection from discrimination in education or transportation. In addition, 90% of employers were exempt from following the act due to the fact that they had fewer than 20 employees. The policies that were designed to answer these critiques have also been accused of being inadequate as they are difficult to enforce.
