= European Citizens' Consultations =

The European Citizens' Consultations were a series of public consultations with citizens from the 28 member states of the European Union about the future of Europe. Between October 2006 and May 2007, more than 1,800 citizens in 27 countries were consulted in 23 languages, selected at random by professional recruitment agencies or universities according to a set of criteria designed to ensure that the participants were representative of the EU population. In European- and national-level debates the citizens chose and discussed three topics they considered most important to their lives, identified common ground and made recommendations to policy-makers responsible for decisions on Europe's future.

The consultations were organised by a group of independent, not-for-profit organisations led by the King Baudouin Foundation in Belgium, in collaboration with European Citizen Action Service (ECAS), the European Policy Centre (EPC) and the Network of European Foundations for Innovative Cooperation (NEF). They were supported by Compagnia di San Paolo, Riksbankens Jubileumsfond, Robert Bosch Stiftung and Calouste Gulbenkian Foundation. The partners and donors of the project included organisations from all member states. The project was co-financed by the European Commission and linked to DG Communication's Plan D.

== Project phases ==
The consultations were divided into three main phases: the agenda setting event in October 2006; the national consultations from February until March 2007; and the Synthesis Event in May 2007. The last event launched a follow-up process consisting of numerous discussion and information events at national level.

In October 2006, 200 randomly selected citizens from all EU member states were invited to submit their opinions on the influence Europe had had on their lives, and what direction they would like to see Europe take in the future. In a two-day event, the participants shared their perspectives and experiences with each other, assisted by table facilitators and interpreters. Three prioritised topics were chosen from a list by electronic vote:

- Energy & Environment: The environmental and economic impact of Europe's energy use
- Family & Social Welfare: The social and economic conditions for Europe's families
- EU's Global Role & Immigration: The EU's role in the world and the management of immigration

During February and March 2007, these three prioritised topics were debated at 27 national consultations, each attended by between 30 and 200 randomly selected citizens of the respective country. Between five and ten of these events took place simultaneously, following the same schedule and exchanging live impressions and results. After six weekends of consultations, a map of European public opinion on the three topics emerged.

In a final step, on 9 and 10 May 2007, 27 citizen representatives took part in a European-level synthesis exercise focusing on the common ground and the areas of divergence between the national findings. On the basis of the 27 national reports, they produced a report, "European Citizens' Perspectives on the Future of Europe", which was presented at a press conference in the European Parliament to policy-makers, including Commission Vice-President Margot Wallström, who discussed with them the implications of their results in a subsequent European Citizens' Roundtable.

Follow-up events took place from May 2007. A policy debate at the European Policy Centre (EPC) officially launched the follow-up process at European level. A discussion about citizen participation took place at the ECAS headquarters in autumn 2007. Follow-up activities at the national level included 39 local debates in Belgium, 15 local citizen forums in Germany, debating cafés in Slovenia, a school competition in Ireland, and press conferences with EU Commissioners in Slovakia and the Czech Republic.

At the European policy event three of the participating attended on behalf of the over 1,800 who took part in the process, and presented the key recommendations made in each of the three central policy areas discussed.

In November 2018 the European Policy Centre published "The European Citizens' Consultations - Evaluation report".
