= J. W. Harris =

J. W. Harris may refer to the following:

- James Harrison (Australian governor) (1912–1971), Australian politician
- James Harris (solicitor) (1940–2004), British legal scholar
- J.W. Harris (bull rider) (born 1986), American bull riding world champion
