= Jon Lawrence =

British historian

Jon Lawrence FRHistS
- Born: Jonathan Mark Lawrence; 1961 (age 64–65); Bristol, England, UK
- Occupation: Historian
- Partner: Jane Elliott

Academic background
- Education: King's College
- Thesis: Party Politics and the People: Continuity and Change in the Political History of Wolverhampton, 1815–1914 (1989)
- Doctoral advisor: Gareth Stedman Jones
- Influences: Richard Hoggart and Raymond Williams

Academic work
- Discipline: History
- Sub-discipline: Popular culture, class politics and everyday life
- Institutions: University of Liverpool; Harvard University; University of Cambridge
- Website: edgeofthemoor.org

Jonathan Mark Lawrence, FRHistS (born 1961) is a British historian. He is Emeritus Professor of Modern British History at the University of Exeter.

== Early life and education ==
Born in Bristol in 1961, he attended King's College, Cambridge; after graduating with a Bachelor of Arts degree in 1983, he completed doctoral studies. In 1989, he was awarded a Doctor of Philosophy degree for his thesis "Party Politics and the People: Continuity and Change in the Political History of Wolverhampton, 1815–1914", which was supervised by Gareth Stedman Jones.

== Career ==
Lawrence subsequently taught at University College London and the University of Liverpool before he was appointed a university lecturer in modern British history at the University of Cambridge and a fellow of Emmanuel College, Cambridge, in 2004. He was promoted to a senior lectureship in 2006 and to a readership in 2011. In 2017, he moved to the University of Exeter to be an associate professor; he was promoted to be Professor of Modern British History in 2019. He retired to become emeritus in 2024.

As of 2021, he is a fellow of the Royal Historical Society. In 2017, he gave the annual Neale Lecture at University College London on the topic "The Culture Wars of Class in Post-War Britain".

== Bibliography ==
Books

- Lawrence, Jon; Taylor, Miles, eds. (1997). Party, State and Society: Electoral Behaviour in Britain since 1820. Aldershot: Scolar Press. ISBN 9781859280461.
- Lawrence, Jon (1998). Speaking for the People: Party, Language and Popular Politics in England, 1867–1914. Cambridge: Cambridge University Press. ISBN 9780511585661.
- Lawrence, Jon; Starkey, Pat, eds. (2001). Child Welfare and Social Action in the Nineteenth and Twentieth Centuries: International Perspectives. Liverpool: Liverpool University Press. doi:10.5949/UPO9781846312816. ISBN 9780853236863.
- Lawrence, Jon (2009). Electing Our Masters: The Hustings in British Politics from Hogarth to Blair. Oxford: Oxford University Press. ISBN 9780199550128.
- Feldman, David; Lawrence, Jon, eds. (2014). Structures and Transformations in Modern British History. Cambridge: Cambridge University Press. doi:10.1017/CBO9780511973901. ISBN 9781107679641.
- Lawrence, Jon (2019). Me, Me, Me?: Individualism and the Struggle for Community in Post-War England. Oxford: Oxford University Press. ISBN 9780198779537.

Thesis

- Lawrence, Jonathan (1989). Party Politics and the People: Continuity and Change in the Political History of Wolverhampton, 1815–1914 (PhD). University of Cambridge.

Peer-reviewed articles and chapters

- Lawrence, Jon (1991). "Popular Politics and the Limitations of Party: Wolverhampton, 1867–1900". In Biagini, Eugenio F.; Reid, Alastair J. (eds.). Currents of Radicalism: Popular Radicalism, Organized Labour and Party Politics in Britain, 1850–1914. Cambridge University Press. pp. 65–85. doi:10.1017/CBO9780511522482.005. ISBN 9780511522482.
- Lawrence, Jon; Dean, Martin; Robert, Jean-Louis (1992). "The Outbreak of War and the Urban Economy: Paris, Berlin and London in 1914". Economic History Review. 45 (3): 564–593. doi:10.1111/j.1468-0289.1992.tb02152.x. JSTOR 2598053.
- Lawrence, Jon (1992). "Popular Radicalism and the Socialist Revival in Britain". Journal of British Studies. 31 (2): 163–186. doi:10.1086/386002. JSTOR 175764. S2CID 144220482.
- Lawrence, Jon; Taylor, Miles (1993). "The Poverty of Protest: Gareth Stedman Jones and the Politics of Language – A Reply". Social History. 18 (1): 1–15. doi:10.1080/03071029308567857. JSTOR 4286076.
- Winter, Jay; Lawrence, Jon; Arouiat, Jackie (1993). "The Impact of War on Infant Mortality in London". Annales de Démographie Historique: 329–353. doi:10.3406/adh.1993.1846. JSTOR 44385627. PMID 11623381.
- Lawrence, Jon (1993). "Class and Gender in the Making of Urban Toryism, 1880–1914". The English Historical Review. 108 (428): 629–652. doi:10.1093/ehr/CVIII.428.629. JSTOR 574750.
- Lawrence, Jon (1994). "The First World War and Its Aftermath". In Johnson, Paul (ed.). Twentieth-Century Britain: Economic, Social and Cultural Change. London: Longman. pp. 151–168. ISBN 9780582228177.
- Lawrence, Jon (1997). "The Transition to War in 1914". In Winter, Jay; Robert, Jean-Louis (eds.). Capital Cities at War: London, Paris, Berlin, 1914–1919. Cambridge: Cambridge University Press. pp. 135–163. doi:10.1017/CBO9780511599613.006. ISBN 9780521668149.
- Lawrence, Jon (1997). "Material Pressures on the Middle Classes". In Winter, Jay; Robert, Jean-Louis (eds.). Capital Cities at War: London, Paris, Berlin, 1914–1919. Cambridge: Cambridge University Press. pp. 229–254. doi:10.1017/CBO9780511599613.009. ISBN 9780521668149.
- Lawrence, Jon; Taylor, Miles (1997). "Electoral Sociology and the Historians". In Lawrence, Jon; Taylor, Miles (eds.). Party, State and Society: Electoral Behaviour in Britain since 1820. Abingdon: Scolar Press. pp. 1–26. ISBN 9781859280461.
- Lawrence, Jon (1997). "The Dynamics of Urban Politics, 1867–1914". In Lawrence, Jon; Taylor, Miles (eds.). Party, State and Society: Electoral Behaviour in Britain since 1820. Abingdon: Scolar Press. pp. 79–105. ISBN 9781859280461.
- Lawrence, Jon (1999). "The Complexities of English Progressivism: Wolverhampton Politics in the Early Twentieth Century". Midland History. 24 (1): 147–166. doi:10.1179/mdh.1999.24.1.147.
- Lawrence, Jon (2000). "Labour – The Myths It Has Lived By". In Tanner, Duncan; Thane, Pat; Tiratsoo, Nick (eds.). Labour's First Century. Cambridge: Cambridge University Press. pp. 341–366. ISBN 9780521037990.
- Lawrence, Jon (2001). "Contesting the Male Polity: The Suffragettes and the Politics of Disruption in Edwardian Britain". In Vickery, Amanda (ed.). Women, Privilege and Power: British Politics, 1750 to the Present. Stanford, Calif.: Stanford University Press. pp. 201–226. ISBN 9780804742849.
- Lawrence, Jon; Starkey, Pat (2001). "Child Welfare and Social Action". In Lawrence, Jon; Starkey, Pat (eds.). Child Welfare and Social Action in the Nineteenth and Twentieth Centuries: International Perspectives. Liverpool: Liverpool University Press. pp. 1–11. ISBN 9780853236863.
- Lawrence, Jon (2003). "Forging a Peaceable Kingdom: War, Violence and the Fear of Brutalisation in Post-First World War Britain". Journal of Modern History. 75 (3): 557–589. doi:10.1086/380238. JSTOR 380238. S2CID 152394527.
- Lawrence, Jon (2003). "Political History". In Berger, Stefan; Feldner, Heiko; Passmore, Kevin (eds.). Writing History: Theory and Practice. London: Hodder Arnold. pp. 183–202. ISBN 9780340761762.
- Lawrence, Jon (2003). "Fascist Violence and the Politics of Public Order in Inter-War Britain: The Olympia Debate Revisited". Historical Research. 76 (192): 238–267. doi:10.1111/1468-2281.00174.
- Lawrence, Jon (2005). "'Why Olympia Mattered'". Historical Research. 78 (200): 263–272. doi:10.1111/j.1468-2281.2005.00341.x.
- Lawrence, Jon (2006). "The Transformation of British Public Politics after the First World War". Past and Present. 190 (1): 185–216. doi:10.1093/pastj/gtj002. JSTOR 3600891.
- Lawrence, Jon (2007). "Public Space, Political Space". In Winter, Jay; Robert, Jean-Louis (eds.). Capital Cities at War: Paris, London, Berlin, 1914–1919. Studies in the Social and Cultural History of Modern Warfare. Vol. 2: A Cultural History. Cambridge: Cambridge University Press. pp. 280–312. ISBN 9781107406971.
- Lawrence, Jon; Elliott, Jane (2008). "Parliamentary Election Results Reconsidered: An Analysis of Borough Elections, 1885–1910". Parliamentary History. 16 (1): 18–28. doi:10.1111/j.1750-0206.1997.tb00571.x.
- Lawrence, Jon; Taylor, Miles (2008). "Les Historiens Britanniques Face à la Sociologie Politique". Politix. 81: 13–39. doi:10.3917/pox.081.0013.
- Lawrence, Jon (2010). "Political History". In Berger, Stefan; Feldner, Heiko; Passmore, Kevin (eds.). Writing History: Theory and Practice (2nd ed.). London: Hodder Arnold. pp. 213–231. ISBN 9780340975152.
- Lawrence, Jon (2011). "The Culture of Elections in Modern Britain". History. 96 (324): 459–476. doi:10.1111/j.1468-229X.2011.00529.x. JSTOR 24429247.
- Feldman, David; Lawrence, Jon (2011). "Structures and Transformations in British Historiography". In Feldman, David; Lawrence, Jon (eds.). Structures and Transformations in Modern British History. Cambridge: Cambridge University Press. pp. 1–23. doi:10.1017/CBO9780511973901.001. ISBN 9780521518826.
- Lawrence, Jon (2011). "Labour and the Politics of Class, 1900–1940". In Feldman, David; Lawrence, Jon (eds.). Structures and Transformations in Modern British History. Cambridge: Cambridge University Press. pp. 237–260. doi:10.1017/CBO9780511973901.011. ISBN 9780521518826.
- Lawrence, Jon (2011). "Paternalism, Class and the British Path to Modernity". In Gunn, Simon; Vernon, James (eds.). The Peculiarities of Liberal Modernity in Imperial Britain. Berkeley, Calif.: University of California Press. pp. 163–180. ISBN 9780520289536.
- Lawrence, Jon; Sutcliffe-Braithwaite, Florence (2012). "Margaret Thatcher and the Decline of Class Politics". In Jackson, Ben; Saunders, Robert (eds.). Making Thatcher's Britain. Cambridge University Press. pp. 132–147. doi:10.1017/CBO9780511998164.010. ISBN 9780511998164.
- Lawrence, Jon (2013). "Class, 'Affluence' and the Study of Everyday Life in Britain, c. 1930–1964". Cultural and Social History. 10 (2): 273–299. doi:10.2752/147800413X13591373275411. S2CID 145010972.
- Lawrence, Jon (2014). "Social-Science Encounters and the Negotiation of Difference in Early 1960s England". History Workshop Journal. 77: 215–239. doi:10.1093/hwj/dbt030. JSTOR i40131053.
- Lawrence, Jon (2015). "Public and Private Languages of 'Class' in the Luton By-Election of 1963". In Williams, Chris; Edwards, Andrew (eds.). The Art of the Possible: Politics and Governance in Modern British History, 1885–1997: Essays in Memory of Duncan Tanner. Manchester: Manchester University Press. pp. 188–206. doi:10.7228/manchester/9780719090714.001.0001. ISBN 9780719090714.
- Elliott, J.; Lawrence, Jon (2016). "The Emotional Economy of Unemployment: A Re-Analysis of Testimony from a Sheppey Family, 1978–1983". SAGE Open. 6 (4). doi:10.1177/2158244016669517. hdl:10871/31370.
- Lawrence, Jon (2016). "Inventing the 'Traditional Working Class': A Re-Analysis of Interview Notes from Young and Willmott's Family and Kinship in East London". The Historical Journal. 59 (2): 567–593. doi:10.1017/S0018246X15000515. S2CID 146894981.
- Lawrence, Jon (2017). "Workers' Testimony and the Sociological Reification of Manual/Non-Manual Distinctions in 1960s Britain". Sozial.Geschichte Online. 20: 13–51.
- Elliott, Jane; Lawrence, Jon (2017). "Narrative, Time and Intimacy in Social Research: Linda and Jim Revisited". In Crow, Graham; Ellis, Jaimie (eds.). Revisiting Divisions of Labour: The Impacts and Legacies of a Modern Sociological Classic. Manchester: Manchester University Press. pp. 189–204. doi:10.7765/9781526116239.00017. ISBN 9781526116239.
- Lawrence, Jon (2017). "Languages of Place and Belonging: Competing Conceptions of 'Community' in Mid-Twentieth-Century Bermondsey, London". In Couperus, Stefan; Kaal, Harm (eds.). (Re)Constructing Communities in Europe, 1918–1968: Senses of Belonging Below, Beyond and Within the Nation-State. London: Routledge. pp. 19–44. doi:10.4324/9781315532738. ISBN 9781315532738.
- Lawrence, Jon (2017). "Individualism and Community in Historical Perspective". In Cohen, Shana; Fuhr, Christina; Bock, Jan-Jonathan (eds.). Austerity, Community Action, and the Future of Citizenship in Europe. Bristol: Policy Press. pp. 239–254. doi:10.1332/policypress/9781447331032.001.0001. ISBN 9781447331032.
- Lawrence, Jon (2017). "The People's History and the Politics of Everyday Life since 1945". In Arnold, John H.; Hilton, Matthew; Rüger, Jan (eds.). History after Hobsbawm: Writing the Past for the Twenty-First Century. Oxford: Oxford University Press. pp. 272–291. doi:10.1093/oso/9780198768784.001.0001. ISBN 9780198768784.
- Lawrence, Jon (2020). "Labour and the Culture Wars of Modern Politics". The Political Quarterly. 91 (1): 31–34. doi:10.1111/1467-923X.12819. hdl:10871/40800. S2CID 213946215.
- Lawrence, Jon (2022). "On Historians' Re-Use of Social-Science Archives". Twentieth Century British History. 33 (3): 432–444. doi:10.1093/tcbh/hwac013.
- Beelen, Kaspar; Lawrence, Jon; Wilson, Daniel C. S.; Beavan, David (2022). "Bias and Representativeness in Digitized Newspaper Collections: Introducing the Environmental Scan". Digital Scholarship in the Humanities. 38: 1–22. doi:10.1093/llc/fqac037.
