= Robert Roberts (writer) =

English teacher and writer (1905–1974)

- Roberts as a young man
- Born: 15 June 1905; Salford, Lancashire, England
- Died: 17 September 1974 (aged 69); Gosport, Hampshire, England
- Occupations: Teacher; writer; social historian
- Works: Imprisoned Tongues (1968); The Classic Slum (1971); A Ragged Schooling (1976)
- Spouse: Ruth Dean (m. 1935)
- Children: 1

Robert Roberts (15 June 1905 – 17 September 1974) was an English teacher, writer and social historian, who penned evocative accounts of his working-class youth in The Classic Slum (1971) and A Ragged Schooling (1976).

Born and raised above his parents' corner shop in a deprived district of Salford, Roberts left school at 14 to undertake a seven-year apprenticeship as a brass finisher. Used as a form of cheap labour to carry out menial tasks, he was dismissed when the apprenticeship ended in 1926. Roberts inherited his mother's love of reading and socialist politics; while he spent the next three years unemployed, he attended evening classes to study foreign languages and social history.

In 1929, he was hired as a tutor/teacher at a commercial college. A staunch internationalist, he was dismissed from this job in 1940 when he was exempted as a conscientious objector from military service in the Second World War. After a short period teaching in Liverpool, he spent most of the 1940s and the 1950s working on a relative's farm in Yorkshire while teaching adult education classes and writing for the radio and newspapers. In 1957, he was hired as an education officer at Strangeways Prison in Manchester where he taught illiterate prisoners to read and write, experiences which formed the basis of his first book, Imprisoned Tongues (1968).

In 1971, Roberts followed this up with The Classic Slum, an account of his upbringing in Edwardian Salford which he intermixed with social and oral history. Roberts produced the book to counter what he felt were romantic conceptions of the working-class community in post-war sociological and social history studies; while emphasising the strength of many individual characters, his book highlighted the pervasive and often devastating effects of poverty, as well as the complex status distinctions and conservatism this produced among residents in his "slum". Widely praised on its release, this richly textured account has become a key source for understanding working-class experience in early-20th-century England. Two years later, Roberts moved to Hampshire where he died in 1974. His autobiography, A Ragged Schooling, was published posthumously; also praised, it was a more personal account of his childhood, teenage and early adult years.

== Life ==
=== Background ===
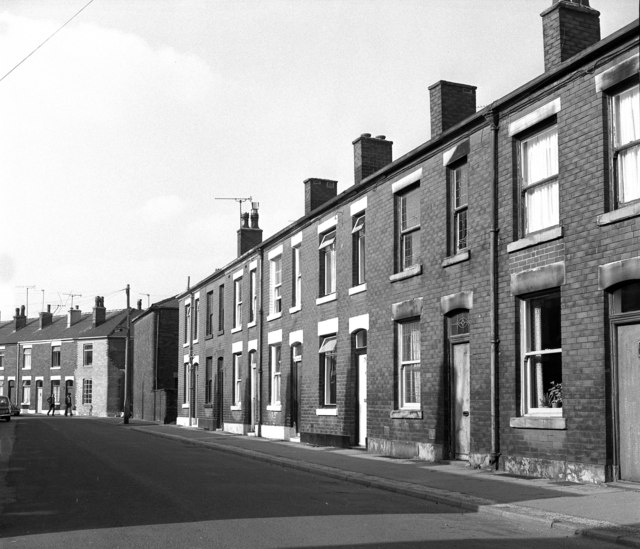
Workers' terraced housing in Rochdale, typical of the sort found in many of Lancashire's urban areas

Robert Roberts was born on 15 June 1905 at 1 Waterloo Street in Salford, Lancashire. His home town had played a key role in the early stages of the Industrial Revolution: with its neighbour Manchester, it had emerged in the late 18th and early 19th centuries at the centre of global textile manufacturing and the new factory system of production. This led to the conurbation's rapid expansion, but it also brought poverty as the often poorly paid workers were accommodated in small, densely crowded and unsanitary housing. Friedrich Engels was one of many social observers who commented on this; his description of Salford in The Condition of the Working Class in England (1845) highlighted the terrible state of the districts where the workers lived:

Whoever passes over this viaduct and looks down, sees filth and wretchedness enough; and, if any one takes the trouble to pass through these lanes, and glance through the open doors and windows into the houses and cellars, he can convince himself afresh with every step that the workers of Salford live in dwellings in which cleanliness and comfort are impossible.

Salford's economy had diversified by the time Roberts was born; cotton was still important, though engineering had become a key employer and other manufacturing industries had emerged. Nevertheless, poverty and poor housing remained endemic in working-class districts. Roberts's father, Robert (born c. 1872), was an engineer. His son described him as "firmly embedded in the working class", a "formidable figure in our neighbourhood ... a fair, handsome man, violent in drink and, when sober, eloquent after a loud-mouthed Celtic fashion". He married Jane Elizabeth "Jennie" Jones, and with her had seven children; the younger Robert was the fourth. Jennie had been a weaver before her marriage and unlike her husband had experienced a decent elementary education. Within a year of their marriage, the elder Robert had grown tired of travelling to Derbyshire to work for a firm of engineers. He was envious that his brothers-in-law were shopkeepers, and borrowed £40 from one of his sisters, who had all married well, to purchase a corner shop in a slum neighbourhood.

=== Early life (1905–1919) ===
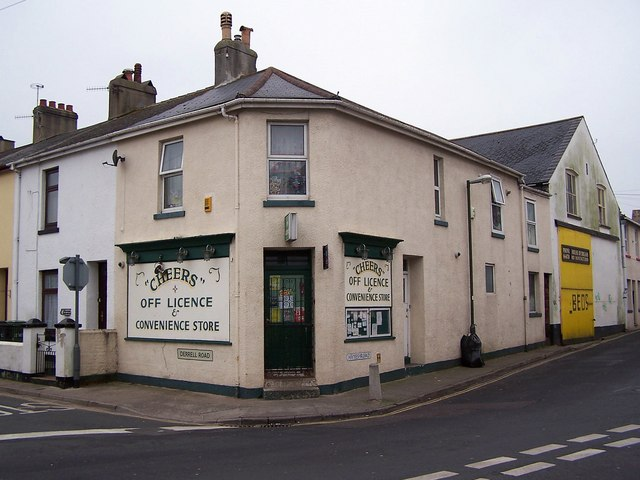
A corner shop, similar to the one run by Roberts's parents

Roberts and his siblings were born and raised at the family shop in Waterloo Street. Roberts would draw heavily on his experiences of growing up in this part of Salford when he compiled his autobiographical-historical books decades later. Living above and assisting in the shop allowed him to "eavesdrop on life", as he later wrote; all sorts of people from the community passed through which, along with his own parents' habits, gave him insights into the way people lived in his working-class district. Jennie ran the business, but the elder Robert's work as an engineer was punctuated by periods of unemployment; this combined with the shop's limited takings (in such a poor area) and his heavy drinking to keep the family tied to their neighbourhood for decades. The business nearly failed in 1911. Nevertheless, as their son later wrote, they were not "felt to be" fully part of the slum: Robert and Jennie's extended families included relatives with more money or social status than them; the elder Robert was a skilled worker, which brought higher status with it; and Jennie ranked highly in the community because of the status ascribed to her as a shopkeeper and because she could offer credit to other residents.

Roberts did not place his father in high esteem; in his later writings, he criticised the elder Robert's drunkenness and mocked his desire for social status (which Roberts saw as pretentious). He admired his mother Jennie. An avid reader, she inculcated in the younger Robert a lifelong passion for reading and a socialist worldview. (Note: He did recall sharing his father's frustration that Jennie (with no medical training) would call in on the local sick when they asked for her help, putting the Roberts family at risk. Roberts's father generally supported learning, but only when carried out alongside working full-time.) His formal education at Christ Church School ended at the age of 14. According to Roberts, he wanted to remain in education, but the school's curriculum did not cover the subjects needed to obtain a bursary to study at the local technical college. The headteacher would not offer extra tuition, so when Roberts sat the bursary examinations he failed and was told by his father to find work.

=== Apprenticeship and unemployment (1919–1929) ===
He then began a seven-year apprenticeship as a brass finisher. (Note: A brass finisher was a "general term for any worker employed on finishing brass castings or stampings, including brass turner, filer, burnisher, polisher, driller, solderer, fitter, etc.") During the 1920s and 1930s, apprentices in engineering were paid less than other workers. As such, employers frequently used them as a source of cheap labour, often with limited training. Roberts's apprenticeship consisted of his repeating mundane tasks for eight and a half hours every day:

Tich led me to a small contraption by a window, pulled a lever to put wheels in motion, tightened a union nut on a pedestal, and ran both, by ratchet, through a couple of whirring butterfly cutters. These flayed and polished two parallel sides of the nut. He then arced the pedestal through 120 degrees and again drove it through the cutters to shave two more flanks. "Now you do it!" ... Over the next two years, in between brushing the alleys and brewing thirty cans of tea each morning, I performed this simplest of tasks for eight and a half hours every working day. This was called an "engineering apprenticeship".

Roberts disliked the job intensely; even after he had been there long enough that new apprentices took over the sweeping (which dispersed metal dust into the air that irritated his lungs), he was required to stand in one place for hours on end to do his job. He recalled in his autobiography that he felt trapped: he yearned to read books, learn, enjoy music and visit Europe. During this time, he became involved in the labour movement. (Note: Roberts gives an account of joining the Amalgamated Engineering Union in his autobiography.) It was also common in the interwar period for wages to increase sharply on the completion of an apprenticeship, owing to pay structures and union contracts. This increase was often out of step with the limited productivity gained in the process (especially as the apprentice had often been used to carry out low-skilled, routine tasks); it was cheaper for an employer to lay off the apprentice on completion of his "training" and hire a new one to do the same job. Roberts was one of many young men who suffered this fate. After finishing his apprenticeship in 1926, he was summarily dismissed. The next three years were spent jobless. He attended evening classes to learn French and study social history and English literature, and in 1927 founded the Salford Esperanto Society.

=== Teaching, farm work, writing and later life (1929–1974) ===
In 1929, Roberts was employed as a French teacher by a local commercial college. (Note: The teacher Albert Heinig wrote that commercial education in England involved "develop[ing] the mental faculties of the pupil ... most needed in business life" and providing training for technical skills useful in business or office-based employment. Commercial colleges were established to provide this education.) According to his son, Roberts had been attending classes at the college and he obtained the position after he filled in for his teacher during a lesson and impressed the staff. He remained involved in the labour movement and became an internationalist, serving for a time as president of the Manchester Workers' International Club and opposing fascism in Europe (he paid visits to the continent to speak publicly on the topic). In 1935 he married Ruth Dean, (Note: She was born in 1911, the daughter of Albert Dean, a butcher.) with whom he had a son Glyn in 1937. Like Roberts, she was a keen Esperantist and a teacher.

Roberts objected to fighting in the Second World War on conscientious grounds; he was exempted from service in 1940, which led him to be sacked from his job. He then worked at the National Council of Labour Colleges in Liverpool (where he contracted tuberculosis) and then at his grandfather-in-law's farm in Yorkshire. He travelled to Sweden to work as a teacher in 1949, but his work was frustrated when his tuberculosis returned. After treatment, he came back to England. While continuing to work on the farm into the 1950s, Roberts was a part-time adult education tutor and wrote material for the radio (including the children's programme Crusoe Farm for the BBC) and the press.

Roberts was employed by Strangeways Prison in Manchester in 1957 as an education officer. His first book, Imprisoned Tongues, was printed in 1968 and described his work with illiterate prisoners. He also taught adult education classes outside of prison, sometimes with his wife. In 1971 his next book, The Classic Slum, was published, offering Roberts's account of his childhood which he intermixed with social history. Two years later, he and Ruth moved to live in Hampshire and in 1974 he was awarded an honorary master's degree by the University of Salford. He became ill with cancer and died, in Gosport, on 17 September 1974. His second autobiography, A Ragged Schooling, was published posthumously two years later. In 1985, the Manchester Studies Unit at Manchester Polytechnic held an exhibition called "The Classic Slum" at Cavendish House; inspired by Roberts's book, it contained a selection of the 60,000 photographs they had collected of Edwardian Salford. Ruth died in 2004. Their son Glyn worked in international development for non-governmental organisations, co-founded Tools for Self Reliance, and authored Questioning Development in 1974; a writer and traveller himself, he died in 2016. (Note: His other books included Sailing in a Sieve (1963).)

== Work ==
=== Imprisoned Tongues (1968) ===
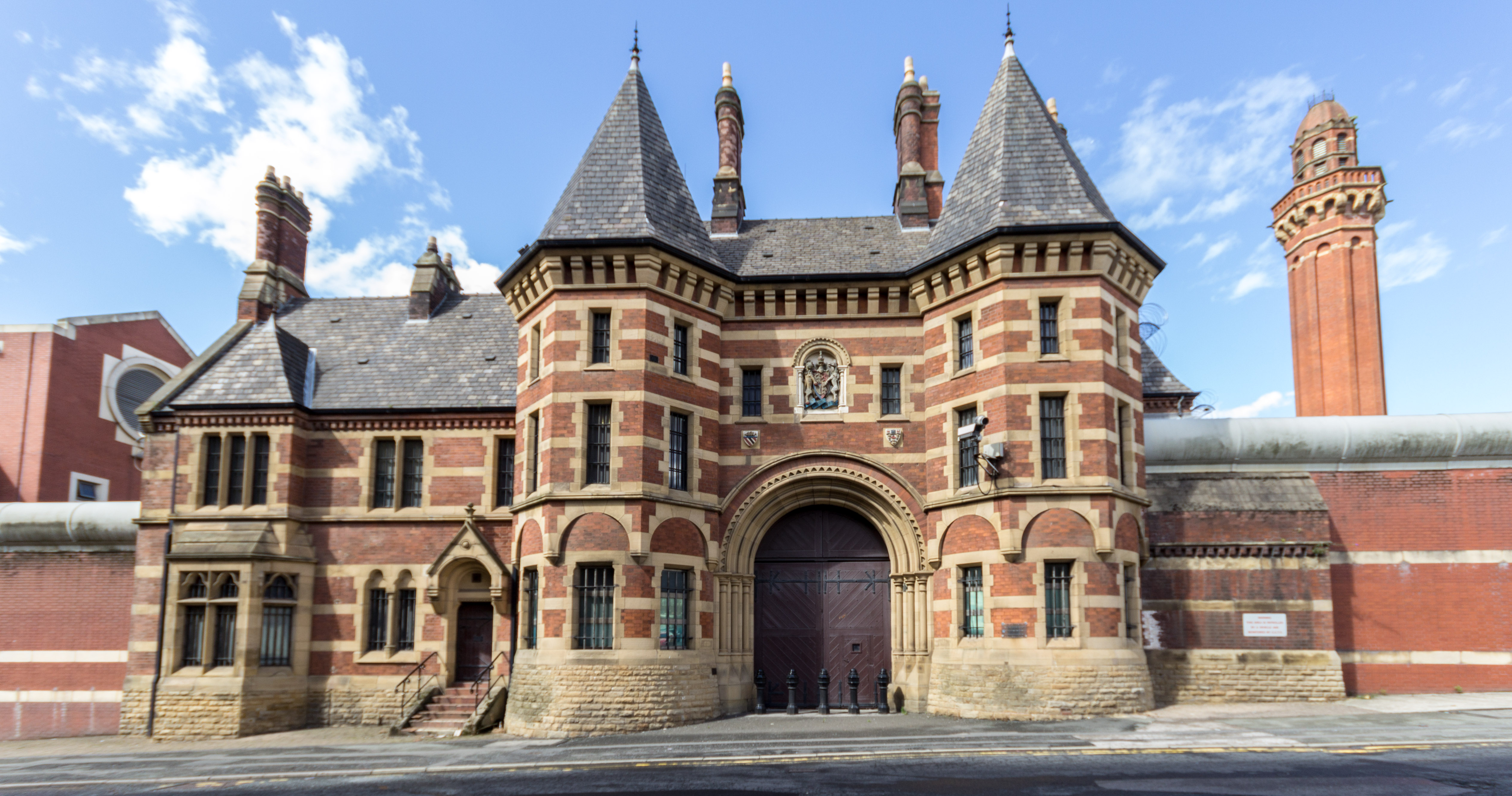
Strangeways Prison, where Roberts worked as an education officer from 1957

Imprisoned Tongues was Roberts's first book. Published in 1968 by Manchester University Press, it offered an account of his experiences teaching illiterate and poorly literate prisoners to read and write. He ran hourly classes in 16-week courses. In the opening chapter, he explains that "since little seems to have been written about teaching the illiterate and educationally backward in gaol, I have tried to set down an account of my own experience in the hope that it might be useful to tutors and others coming new to the prison service". Roberts advocated a learning programme in which beginners entered a small class and progressed to larger group sessions once they had mastered the basics. The book included chapters on the prisoners' backgrounds, the use of role playing and group teaching styles, communication methods, and the involvement of prison staff, as well as a glossary of slang.

Writing in The Guardian, P. J. Monkhouse praised the book for its "lively" prose and sympathy. In the British Journal of Psychiatric Social Work, E. E. Irvine commended Roberts's "chatty" style and rich array of anecdotes. He felt that the book would be "illuminating" reading for new prison welfare officers and that Roberts's technique to engage prisoners in creative writing was especially interesting. Writing in The British Journal of Criminology, Tony Parker also praised the book for sympathetically shedding light on prisoners' lives and experiences; he described Roberts's methods as "fascinating", though took issue with the way Roberts preserved the prisoners' accents in recorded speech. By contrast, John Gunn (in The British Journal of Psychiatry) thought the book fell short of its aim to examine the sociology of the prison because of its limited "form": in his view, its themes were undeveloped, its structure arbitrary and the long quotes distracting. He would have preferred more statistics, but conceded that the work had useful practical advice about prison management, was right to emphasise communication issues between prisoners and psychiatrists, and included "illuminating" extracts of the prisoners' work. The reviewer J. G. Mitchel also wrote that more statistical information would have improved the work, but that Roberts's descriptions of the prisoners' experiences and his extracts of the prisoners' work were the book's "strengths". Mitchel felt that Roberts's teaching method (the look-and-say technique) was outdated and noted his rejection of the new phonic approach.

=== The Classic Slum (1971) ===
The Classic Slum: Salford Life in the First Quarter of the Century was published by Manchester University Press in 1971 and reprinted by Pelican Books (1978) and Penguin Books (1990). Mixing autobiography, social history and oral history, it gave an account of the Salford "village" of Roberts's childhood and adolescence. In the preface, Roberts explains that he wrote the book because descriptions of working-class life in the period "naturally lacked the factuality that first-hand experience might have given it; few historians are the sons of labourers". He hoped that, as someone who grew up in that environment, he would be able to provide such an account. Its thematically arranged chapters explored the class structure of the "slum", its residents' possessions and material culture, their manners, food and drink, culture, and schooling. Another chapter discussed prison and the Poor Law system. The final two chapters in the book focused on the First World War and its aftermath. Three appendices each contained a short story: "Conducted Tour" narrated two children exploring their environment, "Snuffy" was about a boy in a library, and "Bronzed Mushrooms" followed a brass worker in the mid-1880s. The book included material on childhood, women's experiences, sexuality, antisemitism, racism, politics, morality and religion; it also articulated Roberts's argument that the First World War profoundly and permanently altered the material, social and political lives of the residents. (Note: Roberts argues that the pressures of the First World War increased the movement of unskilled labour into skilled jobs. This "dilution" demystified skilled occupations (which had been previously fiercely protected by the trade unions and often kept exclusive to the sons of skilled labourers), resulted in a rapid increase in trade union membership amongst those previously in unskilled jobs, and gave a new-found confidence and material affluence to these sections of the population (as wage differentials fell and wages themselves rose). Roberts argues that this finally broadened the social and cultural horizons of "slum villages" like his, and led to the spread of new forms of popular entertainment and greater liberation for a new generation of men and women. He argues that these processes also weakened the hold of Tory politics on the unskilled labourer and led to the growth of the labour movement, while experiences of the war itself eroded some older attitudes and bred more tolerance in his community.)

==== Contemporary reception ====
The book was widely acclaimed on its release. Marghanita Laski in The Times called it the "direct, personally-reminiscent examination we would always wish to have of life in any class". Reviewing the book for The Daily Telegraph, Michael Kennedy praised the "vivid, moving, funny, unsentimental" first-hand descriptions, arguing that it "may well be a classic book"; in The Sunday Telegraph, J. W. M. Thompson praised the way Roberts mixed together personal reminisces with social history. Keith Dewhurst for The Guardian commended Roberts's richly textured account and the wealth of information he included. Its usefulness as a source was also praised in an anonymous review for The Guardian, which lauded the inclusion of photographs of Edwardian Salford by Samuel Coulthurst.

The social historian Harold Perkin wrote in The English Historical Review that The Classic Slum was "a remarkable book, and Robert Roberts is a remarkable author ... His account is a source of first importance for the social history of the Edwardian age". In the journal Sociology, Campbell Balfour called the book "unusual, interesting, and highly readable" and argued that "as a descriptive study of lower working class life it can have few equals". Gerald D. Suttles's review in Contemporary Sociology praised it as "an interesting and revealing social history... [it is] social history and ethnography ... done well". Writing in The British Journal of Sociology, Peter Marris was impressed by the "brilliant evocation" Roberts provided of the Salford of his youth and thought the short stories at the end were "masterpieces" if "awkwardly labelled". C. A. Woolfson, in Urban Studies, also praised the work for its historical dimension but suggested that its lack of material on the Irish experience was a limitation. For Teaching History, the reviewer John Standen called it "exceptional" and praised its readability.

It was met with a more qualified response by E. W. Cooney in The Economic History Review; while noting its "vivid, richly textured and sometimes moving" portrayal of working-class life and its "interesting" arguments about conservatism, status and illiteracy, Cooney observed that much of the material was solely based on memory or on conversations with other people which took place half a century before publication. The reviewer also critiqued the book for its lack of citations and for Roberts's generalisations based on his own experiences. Though praising its evidentiary value and insights into slum life, P. J. Waller (in the journal History) also critiqued Roberts's limited referencing, and felt that the weaker points of the book occurred where he engaged with academic debates.

==== Themes and contributions to scholarship ====
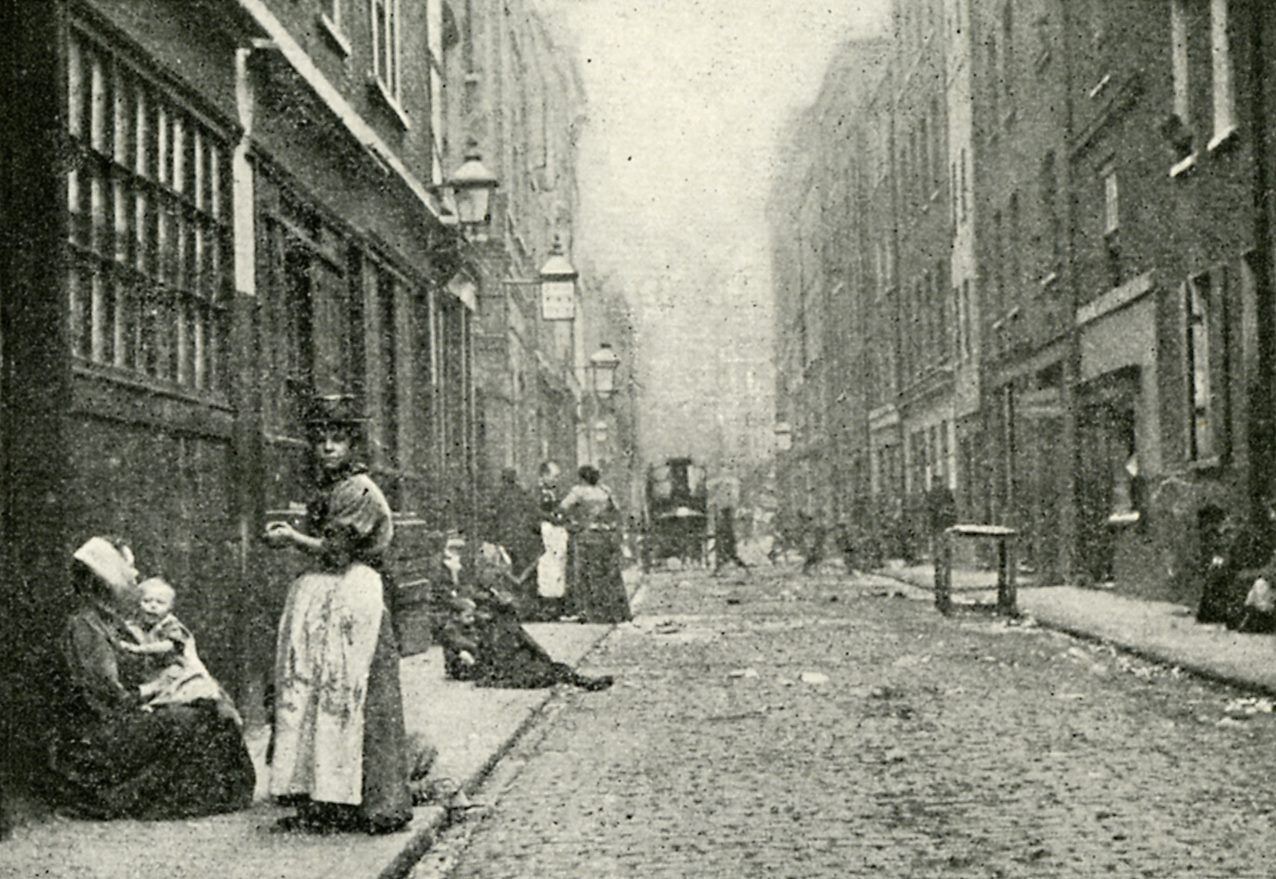
The Classic Slum offered a vivid description of life in an impoverished Edwardian neighbourhood; seen here is a similar district of London's East End in 1902

Writing in The Oxford Dictionary of National Biography, the historian Andrew Davies described The Classic Slum as Roberts's "most influential book". Alongside Roberts's other book A Ragged Schooling and Walter Greenwood's Salford-based novel Love on the Dole (1933), Davies, Steven Fielding and Terry Wyke observed that The Classic Slum has "been taken to typify the national working-class experience [and] played an important role in shaping our understanding of working-class life". The historian Florence Sutcliffe-Braithwaite has described the book as "a seminal account of the Edwardian working classes", and in a literature review for the journal Sociology Compass, Ian Roberts described it as a "classic" text in working-class studies and community studies.

The Classic Slum has been characterised by the historian Jon Lawrence as "anti-romantic". In the words of the literary scholar Michael Rosenfeld, Roberts saw his past as something "to overcome and transform, not affirm and validate". Roberts was writing in opposition to post-war sociologists who emphasised positive features of communities like his; he asserted that "close propinquity, together with cultural poverty, led as much to enmity as it did to friendship". He was also sceptical of those residents who expressed nostalgia during the post-war slum clearance programmes. In the late 1990s and 2000s, historians "built upon" Roberts's work to critique "romanticised accounts of working-class community" in works like Michael Young and Peter Willmott's 1957 book Family and Kinship in East London (which in its depiction of kinship networks otherwise had similarities with Roberts's work).

Sociologists had often looked to the working class as the potentially revolutionary proletariat, but Roberts gave the impression of a conservative class at odds with the more radical one noted by earlier writers; in his view, the intense poverty and struggle to survive led residents to accept the socioeconomic structures that determined their situation and make do as best they could under the circumstances. He emphasised how the residents were highly differentiated, aware of complex social distinctions between each other and formed from a mix of social groups divided along occupational and social status lines. The Classic Slum therefore depicted a complex status hierarchy focused on a code of respectability. (Note: The historian David Cannadine has pointed to the "range and richness of [Roberts's] vocabulary as he described the 'social ladder' or 'social pyramid' in terms of ranks and orders, gradations and degrees, layers and strata, classes and caste", using a range of models of class simultaneously. By contrast, the historian Jon Lawrence argues that Roberts was "offering two distinct perspectives" on class identities: firstly, he used an internally-focused model which emphasised the distinctions between residents; and he deployed an externally-focused one which stressed the deep distinction between residents and people outside of the slum.) This was partly because many residents had to depend on credit supply which was determined by their respectability and their reputation for financial solvency. Roberts's impression of the district thus sharply contrasted with the notion of the cohesive "traditional working class" used by many social scientists. (Note: The historian Jon Lawrence explains that the concept was rooted in images of urban working-class neighbourhoods with "cohesive, culturally rich 'communities' with their own value systems". He argues that it was often used to articulate concerns that certain social reforms might destabilise or damage the working class.) Roberts emphasised the political conservatism prevalent among the labouring sections especially, describing them as "politically illiterate" and highlighting their apathy and deferential attitudes. He also expressed his frustration at the disdain for art, literacy and high culture held by many residents (men, for instance, associated an interest in reading with homosexuality, which was highly stigmatised). As such, Rosenfeld has argued that Roberts's writing captures his "disappointed radicalism". Roberts did recognise, however, that conservatism was a product of the poverty residents lived with, their feelings of powerlessness and their lack of education. In the words of one reviewer, he saw "courage" in their struggle to survive, even if he was disappointed by the "subservience" it produced.

The cultural studies scholar Susanne Schmid has noted that Roberts was unusual in incorporating the voices of his working-class subjects in the account; she has argued that, unlike many social commentators, he presented residents as active agents who "constantly interact[ed] through communal activities, through gossip, through competing displays of their modest prosperity". Whereas outside observers (including sympathetic ones like Engels and George Orwell) often depicted the working class as both passive and dirty, Roberts emphasised their constant striving to keep clean, which stemmed from their desire for respectability. Schmid has also argued that Roberts expressed some nostalgia for a "pure" form of English working class culture, which had become Americanised by the time he wrote the book.

=== A Ragged Schooling (1976) ===
Roberts's third and final book was his autobiography A Ragged Schooling: Growing up in the Classic Slum, published by Manchester University Press in 1976 and reprinted in paperback by Fontana in 1978. There were 19 chapters recounting aspects of Roberts's childhood, adolescence and early adulthood. Some of the chapters were thematically organised, covering topics such as food, class, religion, fears, sexuality and superstitions. Chapters 15 focused on the First World War and was followed by accounts of Roberts's schooling, apprenticeship, working conditions and trade unionism, and his self-guided education.

Writing for The Observer, Paul Bailey called it a "memoir of quite extraordinary richness"; he found parts of it moving and others funny, and thought it just as good as The Classic Slum. Selina Hastings, for The Sunday Telegraph, praised the book for its humour. In a review for the Birmingham Daily Post, Roy Palmer commended the "splendid book, full of humour, life, compassion and humanity"; he praised the "sheer strength and depth of writing" and found the imagery evocative. For the Lichfield Mercury it was "a remarkable piece of living history".

Though not as influential as The Classic Slum, it confirmed to Davies Roberts's "reputation as one of the most sensitive chroniclers of English working-class life". Like his previous book, it contained a wealth of material about the working class and has been influential in historical writing on the topic. It has also been used by scholars interested in women's experiences and sexuality in working-class communities. A Ragged Schooling is, however, a highly personal and "intimate" account, focused on Roberts's experiences through to his young adulthood. Publishers Weekly noted that the book was "thematic and anecdotal: at its core are the mysteries of sex, religion, work and the rigors of daily life". His relationship with his mother was also a key theme; he admired her work ethic and attitude towards education, and the book ends with her death.
