= Rana Mitter =

British historian and political scientist

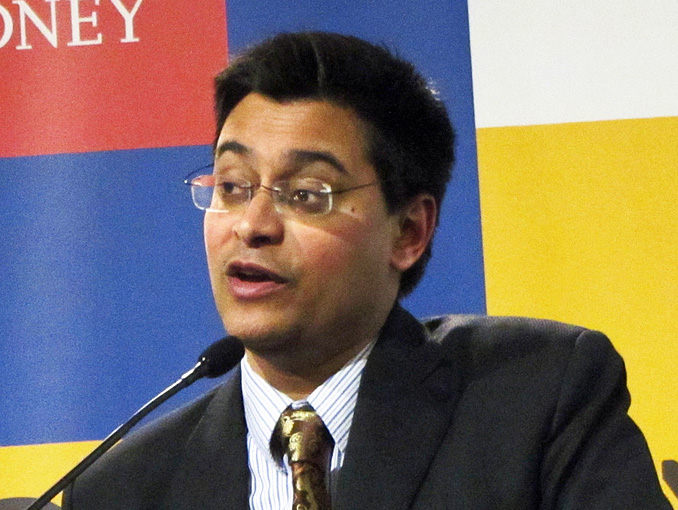
- Mitter in 2013
- Born: Rana Shantashil Rajyeswar Mitter; 11 August 1969 (age 57); Cambridge, United Kingdom

Academic background
- Education: King's College, Cambridge (BA, MA, PhD)
- Thesis: The Japanese occupation of Manchuria (1996)

Academic work
- Discipline: Historian
- Sub-discipline: History of the Republic of China, contemporary politics of China
- Institutions: Harvard University
- Website: hks.harvard.edu/faculty/rana-mitter

Rana Shantashil Rajyeswar Mitter OBE FBA (born 11 August 1969) is a British historian and political scientist who specialises in modern Chinese history. He is ST Lee Chair in US-Asia Relations at the Harvard Kennedy School.

== Early life and education ==
Mitter, of Indian Bengali descent, was born in Cambridge and grew up on the south coast of England, near Brighton. His father, Partha Mitter, taught art history at the University of Sussex and his mother, Swasti Mitter, was a professor of gender and technology at the University of Brighton. Mitter was educated at Lancing College and King's College, Cambridge, where he received a BA (1992), MPhil (1993), and PhD (1996). He was a Kennedy Scholar at Harvard University in 1993 and 1994. In 1991 he was elected president of the Cambridge Union.

== Academic career ==
He was formerly director of Oxford's China Centre and Fellow and Vice-Master of St Cross College, and until 2023 was professor of the history and politics of modern China at the University of Oxford.

His 2013 book China's War with Japan, 1937-1945: The Struggle for Survival (titled Forgotten Ally: China's War with Japan, 1937-45 for publication in the US), about the Second Sino-Japanese War, was well received by critics.

On 16 July 2015, he was elected a Fellow of the British Academy (FBA).

He was appointed Officer of the Order of the British Empire (OBE) in the 2019 Birthday Honours for services to education.

He has published several op-eds for The Guardian on contemporary Chinese politics. He is also a regular presenter for Free Thinking on BBC Radio.

== Publications ==
=== Books ===
- Mitter, Rana (2000). The Manchurian Myth: Nationalism, Resistance and Collaboration in Modern China. University of California Press. ISBN 978-0520221116.
- —— (2004). A Bitter Revolution: China's Struggle with the Modern World. Oxford University Press. ISBN 978-0192803412.
- —— (2013). China's War with Japan, 1937-1945 : The Struggle for Survival. London: Allen Lane. ISBN 978-0141031453.
- —— (2020). China's Good War: How World War II Is Shaping a New Nationalism. Cambridge, Massachusetts: Belknap Press. ISBN 978-0674984264.

=== Selected articles ===
- —— (20 February 2024). "The Real Roots of Xi Jinping Thought". Foreign Affairs. Vol. 103, no. 2.
