= Sheila Rowbotham =

English socialist feminist theorist and historian (born 1943)

Sheila Rowbotham FRSA
- Born: 27 February 1943 (age 83); Leeds, England

Academic background
- Education: St Hilda's College, Oxford; University of London
- Influences: Beryl Smalley; Dorothy Thompson; E. P. Thompson

Academic work
- Discipline: History; women's studies
- Sub-discipline: Feminist theory; gender history; labour history; social history
- School or tradition: Socialist feminism; libertarian socialism; New Left
- Institutions: University of Manchester
- Notable works: Hidden from History (1973); Beyond the Fragments (1979); A Century of Women (1997); Threads Through Time (1999)
- Influenced: Ashley Dawson; Gary Kinsman; Lucy Noakes

Sheila Rowbotham (born 27 February 1943) is an English socialist feminist theorist and historian. She is the author of many notable books in the field of women's studies, including Hidden from History (1973), Beyond the Fragments (1979), A Century of Women (1997) and Threads Through Time (1999), as well as the 2021 memoir Daring to Hope: My Life in the 1970s. She has lived in Bristol since 2010.

== Early life ==
Rowbotham was born on 27 February 1943 in Leeds (in present-day West Yorkshire), the daughter of a salesman for an engineering company and an office clerk. From an early age, she was deeply interested in history. She has written that traditional political history "left her cold", but she credited Olga Wilkinson, one of her teachers, with encouraging her interest in social history by showing that history "belonged to the present, not to the history textbooks".

Rowbotham attended St Hilda's College at Oxford University and then the University of London. She began her working life as a teacher in comprehensive schools and institutes of higher or adult education. While attending St Hilda's College, Rowbotham found the syllabus with its heavy focus on political history to be of no interest to her. She has described herself at the time she started her studies at St Hilda's as "not at all left-wing" and a "mystical beatnik hippie-type", although she soon started to make contact with leftists, including fellow Oxford student Gareth Stedman Jones, who became a professional historian. Rowbotham also met E. P. Thompson and Dorothy Thompson at this time, after a tutor recommended that she should visit them due to their interest in Chartism and the history of working-class movements: Rowbotham read the proofs of E. P. Thompson's The Making of the English Working Class, which she has described as "like no other history book I'd read". Through her involvement in the Campaign for Nuclear Disarmament and various socialist circles, among them the Labour Party's youth wing, the Young Socialists, Rowbotham was introduced to Karl Marx's ideas. Soon disenchanted with the direction of party politics, she immersed herself in a variety of left-wing campaigns, including writing for the radical political newspaper Black Dwarf, whose editorial board she also joined.

== Outlook on feminism ==
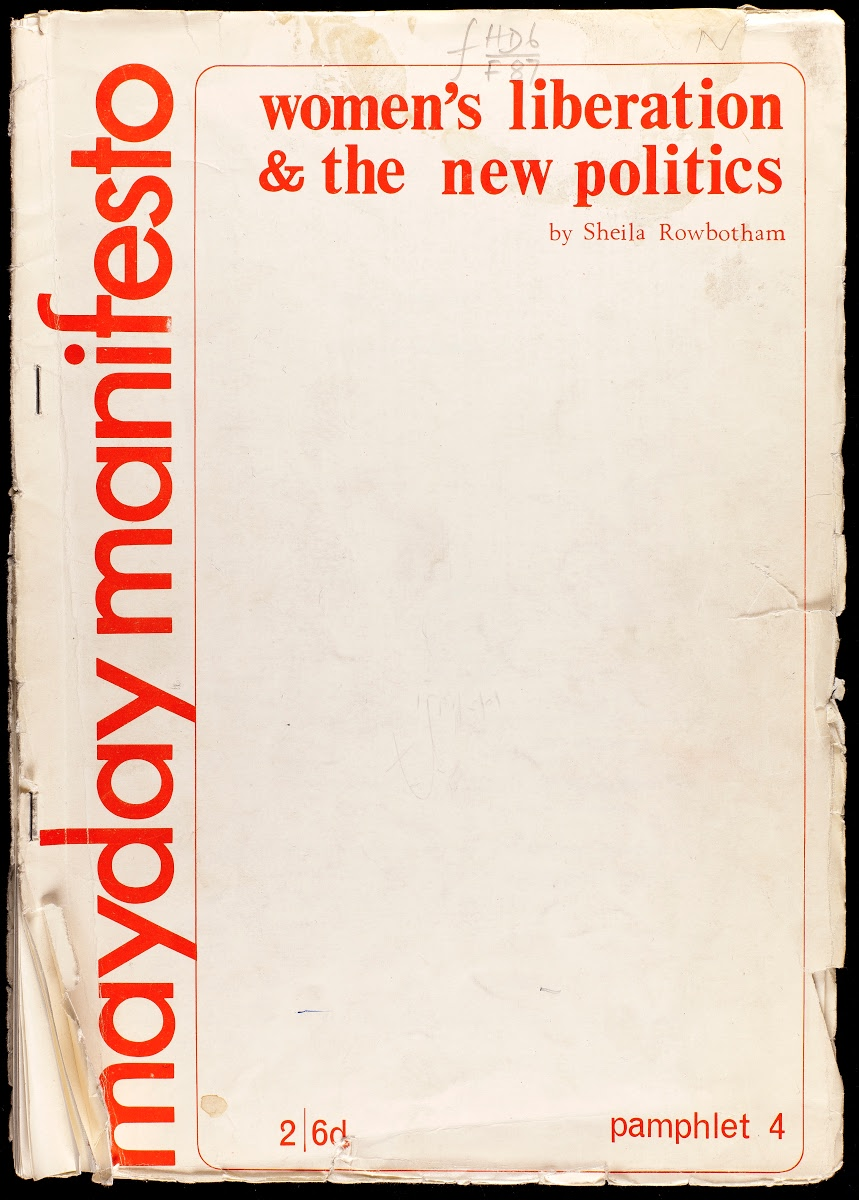
Women's Liberation and the New Politics (1969)

In the 1960s, Rowbotham together with Sally Alexander and Anna Davin and was one of the founders and leaders of the History Workshop movement associated with Ruskin College. The History Workshop movement sought to write a "history from below" by focusing on the experiences of ordinary people by marrying the Marxist tradition of history-writing to the labour movement tradition. Towards the end of the 1960s, Rowbotham became involved in the growing women's liberation movement (also known as second-wave feminism); in 1969, she published her pamphlet Women's Liberation and the New Politics, which argued that Socialist theory needed to consider the oppression of women in cultural as well as economic terms. She was heavily involved in the conference Beyond the Fragments (eventually a book), which attempted to draw together democratic socialist and socialist feminist currents in Britain. She was also one of the organisers of the National Women's Liberation Conference in 1970, which set out demands in relation to issues such as equal pay, education and free contraception.

Between 1983 and 1986, Rowbotham served as the editor of Jobs for Change, the newspaper of the Greater London Council (GLC). At this time she was also involved in the GLC's Popular Planning Unit alongside Hilary Wainwright, which was involved in developing democratic approaches to economic planning. Since then, Rowbotham has produced numerous studies and articles expanding upon her theory, which argues that as women's oppression is a result of both economic and cultural forces then a dualist perspective (socialist feminism) that examines both the public and private sphere is required to work towards liberation.

Rowbotham was especially influenced by Marxist social history as practised by E. P. Thompson and Dorothy Thompson. Combining a Marxist analysis with feminism, Rowbotham contends that capitalism not only systematically oppresses the working class, but also particularly oppresses women. In her view, women are doubly oppressed as they are forced to sell their labour to survive, but also forced to use their labour to support their husbands and children. Rowbotham is critical of traditional Marxist history for what she sees as the neglect of such issues as family history, the role of housewives in supporting the economy, sexuality, and maternity. Rowbothbam argued that the traditional Marxist history by focusing on a class conflict missed sexual oppression. Likewise, she has criticized those Marxists who contend that sexism did not exist in Communist societies with the claim that sexism was caused by capitalism as doing a disservice to history. Rowbotham has argued that those Marxist historians who see women's history as a "distraction" from the main theme of the class struggle are presenting a misleading version of history.

In her major early books Women, Resistance and Revolution (1972) and Hidden from History (1973), Rowbotham put her ideas into practice by examining the experience of women in radical and revolutionary movements in Cuba, Algeria, Vietnam, China, Russia, France and Britain from the 17th century to the 20th centuries. In her opinion, working within the established order has never brought women any advances, and only through revolutionary socialist movements have women made any social gains. Rowbotham has argued that though male revolutionaries are willing to accept women as partners as long as the revolution lasts, once the revolution is over, women are expected to return to their traditional roles.

As an example of her thesis in Women, Resistance and Revolution, she examined the role of Russian women in the late Imperial, Provisional government, and early Soviet periods. Rowbotham wrote that women played a key role in toppling Emperor Nicholas II and with him the House of Romanov, which had reigned since 1612, noting that the February Revolution in Petrograd began with women's demonstrations on International Women's Day. Rowbotham has praised Vladimir Lenin and the other Bolshevik leaders in Women, Resistance and Revolution for legalising abortion, divorce, and contraception plus founding the Zhenotdel (women's department) together with socialised restaurants, health care and laundries. Rowbothham argued that the changes experienced by Russian women from the Imperial era, where superstition, poverty, illiteracy, and the patriarchal view as women as property were the norm to the early Soviet era were an improvement. She has criticised Soviet policies starting with the First five-year plan of 1928–33 for not only expecting women to work full-time, but also to take on the burdens of housework and child-raising while at the same time banning abortion and birth control. Rowbotham argued that the Stalinist era marked the beginning of a retrogression for Soviet women, as Stalin to a certain extent brought about a return to traditional Russian values, most notably via a lavish personality cult that incorporated Tsarist imagery and iconography.

Rowbotham has contended that to achieve women's liberation requires a "revolution within the revolution" or freedom from the "colony within the colony" as sexism was and is just as entrenched in left-wing men as it is on the right. In Women, Resistance and Revolution, she wrote that though women were allowed to participate in revolutionary events such as the French Revolution and the Chinese civil war, once a new order was established, whether under Napoleon or Mao Zedong, a retrogression to the previous patriarchal values took place. Writing about the Vietnam War, which was then on-going, Rowbotham stated that Vietnamese women involved serving in the Viet Cong especially felt committed to the cause because of the dangers of rape from American GIs, from "massacres which none are spared" and the dangers of birth defects caused by the spraying of Agent Orange. Rowbotham was one of the first to draw attention in the West to the fact that since spraying of the South Vietnamese countryside with Agent Orange herbicide stated in 1961, "an abnormally high percentage of miscarriages, stillbirths, and deformed children" had been born. She maintains that capitalism and sexism/patriarchy are so closely linked that the only way to destroy both is a radical change in the "cultural conditioning of men and women, upbringing of children, shape of the places we live in, legal structure of society, sexuality and the very nature of work". Rowbotham's books were, and are still well received in feminist circles, and their accessibility has allowed them to remain popular.

In Hidden from History, she examined British women's history from the 17th century to 1930 from a Marxist viewpoint. For Rowbotham, the history of British women could best be defined through class oppression, the Industrial Revolution, and sexism.

In her 1973 book Women's Consciousness, Men's World, Rowbotham maintained that the domestic household work done by women was a part of commodity production as it allowed the production and reproduction of men's labour, thereby challenging a key tenet of traditional Marxist history. However, she claimed that the human family was not just an instrument for disciplining and subjecting women to capitalism, but was a place where potentially humans could take refuge from what Rowbotham sees as the commodification of human relationships under capitalism. In Rowbotham's view, raising children, sexuality, and the need for human relationships means that the family can rarely be reduced down to a service commodity. Likewise, she argues for a Marxist history that accords equal importance to the role of both sexes in the history of revolutions, unions, political parties and protest movements.

In Women's Consciousness, Men's World, Rowbotham presented her analysis of contemporary social conditions in Britain from a Marxist-feminist perspective. She argues that origins of sexism predate capitalism, and that the institution of marriage closely resembles feudalism. She contends that as in feudalism serfs were obliged to serve their masters, wives are likewise contracted to serve their husbands. The historian Susan Cook praised Rowbotham for tracing a "female consciousness" in Britain from the 17th century onward through "complex webs" of economic and political change. The clarity of Rowbotham's writing together with her picture of what Cook called the "potential contradictory nature of women's desires and needs" ensured that Women's Consciousness, Men's World reached a broad audience.

In her 1977 book Dutiful Daughters, co-written with Jean McCrindle, Rowbotham interviewed fourteen women of lower-middle-class and working-class origin. Though Rowbotham notes that the life stories of women interviewed for Dutiful Daughters were not intended to be representative of all British women, she argues that these snap-shots of different lives, if combined with enough other oral histories, can provide an understanding of the experience of ordinary women.

As part of relating the personal to the political, Rowbotham has examined the sexual and political beliefs of such late 19th- to early 20th-century radicals as the gay rights activist Edward Carpenter, who saw socialism as way for humanity's spiritual rebirth, and the feminist Stella Browne who fought for the legalisation of birth control and argued for the importance of sexual pleasure for women. Rowbotham argued that the political beliefs of Carpenter and Browne were closely tied to their personal lives.

Besides her work as a historian, Rowbotham has been active in left-wing causes. In her book Beyond the Fragments, co-written with Hilary Wainwright and Lynne Segal, Rowbotham called for the various fractions of the British left to unite, and work for a socialist Britain through grassroots activism. She has great faith in activist social movements working from the bottom up to change society, and feels that historians have a duty to contribute to social change by writing books that expose what she sees as the evils of society.

Placing Rowbotham as one (of three women) in her 2000 collection of Fifty Key Thinkers on History, Hughes-Warrington describes Rowbotham as a researcher who "draws upon a wide variety of sources including songs, novels, governmental and organisational records, pamphlets, other historical works and her own experiences"

Hughes-Warrington noting her audience of ordinary men and women (and their history), considered it unsurprising that "she rejects much of the current literature of gender studies, Marxist theory and historiography. For her, the importation of French structuralist and post-structuralist perspectives have not only made academic writing inaccessible to the public, but have also discouraged academics from taking an interest in the developing world and in the life and work of people with different heritages from their own."

Referring to Rowbotham's "The Trouble with Patriarchy", Hughes-Warrington concurs with the need to have a clear idea as to what patriarchy is in order to struggle against it and quotes Rowbotham's definition in full. She finds fault with those feminists who deny men a role in the battle against sexism. In her opinion, women and men should stand equally against both capitalism and sexism to achieve radical social reorganisation. In a 2011 interview, Rowbotham criticised Communism, claiming that Leninism "narrow the struggle of women's emancipation", and sees "libertarian socialism", "ethical socialism" and anarchism as providing a more vital understanding of women's needs.

== Recent professional life ==
In 2004, Rowbotham was elected as a fellow of the Royal Society of Arts. She was Professor of Gender and Labour History, Sociology at the University of Manchester, England, until her involuntary retirement in 2008.

Rowbotham's involuntary retirement from the University of Manchester caused protest from students. The Facebook group Save Sheila Rowbotham was established to campaign for her continuation as a Lecturer. The same year she published the first-ever biography of Edward Carpenter, entitled Edward Carpenter: A Life of Liberty and Love and did continue to teach within the Sociology department at Manchester. In Autumn 2008, her request to stay on after the age of 65 to a third of her job was refused. However, after protests from students, academics and others internationally the university offered Rowbotham a third of research professorship. She is currently a Simon Professor.

Rowbotham's 2009 biography of Edward Carpenter was shortlisted for the James Tait Black Memorial Prize.

Rowbotham was the Eccles Centre Writer in Residence for 2012 at the British Library, where her research enabled completion of Rebel Crossings.

She was portrayed by the actor Jo Herbert in the British film Misbehaviour (2020) about the 1970 Miss World protests.

Reviewing Rowbotham's 2021 memoir, Daring to Hope: My Life in the 1970s, Yvonne Roberts wrote in The Guardian that the book "records an exhausting life of activism, lecturing, pamphleteering, editing, book writing, journalism, travelling, speech-making, struggling with the emerging ideas and conflicts....Rowbotham has wisdom – and wit."

In recognition of her achievements, Rowbotham was awarded an honorary degree (Doctor of Laws) by the University of Bristol in 2022.

== Archives ==
Papers of Sheila Rowbotham are held at the Women's Library at the Library of the London School of Economics

== Bibliography ==
- Women's Liberation and the New Politics (Spokesman, 1969). ISBN 0-85124-008-9
- Women, Resistance and Revolution (Allen Lane, 1972; Verso, 2014).
- Woman's Consciousness, Man's World (Pelican, 1973; Verso, 2015).
- Hidden from History: 300 years of Women's Oppression and the Fight Against It (Pluto Press, 1973, 1992).
- A New World for Women: Stella Browne, Socialist Feminist (Pluto Press, 1977). ISBN 0-904383-54-7
- Dutiful Daughters: Women Talk About Their Lives, with Jean McCrindle (Viking Press, 1977). ISBN 0-7139-1050-X
- Beyond the Fragments: Feminism and the Making of Socialism, with Lynne Segal and Hilary Wainwright (Merlin Press, 1979, 2012).
- Dreams and Dilemmas: Collected Writings (Virago Press, 1983).
- Friends of Alice Wheeldon (Pluto Press, 1986). ISBN 0745301568
- Friends of Alice Wheeldon – 2nd Edition, The Anti-War Activist Accused of Plotting to Kill Lloyd George (Pluto Press, 2015). ISBN 9780745335759
- The Past Is Before Us: Feminism in Action Since the 1960s (HarperCollins, 1989). ISBN 0-04-440365-8
- A Century of Women: The History of Women in Britain and the United States (Viking, 1997).
- Dignity and Daily Bread: New Forms of Economic Organization Among Poor Women in the Third World and the First, with Swasti Mitter (Routledge, 1993).
- Women in Movement: Feminism and Social Action (Routledge, 1993). ISBN 0-415-90652-0
- Homeworkers Worldwide (Merlin Press, 1993). ISBN 0-85036-434-5
- Women Encounter Technology: Changing Patterns of Employment in the Third World, with Swasti Mitter (Routledge, 1997). ISBN 0-415-14118-4
- A Century of Women: The History of Women in Britain and the United States (Viking, 1997). ISBN 0-670-87420-5
- Threads Through Time: Writings on History and Autobiography (Penguin Books, 1999). ISBN 0-14-027554-1
- Promise of a Dream: Remembering the Sixties (Allen Lane, 2000). ISBN 0-7139-9446-0 and (Verso, 2000). ISBN 1-85984-622-X
- Looking at Class: Film Television and the Working Class in Britain, with Huw Beynon (River Oram Press, 2001). ISBN 1-85489-121-9
- Women Resist Globalization; Mobilizing for Livelihood and Rights, with Stephanie Linkogle (Zed Books, 2001). ISBN 1-85649-877-8
- Edward Carpenter: A Life of Liberty and Love (Verso, 2008). ISBN 978-1-84467-295-0 pk (Verso, 2009). ISBN 978-1-84467-421-3
- Dreamers of a New Day: Women Who Invented the Twentieth Century (Verso, 2010).
- Rebel Crossings: New Women, Free Lovers, and Radicals in Britain and America (Verso, 2016).
- Daring to Hope: My Life in the 1970s (Verso, 2021). ISBN 9781839763892

== See also ==
- Feminism in the United Kingdom
- Feminist history
- Social history of England
