= Ian Gazeley =

British economic historian

Ian Stuart Gazeley, FAcSS, is an economic historian specialising in poverty and nutrition in Britain.

== Career ==
He completed an undergraduate degree in Economics and Economic History at the University of Warwick and then a doctorate (DPhil, 1984) in Modern History at St Antony's College, Oxford, with a thesis entitled The standard of living of the working classes, 1881–1912: The cost of living and the analysis of family budgets. He then held a Prize Research Fellowship at Nuffield College, Oxford, before joining the University of Sussex in 1985; until 2018, he was Professor of Economic History there, and has since been an emeritus professor in the History Faculty. In 2016, he was elected a Fellow of the Academy of Social Sciences. In 2018, Gazeley took up a visiting professorship in the Department of Economic History at the London School of Economics.

=== Publications ===
Gazeley's published works include:

- Poverty in Britain, 1900–65, Social History in Perspective Series (Palgrave Macmillan, 2003).
- (edited with Nicholas Crafts and Andrew Newell) Work and Pay in Twentieth-Century Britain (Oxford University Press, 2007).
- "Women's pay in British industry during the Second World War", Economic History Review, vol. 61, no. 3 (2008). pp. 651–671.
- (with Andrew Newell) "Poverty in Edwardian Britain", Economic History Review, vol. 64, no. 1 (2011), pp. 52–71.
- (with Claire Langhamer) "The meanings of happiness in Mass Observation's Bolton", History Workshop Journal, vol. 75, no. 1 (2012), pp. 159–189.
- (with Sara Horrell) "Nutrition in the English agricultural labourer's household over the course of the long nineteenth century", Economic History Review, vol. 66, no. 3 (2013). pp. 757–784.
- (with Andrew Newell) "Urban working-class food consumption and nutrition in Britain in 1904", Economic History Review, vol. 68, no. 1 (2015), pp. 101–122.

== Reviews of published books ==
Poverty in Britain, 1900–65

- D. J. Oddy for English Historical Review (vol. 56, no. 4 (2003), pp. 798–799).
- Rodney Lowe for Contemporary British History (vol. 19, no. 1 (2005), pp. 97–98).
- John Veit-Wilson for Journal of Social Policy (vol. 33, no. 2 (2004), pp. 340–342).
- In International Review of Social History, (vol. 51, no. 2 (2006), p. 347).

Work and Pay in Twentieth-Century Britain

- Rowan McWilliam for Labour History Review (vol. 74, no. 2 (2009), p. 213).
