= Lucy Noakes =

British historian (born 1964)

Lucy Noakes FRHistS
- Born: 1964 (age 61–62)
- Other name: Lucy Caroline Noakes

Academic background
- Education: University of Sussex
- Thesis: Gender and British National Identity in Wartime (1996)
- Influences: Sheila Rowbotham; E. P. Thompson

Academic work
- Discipline: History
- Sub-discipline: Cultural history; social history
- Institutions: University of Brighton; University of Essex

Lucy Caroline Noakes FRHistS (born 1964) is a British historian. Since 2017, she has been Rab Butler Professor of Modern History at the University of Essex. She has served as the President of the Royal Historical Society since 2024.

== Biography ==
Noakes has said that she became interested in history through left-wing politics; she was inspired by E. P. Thompson's speeches at CND rallies and by his book The Making of the English Working Class to uncover the lives of ordinary people, especially women (owing to the influence of feminist historians like Sheila Rowbotham). She completed a Bachelor of Arts (BA) degree at the University of Sussex and stayed there to complete a Doctor of Philosophy (DPhil) degree, which was awarded in 1996 for her thesis Gender and British National Identity in Wartime: A Study of the Links Between Gender and National Identity in Britain in the Second World War, the Falklands War, and the Gulf War.

After her doctorate, Noakes worked at Southampton Solent University and the University of Portsmouth, before joining the University of Brighton in 2007, where she eventually became Reader in Social and Cultural History. In 2017, Noakes was appointed Rab Butler Professor of Modern History at the University of Essex. As of 2014, she is a Fellow of the Royal Historical Society.

== Research ==
Noakes's research has focused on war, memory, gender and national identity in modern Britain, in particular on the experiences and memories of people who were involved in First and Second World War, as well as gendered identities in wartime, and on women's experiences of war. Her publications include:

Books

- The People's Victory. VE Day Through the Eyes of Those Who Were There (Atlantic Press, 2025) ISBN 9781838955151
- Dying for the Nation: Death, Grief and Bereavement in Second World War Britain (Manchester UNiversity Press, 2020) ISBN 9780719087592
- (with Claire Langhamer and Claudia Siebrecht) Total War: An Emotional History (British Academy/Oxford UNiversity Press, 2020) ISBN 9780197266663
- (With Sasha Handley and Rohan McWilliam) New Directions in Social and Cultural History (Bloomsbury, 2017) ISBN 9781472580818
- (With Juliette Pattinson) British Cultural Memory and the Second World War (Bloomsbury, 2013). ISBN 9781441104977
- Women in the British Army: War and the 'Gentle Sex', 1907–1948 (Routledge, 2008) ISBN 9780415390576
- War and the British: Gender and National Identity, 1939–1991 (I.B. Tauris, 1997). ISBN 9781860643064

Articles and book chapters

- 'The People's War in Concrete and Stone. Death and the negotiation of Collective Identity in Second World War Britain', English Historical Review, Vol. CXXXVIII (2024).
- (with Maggie Andrews, Alison Fell and June Purvis) "Representing, Remembering and Rewriting Women's Histories of the First World War", Women's History Review (2017).
- "'My Husband is Interested in War Generally': gender, family history and the emotional legacies of total war", Women's History Review (2017).
- "A broken silence? Mass Observation, Armistice Day and 'everyday life' in Britain 1937–1941", Journal of European Studies, vol. 45, no. 4 (2015).
- "Gender, Grief, and Bereavement in Second World War Britain", Journal of War and Culture Studies, vol. 8, no. 1 (2015).
- (with Juliette Pattinson and Wendy Ugolini), "Incarcerated Masculinities: Male POWs and the Second World War", Journal of War and Culture Studies, vol. 7, no. 3 (2014).
- "'War on the Web': The BBC 'People's War' Website and Memories of the Second World War in 21st century Britain", in Lucy Noakes and Juliette Pattinson, British Cultural Memory and the Second World War (2013). ISBN 9781441160577
- "Defending the home(land): gendering Civil Defence from the First World War to the 'War on Terror'. Gender and Conflict since 1914", in Ana Carden-Coyne (ed.), Historical and Interdisciplinary Perspectives. Gender and Conflict since 1914 (2012), pp. 53–70. ISBN 9780230280946
- "'Serve to Save': Gender, Citizenship and Civil Defence in Britain 1937–41", Journal of Contemporary History, vol. 47, no. 4 (2012).
- "From War Service to Domestic Service: Ex-Servicewomen and the Free Passage Scheme 1919-22", Twentieth Century British History, vol. 22, no. 1 (2011).
- "Demobilising the Military Woman: Constructions of Class and Gender in Britain after the First World War", Gender and History, vol. 19, no. 1 (2007).
- "Eve in Khaki: Women Working with the British Military 1915–1918", in Louise Jackson (ed.), Women and Work Culture: Britain c. 1850–1950 (2005), pp. 213–228. ISBN 978-0754650508

Academic offices
Preceded by Emma Griffin	President of the Royal Historical Society; 2024–present	Succeeded by Incumbent
