= Claire Langhamer =

British historian (born 1969)

Claire Louise Langhamer, FRHistS (born 1969), is a social and cultural historian of modern Britain. Since 2021, she has been director of the Institute of Historical Research.

== Career ==
After growing up in North Humberside, she attended the University of Manchester, graduating with a history degree in 1991. She subsequently completed her doctorate under the supervision of Dave Russell at the University of Central Lancashire; she was awarded her PhD in 1996 for her thesis Women and leisure in Manchester, 1920–c.1960. In 1998, Langhamer started working as an academic at the University of Sussex as a lecturer; she was promoted to a senior lectureship in 2004 and was appointed Professor of Modern British History in 2014. She left Sussex in 2021 to be director of the Institute of Historical Research. In 2017 she was elected a Fellow of the Royal Historical Society (FRHistS).

Langhamer's work has focused on the history of emotion, love, leisure and work in twentieth-century Britain, often in relation to the experiences of women. Alongside more than a dozen articles in peer-reviewed journals, Langhamer has published two single authored books, Women's Leisure in England, 1920–1960 (Manchester University Press, 2000) and The English in Love: The Intimate Story of an Emotional Revolution (Oxford University Press, 2013).

On 1 October 2021, Langhamer became director of the Institute of Historical Research of the University of London.

== Bibliography ==
Books

- Langhamer, Claire (2000). Women's Leisure in England, 1920–1960. Studies in Popular Culture. Manchester: Manchester University Press. ISBN 9780719057373.
- Langhamer, Claire (2013). The English in Love: The Intimate Story of an Emotional Revolution. Oxford: Oxford University Press. ISBN 9780199594436.
- Tinkler, Penny; Spencer, Stephanie; Langhamer, Claire, eds. (2017). Women in Fifties Britain: A New Look. Abingdon: Routledge. ISBN 978-0367234317.
- Noakes, Lucy; Langhamer, Claire; Siebrecht, Claudia, eds. (2020). Total War: An Emotional History. Proceedings of the British Academy. Vol. 227. Oxford: Oxford University Press. doi:10.5871/bacad/9780197266663.001.0001. ISBN 9780197266663.
- Barron, Hester; Langhamer, Claire (2021). Class of '37: Voices from Working-Class Girlhood. London: Metro Publishing. ISBN 978-1-78946-405-4.

Thesis

- Langhamer, Claire Louise (1996). Women and Leisure in Manchester, 1920–c.1960 (PhD). University of Central Lancashire.

Peer-reviewed articles and chapters

- Langhamer, Claire (1995). "Women's Leisure in the Life Cycle: An Oral History Study of Manchester Women, 1920–1960". Women's History Notebooks. 2 (2): 3–14.
- Langhamer, Claire (1999). "Manchester Women and Their Leisure: Changing Experiences from Youth to Married Adulthood, 1920–1960". Manchester Region History Review. 12: 32–42.
- Langhamer, Claire (2001). "Towards a Feminist Framework for the History of Women's Leisure, c. 1920–1960". In Gallagher, Anne-Marie; Labelska, Cathy; Ryan, Louise (eds.). Re-Presenting the Past: Women and History. Harlow: Longman. pp. 198–215. doi:10.4324/9781315838670-19. ISBN 9780582382190.
- Langhamer, Claire (2003). "'A Public House is for All Classes, Men and Women Alike': Women, Leisure and Drink in Second World War England". Women's History Review. 12 (3): 423–443. doi:10.1080/09612020300200367. S2CID 145001240.
- Langhamer, Claire (2004). "Leisure, Pleasure and Courtship: Young Women in England, c. 1920–1960". In Maynes, Mary Jo; Søland, Birgitte; Benninghaus, Christina (eds.). Secret Gardens, Satanic Mills: Placing Girls in European History, 1750–1960. Indianapolis, Ind.: Indiana University Press. pp. 269–284. ISBN 9780253217103.
- Langhamer, Claire (2005). "The Meanings of Home in Postwar Britain". Journal of Contemporary History. 40 (2): 341–362. doi:10.1177/0022009405051556. JSTOR 30036327. S2CID 145429727.
- Langhamer, Claire (2006). "Adultery in Post-War England". History Workshop Journal. 62 (1): 86–115. doi:10.1093/hwj/dbl004.
- Langhamer, Claire (2007). "Love and Courtship in Mid-Twentieth-Century England". The Historical Journal. 50 (1): 173–196. doi:10.1017/S0018246X06005966. JSTOR 4140170. S2CID 2004106.
- Langhamer, Claire (2008). "Leisure: Comparative History and Practices". In Smith, Bonnie (ed.). The Oxford Encyclopedia of Women in World History. Vol. 3. Oxford: Oxford University Press. pp. 90–96. ISBN 9780195148909.
- Brooke, Stephen; Langhamer, Claire (2011). "Introduction: Voluntary Organizations, NGOs, and Twentieth-Century Political Culture". Twentieth Century British History. 22 (2): 216. doi:10.1093/tcbh/hwr004.
- Langhamer, Claire (2012). "'The Live Dynamic Whole of Feeling and Behaviour': Capital Punishment and the Politics of Emotion, 1945–1957". Journal of British Studies. 51 (2): 416–441. doi:10.1086/663841. JSTOR 23265482. S2CID 146131599.
- Langhamer, Claire (2012). "Love, Selfhood and Authenticity in Post-War Britain". Cultural and Social History. 9 (2): 277–297. doi:10.2752/147800412X13270753068966. S2CID 144322174.
- Gazeley, Ian; Langhamer, Claire (2013). "The Meanings of Happiness in Mass Observation's Bolton". History Workshop Journal. 75 (1): 159–189. doi:10.1093/hwj/dbs015.
- Langhamer, Claire (2013). "Everyday Advice on Everyday Love: Romantic Expertise in Mid-Twentieth-Century Britain" (PDF). L'Homme: Zeitschrift für Feministische Geschichtswissenschaf. 24 (1): 35–52. doi:10.25595/1125.
- Langhamer, Claire (2016), "An Archive of Feeling?: Mass Observation and the Mid-Century Moment" (PDF), Insights, 9: 1–15
- Langhamer, Claire (2016). "Amours, Seductions et Désir". In Corbin, Alain (ed.). Histoire des Emotions. Vol. 3: De la Fin du XIXe Siècle à Nos Jours. Paris: Éditions du Seuill. pp. 382–400. ISBN 9782021177374.
- Barron, Hester; Langhamer, Claire (2017). "Feeling through Practice: Subjectivity and Emotion in Children's Writing". Journal of Social History. 51 (1): 101–123. doi:10.1093/jsh/shw070.
- Tinkler, Penny; Spencer, Stephanie; Langhamer, Claire (2017). "Revisioning the History of Girls and Women in Britain in the Long 1950s". Women's History Review. 26 (1): 1–8. doi:10.1080/09612025.2015.1123020. S2CID 146837578.
- Langhamer, Claire (2017). "Feelings, Women and Work in the Long 1950s". Women's History Review. 26 (1): 77–92. doi:10.1080/09612025.2015.1123025. S2CID 147331361.
- Barron, Hester; Langhamer, Claire (2017). "Children, Class and the Search for Security: Writing the Future in 1930s Britain". Twentieth Century British History. 28 (3): 367–389. doi:10.1093/tcbh/hwx018. PMID 28922817.
- Langhamer, Claire (2018). "'Who the Hell Are Ordinary People'?: Ordinariness as a Category of Historical Analysis". Transactions of the Royal Historical Society. 28: 175–195. doi:10.1017/S0080440118000099. S2CID 149600424.
- Langhamer, Claire (2019). "Alun and Sussex". History Workshop Journal. 88: 325–326. doi:10.1093/hwj/dbz040.
- Langhamer, Claire (2019). "Trust, Authenticity and Bigamy in Twentieth-Century England". In Barclay, Katie; Meek, Jeffrey; Thomson, Andrea (eds.). Courtship, Marriage and Marriage Breakdown: Approaches from the History of Emotion. New York, NY: Routledge. pp. 160–174. doi:10.4324/9780367824228-11. ISBN 9780367824228. S2CID 226902149.
- Langhamer, Claire (2019). "Mass Observing the Atom Bomb: The Emotional Politics of August 1945". Contemporary British History. 33 (2): 208–225. doi:10.1080/13619462.2018.1519422. S2CID 149201560.
- Vinen, Richard; Langhamer, Claire; Siena, Kevin (2020). "Writing Histories of 2020: First Responses and Early Perspectives". Historical Research. 93 (262): 786–806. doi:10.1093/hisres/htaa029. PMC 7717259.
- Noakes, Lucy; Langhamer, Claire; Siebrecht, Claudia (2020). "Introduction". In Noakes, Lucy; Langhamer, Claire; Siebrecht, Claudia (eds.). Total War: An Emotional History. Proceedings of the British Academy. Vol. 227. Oxford: Oxford University Press. pp. 1–20. doi:10.5871/bacad/9780197266663.003.0001. ISBN 9780197266663.
- Langhamer, Claire (2020). "'Astray in a Dark Forest?': The Emotional Politics of Reconstruction Britain". In Noakes, Lucy; Langhamer, Claire; Siebrecht, Claudia (eds.). Total War: An Emotional History. Proceedings of the British Academy. Vol. 227. Oxford: Oxford University Press. pp. 227–288. doi:10.5871/bacad/9780197266663.003.0008. ISBN 9780197266663. S2CID 226120002.

== Reviews of published works ==
The English in Love (2013)

- Sally Holloway for Reviews in History (Institute of Historical Research, January 2014).
- Alexander Harris for The Guardian, 9 August 2013.
- The Economist, 17 August 2013 (vol. 408, no. 8849, p. 70).
- Karen Shook and Hilary Hinds for The Times Higher Education Supplement, 8 August 2015 (no. 2113, p. 44).
- Richard Davenport-Hines for New Statesman, 16 August 2013 (vol. 142, no. 5171, p. 38).
- Adrian Bingham for Contemporary British History, vol. 29, no. 2 (2015), pp. 284–285.
- Susan J. Matt for Journal of Interdisciplinary History, vol. 45, no. 2 (2014), pp. 227–229.
- Susan Quilliam for Journal of Family Planning and Reproductive Health Care, vol. 40 (2014), p. 149.

Women's Leisure in England, 1920–1960 (2000)

- Grace Lees-Maffei for Journal of Design History, vol. 14, no. 2 (2001), pp. 162–164.
- Sean O'Connell for Journal of Contemporary History, vol. 37, no. 4 (2002), pp. 675–683.

Preceded by Professor Jo Fox	Director, Institute of Historical Research; 2020–present	Succeeded by incumbent
