= Jose Harris =

British historian (1941–2023)

Jose Ferial Harris, FBA, FRHistS (née Chambers; 23 January 1941 – 13 September 2023) was a British historian and academic. She was Professor of Modern History at the University of Oxford from 1996 to 2008, and a fellow and tutor at St Catherine's College, Oxford, from 1978 to 1997.

== Early life and education ==
Born Jose Ferial Chambers in 1941 at Bedford, she attended the Dame Alice Harpur School in Bedford before going up to Newnham College, Cambridge in 1959. She placed in the first class of both parts of the Historical Tripos, graduating in 1962 with a Bachelor of Arts degree (proceeding by convention to Master of Arts in 1966). She won the Helen Gladstone Scholarship (1962), Dr Ethel Williams Prize (1962) and the Gamble Studentship (1963) and went on to complete a doctorate at Cambridge, under the supervision of Professor Richard Titmuss of the London School of Economics; her PhD was awarded in 1970.

== Career ==
Between 1964 and 1966 Chambers was a lecturer in history at University College London. She was elected to a research fellowship at Nuffield College, Oxford, in 1966. In 1969, she left Oxford and was appointed to a lectureship in the Department of Social Administration at the London School of Economics. Promotion to senior lecturer followed in 1974. In 1978, she was elected to a fellowship at St Catherine's College, Oxford, where she was also a college tutor. She was appointed Reader in Modern History at the University of Oxford in 1990, and was promoted to Professor of Modern History in 1996. She relinquished her tutorial fellowship and became a professorial fellow of St Catherine's in 1997. She retired from her professorship in 2008 and was made an emeritus professor at the university; she was also an emeritus fellow at St Catherine's (where she had been the vice-master from 2003 to 2005).

== Personal life and death ==
In 1968, she married James Harris, a legal scholar. Together they had one son. Her husband predeceased her in 2004.

Harris died in her sleep on 13 September 2023, at the age of 82.

== Honours ==
According to the historian Lawrence Goldman, Harris was "the foremost historian of the welfare state in Britain and the biographer of its architect, William Beveridge ... Many historians have written about the social institutions that formed the welfare state; many have written biographies of key contributors to public welfare. But very few have understood and explained the intellectual history of modern social policy, and none did it so fluently and with such a sure grasp of modern philosophy".

Harris was elected a Fellow of the British Academy in 1993. As of 2021, she was also a Fellow of the Royal Historical Society. She gave the Ford Lectures at the University of Oxford in 1996–1997 on "A Land of Lost Content? Visions of Civic Virtue from Ruskin to Rawls". She was the subject of a festschrift, Lawrence Goldman (ed.), Welfare and Social Policy in Britain Since 1870 (Oxford: Oxford University Press, 2019).

== Bibliography ==
Books

- Harris, Jose (1972). Unemployment and Politics: A Study in English Social Policy, 1886–1914. Oxford: Clarendon Press. ISBN 9780198223559.
- Harris, Jose (1977). William Beveridge: A Biography (1st ed.). Oxford: Clarendon Press. ISBN 9780198224594.
- Harris, Jose (1984). Beatrice Webb: The Ambivalent Feminist. London: London School of Economics. ISBN 9780853280903.
- Harris, Jose (1993). Private Lives, Public Spirit: Britain, 1870–1914. Penguin History of Britain Series. London: Penguin Books. ISBN 9780140125481.
- Harris, Jose (1997). William Beveridge: A Biography (2nd ed.). Oxford: Oxford University Press. doi:10.1093/acprof:oso/9780198206859.001.0001. ISBN 9780198206859.
- Tönnies, Ferdinand (2001). Jose, Harris (ed.). Community and Civil Society. Cambridge Texts in the History of Political Thought. Translated by Harris, Jose; Hollis, Margaret. Cambridge: Cambridge University Press. doi:10.1017/CBO9780511816260. ISBN 9780521561198.
- Harris, Jose, ed. (2003). Civil Society in British History: Ideas, Identities and Institutions. Oxford: Oxford University Press. doi:10.1093/acprof:oso/9780199260201.001.0001. ISBN 9780199260201.
- Beveridge, William (2012). Harris, Jose (ed.). Le Rapport Beveridge: Le Texte Fondateur de l'État Providence. Translated by Bessières, Michel. Paris: Perrin. ISBN 9782262035181.

Peer reviewed articles and chapters

- Harris, Jose; Hazlehurst, Cameron (1970). "Campbell-Bannerman as Prime Minister". History. 55 (185): 360–383. doi:10.1111/j.1468-229X.1970.tb02485.x. JSTOR 24407608.
- Harris, Jose (1970). "Local Authority Social Services Act 1970". The Modern Law Review. 33 (5): 530–534. doi:10.1111/j.1468-2230.1970.tb01296.x. JSTOR 1093915.
- Harris, Jose (1975). "Social Planning in War-Time: Some Aspects of the Beveridge Report". In Winter, J. M. (ed.). War and Economic Development: Essays in Memory of David Joslin. Cambridge: Cambridge University Press. pp. 239–256. ISBN 9780521205351.
- Harris, Jose (1975). "The Social Thought of William Beveridge". Bulletin of the Society for the Study of Labour History. 31: 8–10. doi:10.3828/lhr.31.1.6.
- Harris, Jose (1981). "Some Aspects of Social Policy in Britain during the Second World War". In Mommsen, W. J. (ed.). The Emergence of the Welfare State in Britain and Germany 1850–1950: Readings in Philosophy and Social Policy. London: Croom Helm. pp. 247–262. doi:10.4324/9780429461095. ISBN 9780429461095. S2CID 153869843.
- Harris, Jose (1982). "Bureaucrats and Businessmen in British Food Control, 1916–19". In Burk, Kathleen (ed.). War and the State: The Transformation of British Government, 1914–1919. London: George Allen and Unwin. pp. 135–156. ISBN 9781317700333.
- Harris, Jose (1983). "Did British Workers Want the Welfare State? G. D. H. Cole's Survey of 1942". In Winter, J. M. (ed.). The Working Class in Modern British History: Essays in Honour of Henry Pelling. Cambridge: Cambridge University Press. pp. 200–214. doi:10.1017/CBO9780511896569.012. ISBN 9780521234443.
- Harris, Jose (1983). "The Transition to High Politics in English Social Policy, 1880–1914". In Bentley, Michael; Stevenson, John (eds.). High and Low Politics in Modern Britain. Oxford: Clarendon Press. pp. 58–79. ISBN 9780198226529.
- Harris, Jose; Thane, Pat (1984). "British and European Bankers 1880–1914: An 'Aristocratic Bourgeoisie'?". In Thane, Pat; Crossick, Geoffrey; Floud, Roderick (eds.). The Power of the Past: Essays for Eric Hobsbawm. Cambridge: Cambridge University Press. pp. 215–234. ISBN 9780521255257.
- Harris, Jose (1984). "The Webbs". In Barker, Paul (ed.). Founders of the Welfare State. London: Heinemann. pp. 52–60. ISBN 9780566052958.
- Harris, Jose (1986). "Political Ideas and the Debate on State Welfare, 1940–45". In Smith, Harold L. (ed.). War and Social Change: British Society in the Second World War. Manchester: Manchester University Press. pp. 233–263. ISBN 9780719017773.
- Harris, Jose (1989). "The Webbs, the Charity Organisation Society and the Ratan Tata Foundation: Social Policy from the Perspective of 1912". In Bulmer, Martin; Lewis, Jane; Piachaud, David (eds.). The Goals of Social Policy. London: Unwin Hyman. pp. 27–63. ISBN 9780044451327.
- Harris, Jose (1990). "Enterprise and Welfare States: A Comparative Perspective". Transactions of the Royal Historical Society. 40: 175–195. doi:10.2307/3679167. JSTOR 3679167. S2CID 154879336.
- Harris, Jose (1990). "Society and the State in Twentieth-Century Britain". In Thompson, F. M. L. (ed.). The Cambridge Social History of Britain, 1750–1950. Vol. 3. Cambridge: Cambridge University Press. pp. 63–118. doi:10.1017/CHOL9780521257909.003. ISBN 9781139055604.
- Harris, Jose (1990). "Economic Knowledge and British Social Policy". In Furner, Mary O.; Supple, Barry (eds.). The State and Economic Knowledge: The American and British Experiences. Cambridge: Cambridge University Press. pp. 379–400. ISBN 9780521523158.
- Harris, Jose (1991). "Enterprise and the Welfare State: A Comparative Perspective". In Gourvish, Terry; O'Day, Alan (eds.). Britain since 1945. Problems in Focus. Basingstoke: Macmillan. pp. 39–58. doi:10.1007/978-1-349-21603-1. ISBN 9781349216031.
- Harris, Jose (1991). "Financial Elites and Society: Comments". In Cassis, Youssef (ed.). Finance and Financiers in European History 1880–1960. Cambridge: Cambridge University Press. pp. 187–190. doi:10.1017/CBO9780511599545.011. ISBN 9780511599545.
- Harris, Jose (1992). "Political Thought and the Welfare State 1870–1940: An Intellectual Framework for British Social Policy". Past and Present (135): 116–141. doi:10.1093/past/135.1.116. JSTOR 650972.
- Harris, Jose (1992). "War and Social History: Britain and the Home Front during the Second World War". Contemporary European History. 1 (1): 17–35. doi:10.1017/S096077730000504X. JSTOR 20081424. S2CID 162372308.
- Harris, Jose (1992). "Victorian Values and the Founders of the Welfare State" (PDF). Proceedings of the British Academy. 78: 165–182.
- Harris, Jose (1994). "Beveridge's Social and Political Thought". In Hills, John; Ditch, John; Glennerster, Howard (eds.). Beveridge and Social Security: An International Retrospective. Oxford: Oxford University Press. pp. 23–36. ISBN 9780198288060.
- Harris, Jose (1994). "Great Britain: The People's War?". In Reynolds, David; Kimball, Warren K.; Chubarian, A. O. (eds.). Allies of War: The Soviet, American and British Experience, 1939–1945. Franklin and Eleanor Roosevelt Institute Series on Diplomatic and Economic History. Vol. 7. New York, N.Y.: St Martin's Press. pp. 233–259. ISBN 9780312102593.
- Harris, Jose (1994). "The Arts and Social Sciences, 1939–1970". In Harrison, Brian (ed.). The History of the University of Oxford. Vol. 8: The Twentieth Century. Oxford: Oxford University Press. pp. 217–249. doi:10.1093/acprof:oso/9780198229742.001.0001. ISBN 9780198229742.
- Harris, Jose (1995). "Between Civic Virtue and Social Darwinism: The Concept of the Residuum". In Englander, David; O'Day, Rosemary (eds.). Retrieved Riches: Social Investigation in England, 1840–1914. Aldershot: Scolar Press. pp. 67–87. ISBN 9781859281185.
- Harris, Jose (1995). "Le Compromis de Beveridge: Contrat et Citoyenneté dans la Protection Sociale, 1934–1948". Revue Française de Science Politique. 45 (4): 596–609. doi:10.3406/rfsp.1995.403560. JSTOR 43119399.
- Harris, Jose (1996). "Political Thought and the State". In Green, S. J. D.; Whiting, R. C. (eds.). The Boundaries of the State in Modern Britain. Cambridge: Cambridge University Press. pp. 15–28. ISBN 9780521522229.
- Harris, Jose (1996). "From Sunspots to Social Welfare: The Unemployment Problem, 1870–1914". In Corry, Bernard (ed.). Unemployment and the Economists. Cheltenham: Edward Elgar. pp. 52–68. ISBN 9781858983516.
- Harris, Jose (1996). "'Contract' and 'Citizenship'". In Marquand, David; Seldon, Anthony (eds.). The Ideas That Shaped Post-War Britain. London: Fontana Press. pp. 122–138. ISBN 9780006384496.
- Harris, Jose (1996). "Platonism, Positivism and Progressivism: Aspects of British Sociological Thought in the Early Twentieth Century". In Biagini, Eugenio F. (ed.). Citizenship and Community: Liberals, Radicals and Collective Identities in the British Isles, 1865–1931. Cambridge: Cambridge University Press. pp. 343–360. doi:10.1017/CBO9780511522475.015. ISBN 9780511522475.
- Harris, Jose (1996). "Political Thought and Social Policy: The Public and Private Spheres". In Katz, Michael B.; Sachsse, Christoph (eds.). The Mixed Economy of Social Welfare: Public/Private Relations in England, Germany and the United States, the 1870s to the 1930s. Baden-Baden: Nomos Verlagsgesellschaft. pp. 49–69. ISBN 9783789043543.
- Harris, Jose (1996). "Contract and Citizenship in Social Welfare, 1934–1948". In Palier, B. (ed.). Comparing Social Welfare Systems in Europe. Vol. 1. Paris. pp. 149–164. ISBN 9782110890023.
- Harris, Jose (1997). "Social Policy, Saving and Sound Money: Budgeting for the New Jerusalem in the Second World War". In Clarke, Peter; Trebilcock, Clive (eds.). Understanding Decline: Perceptions and Realities of British Economic Performance. Cambridge: Cambridge University Press. pp. 166–185. ISBN 9780521563178.
- Harris, Jose (1999). "Beveridge and the Beveridge Report – Life, Ideas, Influence". In Walker, Robert (ed.). Ending Child Poverty: Popular Welfare for the 21st Century. Bristol: Policy Press. pp. 21–28. ISBN 9781861341990.
- Harris, Jose (1999). "Social Anthropology as Intellectual History: Stocking's Victorian Anthropology and After Tylor". Journal of Victorian Culture. 4 (2): 319–328. doi:10.1080/13555509909505997.
- Harris, Jose (1999). "Ruskin and Social Reform". In Birch, Dinah (ed.). Ruskin and the Dawn of the Modern. Oxford: Clarendon Press. pp. 7–34. ISBN 9780198184546.
- Harris, Jose (2000). "Labour's Political and Social Thought". In Tanner, Duncan; Thane, Pat; Tiratsoo, Nick (eds.). Labour's First Century. Cambridge: Cambridge University Press. pp. 8–45. ISBN 9780521651844.
- Harris, Jose (2001). "Thucydides amongst the Mandarins: Hancock and the World War II Civil Histories". In Low, D. A. (ed.). Keith Hancock: The Legacies of an Historian. Melbourne: Melbourne University Press. pp. 122–148. ISBN 9780522849387.
- Harris, Jose (2001). "If Britain Had Been Defeated by the Nazis, How Would History Have Been Written?". In Louis, William Roger (ed.). Still More Adventures with Britannia: Personalities, Politics and Culture in Britain. London: I. B. Taurus. pp. 211–228. ISBN 9781860649141.
- Harris, Jose (2001). "Beveridge, Titmuss, and Trends in Social Policy at the Start of the Twenty-First Century". Social Security. 59: 5–18. JSTOR 23274092.
- Harris, Jose (2002). "From Poor Law to Welfare State?: A European Perspective". In Winch, Donald; O'Brien, Patrick K. (eds.). The Political Economy of British Historical Experience, 1688–1914. Oxford: Oxford University Press for the British Academy. pp. 409–438. ISBN 9780197262726.
- Harris, Jose (2002). "Liberalism's Rapprochement with the Welfare State". Mélanges de l'École française de Rome. 114 (2): 761–773.
- Harris, Jose (2003). "Introduction: Civil Society in British History: Paradigm or Peculiarity?". In Harris, Jose (ed.). Civil Society in British History: Ideas, Identities, Institutions. Oxford: Oxford University Press. pp. 1–12. doi:10.1093/acprof:oso/9780199260201.003.0001. ISBN 9780199260201.
- Harris, Jose (2003). "From Richard Hooker to Harold Laski: Changing Perceptions of Civil Society in British Political Thought, Late Sixteenth to Early Twentieth Centuries". In Harris, Jose (ed.). Civil Society in British History: Ideas, Identities, Institutions. Oxford: Oxford University Press. pp. 13–38. doi:10.1093/acprof:oso/9780199260201.003.0002. ISBN 9780199260201.
- Harris, Jose (2003). "Tradition and Transformation: Society and Civil Society in Britain, 1945–2001". In Burk, Kathleen (ed.). The British Isles since 1945. Short Oxford History of the British Isles Series. Oxford: Oxford University Press. pp. 91–126. ISBN 9780198731801.
- Harris, Jose (2003). "William Beveridge in Whitehall: Maverick or Mandarin?". In MacLeod, Roy (ed.). Government and Expertise: Specialists, Administrators and Professionals, 1860–1919. Cambridge: Cambridge University Press. pp. 224–241. ISBN 9780521534505.
- Harris, Jose (2003). "War Socialism and Its Aftermath: Debates about a New Social and Economic Order in Britain, 1945–50". In Geppert, Dominik (ed.). The Postwar Challenge: Cultural, Social, and Political Change in Western Europe, 1945–1958. Studies of the German Historical Institute London. Oxford: Oxford University Press. pp. 179–186. ISBN 9780199266654.
- Harris, Jose (2004). "Tönnies on 'Community' and 'Civil Society': Clarifying Some Cross-Currents in Post-Marxian Political Thought". In Bevir, Mark; Trentmann, Frank (eds.). Markets in Historical Contexts: Ideas and Politics in the Modern World. Cambridge: Cambridge University Press. pp. 129–144. doi:10.1017/CBO9780511496677.007. ISBN 9780511496677.
- Harris, Jose (2004). "Nationality, Rights and Virtue: Some Approaches to Citizenship in Great Britain". In Bellamy, Richard; Castiglione, Dario; Santoro, Emilio (eds.). Lineages of European Citizenship: Rights, Belonging and Participation in Eleven Nation-States. Basingstoke: Palgrave Macmillan. pp. 73–91. doi:10.1057/9780230522442. ISBN 9780230522442.
- Harris, Jose (2006). "Development of Civil Society". In Rhodes, R. A. W.; Binder, Sarah A.; Rockman, Bert A. (eds.). The Oxford Handbook of Political Institutions. The Oxford Handbooks of Political Science. Oxford: Oxford University Press. pp. 131–143. ISBN 9780199275694.
- Harris, Jose (2006). "The Roots of Public Pensions Provision: Social Insurance and the Beveridge Plan". In Pemberton, Hugh; Thane, Pat; Whiteside, Noel (eds.). Britain's Pensions Crisis: History and Policy. British Academy Occasional Papers. Vol. 7. Oxford: Oxford University Press for the British Academy. pp. 27–38. doi:10.5871/bacad/9780197263853.001.0001. ISBN 9780197263853.
- Harris, Jose (2007). "Principles, Poor Laws and Welfare States". In Hills, John; Le Grand, Julian; Piachaud, David (eds.). Making Social Policy Work: Essays in Honour of Howard Glennerster. Bristol: Policy Press. pp. 13–34. ISBN 9781861349576.
- Harris, Jose (2008). "Introduction: Constitutions, Civility and Violence". Journal of Modern European History. 6 (1): 30–37. doi:10.17104/1611-8944_2008_1_30. S2CID 147215309.
- Harris, Jose (2009). "'Social Evils' and 'Social Problems' in Britain since 1904". In Utting, David (ed.). Contemporary Social Evils. Bristol: Policy Press. pp. 5–26. ISBN 9781847424099.
- Harris, Jose (2009). "The Webbs and Beveridge" (PDF). In Wallis, Ed (ed.). From the Workhouse to Welfare: What Beatrice Webb's 1909 Minority Report Can Teach Us Today. London: Fabian Society. pp. 55–64. ISBN 9780716341062.
- Harris, Jose (2010). "'A Struggle for European Civilization': T. S. Eliot and British Conceptions of Europe during and after the Second World War". In Conway, Martin; Patel, Kiran Klaus (eds.). Europeanization in the Twentieth Century: Historical Perspectives. The Palgrave Macmillan Transnational History Series. London: Palgrave Macmillan. pp. 44–63. doi:10.1057/9780230293120_3. ISBN 9780230293120.
- Harris, Jose (2010). "The Liberal Empire and British Social Policy: Citizens, Colonials and Indigenous Peoples, circa 1880–1914". Histoire@Politique. 11 (2): 3. doi:10.3917/hp.011.0003.
- Harris, Jose (2011). "Voluntarism, the State and Public–Private Partnerships in Beveridge's Social Thought". In Oppenheimer, Melanie; Deakin, Nicholas (eds.). Beveridge and Voluntary Action in Britain and the Wider British World. Manchester: Manchester University Press. pp. 9–20. ISBN 9780719083815.
- Harris, Jose (2011). "Servile State or Discredited State? Some Historical Antecedents of Current 'Big Society' Debates". The Political Quarterly. 82 (1): 55–67. doi:10.1111/j.1467-923X.2011.02327.x.
- Harris, Jose (2011). "Epilogue: French Revolution to 'Fin de Siecle': Political Thought in Retrospect and Prospect, 1800–1914". In Claeys, Gregory; Stedman Jones, Gareth (eds.). The Cambridge History of Nineteenth-Century Political Thought. Cambridge: Cambridge University Press. pp. 893–933. ISBN 9780674244801.
- Harris, Jose (2012). "'Big Society' and 'Great Society': A Problem in the History of Ideas". In Ishkanian, Armine; Szreter, Simon (eds.). The Big Society Debate: A New Agenda for Social Welfare?. Cheltenham: Edward Elgar. pp. 27–38. doi:10.4337/9781781002087. ISBN 9781781002087.
- Harris, Jose (2017). "Principles, Markets and National Interest in Conservative Approaches to Social Policy". In Berthezène, Clarisse; Vinel, Jean-Christian (eds.). Postwar Conservatism, A Transnational Investigation: Britain, France and the United States, 1930–1990. Cham: Palgrave Macmillan. pp. 95–118. doi:10.1007/978-3-319-40271-0. ISBN 9783319402710.

Encyclopedia articles

- Harris (reviser), Jose (2004). "Bosanquet [née Dendy], Helen (1860–1925)". Oxford Dictionary of National Biography. Oxford Dictionary of National Biography (revised ed.). online ed.: Oxford University Press. doi:10.1093/ref:odnb/37208. ISBN 978-0-19-861412-8. (Subscription, Wikipedia Library access or UK public library membership required.)
- Harris, Jose (2006) [2004]. "Swanwick [née Sickert], Helena Maria Lucy (1864–1939)". Oxford Dictionary of National Biography. Oxford Dictionary of National Biography (revised ed.). online ed.: Oxford University Press. doi:10.1093/ref:odnb/38040. ISBN 978-0-19-861412-8. (Subscription, Wikipedia Library access or UK public library membership required.)
- Harris, Jose (2008) [2004]. "Booth, Charles (1840–1916)". Oxford Dictionary of National Biography. Oxford Dictionary of National Biography (revised ed.). online ed.: Oxford University Press. doi:10.1093/ref:odnb/31966. ISBN 978-0-19-861412-8. (Subscription, Wikipedia Library access or UK public library membership required.)
- Harris, Jose (2010) [2004]. "Spencer, Herbert (1820–1903)". Oxford Dictionary of National Biography. Oxford Dictionary of National Biography (revised ed.). online ed.: Oxford University Press. doi:10.1093/ref:odnb/36208. ISBN 978-0-19-861412-8. (Subscription, Wikipedia Library access or UK public library membership required.)
- Harris, Jose (2011) [2004]. "Beveridge, William Henry, Baron Beveridge (1879–1963)". Oxford Dictionary of National Biography. Oxford Dictionary of National Biography (revised ed.). online ed.: Oxford University Press. doi:10.1093/ref:odnb/31871. ISBN 978-0-19-861412-8. (Subscription, Wikipedia Library access or UK public library membership required.)
- Harris, Jose (2011) [2004]. "Wedgwood, (Frances) Julia (1833–1913)". Oxford Dictionary of National Biography. Oxford Dictionary of National Biography (revised ed.). online ed.: Oxford University Press. doi:10.1093/ref:odnb/52808. ISBN 978-0-19-861412-8. (Subscription, Wikipedia Library access or UK public library membership required.)
- Harris (reviser), Jose (2011) [2004]. "Lytton, Lady Constance Georgina Bulwer- (1869–1923)". Oxford Dictionary of National Biography. Oxford Dictionary of National Biography (revised ed.). online ed.: Oxford University Press. doi:10.1093/ref:odnb/37705. ISBN 978-0-19-861412-8. (Subscription, Wikipedia Library access or UK public library membership required.)
- Beveridge, William; Harris (reviser), Jose (2011) [2004]. "Stamp, Josiah Charles, first Baron Stamp (1880–1941)". Oxford Dictionary of National Biography. Oxford Dictionary of National Biography (revised ed.). online ed.: Oxford University Press. doi:10.1093/ref:odnb/36237. ISBN 978-0-19-861412-8. (Subscription, Wikipedia Library access or UK public library membership required.)
- Harris, Jose (2012) [2004]. "Mill, John Stuart (1806–1873)". Oxford Dictionary of National Biography. Oxford Dictionary of National Biography (revised ed.). online ed.: Oxford University Press. doi:10.1093/ref:odnb/18711. ISBN 978-0-19-861412-8. (Subscription, Wikipedia Library access or UK public library membership required.)
