= Gift from the German Government to the University of London 1937 =

Historical event

Among the Institute of Historical Research’s extensive collection of books on European history are a set of volumes of the Monumenta Germaniae Historica and other works donated to the University of London by the Nazi government of Germany in 1937. The presentation was made by Joachim von Ribbentrop, Germany’s ambassador to Britain.

James Bavington Jeffreys, a student at the LSE at the time, wrote an account of the attempt by University of London students to block the donation. Jeffreys attempted to rally support against the donation from the History teaching staff at the LSE. Among the staff he spoke to were Sir Charles Webster and Richard Tawney, but he was unable to raise any support amongst the academics against the donation. Eventually it was left to the students themselves to make a stand. Around fifty students gathered outside Senate House, and demonstrated as Ribbentrop arrived to make the donation. Jeffreys noted: "…more than one college of the University was represented, to show it was not just the 'left-wingers' of the LSE".
