= Lawrence Goldman =

English historian and academic

Lawrence Goldman FRHistS
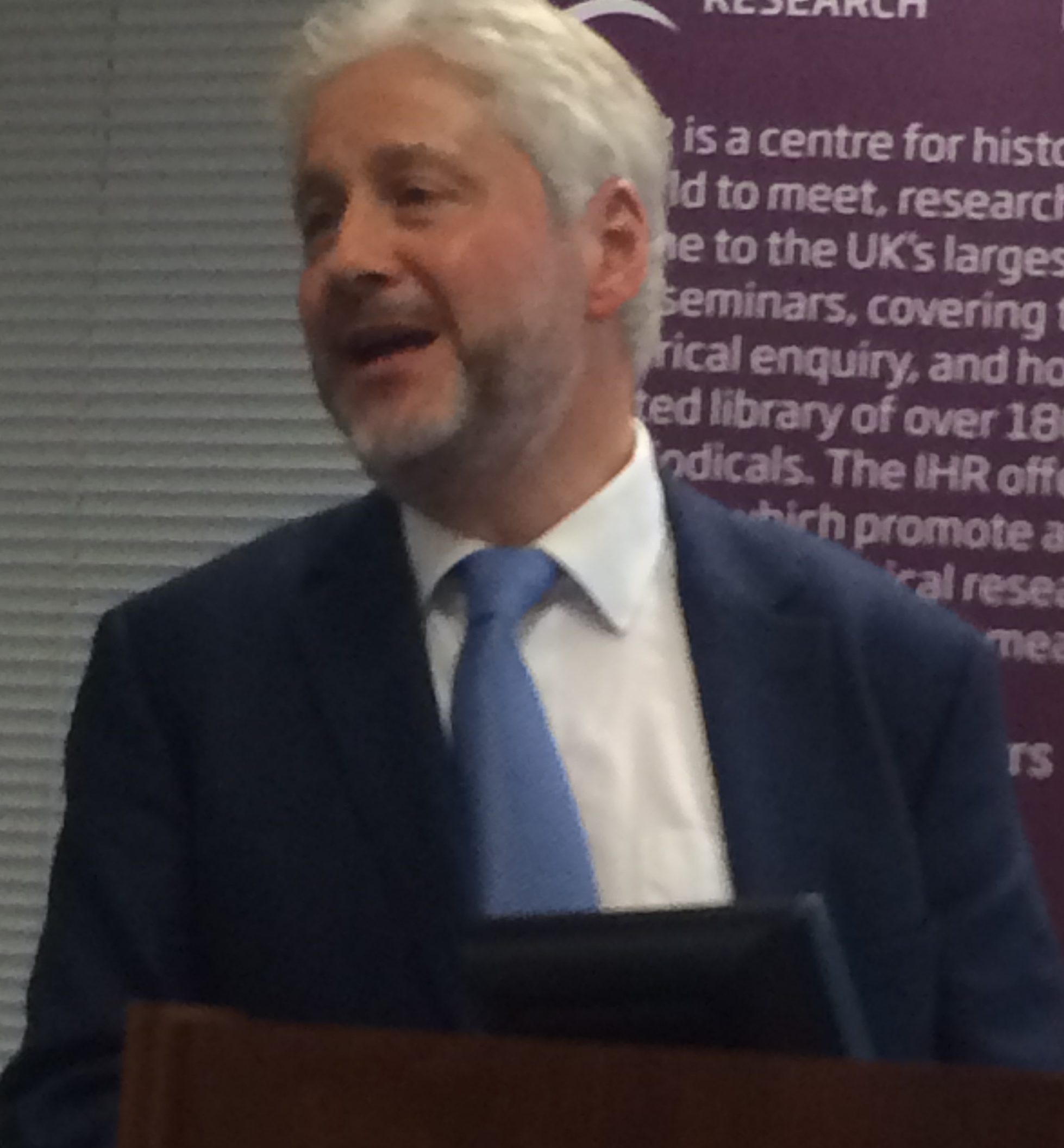
- Goldman at the IHR London, February 2016
- Born: 17 June 1957 (age 69); London, England
- Education: Jesus College, Cambridge; Yale University
- Occupation: Historian

Lawrence Goldman FRHistS (born 17 June 1957) is an English historian and academic, who is an emeritus fellow of St Peter's College, Oxford. He is the former director the Oxford Dictionary of National Biography (2004 to 2014) and of the Institute of Historical Research (2014 to 2017), University of London. He has a PhD from the University of Cambridge.

== Biography ==
Born in London, he read history at Jesus College, Cambridge (1976–79), as an undergraduate. Upon graduation he received a Harkness Fellowship, which enabled him to study history of slavery and American Civil War at Yale University for a year with Ed Morgan, David Montgomery and David Brion Davis. He returned to Cambridge to undertake research in Victorian social science and social policy, and in 1982 he was elected a junior research fellow at Trinity College. In 1985, he moved to Oxford as university lecturer in the Department for Continuing Education. He continues to teach regular adult classes and is president of the Thames and Solent district of the Workers' Educational Association. In 1990, he was appointed to a Fellowship at St Peter's College, where he has also served as admissions tutor and senior dean.

During the academic year 2000–01, he was the university assessor, a senior administrator responsible for student welfare. He has served as chairman of examiners for the Final Honour School of Modern History.

On 1 October 2004, Goldman was appointed editor of the Oxford Dictionary of National Biography, published by Oxford University Press, succeeding Brian Harrison. The appointment was for ten years.

Goldman was the director of the University of London's Institute of Historical Research from 2014 to 2017. He is a member of the History Reclaimed group, that seeks to counter the ideological rewriting history and 'to challenge distortions of history, and to provide context, explanation and balance in a debate in which dogmatism is too often preferred to analysis, and condemnation to understanding'. He is executive editor for the project.

He has contributed to numerous episodes of In Our Time on BBC Radio 4.

== Selected bibliography ==
=== Author ===
- Goldman, Lawrence (1995). Dons and Workers: Oxford and Adult Education Since 1850. Oxford: Clarendon Press. doi:10.1093/acprof:oso/9780198205753.001.0001. ISBN 978-0198205753.
- "Exceptionalism and Internationalism: The Origins of American Social Science Reconsidered", The Journal of Historical Sociology Vol. 11, 1 (1998) pp. 1–36
- Goldman, Lawrence (2000). "Intellectuals and the English Working Class 1870–1945: The case of adult education". History of Education. 29 (4): 281–300. doi:10.1080/00467600050044662. S2CID 144749564.
- "Education as Politics: University Adult Education in England since 1870", Oxford Review of Education Vol. 25, nos. 1&2 (1999) pp. 89–101
- "Republicanism, Radicalism and Sectionalism: Land Reform and the Languages of American Working Men 1820–1860", in Articulating America: Fashioning a National Political Culture in Early America, 1750–1850, ed. Rebecca Starr (Lanham, Maryland: Rowman & Littlefield, 2001) pp. 177–233
- Science, Reform and Politics in Victorian Britain: The Social Science Association 1857-1886 (CUP, 2002)
- "Civil Society in Nineteenth-century Britain and Germany: J. M. Ludlow, Lujo Brentano and the Labour Question", in Civil Society in British History: Ideas, Identities, Institutions, ed. Jose Harris (Oxford: Oxford University Press, 2003) pp. 97–113
- From art to politics: John Ruskin and William Morris (London: William Morris Society, 2005)

=== Editor ===
- The blind Victorian: Henry Fawcett and British liberalism (Cambridge: Cambridge University Press, 1989)
- (With Peter Ghosh) Politics and culture in Victorian Britain: essays in memory of Colin Matthew (Oxford: Oxford University Press, 2006)

=== Articles in Oxford Dictionary of National Biography ===
- Sir Walter Frederick Crofton (1815–1897)
- Queen Elizabeth the Queen Mother (1900–2002)
- Henry Fawcett (1833–1884)
- George Woodyatt Hastings (1825–1917)
- Sir John Arthur Ransome Marriott (1859–1945)
- Richard Henry Tawney, (1880–1962)

Preceded by Professor Brian Harrison	Editor, Oxford Dictionary of National Biography; 2004–2014	Succeeded by Sir David Cannadine
Preceded by Professor Miles Taylor	Director, Institute of Historical Research; 2014–2017	Succeeded by Professor Jo Fox
