= James Harris (solicitor) =

British solicitor, academic and professor of law

James W. Harris FBA (1940–2004) was a British solicitor, academic and professor of law at Keble College, University of Oxford.

He was born in Southwark, England and he became blind at the age of four. Harris attended the Linton Lodge School and Royal Worcester College until 1959 when he began studying at Wadham College at Oxford. He was a brilliant student, and gifted in athletics including rowing and riding.

He became a solicitor and later returned to Oxford for a Bachelor of Civil Law. He taught at the London School of Economics where he pursued a PhD (subsequently published as Law and Legal Science). He became a Fellow at Keble College at Oxford in 1973, and has also taught in Sydney, Hong Kong and Princeton University. Harris was named as a Fellow of the British Academy and received the Oxford Doctorate of Civil Law.

He was married to Jose Harris, an Oxford historian, and had one son, Hugh who is now an Officer in the Royal Navy. Harris was a devout Anglican.

== Bibliography ==
- Variation of Trusts (Sweet & Maxwell, London, 1975)
- Law and Legal Science (Clarendon Press, Oxford, 1979)
- Legal Philosophies (Butterworths, London, 1980, 2nd edn., 1997)
- Cross and Harris: Precedent in English Law (4th edn., Clarendon Press, Oxford, 1991)
- Property and Justice (Clarendon Press, Oxford, 1996)
- (Edited) Property Problems: From Genes to Pension Funds (Kluwer Law International, London, 1997)

Harris also authored numerous journal articles.
