= Swasti Mitter =

Indian-British academic

Swasti Mitter (22 May 1939 – 1 May 2016) was a researcher into gender and development. She held posts as Professor of Gender and Technology at the University of Brighton, and as a deputy director of the UNU Institute of New Technologies at the University of Maastricht (Now UNU-MERIT). Her main area of research involved exploring the ways information technologies have influenced employment patterns for women in less developed countries.

== Life ==
Mitter was born in Baharampur, West Bengal, India on 22 May 1939. Her father, Sasankasekhar Sanyal was a politician and her mother Usha Rani. She was educated at Presidency College and Krishnath College. Against her parents' wishes, she married Partha Mitter in 1960, and they had two children together. They moved to the United Kingdom, where she studied at the London School of Economics and the University of Cambridge.

In the early 1970s, Mitter traveled to Sonarpur to research peasant uprisings, publishing a paper on the subject Peasant Movements in West Bengal in 1977. An academic post in 1974 at Brighton Polytechnic led to a professorial position at what had become the University of Brighton in 1993, in gender and technology. Whilst at Brighton, she published two books, Common Fate: Common Bond in 1986, about the poor working conditions of women in export processing zones, and Computer-aided Manufacturing and Women's Employment in 1992. From 1994 to 2000, Mitter was deputy director of INTECH.

On 1 May 2016, Mitter died of cancer and pneumonia at Churchill Hospital, Oxford.

== Selected publications ==
- Mitter, S. (1986). Common fate, common bond: Women in the global economy. London: Pluto.
- Mitter, S., & Rowbotham, S. (1995). Women encounter technology: Changing patterns of employment in the Third World. London: Routledge.
- Mitter, S., Pearson, R., Ng, C., & International Labour Organization. (1992). Global information processing: The emergence of software services and data entry jobs in selected developing countries. Geneva: ILO.
