= Institute of Historical Research =

British educational organization

- Founder: A. F. Pollard
- Established: 1921; 105 years ago
- Director: Claire Langhamer
- Members: 5,500 worldwide
- Owner: School of Advanced Study, University of London
- Location: Senate House, Malet Street, London, United Kingdom
- Coordinates: 51°31′16″N 0°7′43″W
- Interactive map of Institute of Historical Research
- Website: history.ac.uk

The Institute of Historical Research (IHR) is a British educational organisation providing resources and training for historical researchers. It is part of the School of Advanced Study in the University of London and is located at Senate House. The institute was founded in 1921 by A. F. Pollard.

== History ==
=== Foundation ===
The IHR was founded in 1921 by British historian Albert Pollard with the help of Eliza Jeffries Davis. Appointed professor of Constitutional History at University College London in 1903, his inaugural address, a year later, argued for the need for a postgraduate school of historical research. With a generous and anonymous donation of £20,000 from Sir John Cecil Power in 1920 towards the founding of the institute, Pollard's dream was realised. The institute was formally opened by H. A. L. Fisher on 8 July 1921.

The IHR was directly administered by the Senate of the University of London, rather than being part of one of the federal colleges. It was the first organisation to be administered under such an arrangement, and as such provided the model for other institutes, many of which later joined the IHR in the University of London's School of Advanced Study.

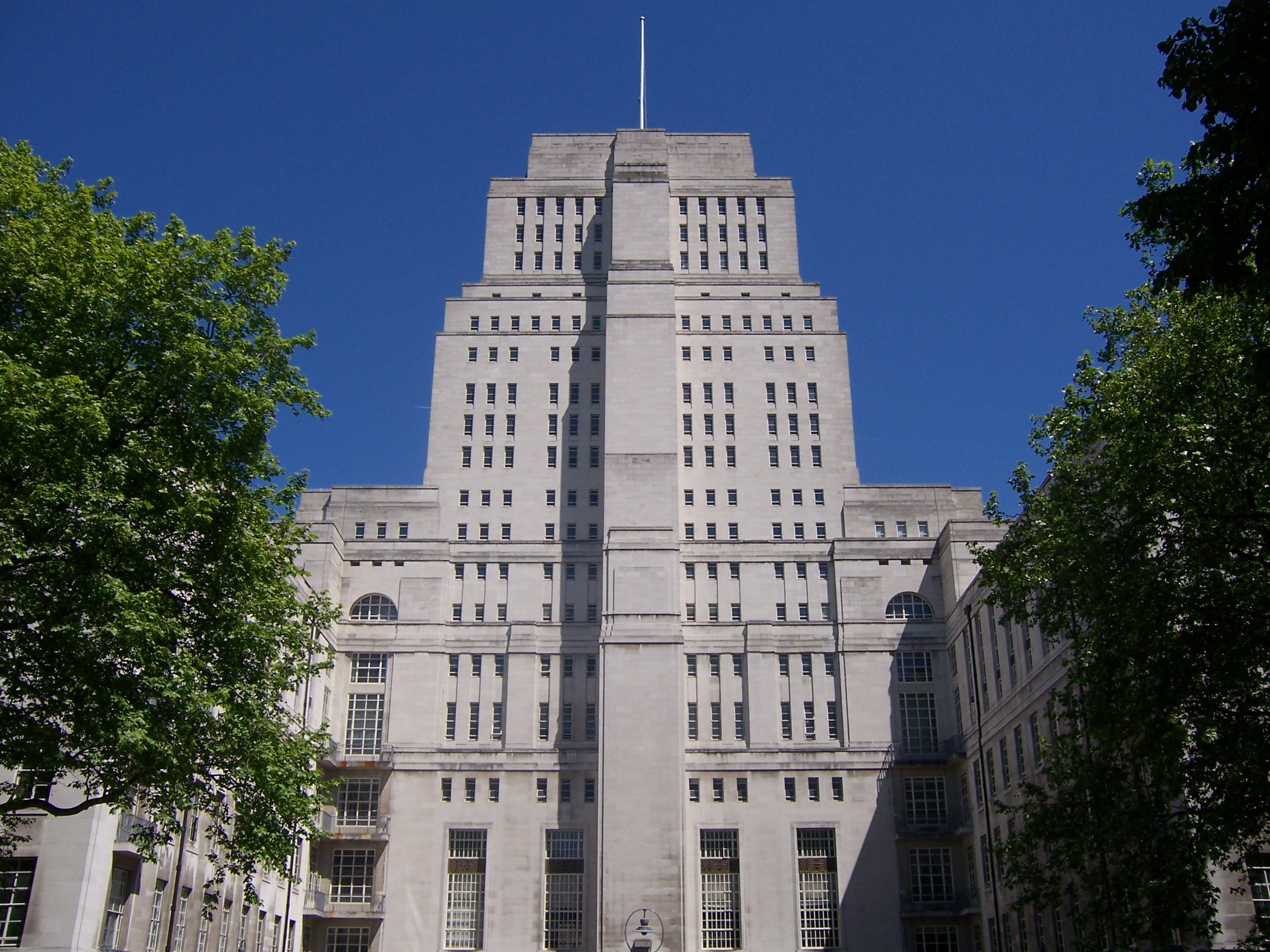
Senate House, home to the IHR since 1947

The IHR's first premises were in "temporary" huts on Malet Street, on a site now occupied by Birkbeck College. Despite the supposedly temporary nature of this accommodation, the IHR was not to move until 1947, when it took up residence in the north block of Senate House. The new location was built by architect Charles Holden, along with the rest of the university, at a projected cost of £3,000,000 and duration of 30 years for the whole project. Still occupying this position, many rooms in the IHR overlook the grass lawn in between Senate House and SOAS, which is where Senate House's unbuilt fourth court would have been.

With the start of World War II in September 1939, the institute's work and construction of its permanent building were disrupted, with the Ministry of Information occupying Senate House, and closing the institute in May 1940. The IHR was struck by a bomb on the night of 22–23 September 1940. The impact resulted in "the destruction of six books and almost the entire collection of London maps, as well as of furniture".

=== Directors ===
- 1921–39: Prof. Albert Frederick Pollard
- 1939–44: Sir Cyril Thomas Flower (acting director)
- 1944–48: Prof. V. H. Galbraith, FBA
- 1948–60: Prof. Sir John Goronwy Edwards, FBA, FSA
- 1960–67: Prof. Francis Wormald, CBE, FBA, FSA
- 1967–77: Prof. Arthur Geoffrey Dickens, CMG, FBA, FRHistS
- 1977–90: Prof. Francis Michael Longstreth Thompson, CBE, FBA
- 1990–98: Prof. Patrick Karl O'Brien, FBA
- 1998–2003: Prof. David Nicholas Cannadine, FSA, FRSA, FRSL, FRHistS
- 2003–08: Prof. David Richard Bates, FSA, FRHistS
- 2008–14: Prof. Miles Taylor, FRHistS
- 2014–17: Prof. Lawrence Neil Goldman, FRHistS
- 2018–20: Prof. Jo Fox, FRHistS, FRSA
- 2021– : Prof. Claire Langhamer, FRHistS

== Role ==
The IHR's role comprises the following:

To promote the study of history and an appreciation of the importance of the past among academics and the general public, in London, in Britain and internationally, and to provide institutional support and individual leadership for this broad historical community

To offer a wide range of services which promote and facilitate excellence in historical research, teaching and scholarship in the UK, by means of its library, seminars, conferences, fellowships, training and publications (both print and digital)

To further high quality research into particular aspects of the past by its research centres – the Centre for Metropolitan History and the Victoria County History of England

To provide a welcoming environment where historians at all stages in their careers and from all parts of the world can meet formally and informally to exchange ideas and information, and to bring themselves up to date with current developments in historical scholarship

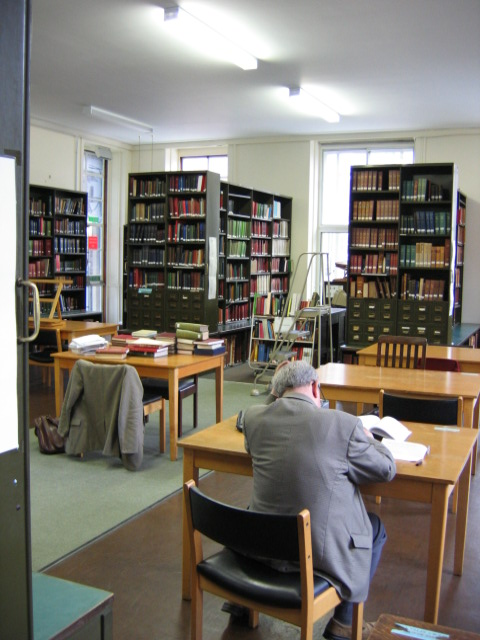
A room in the IHR Library

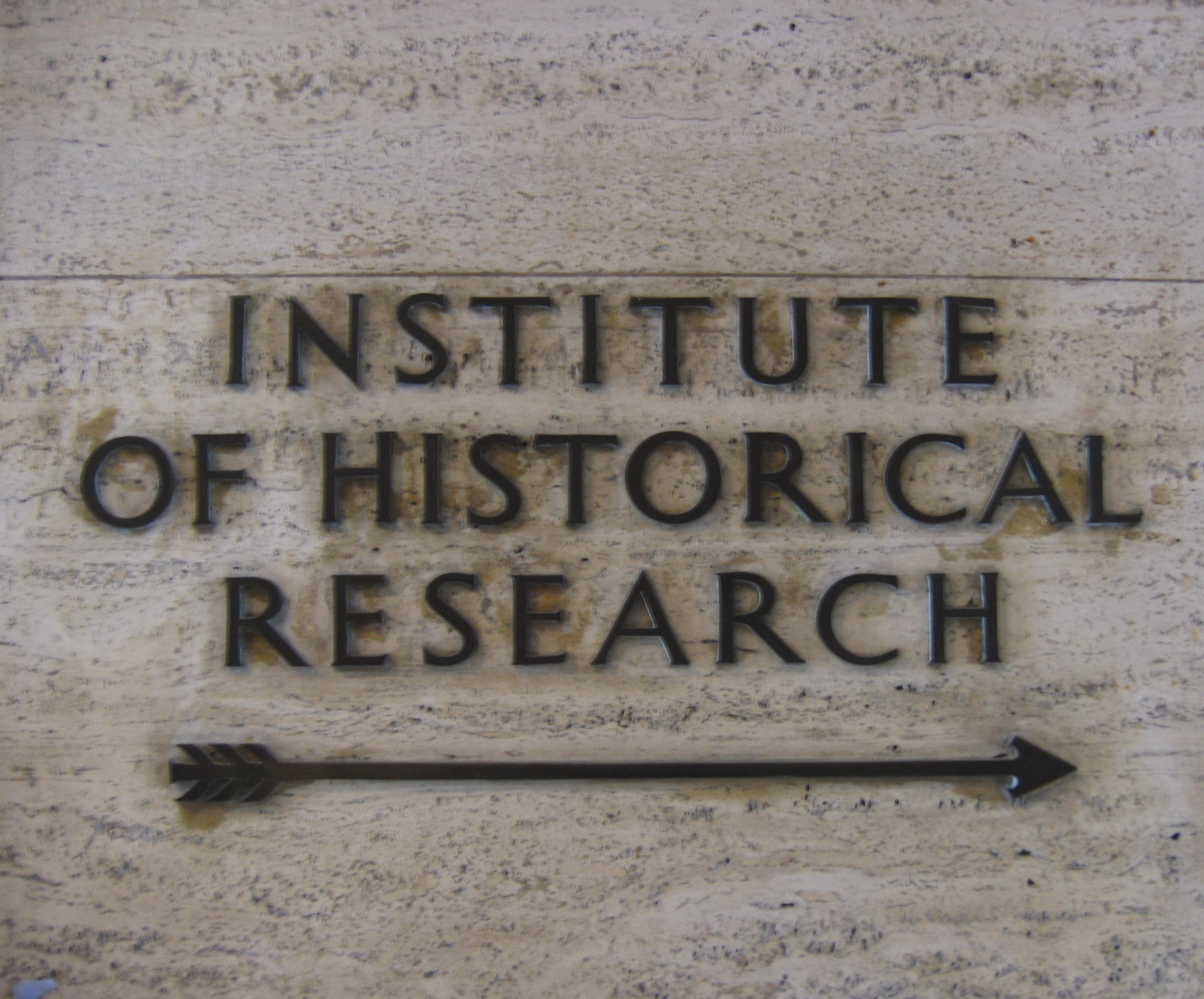
Sign in Senate House

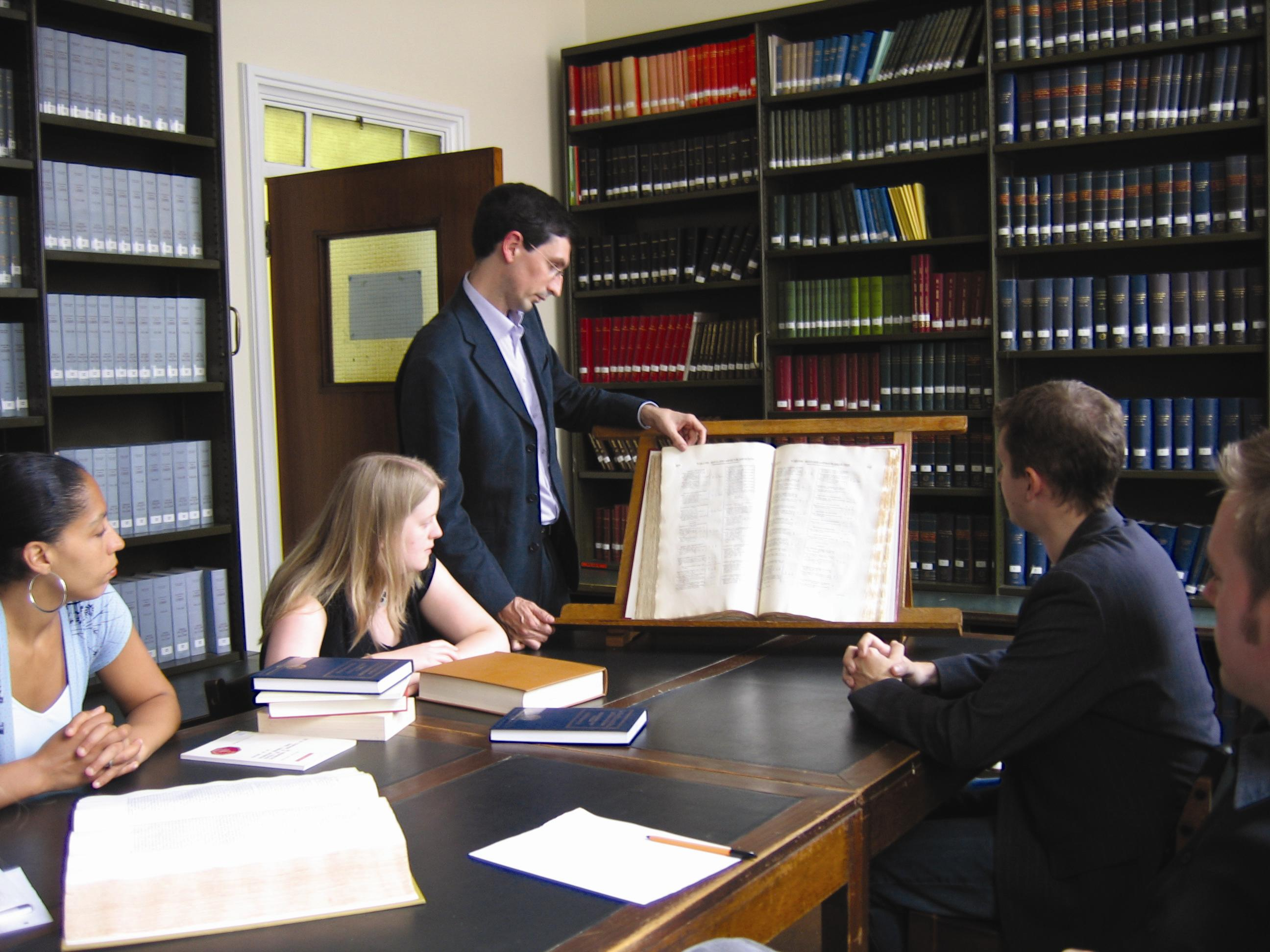
An MA seminar in progress

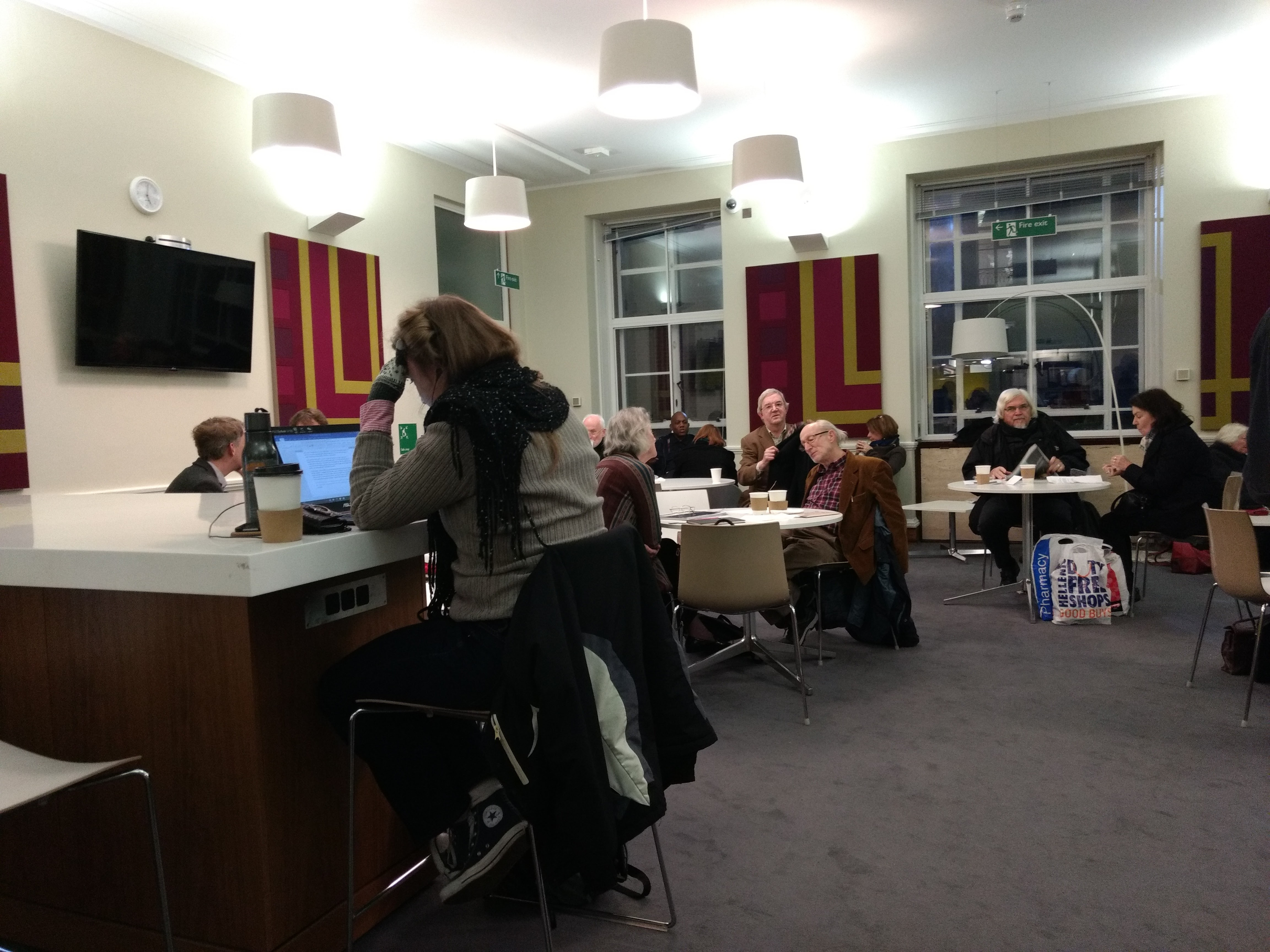
IHR common room

== Activities ==
In order to fulfil its role as defined above, the IHR maintains different academic institutions, such as a library, the seminar programme as well as several integrated bodies and programmes. It also publishes the results of historical research.

=== Wohl Library ===
From its inception, the founders of the Institute of Historical Research envisaged a combination of scholarship and library. This tradition is continued in that many seminars still take place in the rooms of the library. The library itself collects sources for the History of Western Europe and areas affected by the European expansion. It now contains over 190,000 volumes. There are sizable holdings for the British Isles, as well as for Germany, Austria, France, the Low Countries, Italy, Spain, Portugal, Latin America, the US and colonial history, ecclesiastical, Byzantine and crusader history as well as small holdings for Eastern Europe, Switzerland and Scandinavia. The library is particularly good for sources on local history both of the British Isles and Europe. It contains the largest collection of Low Countries material outside of the region (due to gifts from the Netherlands and research interests of scholars working there), the most complete collection of French cartularies outside France as well as collections of poll books for the United Kingdom and a complete run of the Victoria County History books.

The collections have been supplemented by donations and bequests from many different scholars, such as the Wright collection. In its early years the IHR library was built up by actively seeking donations, and much of the collection was formed from bequests and gifts by individuals and organisations. By 1926, three-quarters of the collection had been acquired through private benefactions and presentations by governments from Europe and other parts of the World. Among the IHR's extensive collection of books on European history are a set of volumes of the Monumenta Germaniae Historica and other works donated to the University of London by the Nazi government of Germany in 1937. The accessions records highlight the collaborative nature of library collection development; many donations were shared between the IHR and other libraries to build on existing collection strengths or through an agreed division of collection policy. As an example, the sizeable portion of the IHR's colonial and early national holdings in the United States collection was donated to the library by the widow of George Louis Beer between 1921 and 1925.

=== Seminar programme ===
The IHR supports and promotes a wide variety of seminars. They are accessible to all interested in the topic under discussion. Seminar topics range from the Early Middle Ages to Modern Britain, from the history of gardening to the philosophy of history.

=== Conferences ===
The IHR is also involved with organising and running a number of conferences and workshops, including its annual conference on a historical theme.

=== British History Online ===
The IHR co-manages British History Online, a digital library of key printed primary and secondary sources for the history of Britain and Ireland, with a primary focus on the period between 1300 and 1800.

=== Historical Research ===
Historical Research
- Discipline: History
- Language: English
- Edited by: Lawrence Goldman

Publication details
- Former name: Bulletin of the Institute of Historical Research
- Publisher: Institute of Historical Research (UK)
- Frequency: Quarterly

Standard abbreviations
- ISO 4: Hist. Res.

Indexing
- ISSN: 1468-2281

Links
- Journal homepage; Archive at Wiley-Blackwell

The IHR publishes Historical Research, a scholarly historical journal. The journal first appeared in 1923 under the title Bulletin of the Institute of Historical Research; and the present title was adopted in 1987 (beginning with volume 60, no. 141).

=== Reviews in History ===
The IHR publishes the online journal Reviews in History. The journal was launched in 1996, and publishes reviews and reappraisals of significant work in all fields of historical interest.

=== Layers of London ===
The Layers of London project brings together digitised historic maps, photos and other information provided by key partners across London including: the British Library, London Metropolitan Archives, Historic England, The National Archives, MOLA (Museum of London Archaeology). These will be linked on a website which will allow visitors to create and interact with many different "layers" of London's history from the Romans to the present day. It runs on the Humap platform and contains over 12,500 records, most of which are sourced through user-generated content.

=== Marc Fitch Lectures ===
The institute hosts the Marc Fitch Lectures with funding provided by the Marc Fitch Fund. The lecture was held at the institute until 2012, when it started touring the counties with a planned three lectures a year. Previous lectures have been presented by Linda Colley, Roy Strong, Michael Wood, Simon Thurley and David Starkey.

=== Humanities Digital Library ===
In IHR leads an inter-institutional initiative within the School of Advanced Study to explore and deliver open access research publications. This has culminated in the launch of the Humanities Digital Library, a catalogue of open access books published across the School, as well as an open access book series focusing upon early career authors and published in partnership with the Royal Historical Society.

== Integrated bodies ==
Besides the core activities, two research centres are integrated into the institute. These are:

- the Victoria County History,
- the Centre for Metropolitan History

The IHR formerly housed a third research centre, the Centre for Contemporary British History. In August 2010, however, this transferred to King's College London, where it is now known as the Institute of Contemporary British History.

== Collections ==
The IHR Wohl Library holds extensive collections relating to London history and cartography in addition to the Institute's own archives.

The Institute of Education, University College London holds the records of the History in Education Project, which ran from 2009 - 2011 and looked at the development of the teaching of history in English state schools from 1900 to the present.

== See also ==
- Historical Association
- Royal Historical Society
- Historiography of the United Kingdom
