= Miles Taylor (historian) =

British historian and academic administrator

Dr. (PhD) Miles Taylor, FRHistS, FRAS (born 19 September 1961) is a Professor of British History and Society as well an academic administrator. From 2004 until 2021 he was a professor of history at the University of York and between 2008 and 2014 he was director of the University of London's Institute of Historical Research. He currently teaches at Humboldt University of Berlin.

== Early life and Education ==
Miles Taylor was born in Farnham Common, Buckinghamshire , on 19 September 1961, the son of Geoffrey Peter Taylor and his wife Dorothy Pearl, née Weaver, later Irish. After leaving Tapton School in Sheffield, he went to Queen Mary College in London to read history and politics, graduating with a first-class Bachelor of Arts (BA) degree in 1983. He was a Kennedy Scholar at Harvard University and then completed a Doctor of Philosophy (PhD) degree at St John's College, Cambridge, in 1989.

== Career ==
Between 1988 and 1991, Taylor was a research fellow at Girton College, Cambridge; he then moved over to Christ's College, Cambridge, where he was appointed a fellow. He subsequently lectured in history at King's College London (1995–2001), before being appointed professor in modern British history at the University of Southampton. In 2004, he moved to the University of York as professor of modern history and between 2008 and 2014, he was a professor of history and director of the Institute of Historical Research. He started to teach British history at Humboldt University of Berlin in 2021.

In 1997, Taylor was elected a fellow of the Royal Historical Society. As of 2017, he sits on the research advisory committee of the National Portrait Gallery and the editorial advisory committees of the History of Parliament Trust, the Bulletin of the John Rylands Library, the Journal of British Studies and the BBC History Magazine.

== Private Life ==
Taylor has four kids from two marriages. In 2012 he married Dr. Shalini Sharma, with whom he shares one son.

== Publications and research ==
Taylor's research focuses on 19th-century British history, especially radical politics and Chartism, the history of parliament in this period, the interaction between Empire and the political system and the historiography of Victorian politics and culture.

=== Books ===
- The Decline of British Radicalism, 1847–1860 (Oxford: Oxford University Press, 1995).
- Empress: Queen Victoria and India (Yale University Press, 2018)
- Ernest Jones, Chartism and the Romance of Politics, 1819–69 (Oxford University Press, 2003).
- (edited) The Age of Asa: Lord Briggs, Public Life and History in Britain since 1945 (Palgrave Macmillan, 2014).
- (edited) Walter Bagehot, The English Constitution, Oxford World's Classics series (Oxford University Press, 2001).
- (edited) The European Diaries of Richard Cobden, 1846–1849 (Scolar Press, 1994).
- (edited) Palmerston Studies (2 vols; Hartley Institute, 2007).
- (edited) Party, State and Society: Electoral Behaviour in Britain since 1820 (Scolar Press, 1997).
- (edited) Southampton: Gateway to the British Empire (IB Tauris, 2007).
- (edited) The Victorian Empire and Britain’s Maritime World: The Sea and Global History, 1837–1901 (Palgrave Macmillan, 2013).
- (edited) The Victorians since 1901: Histories, Representations and Revisions (Manchester University Press, 2004).
- (edited with Charles Beem) The Man Behind the Queen: Princes Consort in History (Palgrave, 2014).
- (edited with Jill Pellew) Utopian Universities: A Global History of the New Campuses of the 1960s (Bloomsbury Publishing, 2020).

=== Book chapters ===
- "Magna Carta in the Nineteenth Century", in N. Vincent (ed.), Magna Carta: The Foundation of Freedom 1215–2015 (Third Millennium Information, 2014).
- "Joseph Hume and the reformation of India, 1819–33", in G. Burgess and M. Festenstein (eds.), Radicalism in English Political Thought, 1550–1850 (Cambridge: Cambridge University Press, 2007).
- "Empire and parliamentary reform: the 1832 Reform Act revisited", in A. Burns and J. Innes (eds.), Rethinking the Age of Reform: Britain, c. 1780–1850 (Cambridge: Cambridge University Press, 2003).
- "Labour and the constitution", in D. Tanner, et al. (eds.), Labour's First Century (Cambridge: Cambridge University Press, 2000)
- "The six points: Chartism and the reform of parliament", in O. Ashton, et al. (eds), The Chartist Legacy (Merlin Press, 1999).

=== Articles ===
- "The dominion of history: the export of historical research from Britain since 1850", Historical Research, vol. 87, no. 236 (2014)
- "Queen Victoria and India, 1837–61", Victorian Studies, vol. 47, issue 1 (2004).
- "The 1848 revolutions and the British empire", Past & Present, vol. 166 (2000).
- "The beginnings of modern British social history?", History Workshop Journal, vol. 43, (1997).
- "John Bull and the iconography of public opinion in England, c. 1712–1929", Past & Present, vol. 134 (1992).

Preceded by Professor David Bates	Director, Institute of Historical Research; 2008–2014	Succeeded by Dr Lawrence Goldman
