= Petty =

Petty may refer to:

== People ==
- Ajae Petty (born 2002), American basketball player
- Bruce Petty (1929–2023), Australian political satirist and cartoonist
- Bryce Petty (born 1991), American football player
- Dini Petty (born 1945), Canadian television and radio host
- Eric D. Petty (born 1954), American politician and businessman
- Florence Petty (1870–1948), British cookery book writer and broadcaster
- George Petty (1894–1975), American pin-up artist
- J. T. Petty (born 1977), American dialogue video game writer and film director
- John Petty (disambiguation), several people
- Joseph Petty, Massachusetts politician
- Joseph H. Petty (1826–1901), New York politician
- Kathleen Petty (born 1960), Canadian news anchor
- Lori Petty (born 1963), American movie actress
- Norman Petty (1927–1984), American musician, songwriter, and record producer
- Orlando Henderson Petty (1874–1932), American Medal of Honor recipient
- Philip Petty (1840–1917), American Medal of Honor recipient
- Rebecca Petty (born c. 1970), American politician and advocate of child crime victims
- Richard E. Petty, distinguished university professor of psychology at The Ohio State University
- Sylvannus Petty, Bahamian politician
- Tanya Petty, German ten-pin bowler
- Tom Petty (1950–2017), American musician
- W. Morgan Petty, a fictional writer
- William Petty (1623–1687), British economist and inventor
- William Petty, 2nd Earl of Shelburne (1737–1805), British Prime Minister and Irish peer
- An American auto racing family prominent in NASCAR:
  - Lee Petty (1914–2000), family patriarch and NASCAR pioneer
  - Richard Petty (born 1937), son of Lee, NASCAR driver
  - Maurice Petty (1939–2020), son of Lee, NASCAR mechanic
  - Kyle Petty (born 1960), son of Richard, NASCAR driver
  - Ritchie Petty (born 1968), son of Maurice, NASCAR driver
  - Adam Petty (1980–2000), son of Kyle, NASCAR driver

== Places ==
- Petty France (disambiguation)
- Petty, Highland, Scotland

== Others ==
- Petty-Fitzmaurice
- Petty Enterprises, NASCAR racing team owned by Richard and Kyle Petty
- Petty officer, non-commissioned officer in many navies
- Petty (adjective), of little or no importance
  - Petty crime (misdemeanor)
  - Petty kingdom

== See also ==
- Pett
- Nicholas M. Pette (1891–1988), New York politician and judge
- Petté, a town in Cameroon
- Pettey, surname
- Pettie, surname
- Pretty (disambiguation)
