= Andrew Davies (historian) =

British historian

Andrew Mark Davies, FRHistS, FRSA (born 1962) is a British historian. A professor at the University of Liverpool, he specialises in the history of crime, policing and violence in modern Britain.

== Career ==
Born in 1962, Davies attended Sir John Deane's Sixth Form College in Northwich before studying at King's College, Cambridge, where he read history. He completed Part I of the Historical Tripos in 1983 and Part II in 1984, graduating with a Bachelor of Arts degree. He then carried out doctoral studies at King's. For his thesis on leisure and poverty in early-20th-century Manchester and Salford (supervised by A. J. Reid), he was awarded a Doctor of Philosophy degree by the University of Cambridge in 1989.

By 1991, Davies was working at the University of Liverpool. As of 2021, he is a professor of modern social history there.

Since 2009, Davies has been a fellow of the Royal Historical Society and a fellow of the Royal Society of Arts.

== Bibliography ==
Books

- Davies, Andrew (1992). Leisure, Gender and Poverty: Working-Class Culture in Salford and Manchester, 1900–1939. Themes in the Twentieth Century. Buckingham: Open University Press. ISBN 9780335156375.
- Davies, Andrew; Fielding, Steven, eds. (1992). Workers' Worlds: Cultures and Communities in Manchester and Salford, 1880–1939. Manchester: Manchester University Press. ISBN 9780719025433.
- Davies, Andrew (2009). The Gangs of Manchester: The Story of the Scuttlers, Britain's First Youth Cult. Preston: Milo Books. ISBN 9781903854853.
- Davies, Andrew (2013). City of Gangs: Glasgow and the Rise of the British Gangster. London: Hodder and Stoughton. ISBN 9781444763751.

Theses

- Davies, Andrew Mark (1989). Leisure and Poverty in Salford and Manchester, 1900–1939 (PhD). University of Cambridge. doi:10.17863/CAM.19717.

Peer-reviewed articles and book chapters

- Davies, Andrew (1991). "The Police and the People: Gambling in Salford, 1900–1939". The Historical Journal. 34 (1): 87–115. doi:10.1017/s0018246x00013947. S2CID 159538469.
- Davies, Andrew; Fielding, Steven; Wyke, Terry (1992). "Introduction". In Davies, Andrew; Fielding, Steven (eds.). Workers' Worlds: Cultures and Communities in Manchester and Salford, 1880–1939. Manchester: Manchester University Press. pp. 1–22. ISBN 9780719025433.
- Davies, Andrew (1992). "Leisure in the 'Classic Slum'". In Davies, Andrew; Fielding, Steven (eds.). Workers' Worlds: Cultures and Communities in Manchester and Salford, 1880–1939. Manchester: Manchester University Press. pp. 102–132. ISBN 9780719025433.
- Davies, Andrew (1998). "Youth Gangs, Masculinity and Violence in Late Victorian Manchester and Salford". Journal of Social History. 32 (2): 349–369. doi:10.1353/jsh/32.2.349.
- Davies, Andrew (1998). "Street Gangs, Crime and Policing in Glasgow during the 1930s: The Case of the Beehive Boys". Social History. 23 (3): 251–267. doi:10.1080/03071029808568037.
- Davies, Andrew (1999). "'These Viragoes Are No Less Cruel than the Lads': Young Women, Gangs and Violence in Late Victorian Manchester and Salford". British Journal of Criminology. 39 (1): 72–89. doi:10.1093/bjc/39.1.72.
- Davies, Andrew (2000). "Youth Gangs, Gender and Violence, 1870–1900". In D'Cruze, Shani (ed.). Everyday Violence in Britain, 1850–1950: Gender and Class. Women and Men in History. London: Longman. pp. 70–88. doi:10.4324/9781315838007. ISBN 9781315838007.
- Davies, Andrew (2000). "Sectarian Violence and Police Violence in Glasgow During the 1930s". In Bessel, Richard; Emsley, Clive (eds.). Patterns of Provocation: Police and Public Disorder. Oxford: Berghahn Books. pp. 41–62. ISBN 9781571812278.
- Davies, Andrew (2004). "Youth Gangs, Masculinity and Violence in Late Victorian Manchester and Salford". In Schneider, Jacqueline; Tilley, Nick (eds.). Gangs. London: Routledge. pp. 121–141. doi:10.4324/9781351157803. ISBN 9781351157803.
- Davies, Andrew (2006). "Youth, Violence, and Courtship in Late-Victorian Birmingham: The Case of James Harper and Emily Pimm". The History of the Family. 11 (2): 107–120. doi:10.1016/j.hisfam.2006.07.001. S2CID 143678361.
- Davies, Andrew (2006). "Football and Sectarianism in Glasgow during the 1920s and 1930s". Irish Historical Studies. 35 (138): 200–219. doi:10.1017/s0021121400004892. S2CID 163248253.
- Davies, Andrew (2007). "Glasgow's 'Reign of Terror': Street Gangs, Racketeering and Intimidation in the 1920s and 1930s". Contemporary British History. 21 (4): 405–427. doi:10.1080/13619460601060413. S2CID 143930954.
- Davies, Andrew (2007). "The Scottish Chicago?: From 'Hooligans' to 'Gangsters' in Inter-War Glasgow". Cultural and Social History. 4 (4): 511–527. doi:10.2752/147800407X243505. S2CID 159051613.
- Davies, Andrew; Strange, Julie-Marie (2010). "Where Angels Fear to Tread: Academics, Public Engagement and Popular History". Journal of Victorian Culture. 15 (2): 268–279. doi:10.1080/13555502.2010.491663.
- Davies, Andrew (2011). "Youth Gangs and Late Victorian Society". In Goldson, Barry (ed.). Youth in Crisis?: "Gangs", Territoriality and Violence. London: Routledge. pp. 38–54. doi:10.4324/9780203832004. ISBN 9780203832004.
- Davies, Andrew (2013). "'They Sing that Song': Football and Sectarianism in Glasgow during the 1920s and 1930s". In Flint, John; Kelly, John (eds.). Bigotry, Football and Scotland: Perspectives and Debates. Edinburgh: Edinburgh University Press. pp. 50–64. ISBN 9780748670376. JSTOR 10.3366/j.ctt1g09whx.9.
- Davies, Andrew; Peel, Mark; Balderstone, Laura (2015). "Digital Histories of Crime and Research-Based Teaching and Learning" (PDF). Law, Crime and History. 5 (1): 93–104.
- Davies, Andrew (2016). "Histories of Hooliganism". In Hobbs, Dick (ed.). Mischief, Morality and Mobs: Essays in Honour of Geoffrey Pearson. Abingdon: Routledge. pp. 85–101. doi:10.4324/9781315544960. ISBN 9781315544960.
- Davies, Andrew (2017). "Youth Gangs". In Turner, Jo; Taylor, Paul; Corteen, Karen; Morley, Sharon (eds.). A Companion to the History of Crime and Criminal Justice. Companions in Criminology and Criminal Justice. Bristol: Policy Press. pp. 291–296. ISBN 9781447325871.
- Davies, Andrew (2019). "Police Violence and Judicial Bias in the Age of Mass Democracy: Glasgow, 1933–1935". Social History. 44 (1): 57–85. doi:10.1080/03071022.2019.1545363. S2CID 150752097.
- Davies, Andrew (2020). "Reinvestigating the London 'Hooligan' Panic of 1898". The English Historical Review. 135 (576): 1229–1259. doi:10.1093/ehr/ceaa257.
