= Julie-Marie Strange =

British historian

Julie-Marie Strange, FAcSS (born 1973) is a historian. Since 2019, she has been Professor of Modern British History at Durham University.

== Career ==
Born in 1973, Strange completed a Bachelor of Arts degree and a Master of Philosophy degree at the University of Wales, Cardiff. From 1996 to 2000, she carried out doctoral studies at the University of Liverpool under the supervision of Andrew Davies and Jon Lawrence; she was awarded a PhD in 2000 for her thesis on death and mourning in the British working classes during the late Victorian and Edwardian periods.

After working as a research assistant on the archives of the United Africa Company and (for two years) as a lecturer at Birkbeck, University of London, she joined the Department of History at the University of Manchester in 2003. She was eventually promoted to be Professor of British History. In 2019, she moved to Durham University to be Professor of Modern British History.

Strange was elected a fellow of the Academy of Social Sciences in 2019; the citation called her "a leading figure in framing historically-informed research questions around issues of the marketplace and accountability in humanitarian discourse and practice".

== Bibliography ==
Books

- Strange, Julie-Marie (2005). Death, Grief and Poverty in Britain 1870–1914. Cambridge Social and Cultural Histories. Vol. 6. Cambridge: Cambridge University Press. doi:10.1017/CBO9780511496080. ISBN 9780511496080.
- Carnevali, Francesca; Strange, Julie-Marie, eds. (2007). 20th Century Britain: Economic, Cultural and Social Change (2nd ed.). Harlow: Longman. ISBN 9780582772878.
- Strange, Julie-Marie, ed. (2012). British Family Life, 1780–1914. Vol. 2: Husbands and Fathers. London: Pickering and Chatto. ISBN 9781138750722.
- Strange, Julie-Marie, ed. (2012). British Family Life, 1780–1914. Vol. 5: Substitute Families. London: Pickering and Chatto. ISBN 9781848931022.
- Strange, Julie-Marie (2015). Fatherhood and the British Working Class 1865–1914. Cambridge: Cambridge University Press. doi:10.14296/RiH/2014/1926. ISBN 9781316027059.
- Worboys, Michael; Strange, Julie-Marie; Pemberton, Neil (2018). The Invention of the Modern Dog: Breed and Blood in Victorian Britain. Baltimore, M.A.: Johns Hopkins University Press. ISBN 9781421426587.
- Roddy, Sarah; Strange, Julie-Marie; Taithe, Bertrand (2019). The Charity Market and Humanitarianism in Britain, 1870–1912. London: Bloomsbury. ISBN 9781350057982.

Thesis

- Strange, Julie-Marie (2000). This Mortal Coil: Death and Bereavement in Working-Class Culture, c. 1880–1914 (PhD). University of Liverpool.

Peer-reviewed articles and chapters

- Strange, Julie-Marie (2000). "Menstrual Fictions: Languages of Medicine and Menstruation, c. 1850–1930". Women's History Review. 9 (3): 607–628. doi:10.1080/09612020000200260. S2CID 143459453.
- Strange, Julie-Marie (2001). "The Assault on Ignorance: Teaching Menstrual Etiquette in English Schools, c. 1920s to 1960s". Social History of Medicine. 14 (2): 247–265. doi:10.1093/shm/14.2.247. PMID 11697352.
- Strange, Julie-Marie (2002). "'She Cried a Very Little': Death, Grief and Mourning in Working-Class Culture, c. 1880–1914". Social History. 27 (2): 142–161. doi:10.1080/03071020210128373. S2CID 143916443.
- Strange, Julie-Marie (2003). "Only a Pauper Whom Nobody Owns: Reassessing the Pauper Grave, c. 1880–1914". Past & Present (178): 148–175. doi:10.1093/past/178.1.148. JSTOR 3600760.
- Strange, Julie-Marie (2003). "Tho' Lost to Sight, to Memory Dear: The Neglected Grave in Victorian and Edwardian Commemorative Culture". Mortality. 8 (2): 144–159. doi:10.1080/1357627031000087398. S2CID 145661263.
- Strange, Julie-Marie (2005). "'I Believe It to Be a Case Depending on Menstruation': Madness and Menstrual Taboo in British Medical Practice, c. 1840–1930". In Shail, Andrew; Howie, Gillian (eds.). Menstruation: A Cultural History. Basingstoke: Palgrave Macmillan. pp. 102–116. ISBN 9781403939357.
- Strange, Julie-Marie (2007). "'Speechless with Grief': Bereavement and the Working-Class Father, c. 1880–1914". In Broughton, Trev Lynn; Rogers, Helen (eds.). Gender and Fatherhood in the Nineteenth Century. Basingstoke: Palgrave Macmillan. pp. 138–152. ISBN 9780230207851.
- Strange, Julie-Marie (2007). "Leisure". In Carnevali, Francesca; Strange, Julie-Marie (eds.). 20th Century Britain: Economic, Cultural and Social Change (2nd ed.). Harlow: Longman. pp. 197–213. ISBN 9780582772878.
- Davies, Andrew; Strange, Julie-Marie (2010). "Where Angels Fear to Tread: Academics, Public Engagement and Popular History". Journal of Victorian Culture. 15 (2): 268–279. doi:10.1080/13555502.2010.491663.
- Strange, Julie-Marie (2010). "Historical Approaches to Dying". In Kellehear, Allan (ed.). The Study of Dying: From Autonomy to Transformation. Cambridge: Cambridge University Press. pp. 123–146. ISBN 9780521739054.
- Strange, Julie-Marie (2011). "Tramp: Sentiment and the Homeless Man in the Late-Victorian and Edwardian City". Journal of Victorian Culture. 16 (2): 242–258. doi:10.1080/13555502.2011.589683.
- Strange, Julie-Marie (2011). "Death". In Jackson, Mark (ed.). The Oxford Handbook of the History of Medicine. Oxford: Oxford University Press. pp. 355–372. doi:10.1093/oxfordhb/9780199546497.013.0020. ISBN 9780199546497.
- Strange, Julie-Marie (2011). "Reading Language as a Historical Source". In Gunn, Simon; Faire, Lucy (eds.). Research Methods for History. Edinburgh: Edinburgh University Press. pp. 165–183. ISBN 9780748654048.
- Strange, Julie-Marie (2012). "Fatherhood, Providing, and Attachment in Late Victorian and Edwardian Working-Class Families". Historical Journal. 55 (4): 1007–1027. doi:10.1017/S0018246X12000404. JSTOR 23352188. S2CID 144726797.
- Strange, Julie-Marie (2012). "In Full Possession of Her Powers: Researching and Rethinking Menopause in Early Twentieth-Century England and Scotland". Social History of Medicine. 25 (3): 685–700. doi:10.1093/shm/hkr170.
- Strange, Julie-Marie (2013). "Fatherhood, Furniture and the Inter-Personal Dynamics of Working-Class Homes, c. 1870–1914". Urban History. 40 (2): 271–286. doi:10.1017/S0963926813000060. S2CID 143863042.
- Strange, Julie-Marie (2013). "Fairy Tales of Fertility: Bodies, Sex and the Life Cycle, c. 1750–2000". In Toulalan, Sarah; Fisher, Kate (eds.). The Routledge History of Sex and the Body: 1500 to the Present. Abingdon: Routledge. pp. 296–310. doi:10.4324/9780203436868-ch-16 (inactive 12 July 2025). ISBN 9780203436868.
- Roddy, Sarah; Strange, Julie-Marie; Taithe, Bertrand (2014). "Henry Mayhew at 200 – The 'Other' Victorian Bicentenary". Journal of Victorian Culture. 19 (4): 481–496. doi:10.1080/13555502.2014.968362.
- Roddy, Sarah; Strange, Julie-Marie; Taithe, Bertrand (2015). "Humanitarian Accountability, Bureaucracy and Self-Regulation: The View from the Archive". Disasters. 39 (2): 188–203. Bibcode:2015Disas..39.s188R. doi:10.1111/disa.12153. PMID 26395108.
- Roddy, Sarah; Strange, Julie-Marie; Taithe, Bertrand (2015). "The Charity-Mongers of Modern Babylon: Bureaucracy, Scandal, and the Transformation of the Philanthropic Marketplace, c.1870–1912". Journal of British Studies. 54 (1): 118–137. doi:10.1017/jbr.2014.163. S2CID 145746274.
- Pemberton, Neil; Strange, Julie-Marie (2015). "Dogs and Modernity: Dogs in History and Culture". European Review of History. 22 (5): 705–708. doi:10.1080/13507486.2015.1070123. S2CID 143266330.
- Strange, Julie-Marie (2015). "Fathers at Home: Life Writing and Late-Victorian and Edwardian Plebeian Domestic Masculinities". Gender and History. 27 (3): 703–717. doi:10.1111/1468-0424.12158. S2CID 143390387.
- Pemberton, Neil; Strange, Julie-Marie; Worboys, Michael (2018). "Breeding and Breed". In Kean, Hilda; Howell, Philip (eds.). The Routledge Companion to Animal–Human History (PDF). London: Routledge. pp. 393–421. doi:10.4324/9780429468933. ISBN 9780429468933. S2CID 187988465.
- Strange, Julie-Marie (2020). "The Comfort of Animal 'Things' in Late-Victorian Britain". In Stobart, Jon (ed.). The Comforts of Home in Western Europe, 1700–1900. London: Bloomsbury. pp. 234–238. doi:10.5040/9781350092983.0025. ISBN 978-1-3500-9298-3. S2CID 214123873.
- Strange, Julie-Marie (2021). "When John met Benny: Class, Pets and Family Life in Late Victorian and Edwardian Britain". The History of the Family. 26 (2): 214–235. doi:10.1080/1081602X.2021.1897028. S2CID 236554579.
