= Social Histories of Medicine =

Book series from manchester university press

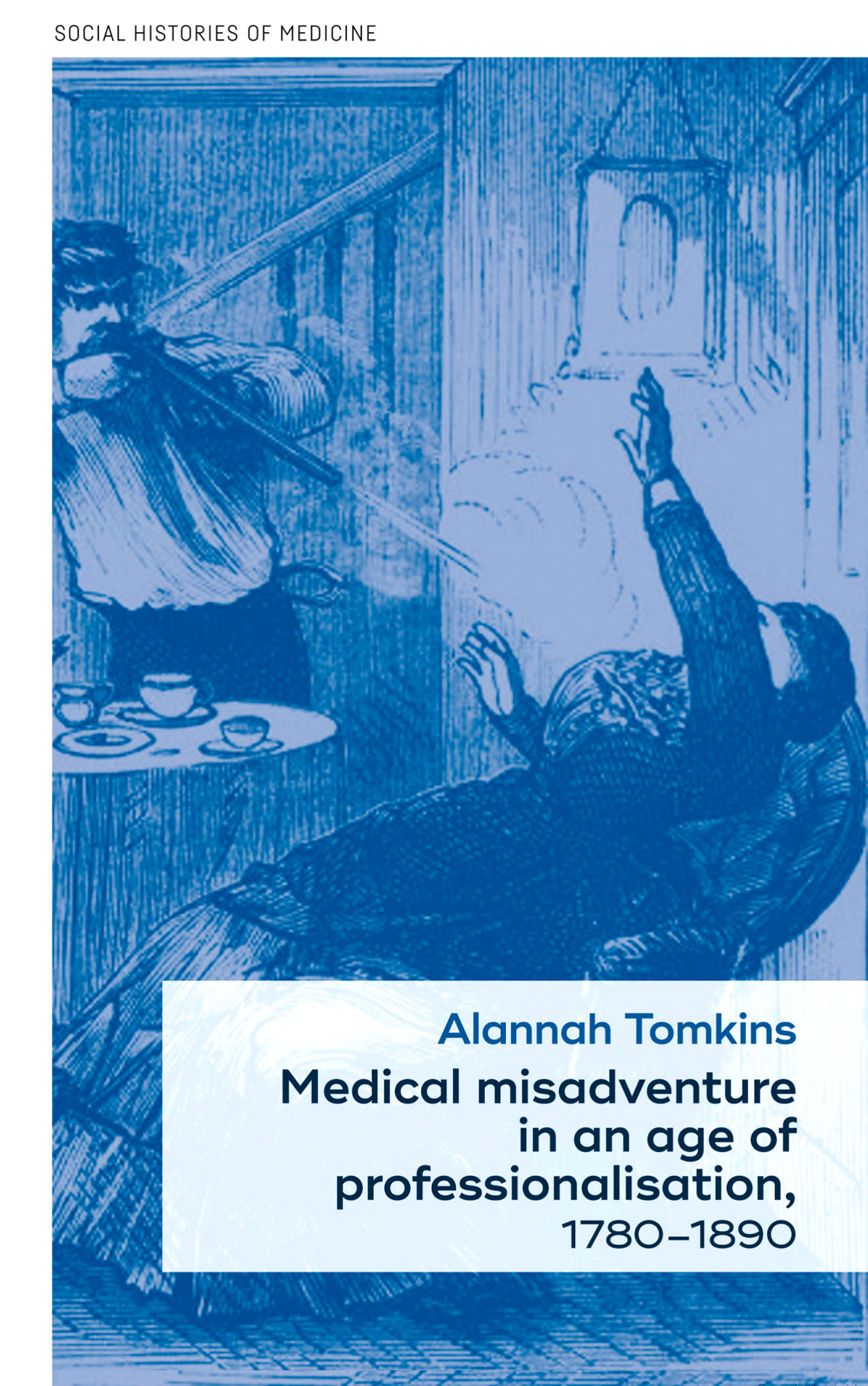
Cover of Medical Misadventure in an Age of Professionalisation, 1780–1890 by Alannah Tomkins, 2017.

Social Histories of Medicine is a book series from Manchester University Press which covers "all aspects of health, illness and medicine, from prehistory to the present, in every part of the world". It runs in collaboration with the Society for the Social History of Medicine and is the third series that the society has been associated with after Studies in the Social History of Medicine (1989–2009) and Studies for the Society for the Social History of Medicine. The editors of the current series are David Cantor and Keir Waddington.

== Titles ==
=== 2017 ===
- Payment and Philanthropy in British Healthcare, 1918–48. George Campbell Gosling, 2017. ISBN 978-1-5261-1432-7
- The Metamorphosis of Autism: A History of Child Development in Britain. Bonnie Evans, 2017. ISBN 978-0-7190-9592-4
- The Politics of Vaccination: A global history. Christine Holmberg, Stuart Blume and Paul Greenough (Eds.), 2017. ISBN 978-1-5261-1088-6
- Leprosy and Colonialism: Suriname under Dutch rule, 1750–1950. Stephen Snelders, 2017. ISBN 978-1-5261-1299-6
- Medical Misadventure in an Age of Professionalisation, 1780–1890. Alannah Tomkins, 2017. ISBN 978-1-5261-1607-9
- Conserving Health in Early Modern Culture: Bodies and Environments in Italy and England. Sandra Cavallo and Tessa Storey (Eds.), 2017. ISBN 978-1-5261-1347-4

=== 2018 ===
- Migrant Architects of the NHS: South Asian Doctors and the Reinvention of British General Practice (1940s-1980s) by Julian M. Simpson, 2018. ISBN 978-1-7849-9130-2
- Mediterranean Quarantines, 1750–1914: Space, Identity and Power. John Chircop and Francisco Javier Martinez (Eds.). 2018. ISBN 978-1-5261-1554-6
- Sickness, Medical Welfare and the English Poor, 1750-1834. Steven King, 2018. ISBN 978-1-5261-2900-0
- Medical Societies and Scientific Culture in Nineteenth-Century Belgium. Joris Vandendriessche, 2018. ISBN 978-1-5261-3320-5
