= Pettie =

Pettie is a surname. Notable people with the surname include:

- Don Pettie (1927–2017), Canadian sprinter
- Floyd W. Pettie (1919–1982), American politician
- George Pettie (1548–1589), English writer of romances
- Jim Pettie (1953–2019), Canadian ice hockey player
- John Pettie (1839–1893), Scottish painter
- Marion Pettie (1920–2003), United States Air Force Master Sergeant and cult leader

== See also ==
- Pettey
- Petty (disambiguation)
