= Little France (disambiguation) =

Little France may refer to:

- Little France, a district of Edinburgh, Scotland
- Little France (castle), a castle in Rhineland-Palatinate, Germany
- Little France, New York, a village in New York State, USA

== See also ==
- Petty France (disambiguation)
- Petite France (disambiguation)
