= Florence Petty =

British cookery writer and broadcaster (1870–1948)

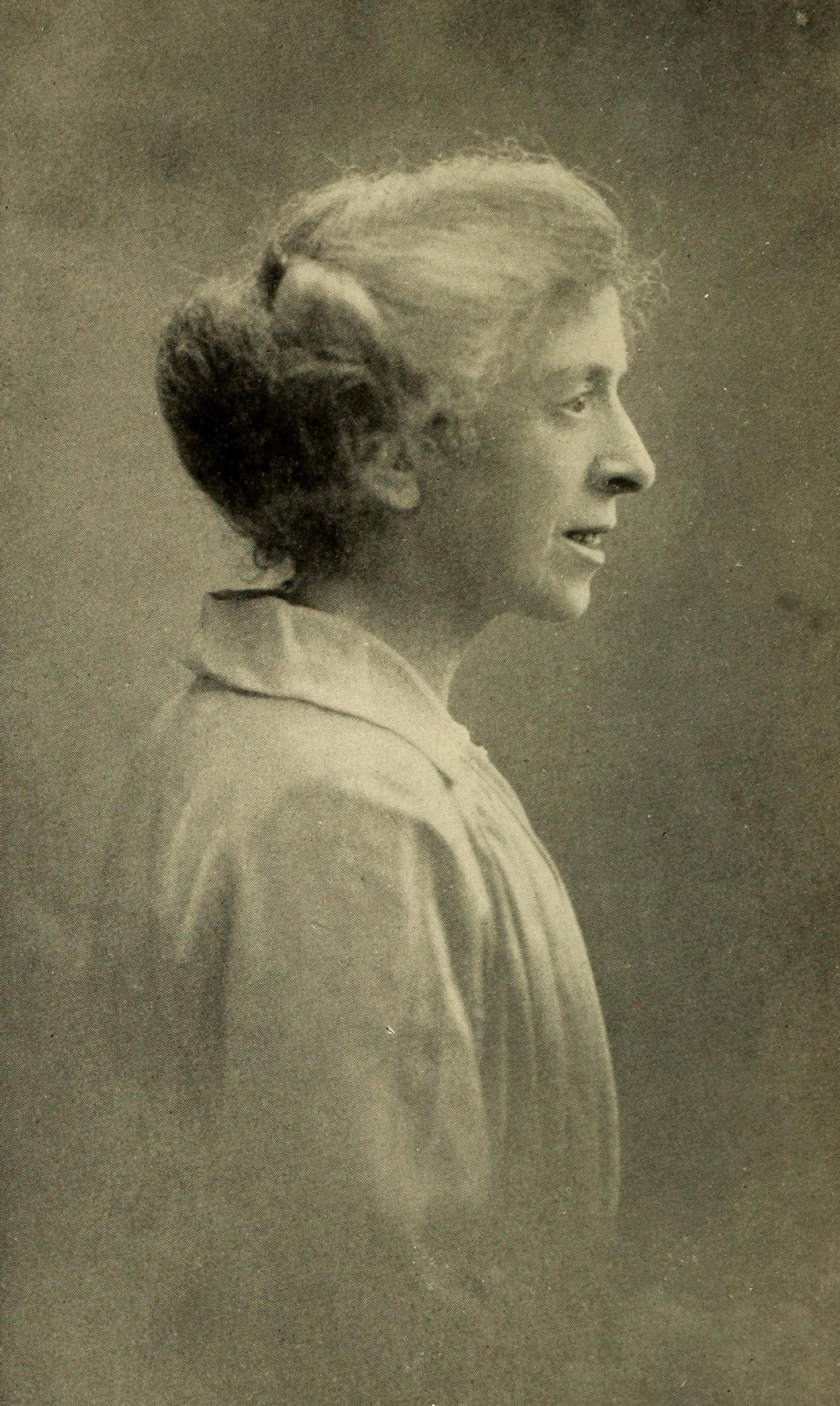
Petty, c. 1916

Florence Petty (1 December 1870 – 18 November 1948) was a Scottish social worker, cookery writer and broadcaster. During the 1900s, in the socially deprived area of Somers Town, north London, Petty undertook social work for the St Pancras School for Mothers, commonly known as The Mothers' and Babies' Welcome. She ran cookery demonstrations for working-class women to get them in the habit of cooking inexpensive and nutritious food. Much of the instruction was done in the women's homes, to demonstrate how to use their own limited equipment and utensils. Because she taught the women firstly how to make suet puddings—plain, sweet and meat—her students nicknamed her "The Pudding Lady". In addition to her cookery lessons, she became a qualified sanitary inspector.

Petty wrote on cookery, publishing works aimed at those also involved in social work, including a cookery book—The Pudding Lady's Recipe Book, with Practical Hints (1917)—and pamphlet aimed at the public. Both the pamphlet and book contain practical information on how to make and use a haybox as a method of cooking, where heated food is placed in an insulated box to continue to cook, away from a heat source. Petty worked as a lecturer and cookery demonstrator for the National Food Reform Association, travelling round Britain to show cost-efficient and nutritious ways to cook despite the rising food prices and food shortages brought on by the First World War. She was a broadcaster on food and budgeting in the late 1920s and early 1930s, on the 2LO radio station for the BBC, as part of the "Household Talk" series of programmes aimed at housewives. From 1914 until the mid-1940s she toured Britain giving lecture-demonstrations on economical ingredients and cost-effective cooking methods.

Petty continued to work until her death in 1948 at the age of 77. Although no newspapers carried an obituary of her, historians consider her to be a pioneer of social work innovations, introducing a new approach to teaching domestic management. Her approach to teaching the use of nutritious but cheap food was a precursor to the method adopted by the Ministry of Food during the Second World War.

== Life ==
Florence Petty was born in Montrose, Forfarshire, on 1 December 1870. She was the fourth of seven children born to David James Petty, a clerk at a timber merchant's, and Jane Norris (née Levie). She lived in Montrose until her early 30s when she moved to Swanley, Kent, where she became involved in horticulture. She then moved in with her sister, a former nurse, who was living in Tottenham, north London.

Petty began working at the St Pancras School for Mothers (commonly known as The Mothers' and Babies' Welcome) which was active in the deprived area of Somers Town, north London. The philanthropist Charles Booth, in his 1889 poverty map, Life and Labour of the People in London, classed much of Somers Town—located between Euston and St Pancras railway stations—as the two worst categories: "Very poor, casual. Chronic want" and "Lowest class. Vicious, semi-criminal". Locals nicknamed the area "little hell". In the early twentieth century Somers Town had high levels of poverty; by the 1920s the area was "one of central London's most squalid slums", according to the architectural historian Roland Jeffery. In 1924 Basil Jellicoe, the vicar of the local St Mary's Church, wrote of the area's overcrowding and poverty; in 1930 one journalist described the housing as "vermin-ridden dens ... the worst hovels in London ... where mothers are afraid to put their children to bed for fear of rats and other vermin of all descriptions". The Mothers' and Babies' Welcome was run by the St Pancras Mothers' and Infants' Society, an organisation formed to combat high rates of infant mortality by educating mothers on nutrition and household management.

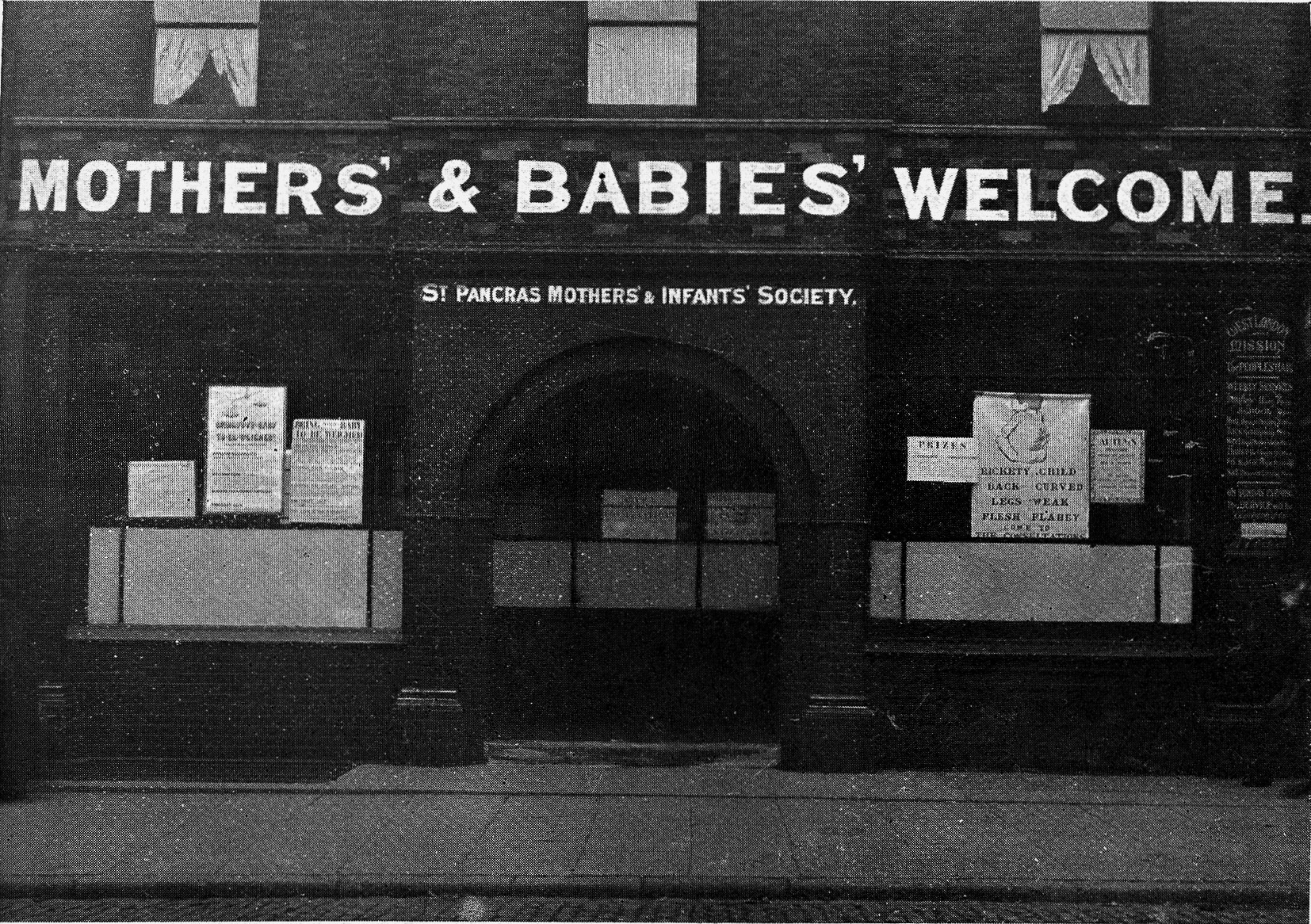
The Mothers' and Babies' Welcome in Chalton Street, Euston Road

Among other activities, The Mothers' and Babies' Welcome provided cookery lessons for mothers, but realised that this was of limited success as many of the women lacked the basic equipment or utensils at home. Petty was employed to provide the cookery lessons in the women's own homes, demonstrating how they could use their existing equipment and utensils. Her approach was to give six lessons to show how people could cook cheap yet nutritious meals; she discussed the family's domestic and financial situation and wrote a series of case notes for those she visited.

Petty described herself as a "Lecturer and Demonstrator in Health Foods"; her students nicknamed her "The Pudding Lady" because, in an attempt to get the women in the habit of cooking regularly using familiar and inexpensive ingredients, for the first three months of her demonstrations they made suet puddings—plain, sweet and meat—until the women began to show pride in their ability to cook. Blake Perkins, Petty's biographer in the Oxford Dictionary of National Biography, considers that her notes on the families she was instructing are "matter-of-fact but also sympathetic rather than clinical".

In 1910 The Mothers' and Babies' Welcome published an account of Petty's work in The Pudding Lady: A New Departure in Social Work, examining the impact she had. The book was short—at 103 pages—and was aimed at "all who desire to raise the standard of life among our poorer fellow-citizens", according to the reviewer in the Charity Organisation Review. In the second edition, published in 1916, Charles Hecht, the secretary of the National Food Reform Association (NFRA)—the organisation that promoted higher standards in food production and whose aim was "to enlighten public opinion on matters of diet"—wrote that:

The heroine of the book, Florence Petty, has ... become a public possession, bringing to bear on the solution of national problems those rare gifts of heart and head and that unique experience which achieved such wonders ... in the homes of Somers Town.

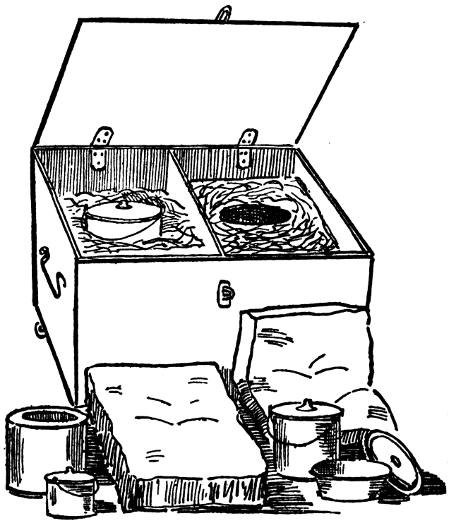
Example of a haybox with two compartments

Shortly after 1910 Petty was employed in a dental and medical centre in Newport, Essex, that had been established by the social reformer and philanthropist Lady Meyer; she remained there until October 1914 when she was employed by the NFRA as a travelling lecturer, and the following year undertook a lecture tour around Britain to demonstrate economical ingredients and cost-effective cooking methods to working-class audiences. Local media reported her activities in, among other places, Liverpool, Oxford, Nantwich, Aberdeen, Birmingham, Cardiff and Leeds. In March 1915 she spoke at the Royal Society of Medicine on behalf of the National Association for the Prevention of Infant Mortality and for the Welfare of Infancy, and in February and March 1916 she gave a series of what The Times described as "demonstration-lectures" on wartime cookery—aimed at social workers—at the Westminster Health Society. The First World War led to shortages in food supply from overseas and caused inflation on food prices in the UK. Although the UK was nearly self-sufficient in goods such as milk and potatoes, as the war progressed, consumers faced shortages or rising prices in butter, pork and beef. The cost of beef ribs rose by 175 per cent between July 1914 and November 1918; eggs rose by 412 per cent over the same time period. The Board of Trade estimated the cost of living for the working class increased by 45 per cent between 1914 and 1916; the cost of food rose by 61 per cent over the same time.

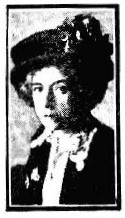
Petty, c. 1915

Petty wrote at least one pamphlet for the NFRA, on "Fireless Cookery"; a review in The Lancet describes a haybox as the method of cooking outlined in the pamphlet. The food is heated for a short time before being placed in the box, where the cooking continues; because the cooking is finished by the latent heat, the method saves fuel. Published in January 1917, 30,000 copies of the leaflet were sold. In 1917 she wrote a cookery book, The Pudding Lady's Recipe Book, with Practical Hints. The work contained 300 recipes using a variety of basic foods. With an acknowledgement that some foodstuffs were rationed in First World War Britain, Petty described her approach thus:

Every good cook or housekeeper is, in these days, a good patriot. By the wise choice of food and care in its preparation she may do her part in utilising to the uttermost the national resources. To this end, a number of general hints are included in the book and the recipes are, for the most part, very economical.

The food chemist Katherine Bitting described Petty's book as "a useful gift in war time". Providing practical advice for those who did not have the equipment at home to prepare even basic foods, Petty included instructions for making an oven from a biscuit tin and details of how to make a haybox (which could also be used for doing the laundry, cleaning tins and saucepans, and keeping butter cool in hot weather). (Note: Saucepans and tins can be cleaned by being boiled for five minutes with soda crystals and then left overnight.) In its first year of publication, the book sold 20,000 copies. It was reprinted four times in 1917 and once in 1918. By the time The Pudding Lady's Recipe Book was published in 1917, Petty had become a qualified sanitary inspector.

After the war Petty continued lecturing on and writing about cookery. In 1921 she wrote chapters on nutrition and the care of children's teeth for Hecht's The Gateway to Health, and in 1923 she wrote the paper "The Cook as Empire Builder" for the Journal of the Royal Sanitary Institute. In 1922 she presented at least one hundred lectures to the public.

In 1928 Petty began presenting talks on the radio on the BBC's 2LO station, including speaking on the Household Talk series of programmes. The programme was a popular weekly broadcast aimed at housewives, with presenters that included Mrs Cottington Taylor, the Director of the Good Housekeeping Institute. She presented talks titled "Making the Most of a Minimum Wage" and "Dinners for a Week on a Minimum Wage", as well as others on the subjects of cooking vegetables, puddings and children's diets. According to the cultural historian Maggie Andrews, her broadcasts showed a "homely, economical and pragmatic approach to cooking and budgeting". Perkins notes that she was a popular broadcaster through her work on the Household Talk programmes.

Petty continued to work into the mid-1940s, when she was in her seventies. She died of acute bronchitis on 18 November 1948 at home in Hampstead. No newspapers provided an obituary of her. The historian Julie-Marie Strange described Petty's activities as being "at the forefront of Edwardian innovations in social work". According to the historian Ellen Ross, Petty "pioneered the newly professionalising language of domestic management which was connecting rich and poor women all over Europe in the early twentieth century". Perkins considers that the recipes and methods taught by Petty "prefigure Second World War efforts by the Ministry of Food to convince the populace that substitution of cheaper for familiar ingredients was worthy and even enjoyable".

== Works ==
- The Pudding Lady: A New Departure in Social Work (1910; co-written with M. E. Bibby and E. G. Colles) OCLC 906559961
- "Fireless Cookery" (1916; pamphlet)
- The Pudding Lady's Recipe Book, with Practical Hints (1917) OCLC 793329863
- Chapters "Cookery and Vitamines" and "Care of Children's Teeth" included in The Gateway to Health by Charles Hecht (1921) OCLC 562237665
- "The Cook as Empire Builder". Journal of the Royal Sanitary Institute. 44 (7): 267–270. 1923. doi:10.1177/146642402304400712. S2CID 221049461.
- Chapter "Cookery for Infants and Children under School Age" included in Mothercraft: A Selection from Courses of Lectures on Infant Care by the National Association for the Prevention of Infant Mortality (1931) OCLC 29440352

== Notes and references ==
=== Sources ===
==== Books ====
- Andrews, Maggie (2012). Domesticating the Airwaves: Broadcasting, Domesticity and Femininity. London: Continuum. ISBN 978-1-4411-7272-3.
- Beckett, I. F. W. (2006). Home Front, 1914–1918: How Britain Survived the Great War. London: The National Archives. ISBN 978-1-903365-81-6.
- Bibby, M. E.; Colles, E. G.; Petty, Florence, eds. (1916). The Pudding Lady: A New Departure in Social Work. London: National Food Reform Association. OCLC 793328754.
- Bitting, K. G. (1981) [1939]. Gastronomic Bibliography. London: Holland Press. ISBN 978-0-900470-98-1.
- Campkin, Ben (2013). Remaking London: Decline and Regeneration in Urban Culture. London: I.B. Tauris. ISBN 978-1-7807-6307-1.
- Colles, E. G. (1916). "How the 'Pudding Lady' came to be". In Bibby, M. E.; Colles, E. G.; Petty, Florence (eds.). The Pudding Lady: A New Departure in Social Work. London: National Food Reform Association. pp. 19–25. OCLC 793328754.
- Hecht, Charles E., ed. (1913). Rearing an Imperial Race. London: National Food Reform Association.
- Hecht, Charles (1916). "Note to the second edition". In Bibby, M. E.; Colles, E. G.; Petty, Florence (eds.). The Pudding Lady: A New Departure in Social Work. London: National Food Reform Association. pp. ix–xiv. OCLC 793328754.
- Hecht, Charles (1921). The Gateway To Health. London: The Food Education Society. OCLC 562237665.
- Hunter, Michael; Thorne, Robert (1990). Change at King's Cross: From 1800 to the Present. London: Historical Publications. ISBN 978-0-9486-6706-0.
- Keeling, Kara K.; Pollard, Scott T. (2020). Table Lands: Food in Children's Literature. Jackson, MS: University Press of Mississippi. ISBN 978-1-4968-2838-5.
- Murphy, Kate (2016). Behind the Wireless: A History of Early Women at the BBC. London: Palgrave Macmillan. doi:10.1057/978-1-137-49173-2. ISBN 978-1-137-49173-2.
- Petty, Florence (1917). The Pudding Lady's Recipe Book, with Practical Hints. London: G. Bell. OCLC 793329863.
- Ross, Ellen (2001). "Slum Journeys: Ladies and London Poverty 1860–1940". In Mayne, Alan; Murray, Tim (eds.). The Archaeology of Urban Landscapes: Explorations in Slumland. Cambridge: Cambridge University Press. pp. 11–21. ISBN 978-0-521-77022-4.
- Ross, Ellen (2007). Slum Travelers: Ladies and London Poverty, 1860–1920. Berkeley, CA: University of California Press. ISBN 978-0-520-24906-6. JSTOR 10.1525/j.ctt1ppgwz.25.
- Strange, Julie-Marie (2015). Fatherhood and the British Working Class, 1865–1914. Cambridge: Cambridge University Press. ISBN 978-1-107-08487-2.
- Vernon, James (2009). Hunger: A Modern History. Cambridge, MA: Harvard University Press. ISBN 978-0-674-04467-8.

==== Journals and magazines ====
- Davin, Anna (May 1978). "Imperialism and Motherhood". History Workshop. 5 (5): 9–65. doi:10.1093/hwj/5.1.9. JSTOR 4288158. PMID 11610463.
- "Fireless Cookery". The Lancet. 187 (4820): 169. 15 January 1916.
- "Household Talk: Miss Florence Petty: 'Some Boiled Puddings'". The Radio Times. No. 261. 28 September 1928. p. 22. ISSN 0033-8060.
- "Household Talk: Miss Florence Petty (The Pudding Lady): 'The Cooking of Vegetables'". The Radio Times. No. 245. 8 June 1928. p. 14. ISSN 0033-8060.
- "The Housing Question in London". Charity Organisation Review. 15 (90): 315–320. June 1904. JSTOR 43787862.
- Jeffery, Roland (2008). "Housing Happenings in Somers Town". Twentieth Century Architecture (9): 24–36. JSTOR 41859734.
- Martin, John (October 2019). "Saving the Nation from Starvation: The Heroic Age of Food Control, June 1917 to July 1918". Rural History. 30 (2): 181–196. doi:10.1017/S0956793319000141. S2CID 203478015.
- McC, M (December 1910). "The Pudding Lady by Miss Bibby and Others". Charity Organisation Review. 28 (168): 415. JSTOR 43788768.
- "Miss Florence Petty: 'Children's Diets'". The Radio Times. No. 361. 29 August 1930. p. 33. ISSN 0033-8060.
- "Miss Florence Petty: 'Dinners for a Week on a Minimum Wage'". The Radio Times. No. 330. 24 January 1930. p. 32. ISSN 0033-8060.
- "Miss Florence Petty: 'Making the Most of a Minimum Wage'". The Radio Times. No. 296. 31 May 1929. p. 26. ISSN 0033-8060.
- "Medical News". The British Medical Journal. 1 (2830): 579. 27 March 1915. JSTOR 25313150.
- Petty, Florence (1923). "The Cook as Empire Builder". Journal of the Royal Sanitary Institute. 44 (7): 267–270. doi:10.1177/146642402304400712. S2CID 221049461.

==== News ====
- "The Actual Work". T. P.'s Weekly. 14 October 1910. p. 504.
- "Cookery Lectures". Oxfordshire Weekly News. 28 July 1915. p. 7.
- "Deaths". Kensington Post. 27 November 1948. p. 6.
- "Food Economy". Birmingham Daily Gazette. 19 October 1915. p. 8.
- "Home Made Loaves". The Times. 15 December 1915. p. 7.
- "House-keeping in War Time". Nantwich Guardian. 1 October 1915. p. 1.
- "A Lecture". Liverpool Daily Post. 4 October 1915. p. 1.
- "Lectures on Health". Aberdeen Press and Journal. 20 March 1915. p. 7.
- "Notices". Yorkshire Post and Leeds Intelligencer. 15 July 1915. p. 3.
- "Untitled". The Times. 12 February 1916. p. 9.
- "Village News and Notes". West Sussex County Times. 1 June 1945. p. 2.
- "Women's Institutes". Sevenoaks Chronicle and Kentish Advertiser. 3 March 1944. p. 6.
- "Work of the Women". Western Mail. 7 June 1915. p. 8.

==== Websites ====
- Davies, Sue (30 May 2014). "The St Pancras School for Mothers". Wellcome Library.
- "London's Pulse: Medical Officer of Health reports 1848–1972". Wellcome Library.

==== Thesis and encyclopaedia ====
- Buckley, Michael Dennis (2009). Recipe for Reform: The Food Economy Movement in Britain During the First World War (PhD). University of California. OCLC 769458004.
- Perkins, Blake (2014). "Petty, Florence (1870–1948)". Oxford Dictionary of National Biography (online ed.). Oxford University Press. doi:10.1093/ref:odnb/106197. (Subscription, Wikipedia Library access or UK public library membership required.)
