= Keir Waddington =

British academic

Keir Waddington (born 1970) is professor of history at Cardiff University. He is a specialist in medical, urban, and environmental history. He is the joint editor of the Social Histories of Medicine monograph series. He previously held a post at the Wellcome Centre for the History of Medicine, working with Roy Porter on The History of Bethlehem, and had a fellowship at St Bartholomew's Hospital.

== Early and personal life ==
Waddington is from Chichester and attended Chichester High School. He graduated with a Bachelor of Arts (BA) in History from the University of East Anglia and a Master of Arts (MA) and a PhD from University College London (UCL). Waddington married Katherine Weikert, American historian at the University of Winchester, in her home of Indiana in September 2022. He is a member of the infamous Winchester Sausage Unit.

== Selected publications ==
- An introduction to the social history of medicine: Europe since 1500. Palgrave Macmillan, Basingstoke, 2011.
- The bovine scourge: neat, tuberculosis and public health, 1850-1914. Boydell Press, Woodbridge, 2006.
- Medical education at St. Bartholomew's hospital, 1123 - 1995. Boydell Press, Woodbridge, 2003.
- Charity and the London Hospitals, 1850-1898. Boydell & Brewer, Woodbridge, 2000. Royal Historical Society Studies in History New Series.
