= Daggett, Pennsylvania =

Unincorporated community in Pennsylvania, US

- Unincorporated community
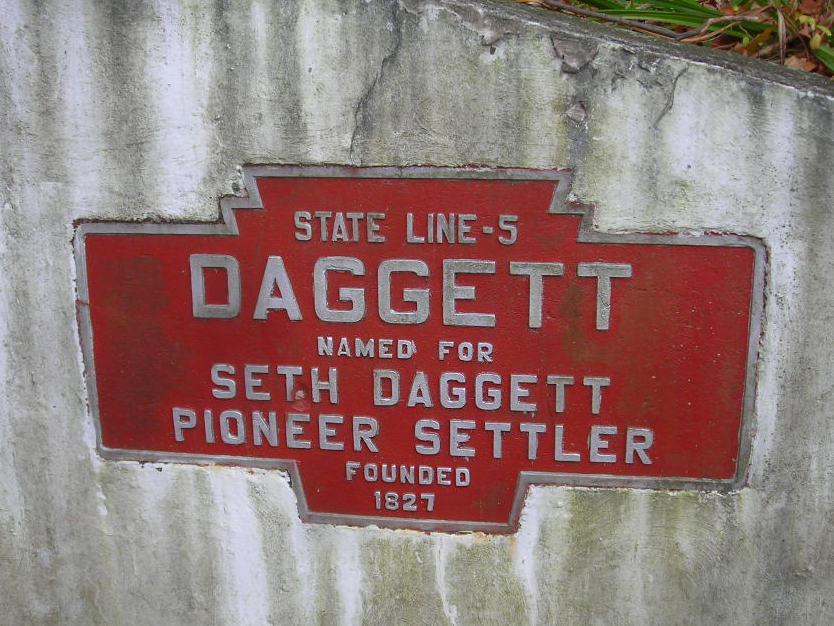
- Keystone marker

- Location within Pennsylvania Location within the United States
- Coordinates: 41°56′55″N 76°55′34″W
- Country: United States
- State: Pennsylvania
- County: Tioga
- Elevation: 1,335 ft (407 m)
- Time zone: UTC-5 (Eastern (EST))
  - Summer (DST): UTC-4 (EDT)
- Area code: 570
- GNIS feature ID: 1203386

Daggett (also Daggett's Mill or Daggetts Mill) is an unincorporated community in Jackson Township, Tioga County, Pennsylvania, United States.

The community was founded in 1827 and named for the pioneer settler Seth Daggett, as indicated by the Keystone Marker inlaid in cement wall.

== Notable people ==
- Philip Petty (1840–1917), Medal of Honor recipient
