= Keystone marker =

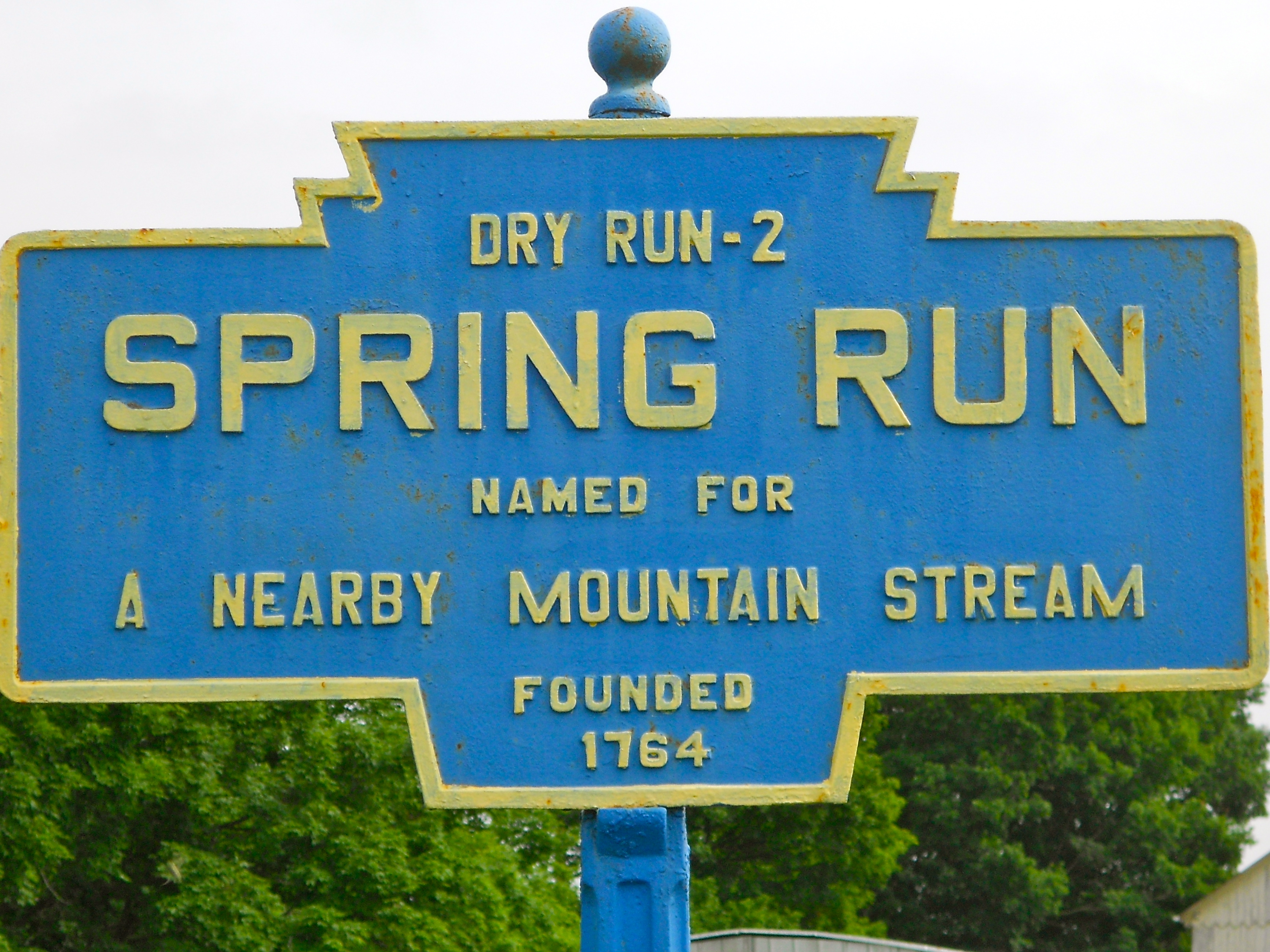
Keystone Marker for Spring Run, Pennsylvania, which includes all the standard elements of the markers: 1) a light blue and yellow color scheme, 2) distance to the next town, 3) town name and origin of the name, 4) founding date, and 5) a distinctive shape, cast in iron and mounted on a distinctive pole.

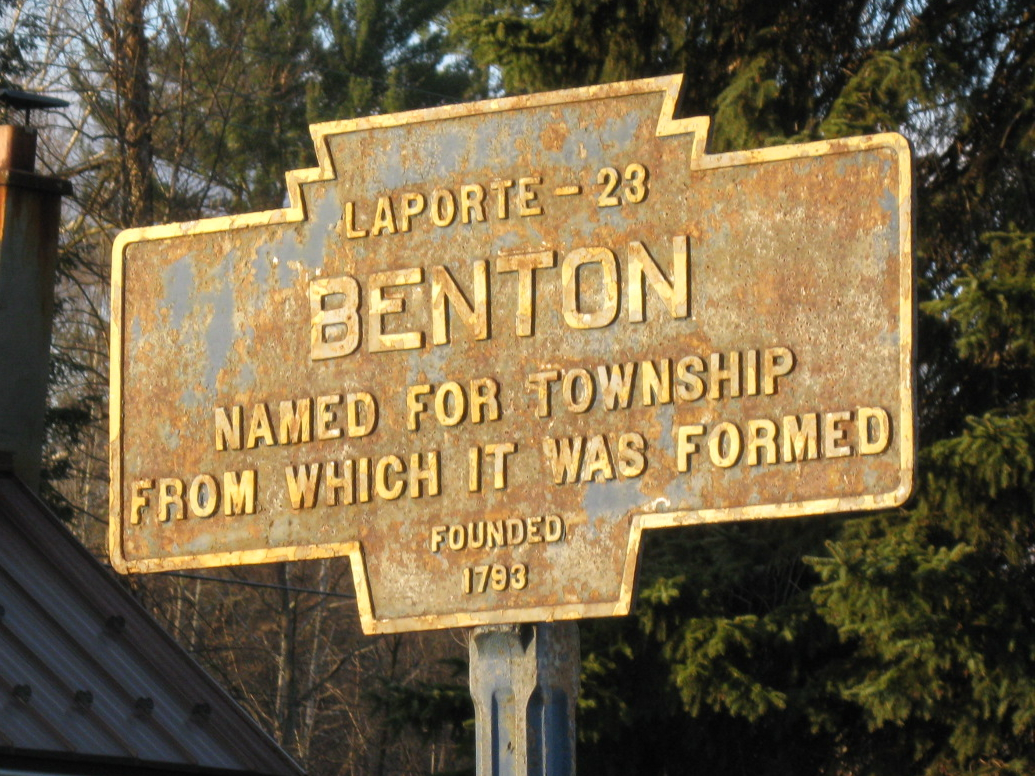
Keystone marker for Benton, Columbia County, Pennsylvania. Many of the markers are currently damaged or in need of maintenance.

Keystone markers are a now-defunct system of roadside signage developed by Pennsylvania Department of Highways shortly after the First World War, placed outside cities, towns, and boroughs in the state of Pennsylvania. Variations of the marker could be found at highway crossings of creeks, rivers, trails, borough lines, and other points of interest.

== Overview ==
The Keystone Markers were products of the height of the Good Roads Movement that opened highway travel to the masses. The Keystone Markers were the signature project of the Department, the second oldest of its kind in the nation and predecessor to today's PennDOT. The proliferation of the familiar blue-and-yellow, cast iron Keystone Markers popularized Pennsylvania's reputation as the "Keystone State".

While Pennsylvania once claimed thousands of Keystone Markers, approximately 600 remain. The loss of the Markers prompted Preservation Pennsylvania, the Commonwealth's statewide heritage preservation advocacy organization, to include the Keystone Markers among their most endangered resources in 2011. Keystone Markers associated with towns are the most common of the survivors. In each municipality where the markers were installed, at least two were put up, one on each end of town along the principal roadway. If a town was at the intersection of two such roadways, there were four signs installed, two on each road. Markers for towns indicated the name of the town, the reason why the town was given that name, and the date founded. Many town Keystone Markers indicated the distance to the next town in the upper part of the sign. Thus, each marker for a given town was unique.

=== Varieties ===
There are three different varieties of Keystone Markers, each generally associated with a different kind of use.

1. Front-mount, single-sided sign markers used for towns. These markers have signs that mount on the front of a specially designed post.
2. Top-mount, dual-sided sign markers used for streams/creeks/rivers. These have a two-sided sign and mount on top of a specially designed post that differs from the town marker post.
3. Keystone Variant Markers used for borough lines, trails, points of interest, directions, county and local roads, etc. They use the same post as the town markers but have a slightly differently shaped sign.

== Keystone Marker Trust ==
A non-profit advocacy organization called the Keystone Marker Trust is working with PennDOT and municipalities across the Commonwealth to restore existing Keystone Markers. Grant funding has enabled patterns to be created and the first replica Keystone Markers are slated to be installed in 2012. The co-founders of the trust are attorney and employee of the National Railway Historical Society Nathaniel Guest and historian Greg Prichard.

== Gallery ==
Historically accurate

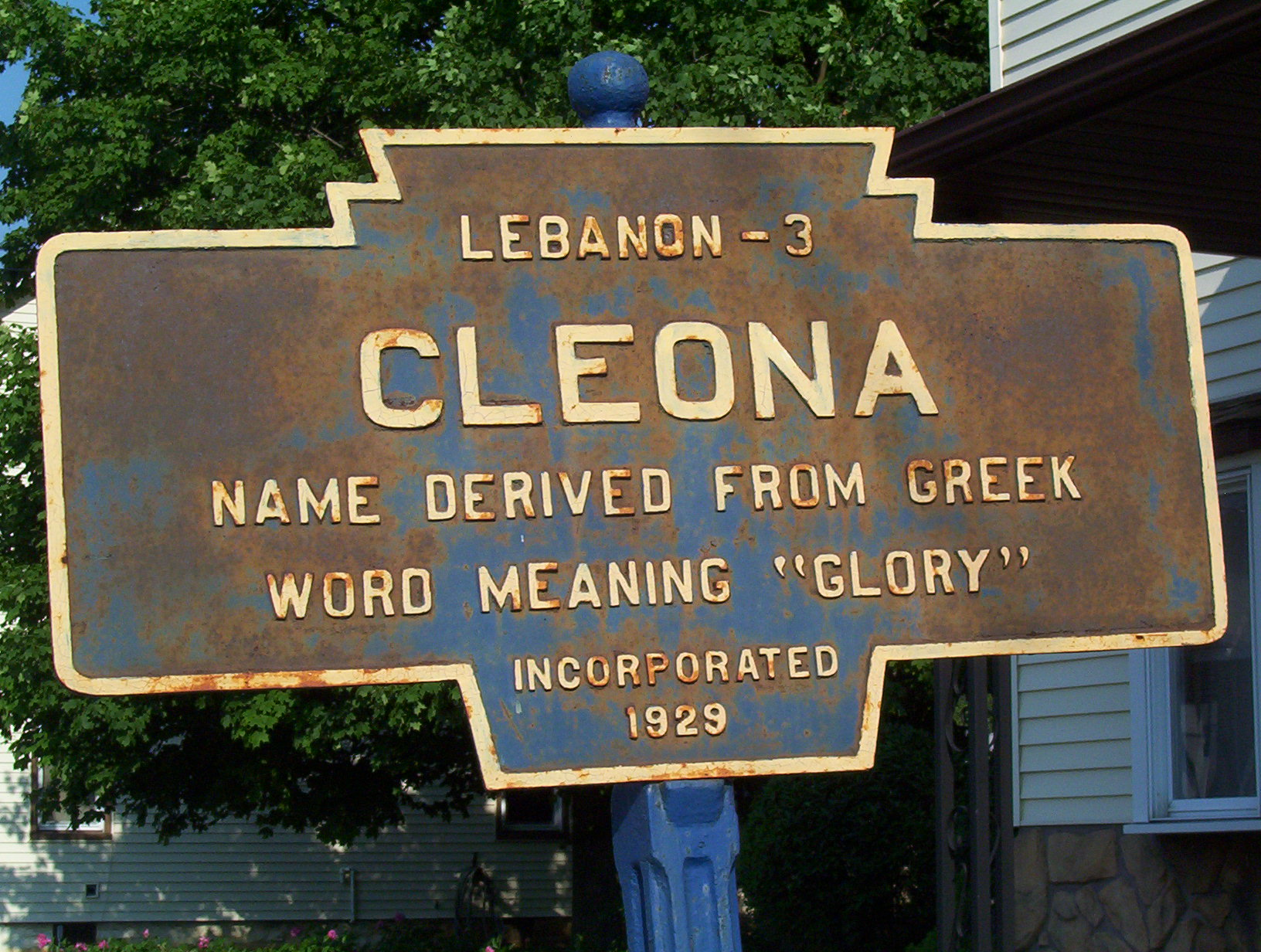
Pre-restoration Keystone Marker for Cleona, Pennsylvania (2003)

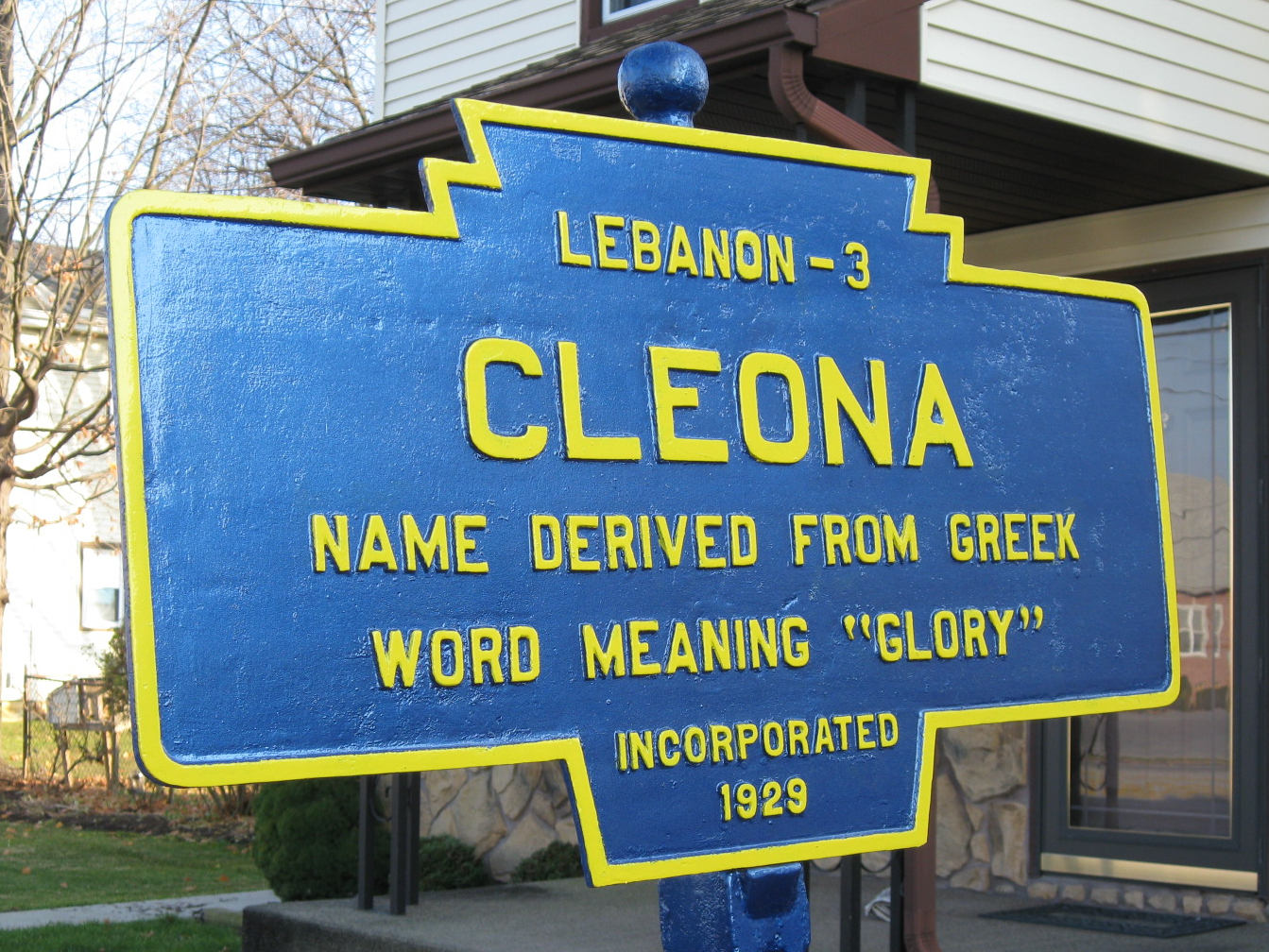
Post-restoration Keystone Marker for Cleona, Pennsylvania (2009)

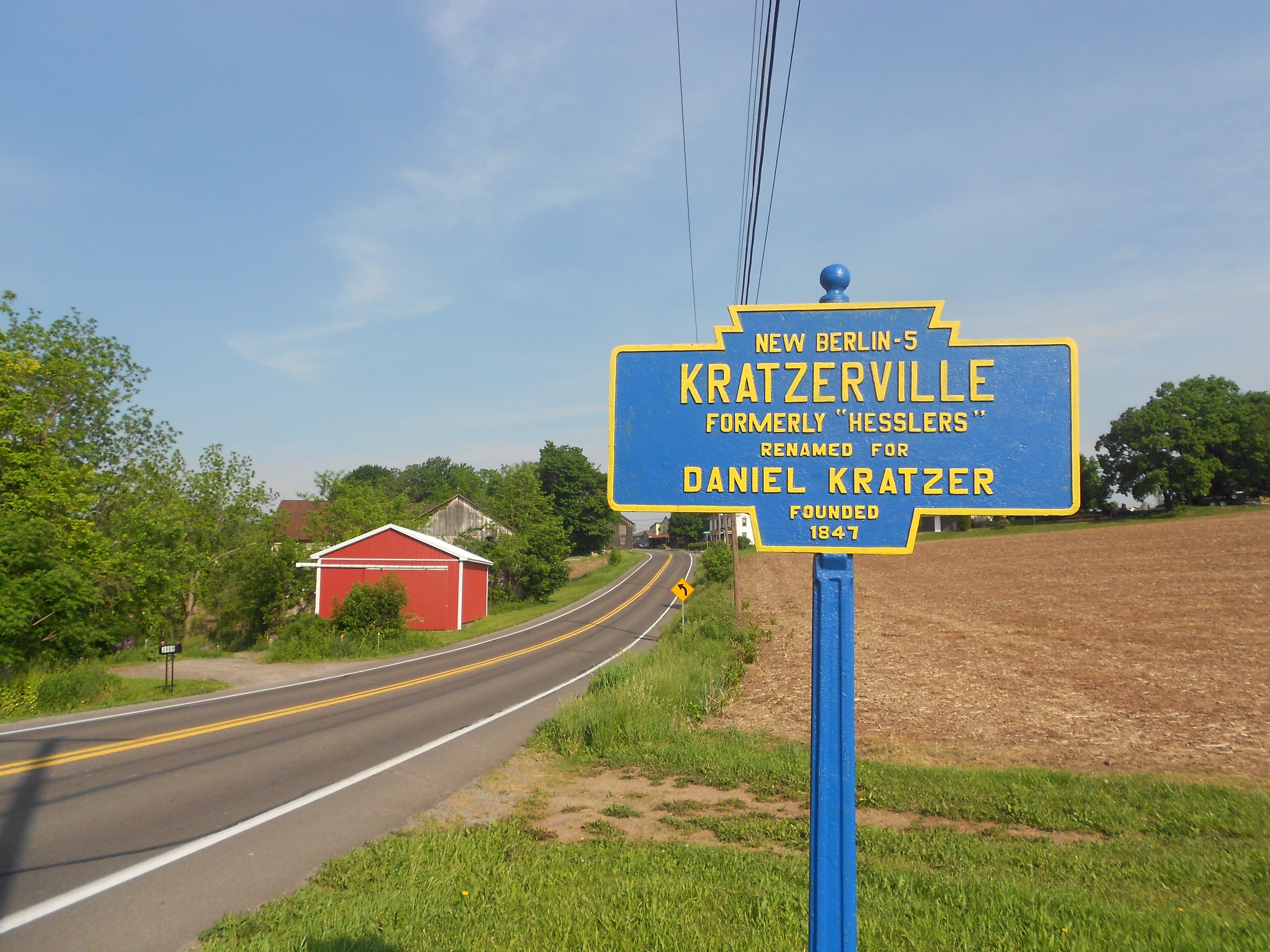
A good example of an original pole

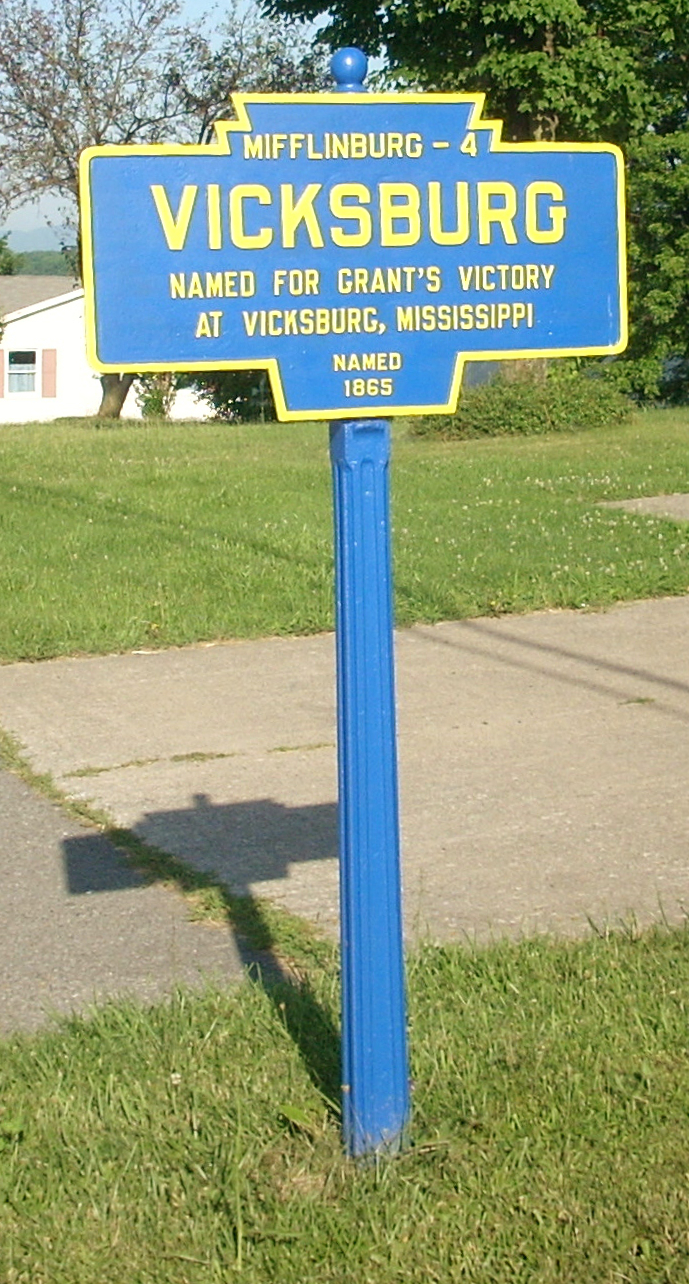
A full view of a restored Keystone Marker

Damaged or out of place

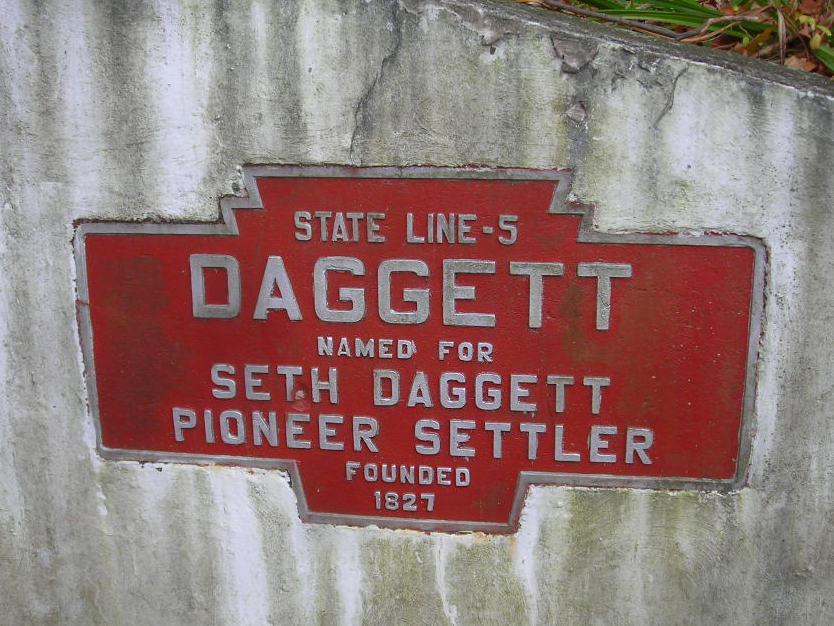
Keystone Marker for Daggett, Pennsylvania inlaid in cement wall

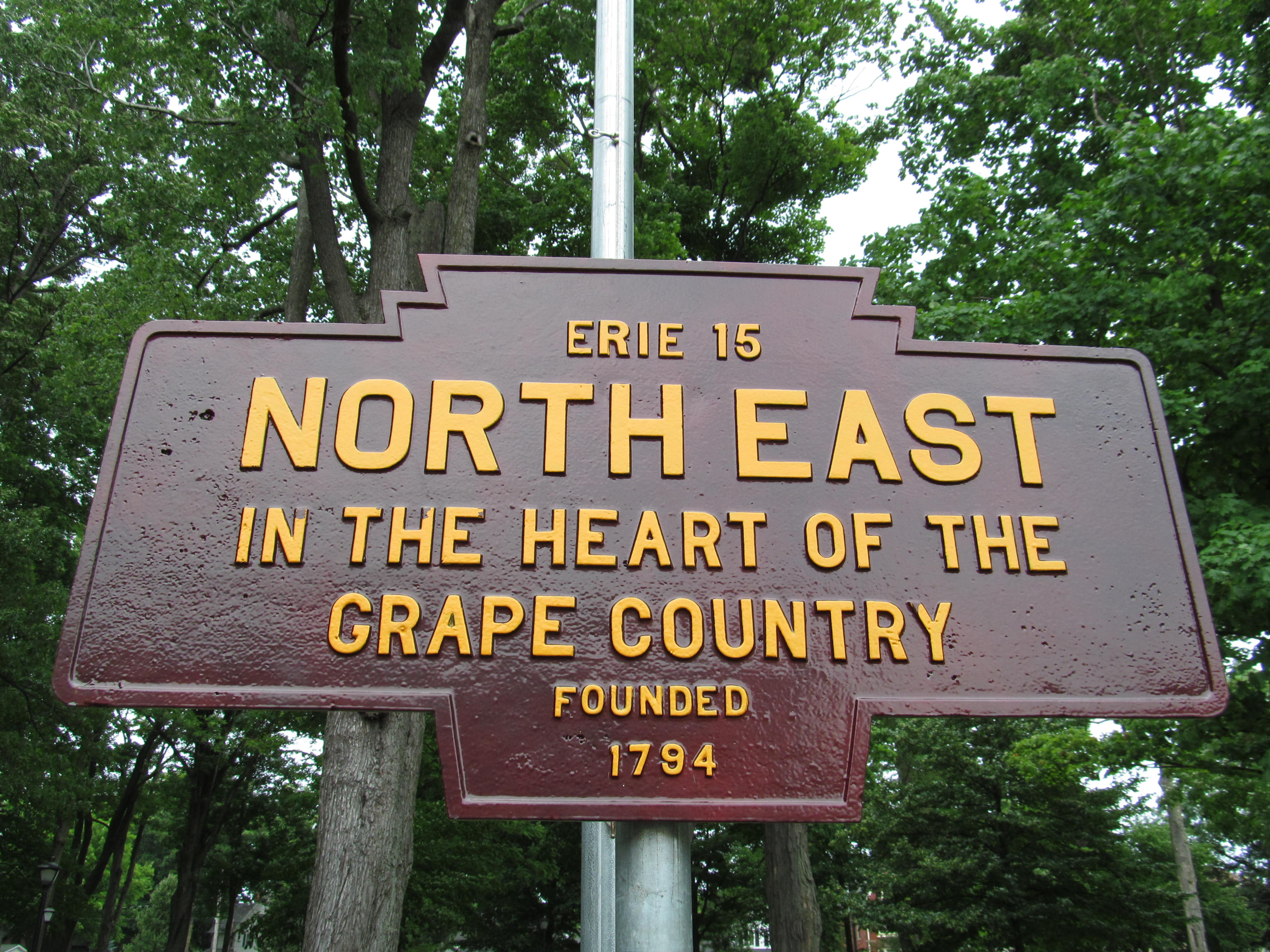
An atypical color scheme for a Keystone Marker in North East, Pennsylvania.

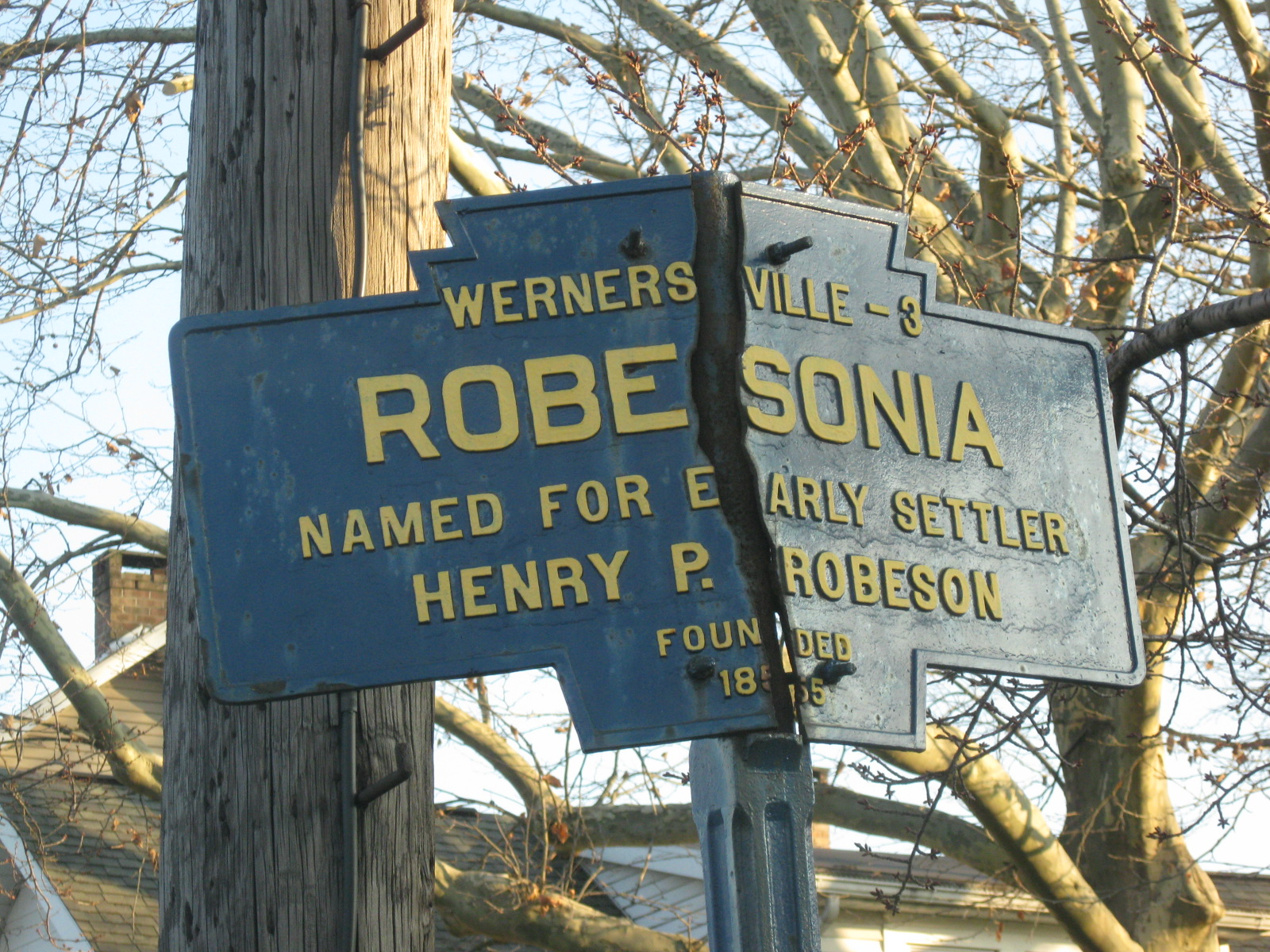
A Keystone Marker in serious need of repair from Robesonia, Pennsylvania.

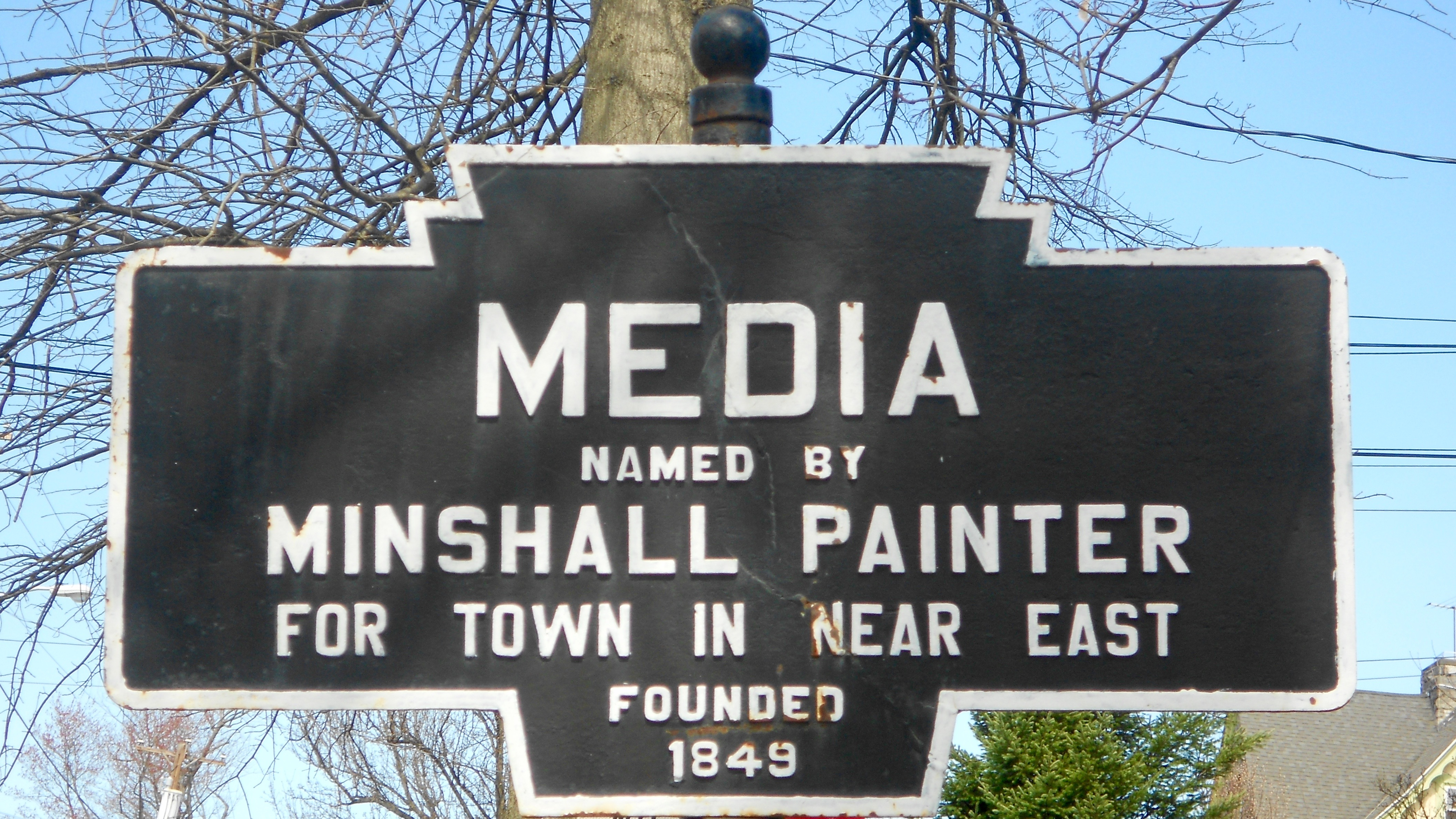
Atypical colors

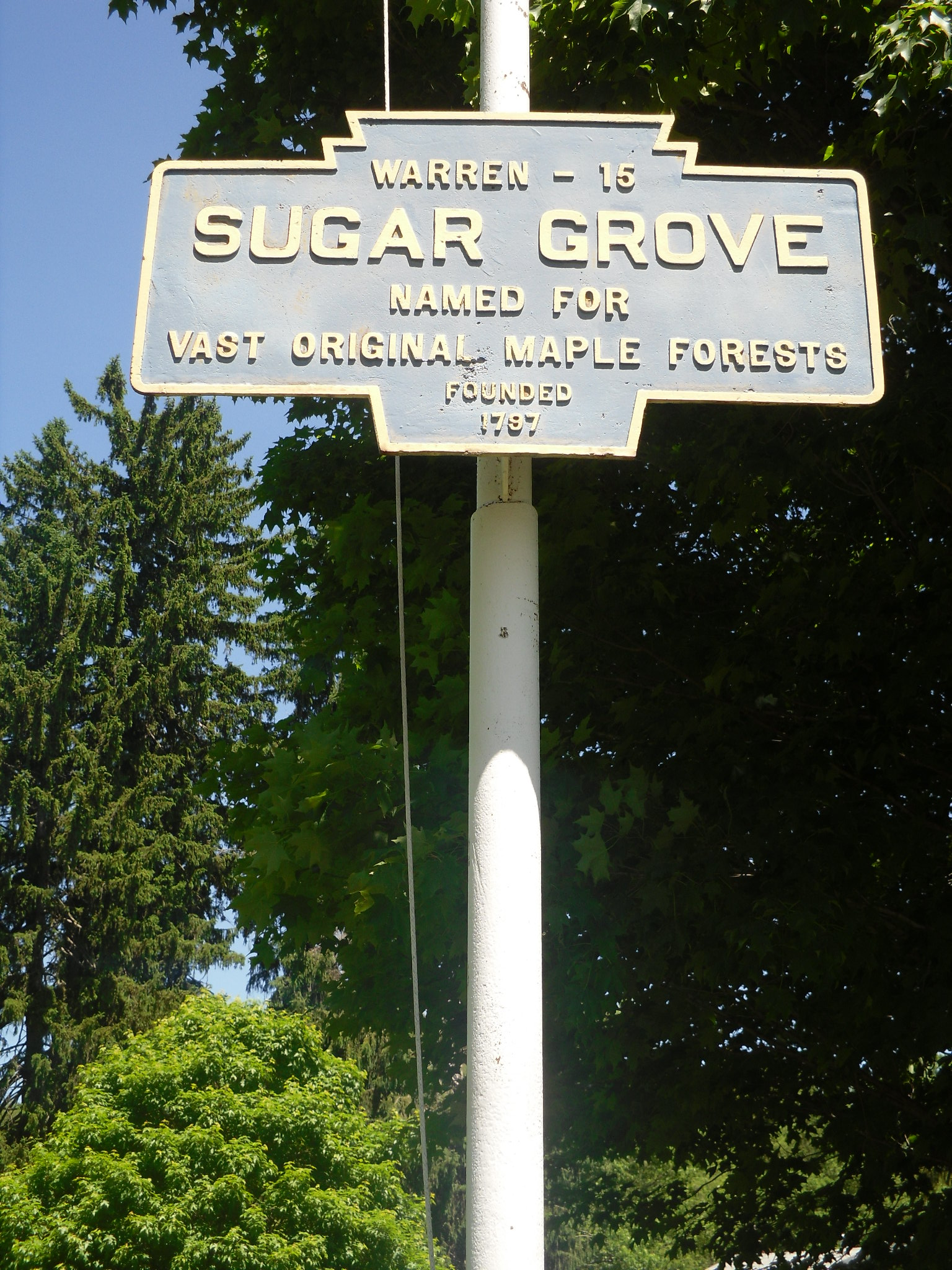
A Keystone Marker affixed to a flagpole

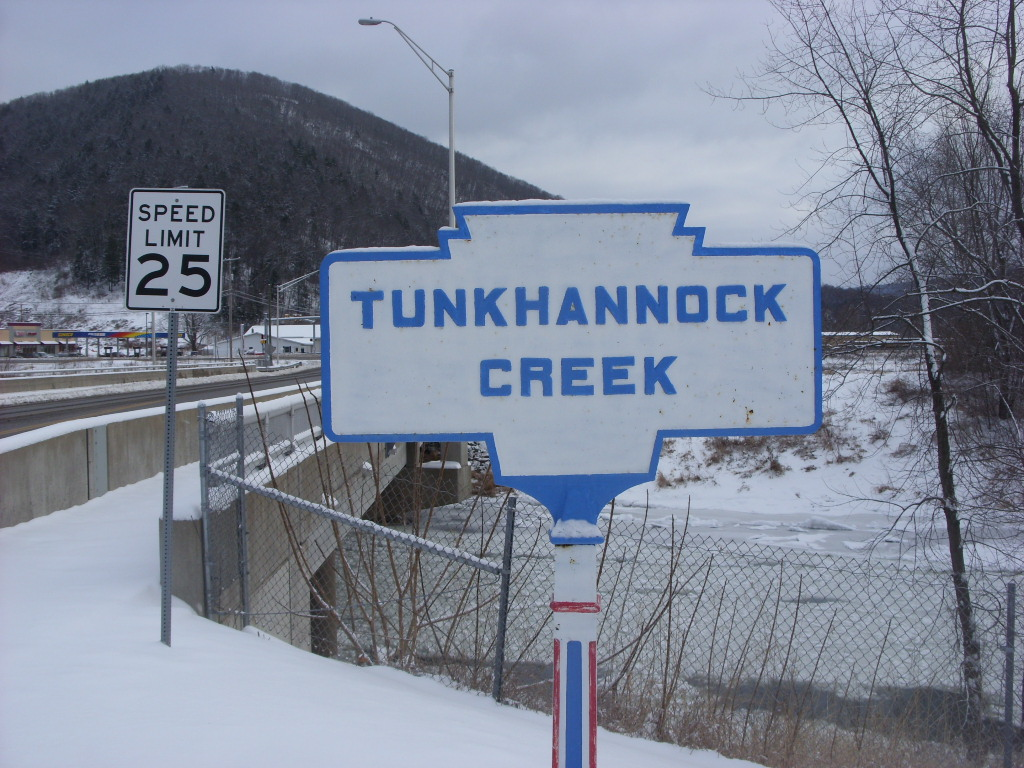
An example for a stream, rather than a settlement

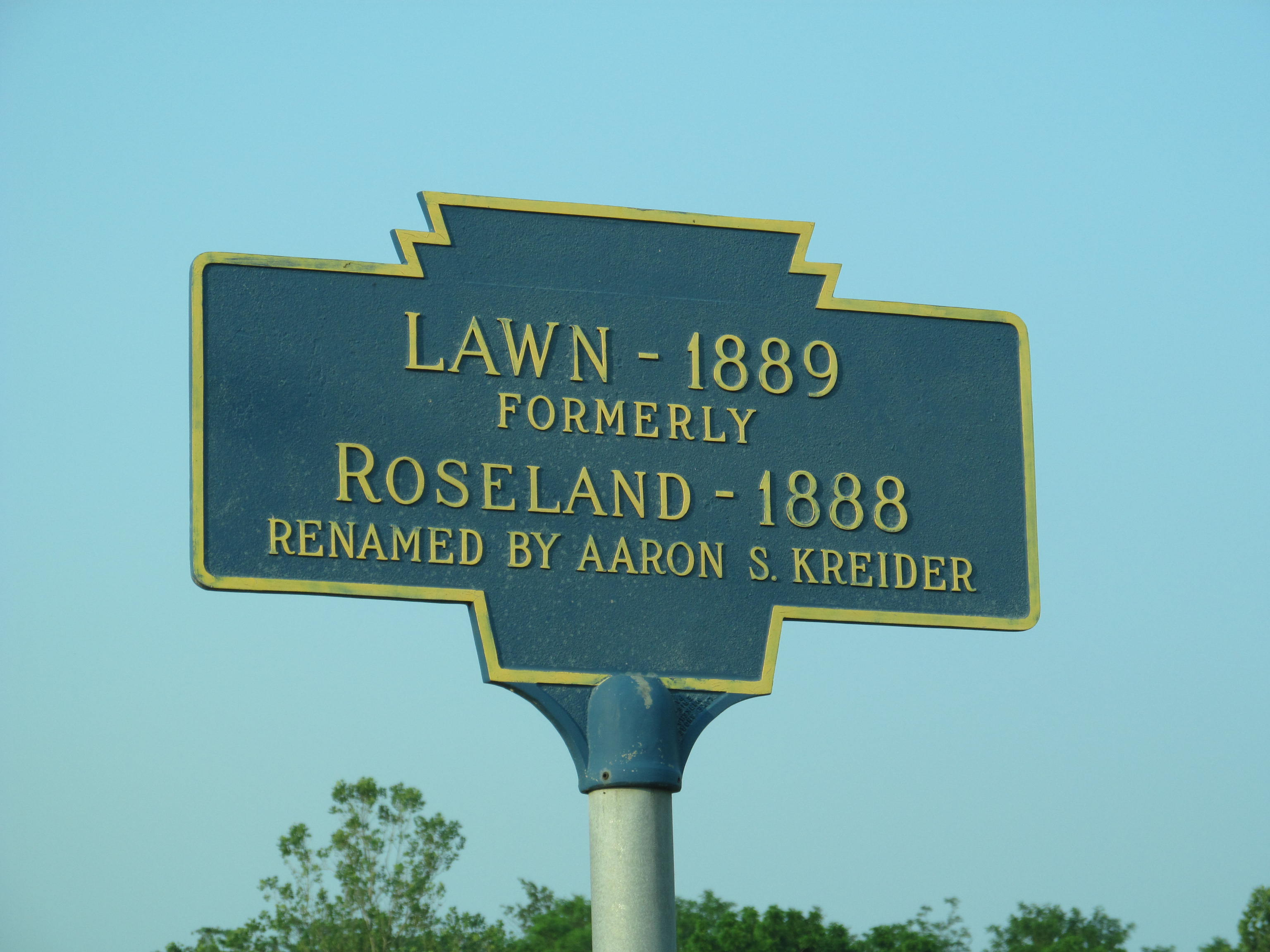
An atypical example

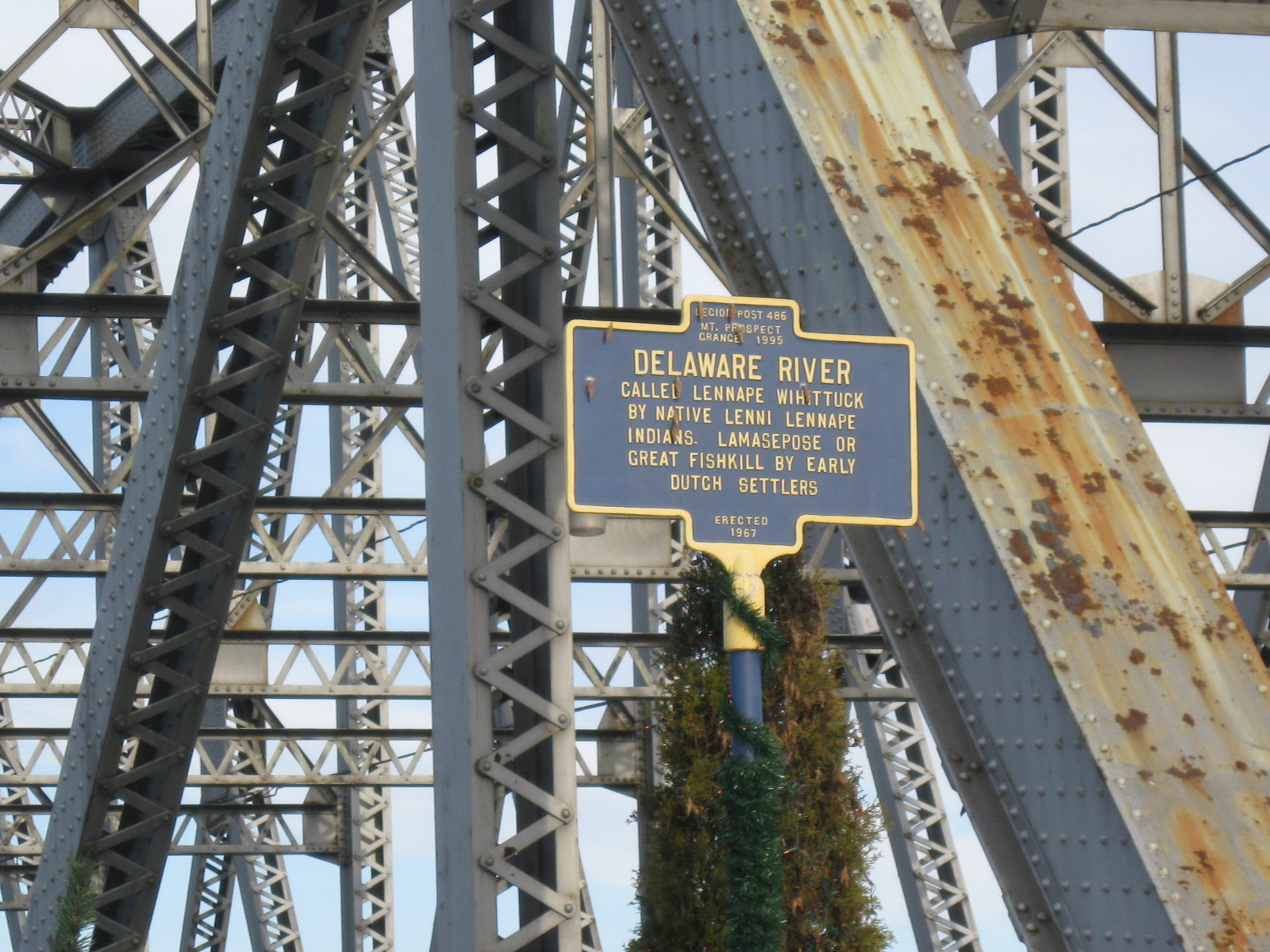
A lookalike
