= Pettey =

Pettey is a surname. Notable people with this surname include:

- Caroline Pettey, American TV reporter and beauty pageant titleholder
- Kyle Pettey (born 20th century), Canadian Paralympian athlete
- Pat Pettey (born 1946), American politician in Kansas
- Phil Pettey (born 1961), American football player
- Sarah Dudley Pettey (1869–1906), African-American educator etc.

== See also ==
- Anna Petteys (1892–1970), American education activist etc.
- Pettie, surname
- Petty (disambiguation), surname
