= Paul R. Greenough =

Paul R. Greenough is professor emeritus at the University of Iowa. He is a specialist in the history of modern India, and environmental and global health history. He was also chair of the Global Health Studies Program. He is the recipient of the Hancher-Finkbine Medallion.

== Selected publications ==
- Prosperity and Misery in Modern Bengal: The Famine of 1943-44. Oxford University Press, New York, 1982.
- Nature in the Global South: Environmental Projects in South and Southeast Asia, Duke University Press, 2003. (co-editor with Anna L. Tsing).
- Against Stigma: Comparing Caste and Race in an Era of Global Justice. Orient Black Swan, 2010.
- The Politics of Vaccination: A global history. Edited with Christine Holmberg and Stuart Blume, 2017. (Social Histories of Medicine) ISBN 978-1-5261-1088-6
