= W. Morgan Petty =

W. Morgan Petty is the creation of Brian Bethell. W. Morgan Petty would write crank letters to numerous organizations expressing typical concerns for mid-1980s Britain like nuclear war and the common market. Collections of his letters include:

- The Defence Diaries of W. Morgan Petty (1985) (Penguin: ISBN 0-14-007429-5; Random House: ISBN 0-394-73263-4)
- European Entries: the Common Market Papers of W. Morgan Petty (1986) (Penguin: ISBN 0-14-007671-9; Viking: ISBN 0-670-80360-X)

== See also ==
- Henry Root
