= Society for the Social History of Medicine =

- Abbreviation: SSHM
- Formation: 1970

The Society for the Social History of Medicine (SSHM) was established in 1970. It is known for its peer-reviewed journal Social History of Medicine (since 1988) and the three book series it has sponsored, Studies in the Social History of Medicine (1989-2009), Studies for the Society for the Social History of Medicine, and Social Histories of Medicine. Its first meeting and inaugural lecture was in May 1970.
