= Petite France =

Petite France may refer to

- Petite France, Gapyeong, a French themed cultural village set in Korea
- Petite France, Strasbourg, a historic quarter of the French city of Strasbourg

See also:

- Petty France (disambiguation)
