= Katherine Bitting =

Bacteriologist and food scientist

Katherine Golden Bitting
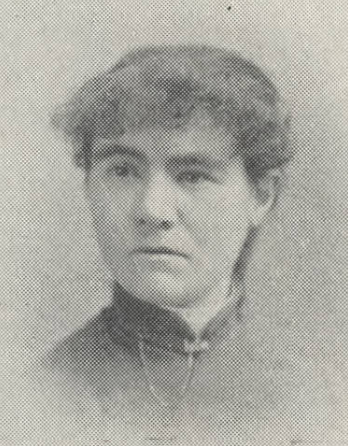
- Born: April 29, 1869; Stratford, Ontario, Canada
- Died: October 15, 1937 (aged 68); San Francisco, California, U.S.
- Education: Purdue University
- Known for: Food preservation
- Scientific career
- Fields: Chemistry
- Workplaces: United States Department of Agriculture

Katherine Golden Bitting (April 29, 1869 - October 15, 1937) was a food chemist for the United States Department of Agriculture, and the National Canners Association. She was a prolific author on the topic of food preservation. To facilitate her investigations, as the Annual Report of the Librarian of Congress (1940) states, she collected "materials on the sources, preparation, and consumption of foods, their chemistry, bacteriology, preservations, etc., from earliest times to the present day." She and her husband, Arvril Bitting, donated a significant collection of materials related to cookery to the Library of Congress. The Bitting Collection containing numerous English and American publications on food preparation from the eighteenth and nineteenth centuries and a sampling of notable French, German, and Italian works. Many modern food safety practices and techniques result directly from research conducted by the couple.

== Personal life ==
Katherine Bitting was born April 29, 1869, in Stratford, Ontario, Canada. Her family immigrated to Massachusetts in the United States when she was young. She married Arvill Wayne Bitting, a professor of veterinary science, cookery expert and author of several cookbooks. Katherine and Arvill Wayne Bitting formed a close partnership, working at the same institutions and collaborating on several publications.

== Education and early career ==
Bitting graduated from the Salem Normal School, now Salem State University, in 1886. From Purdue University, she earned a Bachelor of Science degree in 1890, a Master of Science in 1892, and a Doctor of Science in 1895. Bitting was an assistant botanist with the Purdue Agricultural Extension Station while completing her master's thesis. In 1893 she started working as an instructor at Purdue, teaching biology, structural botany, and bacteriology. She became an assistant professor of biology from 1901 to 1904.

== Career ==
In September 1907 Bitting was appointed as a microanalyst in the chemistry division of the US Department of Agriculture, Bureau of Chemistry, where she worked with Avril Bitting and gained expertise on food preservation and related topics, authoring nearly fifty pamphlets in that subject area. During her time at the Bureau of Chemistry, Katherine worked as a microbotanist. Her first job involved working with her husband to develop a method of producing ketchup without adding preservatives. To answer this question, the Bittings turned their Lafayette home into a ketchup factory, producing hundreds of bottles of the condiment. They collected ketchup samples from dozens of factories for analysis. Observing the samples and performing spoilage experiments, they determined that the addition of sugar and vinegar will prevent spoiling. Arvill Bitting published their findings under the title Experiments on the Spoilage of Tomato Ketchup in 1909. In 1915 two additional monographs were published. Ketchup Methods of Manufacturer and Microscopic. In the 1920s, the Bittings began working for the National Canners Association as microanalysts. They published Appertizing or, The Art of Canning in 1937. The apparent misspelling is a reference to Nicolas Appert, the French inventor of airtight food preservation.

=== Employment timeline ===
- 1890-1893: Assistant Botanist, Indiana Experiment Station.
- 1893-1901: Biology instructor, Purdue University.
- 1901-1904: Assistant professor of biology, Purdue University.
- 1907-1913: Microanalyst, Bureau of Chemistry, United States Department of Agriculture.
- 1913-1918: Technician, National Canners Association research laboratory in Washington D.C.
- 1919-1923: Bacteriologist, Glass Container Association.

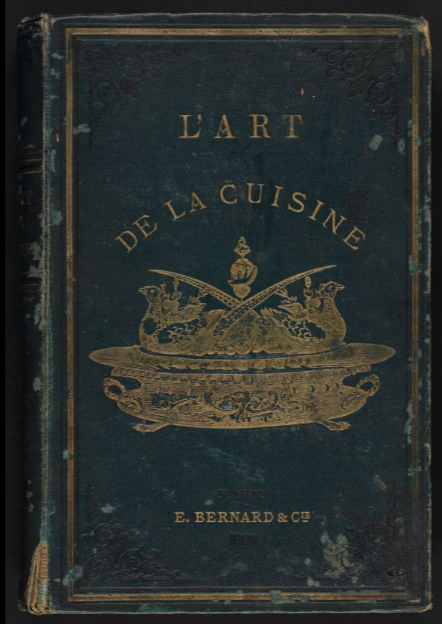
Cover of L'art de la Cuisine from the Katherine Golden Bitting Collection held at the Library of Congress

== Gastronomy collection ==
Her 4,346 volume collection of gastronomic literature from the fifteenth through twentieth centuries now resides at the Library of Congress's Rare Books and Special Collections Division. She amassed a large collection of materials in order: "To facilitate her investigations," as the Annual Report of the Librarian of Congress (1940) states, she collected "materials on the sources, preparation, and consumption of foods, their chemistry, bacteriology, preservations, etc., from earliest times to the present day." Curator Leonard N. Beck gave it a professional evaluation, pairing her collection with that of food writer Elizabeth Robins Pennell. The title, Two Loaf-Givers, refers to the Old English etymology of "lady"; a digital version is available.

In 1895, the Indiana Academy of Science appointed her as a fellow member.

== Bibliography ==
- Bitting, K. G., & Purdue University. (1896). Yeasts and Their Properties. Lafayette: Purdue University, Dept. of Biology.
- Bitting, K. G. (1896). On bread and Bread-Making. La Fayette, Ind: Purdue University.
- Bitting, K. G. (1897). Pure Yeast in Bread.
- Bitting, K. G., & National Canners Association. (1917). Deterioration in asparagus. Washington, D.C: Research Laboratory, National Canners Association.
- Bitting, K. G., & National Canners Association. (1917). Lye peeling. Washington, D.C: Research Laboratory, National Canners Association.
- Bitting, K. G. (1920). The effect of certain agents on the development of some moulds. Washington, D.C.: National capital Press.
- Bitting, K. G. (1920). The olive. Chicago, Ill: Glass Container Association of America.
- Bitting, K. G. (1924). Un Bienfaiteur De lIhumanité: [a tribute to M. Nicolas Appert]. United States: s.n..
- Bitting, K. G. (1939). Gastronomic bibliography. San Francisco, California.
