= Philip Petty =

American Civil War Medal of Honor recipient

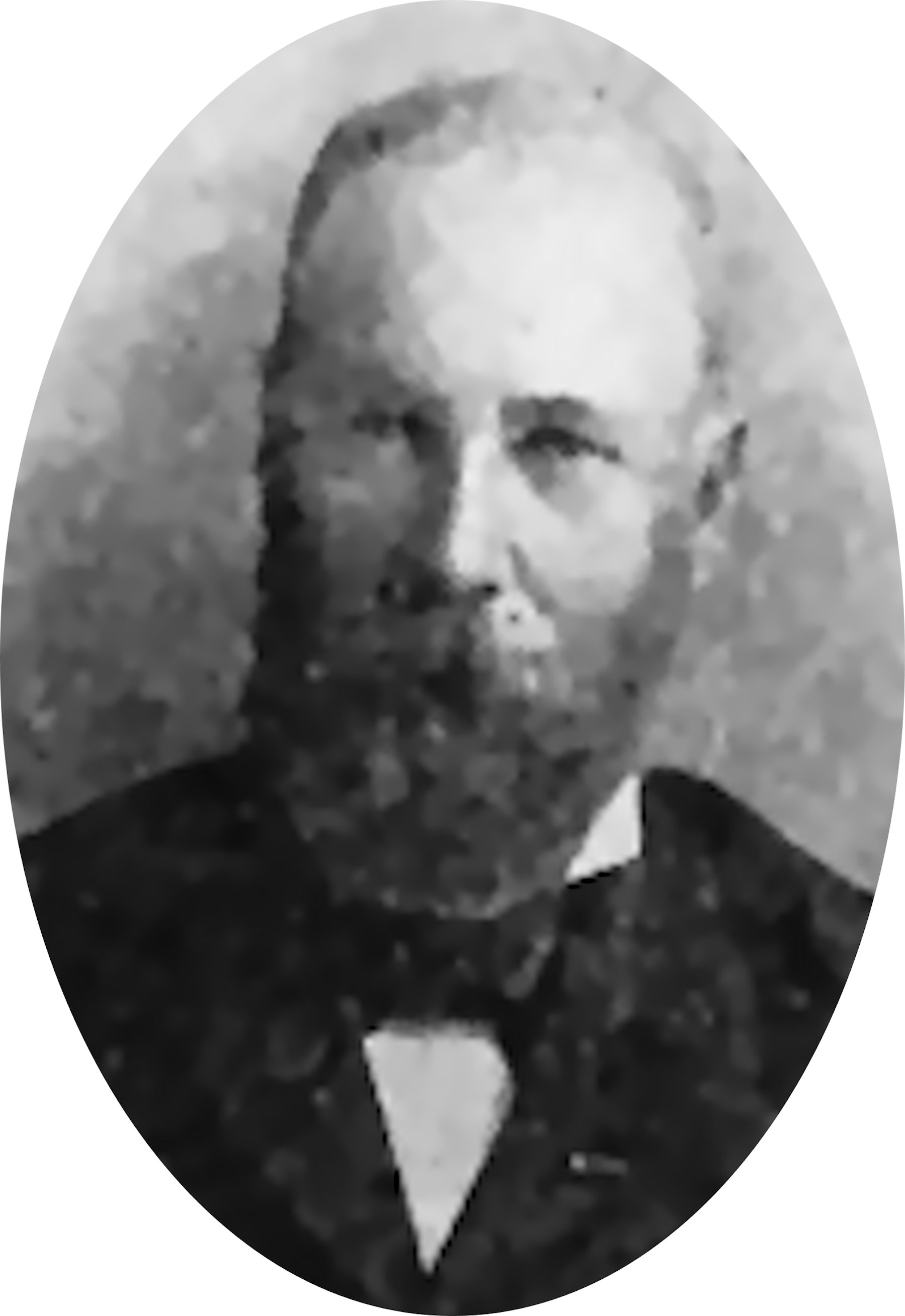
- Petty in 1875
- Born: May 15, 1840; Tingewick, England
- Died: December 22, 1917 (aged 77); Daggett, Pennsylvania, US
- Burial place: Daggett, Pennsylvania
- Military career
- Allegiance: United States of America
- Branch: United States Army
- Service years: 1861–1865
- Rank: Sergeant
- Units: Company A, 136th Pennsylvania Infantry
- Conflicts: American Civil War
- Awards: Medal of Honor

Philip Petty (May 15, 1840 – December 22, 1917) was a British American soldier who fought in the American Civil War. Petty received the Medal of Honor for his action in the Battle of Fredericksburg on December 13, 1862.

== Biography ==
Petty was born in Tingewick, England, on May 15, 1840. He moved to Pennsylvania and enlisted in the Union Army's 136th Pennsylvania Infantry Volunteers as a musician in August 1862. Shortly after enlisting, Petty took the position of a private in the infantry and joined a Company of his regiment. He received the Medal of Honor on August 21, 1893, for carrying the company's colors after the color bearer was wounded. Prior to the 20th century, colors were used to signal the movement of a military unit.

During the Battle of Fredericksburg, Petty and his regiment were slowly advancing through tall grass when they were caught up in enemy fire. The color bearer was wounded and dropped the colors, so Petty's commanding officer, a colonel, requested volunteers to carry the colors. Petty heeded the request by picking up the colors and continuing to advance with his fellow soldiers. An enemy counterattack pushed his regiment back and forced it to retreat. At one point during the retreat, Petty planted the colors and fired shots back at the enemy line. His commanding officer later told the regiment of what Petty did and he was given cheers and a promotion to color sergeant.

Petty raised horses in Daggett, Pennsylvania. He was awarded the Medal of Honor on August 21, 1893. Petty died on December 22, 1917.

== Medal of Honor citation ==
Citation: Took up the colors as they fell out of the hands of the wounded color bearer and carried them forward in the charge.

== See also ==
- List of Medal of Honor recipients
- List of American Civil War Medal of Honor recipients: M–P
