= Petty France =

Petty France may refer to

- Petty France, Gloucestershire, a hamlet in the English county of Gloucestershire
- Petty France, London, a street in London

See also:

- Petite France (disambiguation)
- Little France (disambiguation)
