= John Petty =

John Petty may refer to:

- John Petty (priest) (1935–2017), Anglican provost and Dean of Coventry
- John Petty (Primitive Methodist minister) (1807–1868), 19th-century author and Primitive Methodist minister and first governor of Elmfield College
- John Petty, 1st Earl of Shelburne (1706–1761), politician, father to former prime minister of Great Britain, William Petty, 2nd Earl of Shelburne
- John Petty, 2nd Marquess of Lansdowne (1765–1809), son of former prime minister of Great Britain, William Petty, 1st Marquess of Lansdowne
- John Petty Jr., (born 1998), American basketball player
- John Petty (American football), American football player

== See also ==
- John Pettie, Scottish painter
