= Steven Fielding (political historian) =

Steven Fielding (born 27 December 1961) is an academic in the School of Politics at the University of Nottingham where he is professor of political history and director of the Centre for British Politics. His most recent work A State of Play sets out the qualified constructivist view that how individuals regard real politics can be shaped by fictional works about politics.

== Career ==
The main theme of Fielding's research used to be the British Labour Party. His work The Labour Party: Continuity and Change in the Making of 'New' Labour (2003) presents a revisionist view of "New Labour" emphasising its continuity with earlier social democratic attempts to make the party electable within the confines of capitalism. He remains interested in the Labour Party and has used his work as the basis on which to critique Jeremy Corbyn's leadership. But he is now largely concerned with understanding the political culture of Britain as well as the United States and in working in a more overtly post-disciplinary manner.

Fielding is often asked to comment on political and historical matters in the British and international media; and has presented three documentaries for Radio 4's Archive Hour strand: Dramatising New Labour (2010); Very British Dystopias (2013) and Period Drama Politics (2016).

He co-hosts a monthly podcast called The Zeitgeist Tapes with political journalist Emma Burnell.

== Publications ==
- A State of Play: British Politics on Screen, Stage and Page, from Anthony Trollope to The Thick of It
- The Labour Governments 1964–1970: Labour and Cultural Change, Volume 1, Second Edition
- Interpreting the Labour Party: Approaches to Labour Politics and History (Critical Labour Movement Studies)
- The Labour Party: Continuity and Change in the Making of 'New' Labour
- Labour: Decline and Renewal
- The Labour Party: Socialism and Society Since 1951 (Documents in Contemporary History)
- England Arise: The Labour Party and popular politics in 1940s Britain
- The Wilson Governments, 1964-1970
- Workers' Worlds: Cultures and Communities in Manchester and Salford, 1880–1939
- Class and Ethnicity: Irish Catholics in England, 1880–1939 (Themes in the Twentieth Century)
