= Studies in the Social History of Medicine =

This is a list of books in the series Studies in the Social History of Medicine. The series was produced by the Society for the Social History of Medicine and Tavistock, later Routledge, between 1989 and 2009. It totalled 37 volumes.

== Titles ==
Titles in the series were:

- Andrews, Bridie, and Mary P. Sutphen (Eds.), Medicine and Colonial Identity (2003).
- Barry, Jonathan, and Colin Jones (Eds.), Medicine and Charity before the Welfare State (1991).
- Bashford, Alison, and Claire Hooker, Contagion (2001).
- Berridge, Virginia, and Kelly Loughlin, Medicine, the Market and the Mass Media: Producing health in the twentieth century (2006).
- Cooter, Roger, In the Name of the Child: Health and welfare, 1880–1940 (1992).
- Cunningham, Andrew, and Ole Peter Grell (Eds.), Health Care and Poor Relief in Protestant Europe, 1500–1700 (2004).
- Dale, Pamela, and Joseph Melling (Eds.), Mental Illness and Learning Disability since 1850: Finding a place for mental disorder in the United Kingdom (2006).
- Davidson, Roger, and Lesley A. Hall (Eds.), Sex, Sin and Suffering: Venereal disease and European society since 1870 (2001).
- De Barros, Juanita, Steven Palmer, and David Wright (Eds.), Health and Medicine in the circum-Caribbean, 1800–1968 (2009).
- Digby, Anne, and David Wright (Eds.), From Idiocy to Mental Deficiency: Historical perspectives on people with learning disabilities (1997).
- Elliot, Rosemary, Women and Smoking since 1890 (2008).
- Ernst, Waltraud, Histories of the Normal and the Abnormal: Social and cultural histories of norms and normativity (2008).
- Ernst, Waltraud, Plural Medicine, Tradition and modernity, 1800–2000 (2002). ISBN 0415231221
- Ernst, Waltraud, and Bernard Harris (Eds.), Race, Science and Medicine, 1700–1960 (1999).
- Forsythe, Bill, and Joseph Melling (Eds.), Insanity, Institutions and Society, 1800–1914: A social history of madness in comparative perspective (1999).
- Gijswit-Hofstra, Marijke, Hilary Marland and Hans de Waardt, Illness and Healing: Alternatives in Western Europe (2004).
- Gorsky, Martin and Sally Sheard (Eds.), Financing Medicine: The British Experience since 1750 (2007).
- Horden, Peregrine and Richard Smith (Eds.), The Locus of Care: Families, communities, institutions, and the provision of welfare since antiquity (1998).
- Jackson, Mark (ed.), Health and the Modern Home (2008).
- Johnson, Niall, Britain and the 1918–19 Influenza Pandemic: A dark epilogue (2006).
- Jones, Colin, and Roy Porter (Eds.), Reassessing Foucault: Power, medicine and the body (1994).
- Killingray, David, and Howard Phillips (Eds.), The Spanish Influenza Pandemic of 1918–19: New perspectives (2003).
- Marland, Hilary, and Anne Marie Rafferty (Eds.), Midwives, Society and Childbirth: Debates and controversies in the modern period (1998).
- Marks, Lara, and Michael Worboys (Eds.), Migrants, Minorities and Health: Historical and contemporary studies (1997).
- McGann, Susan, and Barbara Mortimer (Eds.), New Directions in Nursing History (2005).
- Melling, Joseph, and Bill Forsythe, The Politics of Madness: The state, insanity and society in England, 1845–1914 (2006).
- Moran, James, Leslie Topp and Jonathan Andrews (Eds.), Madness, Architecture and the Built Environment: Psychiatric spaces in historical context (2007).
- Pelling, Margaret, and Richard M. Smith (Eds.), Life, Death and the Elderly: Historical perspectives (1994).
- Phillips, Jim, and David F. Smith (Eds.), Food, Science, Policy and Regulation in the Twentieth Century: International and comparative perspectives (2001).
- Sauerteig, Lutz, and Roger Davidson (ed.), Shaping Sexual Knowledge: A cultural history of sex education in twentieth-century Europe (2009).
- Schlich, Thomas, and Ulrich Tröhler (ed.), The Risks of Medical Innovation: Risk perception and assessment in historical context (2006).
- Smith, David, Nutrition in Britain: Science, scientists and politics in the twentieth century (1997).
- Smith, Leonard, Lunatic Hospitals in Georgian England, 1750–1830 (2007).
- Stanton, Jenny (ed.), Innovations in Health and Medicine: Diffusion and resistance in the Twentieth Century (2004).
- Sturdy, Steve (ed.), Medicine, Health and the Public Sphere in Britain, 1600–2000 (2003).
- Sweet, Helen M., and Rona Dougall (Eds.), Community Nursing and Primary Healthcare in Twentieth-Century Britain (2008)
- Turner, David M., and Kevin Stagg (Eds.), Social Histories of Disability and Deformity: Bodies, images and experiences (2007).
