= The Finders (movement) =

Intentional community founded in Washington, D.C.

- Formation: c. 1971
- Founder: Marion Pettie
- Dissolved: c. 2003
- Type: Intentional community
- Headquarters: Washington, D.C. Madison County, Virginia

The Finders were an intentional community and new religious movement founded in Washington, D.C. and Virginia in the late 1960s by former United States Air Force master sergeant Marion Pettie. They believed in New Age and eastern religious ideas, particularly Taoism.

The Finders came to wider public attention in 1987 with the arrest of two members for misdemeanor child abuse, leading to accusations that the group was a satanic cult, an international pedophile ring, or a kidnapping ring run by the Central Intelligence Agency.

== Background ==
=== Marion David Pettie ===
Marion David Pettie was born in 1920. He was an officer in the United States Air Force, attaining the rank of master sergeant and retiring in 1956, after which he did little formal work. According to a 1993 interview of Pettie by U.S. News & World Report, his wife once worked for the Central Intelligence Agency, and his son, George Pettie, worked for Air America, a covert CIA front. Pettie referred to himself as "the Stroller."

According to a 1987 Washington Post interview with George Pettie, his father became a "student of the world" during the 1960s and would spend his time in the library near their family farm. He described Marion Pettie as having "a keen sense of what people need that they don't even know themselves." Around 1971, Pettie gathered his followers for a meeting at his house in the Glover Park neighborhood of Washington, D.C., which George Pettie described as "the beginning of a new life" for his father and his followers. "They found in their communal lifestyle a more adventurous life."

As of 1987, George Pettie owned a home inspection business in Northern Virginia and broke contact with his father in 1985.

=== Properties ===
The Petties had a 90-acre farm in Nethers, Virginia near Shenandoah National Park on the road to Old Rag Mountain, known as the Pettie Farm or simply The Farm. As early as 1968, members of the American counterculture came to The Farm. In 1987, at least four visitors to The Farm between 1968 and 1973 recalled it as a place where "anyone could get an organic meal without charge, without questions." According to a 2021 letter by Virginia author Terry Alford, Pettie was "very welcoming" and surrounded by devoted friends "attracted by his intelligent and questing nature," including anarcho-capitalist Karl Hess. Pettie was also described by visitors as a "charismatic and wealthy man" in his forties.

Pettie and his followers also had a house at 3920 W Street NW in the Glover Park neighborhood of Washington, D.C. The house consisted of two attached red brick buildings, each with four apartments. They lived there until 1987 and occasionally distributed flyers advertising shared rooms for as little as $5 per night, according to a temporary resident.

In addition to the farm and house, the group owned a warehouse at 1307 Fourth Street NE, Washington.

== Beliefs ==
The belief systems of the group were kept secret from outsiders. The group's beliefs were eclectic and sourced from a variety of traditions; they combined eastern religion, especially Taoism, with New Age and Human Potential Movement concepts. Pettie developed his initial views on the works of Carlos Castaneda, who researched mystic self-exploration in the 1960s and had "a consuming interest in the future," leading cult experts to identify futurism as a major component of the Finders' philosophy. In 1996, Pettie described himself as a skeptic, saying that he did not "believe or disbelieve things."

By the 1980s, members tended to be young adults, well-educated, professional, and secretive. According to George Pettie, they tended to be professionals who had dropped out of careers and secured temporary work in Washington D.C. They were opposed to permanent employment as an obstacle to "spontaneity." According to neighbors of the Pettie farm, visitors to the farm began wearing business suits and professional clothing around 1982, replacing the hippie culture which had previously predominated.

Some time before 1987, the group was segregated by sex, with women living at the Glover Park house, while the men moved into the Fourth Street warehouse.

=== Child rearing ===
In 1980, the group radically changed their child rearing practices to raise a generation of "toughened" children. To replicate what they believed was the original method of living of Native Americans, the children were raised communally instead of by their parents.

According to George Pettie, the group operated as "an extended family" of people who were "under his father's sway." Members shared parental responsibility for children, in order to allow Pettie to send them on "adventures" to teach them about themselves. Pettie would identify a character flaw in a member and send them away. On their return, they would describe the "lesson" they learned to other members. During this time, they would not see their biological children for months, and the children would be collectively cared for by other members. The children were not enrolled in school.

Neighbors reported seeing children at both the Madison County farm and the Glover Park home. During the summers, as many as a dozen children lived on the farm, and neighbors reported "hollering and screaming ... about Momma and Daddy." Neighbors to the Glover Park home reported that "the children often went without clothes in the summer" and at least one report was made to police regarding a child who was screaming for more than an hour."

According to Pettie, members of the group pooled their money.

== Controversy and criminal investigations ==
Before 1987, the Finders were rarely subject to complaints regarding noise, and guests reported no signs of odd behavior or mistreatment of children. In 1982, a police complaint was filed against the group which led to an investigation that concluded there was no criminal activity.

In December 1986, Washington, D.C. police found an ornate tombstone and round stones gathered near a circle about 70 yards behind the Glover Park house.

=== 1987 child abuse investigation ===
The group came to national public attention in February 1987, when two male members, Douglas Ammerman and James Michael Holwell, were arrested in Tallahassee, Florida for misdemeanor child abuse. The two men were accompanied by six children and, when questioned by police as to their identities and relationships with the children, remained silent. Police reports described Ammerman and Holwell as "well-dressed men in suits" and the children as "scruffy" and "hungry," varying in age between 2 and 11. The children were also described as being covered in insect bites and unwashed.

After the arrests, law enforcement issued a nationwide search for the children's parents, with a focus on Kentucky and San Francisco.

Contemporary newspaper accounts accused The Finders of being a satanic cult, an international pedophile ring, or a kidnapping ring organized by the CIA. According to U.S. district court records, a confidential police source had previously told authorities that the Finders were "a cult" that conducted "brainwashing" techniques. The warehouse and Glover Park house were both raided by law enforcement. The source claimed to have been recruited by the group with promises of "financial reward and sexual gratification" and of being invited by one member to "explore" satanism with them. Police sources and U.S. Customs Service officials said that the material seized in the raids included photos of children engaged in "cult rituals," including ceremonial bloodletting of animals, and one photograph of a child in chains.

Robert Gardner Terrell, who came forward as the owner of one of the raided properties, claimed, "We are rational people ... not devil worshipers or child molesters," and "anything we've done is based on the desire for the children to have the richest life they could have." According to Terrell, recovered photos of naked children were of Holwell's own children, and the "bloodletting" photographs were of already-butchered goats, with the children being taught how to prepare them.

The men were released six weeks later, with the state of Florida dropping all charges against them. Federal authorities concluded that there was no evidence of criminal activity. The authorities contacted the mothers of the children, who came to Tallahassee and retrieved them.

The 1987 investigation received wider attention in 1993, when Henry T. "Skip" Clements, an officer in private-sector consulting and a resident of Stuart, Florida, obtained a copy of a report which stated that the Washington, D.C. police investigation into the Finders had been dropped as a "CIA internal matter." Clements alleged that the Central Intelligence Agency had compelled the Customs Service to cease their 1987 investigation because the commune was used as a front to train agents. Clements' allegations drew the interest of two U.S. representatives, Tom Lewis and Charlie Rose, leading to a Department of Justice investigation. The CIA denied any involvement, and CIA spokesman David Christian asserted that the 1993 accusations were a misunderstanding stemming from a CIA training contractor, Future Enterprises Inc. where one Finders member worked as a part-time accountant.

== Later history ==
After the allegations were dropped the group took a lower profile. In 1996, Pettie appeared in court to declare that he did not know the location of a briefcase containing about $2 million worth of the Finders' land deeds of gift. He said it was kept by other members of the group. Former members of the group claimed that the group had been dissolved and that the assets were held by Pettie; he denied this.

As of 1999, the group still existed. Academic Timothy Miller, as part of his investigation into 1960s counterculture communes, noted that "The Finders [...] seems to delight in not giving out information (or at least accurate information) about itself and is similarly veiled in mystery."

Pettie died on October 24, 2003.

In 2019, the Federal Bureau of Investigation released hundreds of documents related to The Finders, noting on the FBI Vault website that it was their most requested topic. The Finders have been described as an example of the Satanic panic in the United States, and some authors have described the conspiracy theories regarding the 1987 sexual abuse investigation as the origin of other conspiratorial beliefs regarding United States intelligence services complicity in child sexual abuse.
