= Journal of Victorian Culture =

The Journal of Victorian Culture is a quarterly academic journal of cultural history. Established in 1996 and published by Oxford University Press, it tries to promote the best work on all aspects of nineteenth-century society, culture, and the material world including: literature, art, performance, politics, science, medicine, technology, lived experience, and ideas. The journal welcomes submissions, which address a broad Victorian studies readership and explore new questions and approaches. Concerned with the long nineteenth century, its legacies, and echoes in the present day, the journal encourages articles which interrogate periodization, historiography and critical traditions.

The Journal of Victorian Culture's editors are Trev Broughton (University of York), Nancy Henry (University of Tennessee, Knoxville), Alastair Owens (Queen Mary University of London), and Jane Hamlett (Royal Holloway, University of London). The Journal of Victorian Culture is also supported by a vibrant online supplement, which is edited by Lucinda Matthews-Jones (Liverpool John Moores University).
