= Social History (journal) =

- Discipline: Sociology and history
- Language: English
- Edited by: Louise Jackson and Gordon Johnston

Publication details
- History: 1976–present
- Publisher: Taylor and Francis (United Kingdom)
- Frequency: Quarterly

Standard abbreviations
- ISO 4: Soc. Hist.

Indexing
- CODEN: SOHSEH
- ISSN: 0307-1022 (print); 1470-1200 (web)
- LCCN: 78643875
- JSTOR: 03071022
- OCLC no.: 859650578

Links
- Journal homepage; Online access; Online archive; Ingenta connect archive

Social History is a quarterly peer-reviewed academic journal of social history published by Routledge. It was established in 1976. The editors-in-chief are Louise Jackson and Gordon Johnston (University of Edinburgh). Issues from 1976 until 2012 are available on JSTOR.

== Abstracting and indexing ==
The journal is abstracted and indexed in:

- America: History and Life
- British Humanities Index
- CSA Worldwide Political Science Abstracts
- Historical Abstracts
- International Bibliography of the Social Sciences
- ProQuest databases
- Scopus
- Sociological Abstracts
- Studies on Women and Gender Abstracts
- Arts & Humanities Citation Index.
