= Catherine Clarke (academic) =

British historian and academic

Professor Catherine Clarke FRHistS
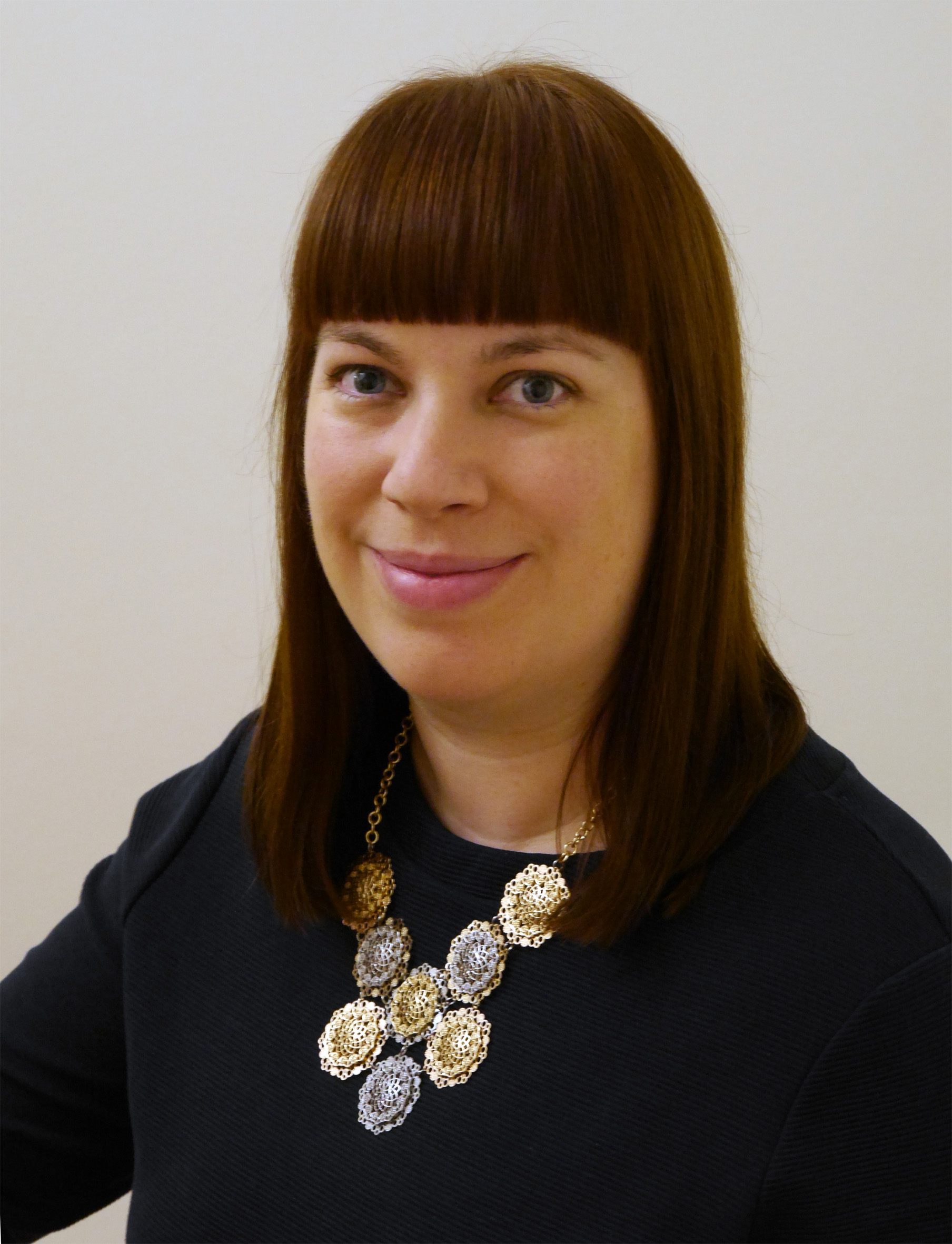
- Born: Catherine A. M. Clarke
- Occupations: Historian and academic
- Title: Professor of the History of People, Place and Community

Academic background
- Education: University of Oxford (BA); University of Reading (MA); King's College London (PhD)
- Thesis: The Locus Amoenus in Old English: Guthlac A and its Cultural Context (2003)
- Doctoral advisor: Clare Lees; Jane Roberts

Academic work
- Discipline: English studies; History
- Institutions: Swansea University; University College, Oxford; University of Southampton; Institute of Historical Research

Catherine A. M. Clarke FRHistS is a British academic. She serves as the Chair in the History of People, Place and Community at the Institute of Historical Research, School of Advanced Study, University of London, where she is Director of the Centre for History of People, Place and Community and Director of the Victoria County History. She is a specialist in the Middle Ages and has published on power, place and identity in medieval Britain.

== Education ==
Clarke received her BA from the University of Oxford in 1998 and her MA from the University of Reading in 1999. She earned her PhD in 2003 from the Department of English at King's College, London. Her doctoral thesis was titled The Locus Amoenus in Old English: Guthlac A and its Cultural Context. Clare Lees and Jane Roberts served as Clarke's doctoral supervisors.

== Career ==
Clarke taught at Swansea University and University College, Oxford, and was appointed to a personal chair at the English Department of the University of Southampton in 2012, where she remains a visiting professor. She was appointed chair at the Institute of Historical Research, University of London, in 2019; within this role she is Director of the Victoria County History, a national project founded in 1899 to write the history of English counties.

Clarke has led major Arts and Humanities Research Council-funded projects on medieval places and their interpretation, such as "City Witness: Place and Perspective in Medieval Swansea". Her project "The St Thomas Way" developed a new heritage route from Swansea to Hereford, inspired by medieval pilgrimage.

In 2016 Clarke delivered the Denys Hay Lecture at the University of Edinburgh: 'Place machines: memory, imagination and the medieval city'. She is the Director of CARMEN: The Worldwide Medieval Network, and programme coordinator for Anglo-Saxon Studies at the annual Leeds International Medieval Congress. She previously held a Visiting Fellowship at the Lilly Library, Indiana University Bloomington.

Clarke has written for The Conversation and appeared on Channel Four historical documentaries.

== Bibliography ==
- The St Thomas Way and the Medieval March of Wales: Exploring Place, Heritage, Pilgrimage, edited by Catherine Clarke (ARC Humanities Press, 2020)
- Medieval Cityscapes Today, edited by Catherine Clarke (ARC Humanities Press, 2019)
- Writing Power in Anglo-Saxon England: Texts, Hierarchies, Economies (Woodbridge: Boydell Press, 2012)
- Mapping the Medieval City: Space, Place and Identity in Chester c.1200–1600 (Cardiff: University of Wales Press, 2011)
- Literary Landscapes and the Idea of England, 700–1400 (Cambridge: D. S. Brewer, 2006)
