= Jo Fox =

British historian

Jo Fox FRHistS FRSA
- Born: Joanne Clare Fox
- Occupations: Historian, academic administrator
- Awards: FRHistS, FRSA

Academic background
- Education: University of Kent (BA, PhD)

Academic work
- Discipline: History
- Sub-discipline: History of film, history of propaganda
- Institutions: Durham University, University of London, Newcastle University

Joanne Clare Fox is a British historian specialising in the history of film and propaganda in twentieth-century Europe.

== Education ==
Joanne Clare Fox graduated with BA and PhD degrees in history from the University of Kent.

== Career ==
Before becoming a university lecturer, Fox intended to use her historical training to work in heritage, but changed her mind after a student at Kent told her, "you have been an inspiration to all of us! You should be teaching!"

Fox entered academia as a lecturer at Durham University in 1999, later becoming professor of modern history, and the first female professor in Durham's history department, in 2010 and then the first female head of the history department in 2016.

In 2007, Fox was appointed a National Teaching Fellow. She is also a member of the Council for the International Association of Media and History and is on the editorial board of their academic journal, The Historical Journal of Film, Radio and Television. She is the honorary director of communications for the Royal Historical Society. Elected a Fellow of the Royal Historical Society (FRHistS), she is also a Fellow of the Royal Society of Arts (FRSA).

Her interest in using new learning technologies influenced others within Durham University, and in other institutions. Notably, she contributed a case study to the National Blackboard Conference, chaired by Lord Dearing.

Fox's most significant published work is Film Propaganda in Britain and Nazi Germany: World War II (2007), in which she compares the use of cinema in propaganda in Britain and Germany in the Second World War.

In 2018, Fox was appointed director of the Institute of Historical Research at the School of Advanced Study, University of London (the institutes's first female director). She then became dean of the School of Advanced Study and the University of London's pro vice chancellor for research and public engagement in 2020.

In 2025, Fox moved to Newcastle University as pro-vice-chancellor for humanities and social sciences.

== Media appearances ==
Fox appeared as an expert for some episodes of the 2010 CBC Television documentary, Love, Hate & Propaganda. She appeared as an expert on the BBC Radio 4 programme Making History in March 2011 to discuss satire and anti-fascist propaganda, and on The One Show in May 2011 to discuss public and media reactions to Rudolf Hess's 1941 parachute landing.

== Published works ==
=== Monographs ===
- Filming Women in the Third Reich Oxford; New York : Berg, 2000. ISBN 978-1-85973-396-7
  - Review, German Quarterly . German Quarterly, Winter, 2003, vol. 76, no. 1, p. 121-122.
  - Review, Historical Journal of Film, Radio and Television Oct 2001 v21 i4 p417
  - Review, Historical Journal of Film, Radio and Television Oct 2005 v25 i4 p647(7)
  - Review, CHOICE: Current Reviews for Academic Libraries July–August 2001 v38 i11-12 p1968(1)
  - Review, Times Higher Education Supplement 2 March 2001 i1476 p30(1)
- Film Propaganda in Britain and Nazi Germany: World War II ) Oxford; New York : Berg, 2007. ISBN 978-1-85973-891-7
  - Review, American Historical Review April 2008 v113 i2 p567(2)
  - Review, Historical Journal of Film, Radio and Television March 2008 v28 i1 p80(3)
  - Review, CHOICE: Current Reviews for Academic Libraries Oct 2007 v45 i2 p288(2)

=== Other works ===
- '"Heavy hands and light touches": approaches to the study of cinematic culture in the Third Reich', History Compass 1 (2003)
- 'Resistance and the Third Reich', Journal of Contemporary History 39 (2004)
- 'Winston Churchill and the "men of destiny": reflections on leadership and the role of the Prime Minister in the British wartime feature films', in Richard Toye & Julie Gottlieb (eds.), Making Reputations: Power, Persuasion and the Individual in Modern British Politics (2005)
- '"The mediator": images of radio in wartime feature film in Britain and Germany', in Mark Connelly & David Welch (eds.), War and the Media. Reportage and Propaganda 1900-2003 (2005)
- 'John Grierson, his "documentary boys" and the British Ministry of Information, 1939-1942', Historical Journal of Film, Radio and Television 25 (2005)
- 'Millions Like Us? Accented Language and the "Ordinary" in British Films of the Second World War', Journal of British Studies 45 (2006)
- 'German cinema and the United Kingdom, 1933-45', in Roel Vande Winkel & David Welch (eds.), Cinema and the Swastika: The International Expansion of the Third Reich Cinema (2007)
- 'A thin stream issuing through closed lock gates' : German cinema and the United Kingdom, 1933-45 in Winkel, Roel Vande, and David Welch. Cinema and the Swastika: The International Expansion of Third Reich Cinema. Basingstoke [England]: Palgrave Macmillan, 2007.
- '"Everyday Heroines": Heroic motherhood in Nazi film - Mutterliebe (1939) and Annelie (1941)', Historical Reflections/Réflexions Historiques 35 (2009)
- "Jana F. Bruns. Nazi Cinema's New Women".The American Historical Review 115, no. 4: 1240-.(2010)
- 'Propaganda and the Flight of Rudolf Hess, 1941-45', Journal of Modern History 83 (2011)

Preceded by Professor Lawrence Goldman	Director, Institute of Historical Research; 2018–2020	Succeeded by Professor Claire Langhamer
Preceded by Professor Rick Rylance	Dean, SAS, University of London; 2020–2025	Succeeded by Professor Claire Gorrara
