= Margit Symo =

German actress

Margit Symo (13 September 1913 – 6 October 1992) was a Hungarian-born German actress. She was married to the composer Willy Mattes, with whom she had a daughter Eva Mattes.

== Selected filmography ==
- Gypsy Blood (1934)
- A Night on the Danube (1935)
- Autobus S (1937)
- The Yellow Flag (1937)
- The Ways of Love Are Strange (1937)
- Not a Word About Love (1937)
- The Irresistible Man (1937)
- Carmen, la de Triana (1938)
- Nights in Andalusia (1938)
- Flower of the Tisza (1939)
- Between River and Steppe (1939)
- Der Postmeister (1940)
- The Thing About Styx (1942)
- To Be God One Time (1942)
- An Old Heart Becomes Young Again (1943)
- The Little Town Will Go to Sleep (1954)
- I Often Think of Piroschka (1955)
- The Mad Bomberg (1957)
- Fear Eats the Soul (1974)

== Bibliography ==
- Fox, Jo (2000). Filming Women in the Third Reich. Oxford: Berg. ISBN 978-1-85973-391-2.
