= John C. Tibbetts =

American film critic and film historian (born 1946)

John Carter Tibbetts (born Paola, Kansas, October 6, 1946, and grew up in Leavenworth, Kansas) is an American film critic, historian, author, painter, and pianist. He was a film professor at the University of Kansas, now retired.

== Career ==
After receiving a Ph.D. in 1982 from the University of Kansas in multi-disciplinary studies—art history, theater, photography, and film (the first person to complete what was then regarded as an experimental curriculum in multi-disciplinary studies)-Tibbetts was tenured as an associate professor. Under the general rubric of "visual literacy", his course work includes film history, media studies, and theory and aesthetics.

Before entering the academy, Tibbetts worked from 1980 to 1996 as a full-time broadcaster. He was an arts and entertainment editor and producer for a variety of radio and television outlets, including KCTV (Kansas City’s CBS affiliate), KMBC Radio, and KXTR-FM radio. During that time he also contributed many broadcast stories about musicians, painters, playwrights, and filmmakers to CBS Television, the Monitor Radio Network, Voice of America, and National Public Radio. More recently, he has produced two radio series about music, including the 15-part The World of Robert Schumann and the 17-part Piano Portraits, that have been broadcast worldwide and are now a part of the permanent collection of the Rodgers & Hammerstein Archives in Lincoln Center, New York. Both derive from his knowledge of music and feature numerous interviews with musicians and scholars in the musical field.

Music, theater, literature, and film play a substantial part in his 25 books and more than 250 articles. Recent book publications include The Gothic Imagination (Palgrave Macmillan, 2011), which featured his interviews with dozens of prominent figures in literature, music, painting, and film. Individual studies of filmmakers, writers, and composers include Douglas Fairbanks and the American Century (Mississippi University Press, 2014), Peter Weir: Interviews (Mississippi University Press, 2014), The Gothic Worlds of Peter Straub (McFarlen, 2016), and Schumann: A Chorus of Voices (Amadeus Press, 2010). Other book publications include Dvorak in America (Amadeus Press, 1993), which was a multicultural study of the famous Czech composer's sojourn in America from 1892 to 1895. The eminent cultural historian, Robert Winter, greeted the book enthusiastically: "Of all the books on American music at the turn of the century, none brings together so many interesting and richly interrelated dimensions as Dvorak in America." An historical overview of the interactions of theater and film is explored in The American Theatrical Film (Popular Press, 1985), which is currently being used by Professor Charles Musser as a text in his courses at Yale University.

Film adaptations of theater and literature are the subjects of his various edited reference works, including The Encyclopedia of Novels into Film (Facts on File, 1998; rev., 2002), The Cinema of Tony Richardson (SUNY Press, 1999), The Encyclopedia of Stage Plays into Film (2001), and Shakespeare into Film (2002). The dramatization on film of the lives of classical and popular composers, Composers in the Movies: Studies in Musical Biography (Yale University Press, 2005), is the first scholarly study of the subject. It was praised by the dean of cultural studies, Professor Jacques Barzun, as "a welcome and worthwhile endeavor." It received second prize from the prestigious International Association of Media Historians for "Best Book on Media Studies" in 2007.

Tibbetts continues to pursue his work as a painter, illustrator, and writer of fiction. He has published several short stories, in Twilight Zone magazine, Weird Fiction Review, and been anthologized in Ballantine Books' anthology series, The Year’s Best Horror Stories, Series Eight. He has executed many covers and interior illustrations for his articles and books. His work has been featured in gallery exhibitions in Kansas City and at the University of Kansas, where the College of Liberal Arts and Sciences has reserved a wall for his paintings. He has had a lifelong passion for portraits, and claims to have painted thousands of them, on commission and on his own. He has exploited his opportunities as a broadcast interviewer to draw hundreds of images of popular actors, filmmakers, musicians, many personally inscribed and autographed. These images, numbering in excess of 700, are currently housed in the University of Kansas Spencer Research Library, where they are available for scholarly study and exhibition. His hundreds of video and audio interviews with prominent figures in the film, music, and literary fields can be accessed on his web site, "Over the Rainbow," as part of the University of Kansas Digital Initiatives program.

His ability as a pianist of twelve years' training has resulted in a secondary career accompanying silent movies at venues including the American Film Institute Theatre in Washington, D.C., the Silent Film Festival in Topeka, Kansas, and the annual Buster Keaton Celebrations in Iola, Kansas.

In addition to his teaching responsibilities and mentoring activities at the University of Kansas (where he has served as Associate Chair for the Department of Theater and Film), Tibbetts brings his knowledge and experience in the arts to a wider community service. For the Kansas Humanities Council he has lectured and presented topics on the arts and local history to many communities around the state, such as Garden Grove, Ottawa, and Council Grove. For more than twenty years he has appeared as an arts commentator and critic on the Walt Bodine Show on KCUR-FM radio, Kansas City, and, more recently, as a reporter and film critic on Kansas Public Radio. He organized the "Buster Keaton Celebrations," held annually in Iola, Kansas since 1992 and sponsored by the Kansas Humanities Council. In the 1980s he provided program notes for the concerts of the Kansas City Camerata Chamber Orchestra.

Tibbetts was the recipient of Kansas Educator of the Year in 2008.

== National Film Society of America ==
In 1976, the National Film Society of America, founded as an offshoot of the Bijou Film Society, of Bridgeport, Connecticut, which was associated with The Bijou Theatre, of Bridgeport, first published in 1976, American Classic Screen magazine, until 1985. Tibbetts was a member of the board of governors.

National Film Society convention 1979

On May 27, 1979, a National Film Society convention was convened in Los Angeles, by Randolph "Randy" Neil, of Kansas City, founder and president of the 5000-member society. Attending were: Mike Nichols, Jack Haley, Glenn Ford, Louise Fletcher, Don "Red" Barry John Houseman, Richard Donner, Virginia Christine, Victor Jory, Fritz Feld, Franco Nero, John McCook, Earl Holliman, Henry Brandon, Joan Leslie, Vivian Blaine, Henry Wilcoxon, Una Merkel, George Pal, Jackie Joseph, Ida Lupino, George Raft, John Phillip Law, Steve Landesberg, Robert Cummings, Rosemary DeCamp, Mel Torme, Judy Canova, Diana Canova, Janet Leigh, Kelly Curtis, Jamie Lee Curtis, Olivia Hussey, and Yvonne De Carlo.

== Publications ==
=== Publications on music ===
- "Grieg and Andsnes", American Record Guide, Vol. 68, No. 5 (September–October 2005), pp. 36–37.
- "Whose Chopin? Politics and Patriotism in A Song to Remember (1945)", American Studies, Vol. 46, No. 1 (Spring 2005), pp. 115–140.
- "Ken Russell’s The Debussy Film (1965)", Historical Journal of Film, Radio and Television, Vol. 25, No. 1 (March 2005), pp. 81–99.
- "Elgar’s Ear: A Conversation with Ken Russell", Quarterly Review of Film and Video, Vol. 22, No. 1 (January–March 2005), pp. 37–49.
- "The Voice that Fills the House: Opera Fills the Screen", Literature/Film Quarterly, Vol. 32, No. 1 (2004), pp. 2–11.
- "Marc-Andre Hamelin", The American Record Guide, Vol. 66, No. 4 (July–August 2003), pp. 4–7.
- "Shostakovich’s Fool to Stalin’s Czar: Tony Palmer’s Testimony (1987)", The Historical Journal of Film, Radio, and Television, Vol. 22, No. 2 (June 2002), pp. 173–196.
- "Howard’s End: A Lisztian Pianist Crosses the Finish Line", The American Record Guide, Vol. 62, No. 3 (May–June 1999), pp. 10–13.
- "Words and Music: Graham Johnson, Immersed in Schubert", The American Record Guide, Vol. 62, No. 6 (November–December 1999), pp. 22–25.
- "Andras Schiff: The Focus Is on Robert Schumann", The American Record Guide, Vol. 61, No. 5 (September–October 1998), pp. 47–49, 75.
- "Virgil Thomson: A Portrait in Music", The World and I, Vol. 11, No. 11 (November 1996), pp. 112–117.
- "Baffling Bartok: Secrets Beyond the Seventh Door", The American Record Guide, Vol. 58, No. 6 (November–December 1995), pp. 12–14, 21.
- "Firkusny’s Lasting Legacy", The World and I, Vol. 10, No. 1 (January 1995), pp. 112–117.
- "Robert Schumann's Illness", The American Record Guide, Vol. 57, No. 5 (September–October 1994), pp. 41–42.
- "Diese herrliche Frau", The World and I, Vol. 9, No. 10 (October 1994), pp. 112–117.
- "Young Berlioz Revealed", The World and I, Vol. 9, No. 2 (February 1994), pp. 112–117.
- "Rachmaninoff’s Piano Legacy", The World and I, Vol. 8, No. 3 (March 1993), pp. 114–121.
- "Remembering Rachmaninoff", The American Record Guide, Vol. 56, No. 1 (Jan-Feb 1993), pp. 6–14.
- "The Lyre of Light", Film Comment, January–February 1992, pp. 66–73.
- "A Midsummer Night’s Mendelssohn", The World and I, (November 1991), pp. 175–179.
- "In Search of Stephen Foster", The World and I, July 1991, pp. 253–259.
- "Dvorak in the New World", Classical Magazine, Vol. 3, No. 2 (February 1991), pp. 32–36.
- "In Search of Clara Schumann", Helicon Nine: The Journal of Women’s Arts and Letters, No. 16 (Winter 1986), pp. 76–87.

=== Books and articles on literature and film ===
- "August Wilson Interview", Literature/Film Quarterly, Vol. 30, No. 4 (2002), pp. 238–242.
- "Backstage with the Bard; or, Building a Better Mousetrap", Literature/Film Quarterly, Vol. 29, No. 2 (2001), pp. 147–164.
- "Brian Aldiss’ Billion Year Spree", Literature/Film Quarterly, Vol. 32, No. 4 (2004), pp. 246–254.
- "Back to Barsoom! Filmfax, No. 104 (October–December 2004), pp. 74–81, 138.
- "House of Mirth: Rooms with a View", Literature/Film Quarterly, Vol. 31, No. 3 (2003), pp. 199–202.
- "The Hard Ride: Jayhawkers and Bushwhackers in the Kansas-Missouri Border Wars—Ride with the Devil", Literature/Film Quarterly, Vol. 27, No. 3 (1999), pp. 189–195.
- "The Illustrating Man: The Screenplays of Ray Bradbury", Creative Screenwriting, Vol. 6, No. 1 (January–February 1999), pp. 45–54.
- "The Illustrating Man: The Screenplays of Ray Bradbury," The New Ray Bradbury Review, Vol. 2, No. 1 (2008), 61–78.
- "Flying into the Winds of Time: An Interview with Ray Bradbury", Outre, No. 26 (2001), pp. 30–34.
- "The Man Who Knew Too Much", The World and I, Vol. 4, No. 1 (April 1992), pp. 362–371.
- "The Third Elephant: An Interview with Joseph Mugnaini, the Illustrator of Ray Bradbury", Horror Magazine, No. 8 (Summer 1997), pp. 50–56 (reprinted in Outre, No. 19 (2000), pp. 32–37.
- "Time on His Hands: The Fantasy Fiction of Jack Finney", Outre: The World of Ultramedia, No. 16 (1999), pp. 52–56, 75, 81.
- "Lanford Wilson", The Journal of Dramatic Theory and Criticism, Vol. V, No 2 (Spring 1991), pp. 175–180.
- "Men, Women, and Ghosts: The Supernatural Fiction of Edith Wharton", Helicon Nine: The Journal of Women’s Arts and Letters, No. 9 (Winter 1983), pp. 44–53.
- "The New Woman on Stage: Women’s Issues in American Drama, 1890–1915", Helicon Nine: The Journal of Women’s Arts and Letters, No. 7 (Winter 1982), pp. 6–19.
- "The Stage Goes West: Routes to The Virginian", Indiana Social Studies Quarterly, Vol. XXXIV, No. 2 (Autumn 1981), pp. 26–37.
- "The old dark house: the architecture of ambiguity in The Turn of the Screw and The Innocents", in Chibnall, Steve and Julian Petley, eds., British Horror Cinema (London and New York: Routledge, 2002), pp. 99–116.
- "G.K. Chesterton (1874–1936)", in Winks, Robin, ed., Mystery and Suspense Writers (New York: Scribner’s, 1998), pp. 181–194.
- "Miracles of Rare Device: Chesterton’s Miracle Crimes", in Ahlquist, Dale, ed., The Gift of Wonder: The Many Sides of G.K. Chesterton (Minneapolis, MN: American Chesterton Society, 2001), pp. 101–109. Revision.
- "Miracles of Rare Device in the Detective Stories of G.K. Chesterton and Others", in Accardo, Pasquale and John Peterson, and Geir Hasnes, eds., Sherlock Holmes Meets Father Brown and His Creator (Sauk City, WI: The Battered Silicon Dispatch Box, 2000), pp. 106–113.
- "High Tea with Judith Lea", Gilbert! The Magazine of G.K. Chesterton, Volume 3, No. 6 (April–May 2000), pp. 16–17.
- "The Case of the Forgotten Detectives: The Unknown Crime Fiction of G.K. Chesterton", The Armchair Detective, Vol. 28, No. 4 (Fall 1995), pp. 388–393.
- "So Much Is Lost in Translation: Literary Adaptations in the 1990s", in Dixon, Wheeler Winston, ed., Film Genre 2000: New Critical Essays (Albany, NY: State University of New York Press, 2000), pp. 29–44.
- "The Long, Loud Silence" (553–554) and "The Other Passenger" (711–712) in Magill’s Guide to Science Fiction and Fantasy Literature (Pasadena CA: Salem Press, 1997).
- "Brown, Charles Brockden", in Sullivan, Jack, ed., The Penguin Encyclopedia of Horror and the Supernatural (New York: The Viking Press, 1986), pp. 58–60.
- "Back to Barsoom!" Filmfax, No. 104 (October–December 2004), pp. 74–81, 138.
- "Time on His Hands: The Fantasy Fiction of Jack Finney", Outre: The World of Ultramedia, Number 16 (1999), pp. 52–56, 75, 81.
- "The Kiss That’s Also a Bite: A Conversation with Suzy McKee Charnas", Horror Magazine, No. 9 (Winter 1998), pp. 62–65.
- "Time on Our Hands: H.G. Wells’ The Time Machine", The World and I, Vol. 10, No.5 (May 1995), pp. 330–334. (centenary of a classic novel)
- "Footprints on the Sands of Mars", The World and I, Vol. 9, No. 4 (April 1994), pp. 324–330 [written under the pseudonym "Jack Ketch"].
- "The Man Who Invented Christmas", The World and I, Vol. 8, No. 2 (December 1993), pp. 321–326.
- "Choice of Weapons", The World and I, Vol. 8, No. 9 (September 1993), pp. 184–193.
- "Locked Rooms and Mean Streets", The World and I, Vol. 7, No. 5 (May 1992), pp. 313–325.
- "The Mysteries of Chris Van Allsburg", The World and I, Vol. 6, No. 12 (December 1991), pp. 252–261.
- "The ‘Martian Chronicler’ Reflects", The Christian Science Monitor, 20 March 1991, p. 16.
- "Holmes in London, 1988", Baker Street Miscellanea, No. 7 (Spring 1989), pp. 32–43.
- "Bradbury Meets Disney", TWA Ambassador Magazine, Vol. 14, No. 7 (July 1981), pp. 12, 14, 16, 20.

=== Books and articles on film and filmmakers ===
- American Classic Screen: Interviews, Profiles, Features, 3 vols. Lanham, MD: The Scarecrow Press, 2010. 321 pp. 307 pp, 338 pp. Paper. John C. Tibbetts and James M. Welsh (eds.) ISBN 9780810876767 OCLC 608032305
- "'Arizona Jim': The Westerns of Douglas Fairbanks, Sr.," Journal of Popular Film & Television, Vol. 39, No. 2 (2011), 41–49.
- "The Watchers: Tales of Tomorrow on Television," Journal of the Fantastic in the Arts, Vol. 19, No. 3 (2009), 379–398.
- "Deadwood", Kansas History, Vol. 28, No. 2 (Summer 2005), pp. 113–115.
- "An Interview with Michael Moore", Film & History, Vol. 3, No. 2 (2004), pp. 86–88.
- "Faces and Masks: Peter Shaffer’s Amadeus from Stage to Screen", Literature/Film Quarterly, Vol. 32, No. 3 (2004), pp. 166–174.
- "Winstanley: or Kevin Brownlow Camps Out on St. George’s Hill", Literature/Film Quarterly, Vol. 31, No. 4 (2003), pp. 312–318.
- "Shostakovich’s Fool to Stalin’s Czar: Tony Palmer’s Testimony (1987)", The Historical Journal of Film, Radio, and Television, Vol. 22, No. 2 (2002), pp. 173–196.
- "Stanley Kubrick: A Life in Pictures", Literature/Film Quarterly, Vol. 29, No. 4 (2001), pp. 250–251.
- "Robots Redux: A.I. Artificial Intelligence, Literature/ Film Quarterly, Vol. 29, No. 4 (2001), pp. 256–261.
- "Mary Pickford and the American 'Growing Girl,'" The Journal of Popular Film & Television, Vol. 29, No. 2 (Summer 2001), pp. 50–62.
- "Hollywood and the Multicultural Republic", The World and I, November 2000, pp. 259–265.
- "Kevin Brownlow’s It Happened Here (1965) and Winstanley (1975)", Historical Journal of Radio and Television, Vol. 20, No. 2 (June 2000), pp. 227–251.
- "Life to Those Shadows: Kevin Brownlow Talks about a Career in Films", Journal of Dramatic Theory and Criticism, Vol. XIV, No. 1 (Fall 1999), pp. 79–94. (co-written with James M. Welsh)
- "The Incredible Stillness of Being: Motionless Pictures in the Films of Ken Burns", American Studies, Vol. 37, No. 1 (Spring 1996), pp. 117–133.
- "The Hole in the Doughnut: The Last Days of Buster Keaton", The Journal of Dramatic Theory and Criticism, Vol. X, No. 1 (Fall 1995), pp. 79–99.
- "Re-Examining the Silent Film: Interviews with Historians Charles Musser, Eileen Bowser, and Richard Koszarski", Literature/Film Quarterly, Vol. 23, No. 2 (1995), pp. 88–90.
- "Clint Eastwood and the Machinery of Violence", Literature/Film Quarterly, Vol. 21, No. 1 (1993), pp. 10–17.
- "The Wisdom of the Serpent: Frauds and Miracles in Frank Capa’s [sic] The Miracle Woman", The Journal of Popular Film and Television, Vol. VII, No. 3 (1979), pp. 293–309. Reprinted in Contemporary Literary Criticism, Vol. 16. Detroit MI: Gale Research Company, 1981, pp. 165–166.
- "A Matter of Definition: Out of Bounds in The Girl Friends", Literature/Film Quarterly, Vol. 7, No. 4 (1979), pp. 270–276.
- "Sternberg and The Last Command", Cinema Journal, Vol. XV, No. 2 (Spring 1976), pp. 68–73. Reprinted in Contemporary Literary Criticism, Vol. 20. Detroit MI: Gale Research Company, 1981, pp. 377–378.
- "Breaking the Classical Barrier" (Interview with filmmaker Franco Zeffirelli), in Behrens, Laurence and Leonard J. Rosen, eds., Writing and Reading Across the Curriculum (New York: Longmans, 2003), pp. 761–765.
- "Troell, Jan", in International Dictionary of Films and Filmmakers—Volume Two—Directors (Chicago: St. James Press, 1997), pp. 1001–1003.
- "The Wind", in MacCann, Richard Dyer, ed., Films of the 1920s (Metuchen NJ: The Scarecrow Press, 1997), pp. 115–118.
- "Rowland Brown", in Thompson, Frank, ed., Between Action and Cut (Metuchen, NJ: Scarecrow Press, 1985), pp. 163–182.
- Josef von Sternberg and The Last Command, in Contemporary Literary Criticism, Vol.20 (Detroit, MI: Gale Research Company, 1982), pp. 377–378.
- "Frank Capra’s The Miracle Woman", in Contemporary Literary Criticism, Vol. 20 (Detroit, MI: Gale Research Company, 1981), p. 165.
- "Vital Geography: Victor Seastrom’s The Wind", in Whittemore, Don and Phillip Alan Cecchettini, eds., Passport to Hollywood: The Film Immigrants Anthology (New York: McGraw Hill, 1976), pp. 255–261.
- "C.S.A.", Kansas History: A Journal of the Central Plains, Vol. 26, No. 2 (Summer 2003), pp. 118–120.
- "Hollywood and the Multicultural Republic", The World and I, November 2000, pp. 259–265.
- "Riding with the Devil: The Movie Adventures of William Clarke Quantrill", Kansas History: A Journal of the Central Plains, Vol. 22, No. 3 (Autumn 1999), pp. 182–199.
- "Peter Weir: The Poetry of Apocalypse", Seasons, Summer 1998, pp. 30–33.
- "The Kiss That’s Also a Bite: A Conversation with Suzy McKee Charnas", Horror Magazine, No. 9 (Winter 1998), pp. 62–65.
- "Disorder in the Court!: Hollywood’s take on the law and lawyers", The John Marshall Law School Magazine, Spring 1997, pp. 22–35.
- "Coquette: Mary Pickford Finds a Voice", Films in Review, Vol. XLVIII, No. 1-2 (January–February 1997), pp. 61–66.
- "‘Rosewood’ Remembers Race War", Christian Science Monitor, 25 February 1997, p. 14.
- "Mary Pickford Returns", The World and I (December 1996), pp. 112–117.
- "Mel Gibson: Citizen of the Planet", Los Angeles Magazine, 1996–1997, pp. 27–28, 30.
- "Robin Williams: The Bay Area’s Wild Child", San Francisco Magazine, 1996–1997, p. 1014.
- "Barry Levinson: Redefining Baltimore", Baltimore Magazine, 1996, pp. 6–8, 81.
- "Splendidly Self-Propelled: Douglas Fairbanks’ The Gaucho", Films in Review, Vol. XLVII, No. 718 (July–August 1996), pp. 96–101.
- "Man in Motion: An Interview with Buster Crabbe", Films in Review, Vol. XLVII, No. 7/8 (July–August 1996), pp. 34–42.
- "The Choreography of Hope: The Films of Douglas Fairbanks, Sr.", Film Comment, Vol. 32, No. 3 (May–June 1996), pp. 50–55.
- "The Making of Kansas City", Kansas City Magazine, April 1996, pp. 43–45, 62.
- "Shepard to the Rescue", The World and I, Vol. 11, No. 4 (April 1996), pp. 140–145.
- "‘Jumanji,’ A Whale of a Tale", The Christian Science Monitor, 15 December 1995, p. 12.
- "Many Bridges to Cross: A Fable about Whoopi", Films in Review, Vol. XLVI, No.9/10 (November–December 1995), pp. 46–53.
- "All That Glitters", Film Comment, Vol. 31, No. 2 (March–April 1995), pp. 52–55.
- "Railroad Man: The last ride of Buster Keaton", Films in Review, Vol. XLVI, No. 5/6 (July/August 1995), pp. 2–11.
- "Keaton the Prairie Pragmatist", The World and I, Vol. 10, No. 10 (October 1995), pp. 118–123.
- "Beyond the Camera: The Untold Story Behind the Making of Hoop Dreams", The World and I, Vol. 10, No. 10 (October 1995), pp. 132–139 [written under the pseudonym "Jack Ketch"].
- "Touching All the Bases: The Documentaries of Ken Burns", The World and I, Vol. 20, No. 1 (January 1995), pp. 150–161 [written under the pseudonym "Jack Ketch"].
- "Mel Gibson: Infinite Space", The World and I, Vol.9, No. 9 (September 1994), p. 151

=== Anthologies, book chapters, and reference works (selections) ===
- Composers in the Movies: Studies in Musical Biography by John C. Tibbetts. ISBN 0-300-10674-2
- Dvorak in America by John C. Tibbetts. ISBN 0-931340-56-X
- The Encyclopedia of Novels into Film by John C. Tibbetts and James M. Welsh. ISBN 0-8160-6381-8
- American Theatrical Film: Stages in Development by John C. Tibbetts. ISBN 0-87972-289-4
- The Encyclopedia of Great Filmmakers (Great Filmmakers Series) by John C. Tibbetts and James Michael Welsh. ISBN 0-8160-4385-X
- Encyclopedia of Filmmakers (Vol. 2) by John C. Tibbetts and James Michael Welsh. ISBN 0-8160-4384-1
- "An Unruly Completeness: Fritz Lehner's Mit meinen heissen Traenen," in Ingram, Susan, Markus Reisenleitner, Cornelia Szabo-Knotic, eds., Floodgates: Technologies, Cultural (Ex)Change and the Persistence of Place (Frankfurt am Main, Bern, Wien, New York, 2006), 77–106.
- "Movies of the 1920s," "The Midwest," "The Small Town," "The Machine in the Garden," in The Columbia Companion to American History on Film (New York: Columbia University Press, 2004).
- "The Old Dark House: The Architecture of Ambiguity in The Turn of the Screw and The Innocents," in Chibnall, Steven and Julian Petley, British Horror Cinema (London and New York: Routledge, 2002), 99–116.
- "The New Tin Pan Alley: 1940s Hollywood Looks at American Popular Songwriters," in Music and Culture in America: 1900-1950, edited by Michael Saffle (New York: Garland Publishing, Inc., 2000): 349-384.
- "So Much Is Lost in Translation: Literary Adaptations in the 1990s," in Wheeler Winston Dixon, ed., Film Genre 2000: New Critical Essays (Albany, NY: State University of New York Press, 2000): 29-44.
- "G.K. Chesterton (1874-1936)," in Mystery and Suspense Writers, edited by Robin Winks. New York: Scribner's, 1998): 181-194.

== Broadcast series ==
- The World of Robert Schumann (2006–2007), a 15-part radio series which features Tibbetts' interviews with dozens of biographers, musicians, and critics, has been broadcast worldwide on the WFMT Radio Network.
- Piano Portraits (2005–2014), a 17-part radio series which features Tibbetts' interviews with dozens of famous pianists, has been broadcast on Kansas Public Radio.

== Awards ==
- Second Prize, International Association of Media Historians for "Best Book on Media Studies" in 2007
- Kansas Governors Arts Award 2008
