= List of heads of member institutions of the University of London =

This is a list of all current heads of member institutions and central academic bodies of the University of London.

== Heads of member institutions ==
Vice-chancellor, Birkbeck

- Sally Wheeler

President, City St George's

- Anthony Finkelstein

Märit Rausing Director, Courtauld Institute of Art

- Mark Hallett

Warden, Goldsmiths'

- Pat Loughrey

Chief Executive and President, Institute of Cancer Research

- Alan Ashworth

President and Principal, King's College London

- Ed Byrne

Dean, London Business School

- Sir Andrew Likierman

Director, London School of Economics and Political Science

- Craig Calhoun

Director, London School of Hygiene & Tropical Medicine

- Peter Piot

Principal, Queen Mary

- Simon Gaskell

Principal, Royal Academy of Music

- Jonathan Freeman-Attwood

Principal, Royal Central School of Speech and Drama

- Gavin Henderson CBE

Principal, Royal Holloway

- Paul Layzell

Principal, Royal Veterinary College

- Stuart Reid

Principal, St George's

- Peter Kopelman

Director and Principal, School of Oriental and African Studies

- Adam Habib

Principal and Dean, The School of Pharmacy

- Anthony Smith

President and Provost, University College London

- Malcolm Grant CBE

== Heads of central academic bodies ==
Dean, School of Advanced Study

- Roger Kain CBE FBA

Dean, University of London International Programmes

- Jonathan Kydd

Dean, University of London Institute in Paris

- Andrew Hussey

Director, University Marine Biological Station, Millport

- Jim Atkinson
