= Ode on a Grecian Urn =

1819 poem by John Keats

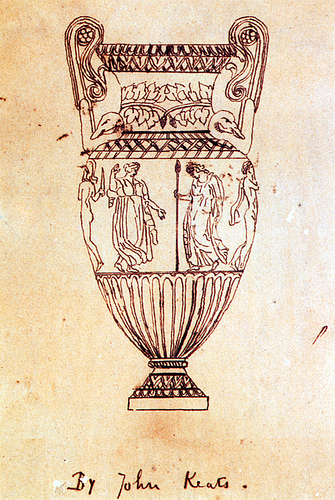
Tracing of an engraving of the Sosibios vase by Keats

"Ode on a Grecian Urn" is a poem written by the English Romantic poet John Keats in May 1819, first published anonymously in Annals of the Fine Arts for 1819 (see 1820 in poetry).

The poem is one of the "Great Odes of 1819", which also include "Ode on Indolence", "Ode on Melancholy", "Ode to a Nightingale", and "Ode to Psyche". Keats found existing forms in poetry unsatisfactory for his purpose, and in this collection he presented a new development of the ode form. He was inspired to write the poem after reading two articles by English artist and writer Benjamin Haydon. Through his awareness of other writings in this field and his first-hand acquaintance with the Elgin Marbles, Keats perceived the idealism and representation of Greek virtues in classical Greek art, and his poem draws upon these insights.

In five stanzas of ten lines each, the poet addresses an ancient Greek urn, describing and discoursing upon the images depicted on it. In particular he reflects upon two scenes, one in which a lover pursues his beloved, and another where villagers and a priest gather to perform a sacrifice. The poet concludes that the urn will say to future generations of mankind: "'Beauty is Truth, Truth Beauty.' – that is all / Ye know on earth, and all ye need to know". Critics have debated whether these lines adequately perfect the conception of the poem. Critics have also focused on the role of the speaker, the power of material objects to inspire, and the paradoxical interrelation between the worldly and the ideal reality in the poem.

"Ode on a Grecian Urn" was not well received by contemporary critics. It was only by the mid-19th century that it began to be praised, and it is now considered to be one of the greatest odes in the English language. A long debate over the poem's final statement divided 20th-century critics, but most agreed on the beauty of the work, despite certain perceived inadequacies.

== Background ==
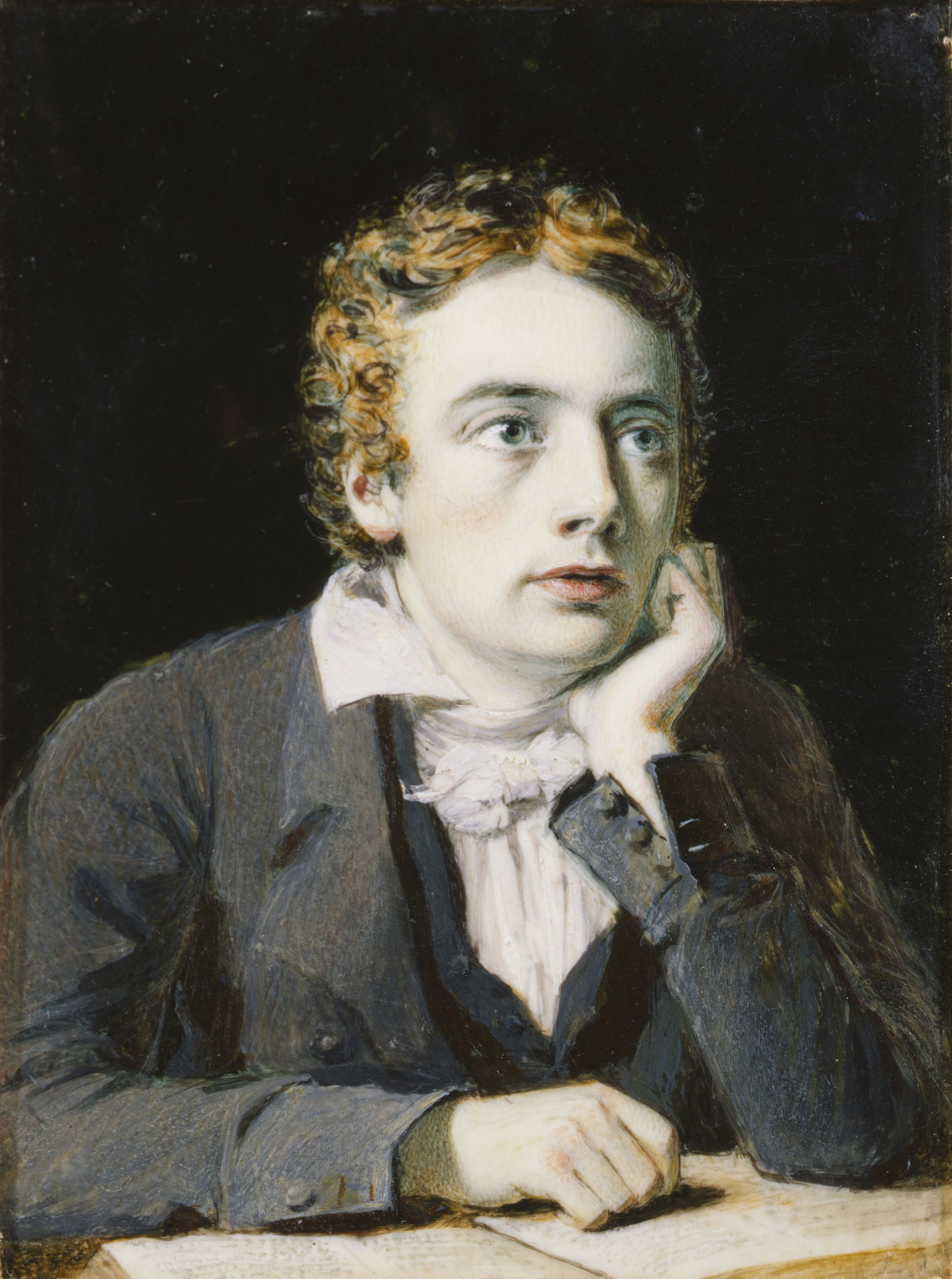
John Keats in 1819, painted by his friend Joseph Severn

By the spring of 1819, Keats had left his job as assistant house surgeon (where he dressed wounds), at Guy's Hospital, Southwark, London, to devote himself entirely to the composition of poetry. Living with his friend Charles Brown, the 23-year-old was burdened with money problems and despaired when his brother George sought his financial assistance. These real-world difficulties may have given Keats pause for thought about a career in poetry, yet he did manage to complete five odes, including "Ode to a Nightingale", "Ode to Psyche", "Ode on Melancholy", "Ode on Indolence", and "Ode on a Grecian Urn". The poems were transcribed by Brown, who later provided copies to the publisher Richard Woodhouse. Their exact date of composition is unknown; Keats simply dated "Ode on a Grecian Urn" May 1819, as he did its companion odes. While the five poems display a unity in stanza forms and themes, the unity fails to provide clear evidence of the order in which they were composed.

In the odes of 1819, Keats explores his contemplations about relationships between the soul, eternity, nature, and art. His idea of using classical Greek art as a metaphor originated in his reading of Haydon's Examiner articles of 2 May and 9 May 1819. In the first article, Haydon described Greek sacrifice and worship, and in the second article, he contrasted the artistic styles of Raphael and Michelangelo in conjunction with a discussion of medieval sculptures. Keats also had access to prints of Greek urns at Haydon's office, and he traced an engraving of the Sosibios Vase, a Neo-Attic marble volute krater, signed by Sosibios, in The Louvre, which he found in Henry Moses's A Collection of Antique Vases, Altars, Paterae.

Keats's inspiration for the topic was not limited to Haydon, but embraced many contemporary sources. He may have recalled his experience with the Elgin Marbles and their influence on his sonnet "On Seeing the Elgin Marbles". Keats was also exposed to the Townley, Borghese, and Holland House vases and to the classical treatment of subjects in Robert Burton's The Anatomy of Melancholy. Many contemporary essays and articles on these works shared Keats's view that classical Greek art was both idealistic and captured Greek virtues. Although he was influenced by examples of existing Greek vases, in the poem he attempted to describe an ideal artistic type, rather than a specific original vase.

Although "Ode on a Grecian Urn" was completed in May 1819, its first printing came in January 1820 when it was published with "Ode to a Nightingale" in the Annals of Fine Art, an art magazine that promoted views on art similar to those Keats held. Following the initial publication, the Examiner published Keats's ode together with Haydon's two previously published articles. Keats also included the poem in his 1820 collection Lamia, Isabella, The Eve of St Agnes, and Other Poems.

== Structure ==
In 1819, Keats had attempted to write sonnets, but found that the form did not satisfy his purpose because the pattern of rhyme worked against the tone that he wished to achieve. When he turned to the ode form, he found that the standard Pindaric form used by poets such as John Dryden was inadequate for properly discussing philosophy. Keats developed his own type of ode in "Ode to Psyche", which preceded "Ode on a Grecian Urn" and other odes he wrote in 1819. Keats's creation established a new poetic tone that accorded with his aesthetic ideas about poetry. He further altered this new form in "Ode to a Nightingale" and "Ode on a Grecian Urn" by adding a secondary voice within the ode, creating a dialogue between two subjects. The technique of the poem is ekphrasis, the poetic representation of a painting or sculpture in words. Keats broke from the traditional use of ekphrasis found in Theocritus's Idyll, a classical poem that describes a design on the sides of a cup. While Theocritus describes both motion found in a stationary artwork and underlying motives of characters, "Ode on a Grecian Urn" replaces actions with a series of questions and focuses only on external attributes of the characters.

"Ode on a Grecian Urn" is organized into ten-line stanzas, beginning with an ABAB rhyme scheme and ending with a Miltonic sestet (1st and 5th stanzas CDEDCE; 2nd, 3rd, and 4th stanzas CDECDE). The same overall pattern is used in "Ode on Indolence", "Ode on Melancholy", and "Ode to a Nightingale" (though their sestet rhyme schemes vary), which makes the poems unified in structure as well as theme. The word "ode" itself is of Greek origin, meaning "sung". While ode-writers from antiquity adhered to rigid patterns of strophe, antistrophe, and epode, the form by Keats's time had undergone enough transformation that it represented a manner rather than a set method for writing a certain type of lyric poetry. Keats's odes seek to find a "classical balance" between two extremes, and in the structure of "Ode on a Grecian Urn", these extremes are the symmetrical structure of classical literature and the asymmetry of Romantic poetry. The use of the ABAB structure in the beginning lines of each stanza represents a clear example of structure found in classical literature, and the remaining six lines appear to break free of the traditional poetic styles of Greek and Roman odes.

Keats's metre reflects a conscious development in his poetic style. The poem contains only a single instance of medial inversion (the reversal of an iamb in the middle of a line), which was common in his earlier works. However, Keats incorporates spondees in 37 of the 250 metrical feet. Caesurae are never placed before the fourth syllable in a line. The word choice represents a shift from Keats's early reliance on Latinate polysyllabic words to shorter, Germanic words. In the second stanza, "Ode on a Grecian Urn", which emphasizes words containing the letters "p", "b", and "v", uses syzygy, the repetition of a consonantal sound. The poem incorporates a complex reliance on assonance, which is found in very few English poems. Within "Ode on a Grecian Urn", an example of this pattern can be found in line 13 ("Not to the sensual ear, but, more endear'd") where the "e" of "sensual" connects with the "e" of "endear'd" and the "ea" of "ear" connects with the "ea" of "endear'd".

== Poem ==
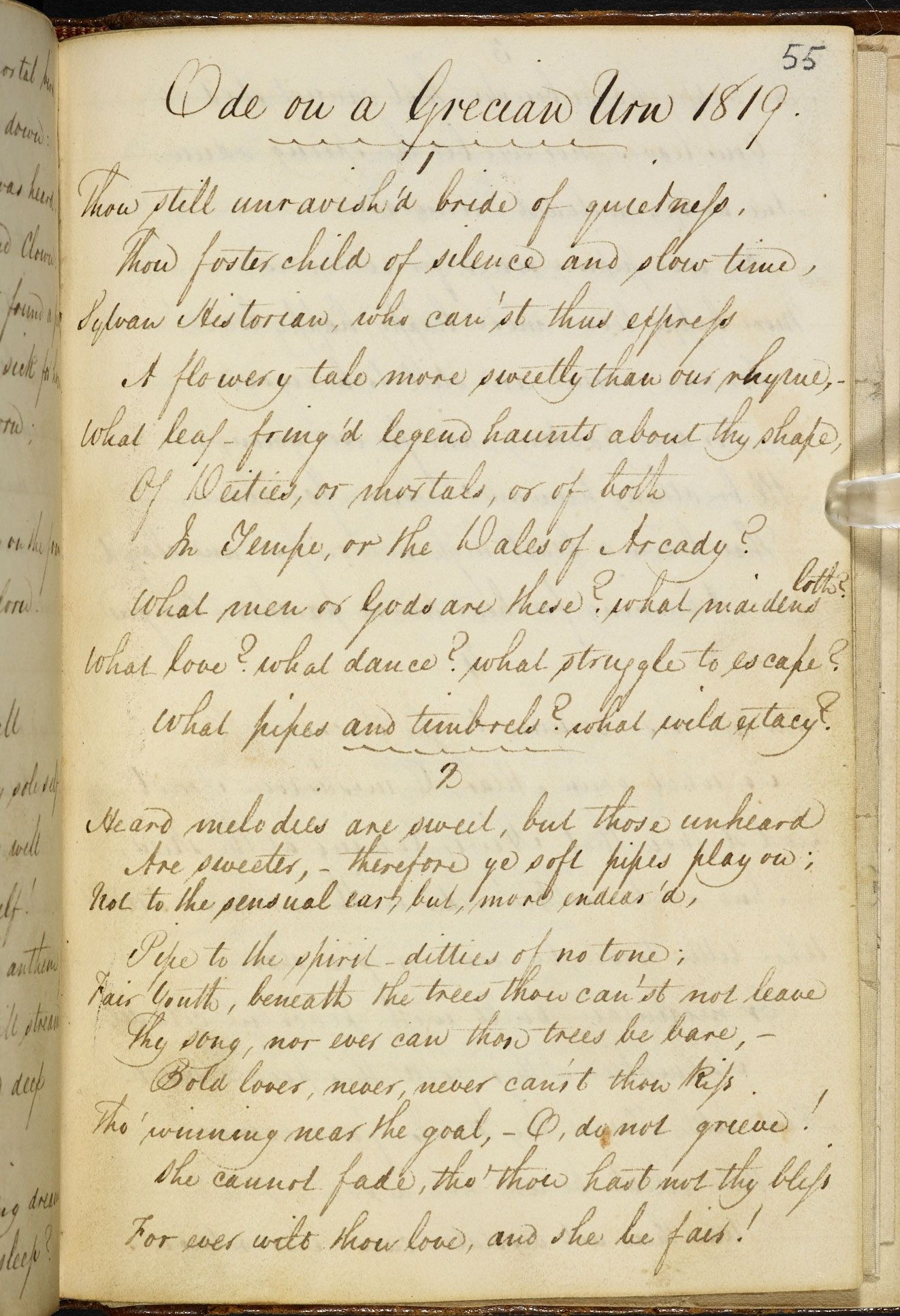
First known copy of Ode on a Grecian Urn, transcribed by George Keats in 1820

The poem begins with the narrator's silencing the urn by addressing it as the "bride of quietness", which allows him to speak for it using his own impressions.

Thou still unravish'd bride of quietness,
Thou foster-child of silence and slow time, (lines 1–2)

The urn is a "foster-child of silence and slow time" because it was created from stone and made by the hand of an artist who did not communicate through words. As stone, time has little effect on it and ageing is such a slow process that it can be seen as an eternal piece of artwork. The urn is an external object capable of producing a story outside the time of its creation, and because of this ability the poet labels it a "sylvan historian" that tells its story through its beauty:

Sylvan historian, who canst thus express
A flowery tale more sweetly than our rhyme:
What leaf-fring'd legend haunts about thy shape
Of deities or mortals, or of both,
In Tempe or the dales of Arcady?
What men or gods are these? What maidens loth?
What mad pursuit? What struggle to escape?
What pipes and timbrels? What wild ecstasy? (lines 3–10)

The questions presented in these lines are too ambiguous to allow the reader to understand what is taking place in the images on the urn, but elements of it are revealed: there is a pursuit with a strong sexual component. The melody accompanying the pursuit is intensified in the second stanza:

Heard melodies are sweet, but those unheard
Are sweeter; therefore, ye soft pipes, play on;
Not to the sensual ear, but, more endear'd,
Pipe to the spirit ditties of no tone:
Fair youth, beneath the trees, thou canst not leave
Thy song, nor ever can those trees be bare; (lines 11–16)

There is a hint of a paradox in that indulgence causes someone to be filled with desire and that music without a sound is desired by the soul. There is a stasis that prohibits the characters on the urn from ever being fulfilled:

Bold Lover, never, never canst thou kiss,
Though winning near the goal—yet, do not grieve;
She cannot fade, though thou hast not thy bliss,
For ever wilt thou love, and she be fair! (lines 17–20)

In the third stanza, the narrator begins by speaking to a tree, which will ever hold its leaves and will not "bid the Spring adieu". The paradox of life versus lifelessness extends beyond the lover and the fair lady and takes a more temporal shape as three of the ten lines begin with the words "for ever". The unheard song never ages and the pipes are able to play forever, which leads the lovers, nature, and all involved to be:

Ah, happy, happy boughs! that cannot shed
Your leaves, nor ever bid the Spring adieu;
And, happy melodist, unwearied,
For ever piping songs for ever new;
More happy love! more happy, happy love!
For ever warm and still to be enjoy'd,
For ever panting, and for ever young;
All breathing human passion far above,
That leaves a heart high-sorrowful and cloy'd,
A burning forehead, and a parching tongue. (lines 21–30)

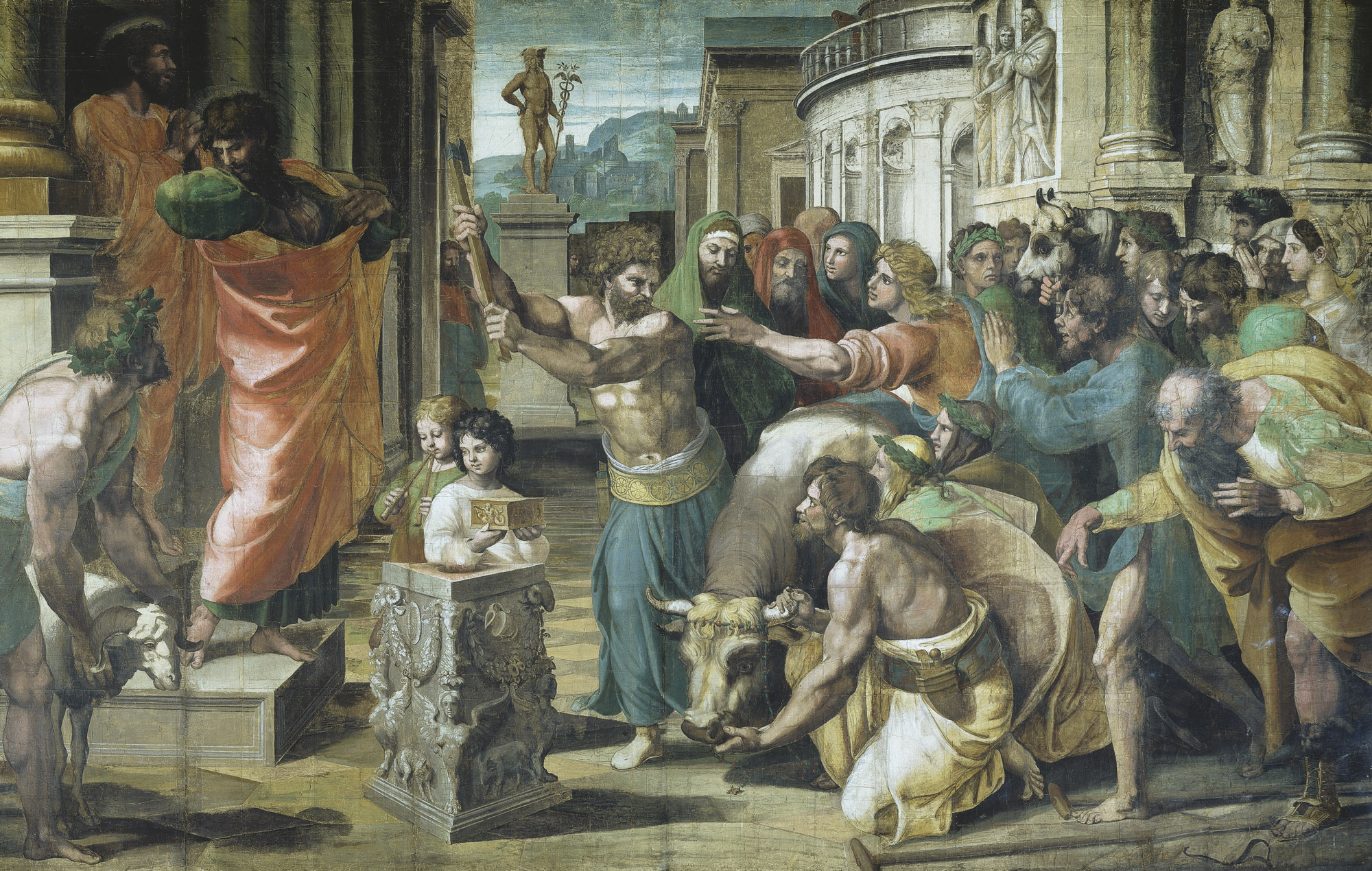
Raphael's The Sacrifice at Lystra

A new paradox arises in these lines because these immortal lovers are experiencing a living death. To overcome this paradox of merged life and death, the poem shifts to a new scene with a new perspective. The fourth stanza opens with the sacrifice of a virgin cow, an image that appeared in the Elgin Marbles, Claude Lorrain's Sacrifice to Apollo, and Raphael's The Sacrifice at Lystra (Note: The Raphael is one of the Raphael Cartoons then at Hampton Court Palace. The Claude is now usually called Landscape with the Father of Psyche sacrificing to Apollo, and is now at Anglesey Abbey. It was one of the pair of "Altieri Claudes", among the most famous and expensive paintings of the day. See Reitlinger, Gerald; The Economics of Taste, Vol I: The Rise and Fall of Picture Prices 1760–1960, Barrie and Rockliffe, London, 1961, and Art and Money, by Robert Hughes. Image of the Raphael, and image of the Claude)

Who are these coming to the sacrifice?
To what green altar, O mysterious priest,
Lead'st thou that heifer lowing at the skies,
And all her silken flanks with garlands drest?
What little town by river or sea shore,
Or mountain-built with peaceful citadel,
Is emptied of this folk, this pious morn?
And, little town, thy streets for evermore
Will silent be; and not a soul to tell
Why thou art desolate, can e'er return. (lines 31–40)

All that exists in the scene is a procession of individuals, and the narrator conjectures on the rest. The altar and town exist as part of a world outside art, and the poem challenges the limitations of art through describing their possible existence. The questions are unanswered because there is no one who can ever know the true answers, as the locations are not real. The final stanza begins with a reminder that the urn is a piece of eternal artwork:

O Attic shape! Fair attitude! with brede
Of marble men and maidens overwrought,
With forest branches and the trodden weed;
Thou, silent form, dost tease us out of thought
As doth eternity: Cold Pastoral! (lines 41–45)

The audience is limited in its ability to comprehend the eternal scene, but the silent urn is still able to speak to them. The story it tells is both cold and passionate, and it is able to help mankind. The poem concludes with the urn's message:

When old age shall this generation waste,
Thou shalt remain, in midst of other woe
Than ours, a friend to man, to whom thou say'st,
"Beauty is truth, truth beauty,"—that is all
Ye know on earth, and all ye need to know. (lines 46–50)

== Themes ==
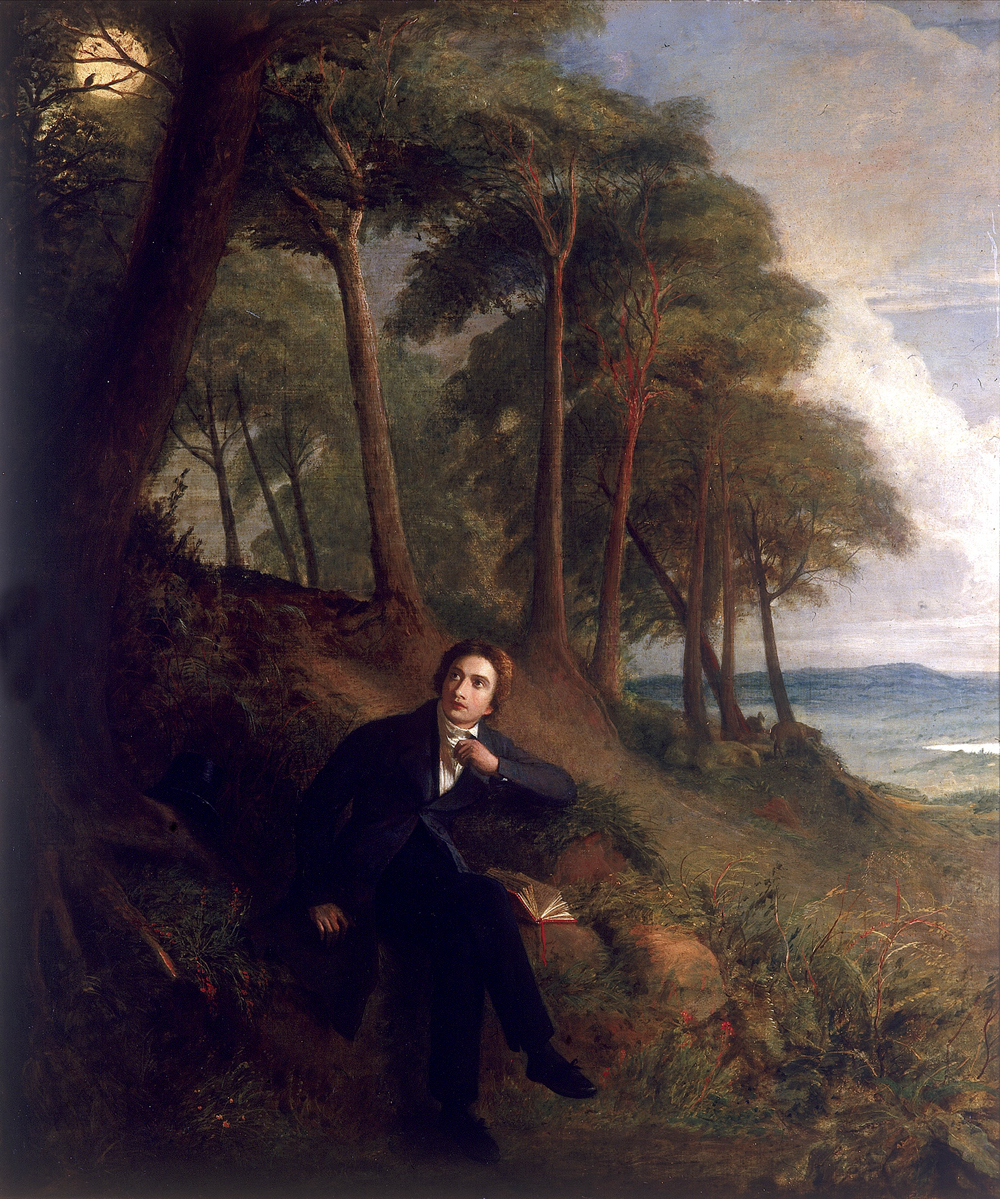
Keats Listening to a Nightingale on Hampstead Heath by Joseph Severn, 1845

Like many of Keats's odes, "Ode on a Grecian Urn" discusses art and art's audience. He relied on depictions of natural music in earlier poems, and works such as "Ode to a Nightingale" appeal to auditory sensations while ignoring the visual. Keats reverses this when describing an urn within "Ode on a Grecian Urn" to focus on representational art. He previously used the image of an urn in "Ode on Indolence", depicting one with three figures representing Love, Ambition and Poesy. Of these three, Love and Poesy are integrated into "Ode on a Grecian Urn" with an emphasis on how the urn, as a human artistic construct, is capable of relating to the idea of "Truth". The images of the urn described within the poem are intended as obvious depictions of common activities: an attempt at courtship, the making of music, and a religious rite. The figures are supposed to be beautiful, and the urn itself is supposed to be realistic. Although the poem does not include the subjective involvement of the narrator, the description of the urn within the poem implies a human observer that draws out these images. The narrator interacts with the urn in a manner similar to how a critic would respond to the poem, which creates ambiguity in the poem's final lines: "'Beauty is truth, truth beauty,' – that is all / Ye know on earth, and all ye need to know." The lack of a definite voice of the urn causes the reader to question who is really speaking these words, to whom they are speaking, and what is meant by the words, which encourages the reader to interact with the poem in an interrogative manner like the narrator.

As a symbol, an urn cannot completely represent poetry, but it does serve as one component in describing the relationship between art and humanity. The nightingale of "Ode to a Nightingale" is separated from humanity and does not have human concerns. In contrast, being a piece of art, the urn requires an audience and is in an incomplete state on its own. This allows the urn to interact with humanity, to put forth a narrative, and allows for the imagination to operate. The images on the urn provoke the narrator to ask questions, and the silence of the urn reinforces the imagination's ability to operate. This interaction and use of the imagination is part of a greater tradition called ut pictura poesis – the contemplation of art by a poet – which serves as a meditation upon art itself. In this meditation, the narrator dwells on the aesthetic and mimetic features of art. The beginning of the poem posits that the role of art is to describe a specific story about those with whom the audience is unfamiliar, and the narrator wishes to know the identity of the figures in a manner similar to "Ode on Indolence" and "Ode to Psyche". The figures on the urn within "Ode on a Grecian Urn" lack identities, but the first section ends with the narrator believing that if he knew the story, he would know their names. The second section of the poem, describing the piper and the lovers, meditates on the possibility that the role of art is not to describe specifics but universal characters, which falls under the term "Truth". The three figures would represent how Love, Beauty, and Art are unified together in an idealised world where art represents the feelings of the audience. The audience is not supposed to question the events but instead to rejoice in the happy aspects of the scene in a manner that reverses the claims about art in "Ode to a Nightingale". Similarly, the response of the narrator to the sacrifice is not compatible with the response of the narrator to the lovers.

The two contradictory responses found in the first and second scenes of "Ode on a Grecian Urn" are inadequate for completely describing art, because Keats believed that art should not provide history or ideals. Instead, both are replaced with a philosophical tone that dominates the meditation on art. The sensual aspects are replaced with an emphasis on the spiritual aspects, and the last scene describes a world contained unto itself. The relationship between the audience with the world is for benefiting or educating, but merely to emphatically connect to the scene. In the scene, the narrator contemplates where the boundaries of art lie and how much an artist can represent on an urn. The questions the narrator asks reveal a yearning to understand the scene, but the urn is too limited to allow such answers. Furthermore, the narrator is able to visualise more than what actually exists on the urn. This conclusion on art is both satisfying, in that it allows the audience to actually connect with the art, and alienating, as it does not provide the audience the benefit of instruction or narcissistic fulfilment. Besides the contradictions between the various desires within the poem, there are other paradoxes that emerge as the narrator compares his world with that of the figures on the urn. In the opening line, he refers to the urn as a "bride of quietness", which serves to contrast the urn with the structure of the ode, a type of poem originally intended to be sung. Another paradox arises when the narrator describes immortals on the side of an urn meant to carry the ashes of the dead.

In terms of the actual figures upon the urn, the image of the lovers depicts the relationship of passion and beauty with art. In "Ode to a Nightingale" and "Ode on Melancholy", Keats describes how beauty is temporary. However, the figures of the urn are able to always enjoy their beauty and passion because of their artistic permanence. The urn's description as a bride invokes a possibility of consummation, which is symbolic of the urn's need for an audience. Charles Patterson, in a 1954 essay, explains that "It is erroneous to assume that here Keats is merely disparaging the bride of flesh wed to man and glorifying the bride of marble wed to quietness. He could have achieved that simple effect more deftly with some other image than the richly ambivalent unravished bride, which conveys ... a hint of disparagement: It is natural for brides to be possessed physically ... it is unnatural for them not to be." John Jones, in his 1969 analysis, emphasises this sexual dimension within the poem by comparing the relationship between "the Eve Adam dreamed of and who was there when he woke up" and the "bridal urn" of "Ode on a Grecian Urn". Helen Vendler expands on the idea, in her 1983 analysis of Keats's odes, when she claimed "the complex mind writing the Urn connects stillness and quietness to ravishment and a bride". In the second stanza, Keats "voices the generating motive of the poem – the necessary self-exhaustion and self-perpetuation of sexual appetite." To Vendler, desire and longing could be the source of artistic creativity, but the urn contains two contradicting expressions of sexuality: a lover chasing after a beloved and a lover with his beloved. This contradiction reveals Keats's belief that such love in general was unattainable and that "The true opponent to the urn-experience of love is not satisfaction but extinction."

== Critical response ==
The first response to the poem came in an anonymous review in the July 1820 Monthly Review, which claimed, "Mr Keats displays no great nicety in his selection of images. According to the tenets of that school of poetry to which he belongs, he thinks that any thing or object in nature is a fit material on which the poet may work ... Can there be a more pointed concetto than this address to the Piping Shepherds on a Grecian Urn?" Another anonymous review followed in the 29 July 1820 Literary Chronicle and Weekly Review that quoted the poem with a note that said that "Among the minor poems, many of which possess considerable merit, the following appears to be the best". Josiah Conder, in a September 1820 Eclectic Review, argues that:

Mr Keats, seemingly, can think or write of scarcely any thing else than the 'happy pieties' of Paganism. A Grecian Urn throws him into an ecstasy: its 'silent form,' he says, 'doth tease us out of thought as doth Eternity,'—a very happy description of the bewildering effect which such subjects have at least had upon his own mind; and his fancy having thus got the better of his reason, we are the less surprised at the oracle which the Urn is made to utter:

'Beauty is truth, truth beauty,'—that is all
Ye know on earth, and all ye need to know.

That is, all that Mr Keats knows or cares to know.—But till he knows much more than this, he will never write verses fit to live.

George Gilfillan, in an 1845 essay on Keats, placed the poem among "The finest of Keats' smaller pieces" and suggested that "In originality, Keats has seldom been surpassed. His works 'rise like an exhalation.' His language has been formed on a false system; but, ere he died, was clarifying itself from its more glaring faults, and becoming copious clear, and select. He seems to have been averse to all speculative thought, and his only creed, we fear, was expressed in the words— Beauty is truth,—truth beauty". The 1857 Encyclopædia Britannica contained an article on Keats by Alexander Smith, which stated: "Perhaps the most exquisite specimen of Keats' poetry is the 'Ode to the Grecian Urn'; it breathes the very spirit of antiquity,—eternal beauty and eternal repose." During the mid-19th century, Matthew Arnold claimed that the passage describing the little town "is Greek, as Greek as a thing from Homer or Theocritus; it is composed with the eye on the object, a radiancy and light clearness being added."

=== 'Beauty is truth' debate ===
The 20th century marked the beginning of a critical dispute over the final lines of the poem and their relationship to the beauty of the whole work. Poet laureate Robert Bridges sparked the debate when he argued:

The thought as enounced in the first stanza is the supremacy of ideal art over Nature, because of its unchanging expression of perfect; and this is true and beautiful; but its amplification in the poem is unprogressive, monotonous, and scattered ... which gives an effect of poverty in spite of the beauty. The last stanza enters stumbling upon a pun, but its concluding lines are very fine, and make a sort of recovery with their forcible directness.

Bridges believed that the final lines redeemed an otherwise bad poem. Arthur Quiller-Couch responded with a contrary view and claimed that the lines were "a vague observation – to anyone whom life has taught to face facts and define his terms, actually an uneducated conclusion, albeit most pardonable in one so young and ardent." The debate expanded when I. A. Richards, an English literary critic who analysed Keats's poems in 1929, relied on the final lines of the "Ode on a Grecian Urn" to discuss "pseudo-statements" in poetry:

On the one hand there are very many people who, if they read any poetry at all, try to take all its statements seriously – and find them silly ... This may seem an absurd mistake but, alas! it is none the less common. On the other hand there are those who succeed too well, who swallow 'Beauty is truth, truth beauty ...,' as the quintessence of an aesthetic philosophy, not as the expression of a certain blend of feelings, and proceed into a complete stalemate of muddle-mindedness as a result of their linguistic naivety.

Poet and critic T. S. Eliot, in his 1929 "Dante" essay, responded to Richards:

I am at first inclined to agree ... But on re-reading the whole Ode, this line strikes me as a serious blemish on a beautiful poem, and the reason must be either that I fail to understand it, or that it is a statement which is untrue. And I suppose that Keats meant something by it, however remote his truth and his beauty may have been from these words in ordinary use. And I am sure that he would have repudiated any explanation of the line which called it a pseudo-statement ... The statement of Keats seems to me meaningless: or perhaps the fact that it is grammatically meaningless conceals another meaning from me.

In 1930, John Middleton Murry gave a history of these responses "to show the astonishing variety of opinion which exists at this day concerning the culmination of a poem whose beauty has been acknowledged for many years. Whether such another cause, and such another example, of critical diversity exists, I cannot say; if it does, it is unknown to me. My own opinion concerning the value of those two lines in the context of the poem itself is not very different from Mr. Eliot's."

Cleanth Brooks defended the lines from critics in 1947 and argued:

We shall not feel that the generalization, unqualified and to be taken literally, is meant to march out of its context to compete with the scientific and philosophical generalizations which dominate our world. 'Beauty is truth, truth beauty' has precisely the same status, and the same justification as Shakespeare's 'Ripeness is all.' It is a speech 'in character' and supported by a dramatic context. To conclude thus may seem to weight the principle of dramatic propriety with more than it can bear. This would not be fair to the complexity of the problem of truth in art nor fair to Keats's little parable. Granted; and yet the principle of dramatic propriety may take us further than would first appear. Respect for it may at least insure our dealing with the problem of truth at the level on which it is really relevant to literature.

M. H. Abrams responded to Brooks's view in 1957:

I entirely agree, then, with Professor Brooks in his explication of the Ode, that 'Beauty is truth' ... is to be considered as a speech 'in character' and 'dramatically appropriate' to the Urn. I am uneasy, however, about his final reference to 'the world-view ...' For the poem as a whole is equally an utterance by a dramatically presented speaker, and none of its statements is proffered for our endorsement as a philosophical generalization of unlimited scope. They are all, therefore, to be apprehended as histrionic elements which are 'in character' and 'dramatically appropriate,' for their inherent interest as stages in the evolution of an artistically ordered ... experience of a credible human being.

Earl Wasserman, in 1953, continued the discussion over the final lines and claimed, "the more we tug at the final lines of the ode, the more the noose of their meaning strangles our comprehension of the poem ... The aphorism is all the more beguiling because it appears near the end of the poem, for its apparently climactic position has generally led to the assumption that it is the abstract summation of the poem ... But the ode is not an abstract statement or an excursion into philosophy. It is a poem about things".

Walter Evert, discussing the debate in 1965, justified the final lines of the poem to declare "The poem, then, accepts the urn for the immediate meditative imaginative pleasure that it can give, but it firmly defines the limits of artistic truth. In this it is wholly consistent with all the great poetry of Keats's last creative period." Hugh Kenner, in 1971, explained that Keats "interrogates an urn, and answers for it, and its last answer, about Beauty and Truth, may seem almost intolerably enigmatic". To Kenner, the problem with Keats's Beauty and Truth statement arises out of the reader's inability to distinguish between the poet, his reflections on the urn, and any possible statement made by the urn. He concluded that Keats fails to provide his narrator with enough characterization to be able to speak for the urn. Charles Rzepka, in 1986, offered his view on the matter: "The truth-beauty equation at the end of the 'Ode on a Grecian Urn' offers solace but is finally no more convincing than the experience it describes is durable." Rick Rylance picked up the debate again in 1990 and explained that the true meaning of the final lines cannot be discerned merely by studying the language. This posed a problem for the New Critics, who were prone to closely reading a poem's text.

=== Later responses ===
Not every 20th-century critic opined primarily on the quality of the final lines when discussing the success or failure of the poem; Sidney Colvin, in 1920, explained that "while imagery drawn from the sculptures on Greek vases was still floating through his mind, he was able to rouse himself to a stronger effort and produce a true masterpiece in his famous Ode on a Grecian Urn." In his 1926 analysis, H. W. Garrod felt that the end of the poem did not match with the rest of the poem: "Perhaps the fourth stanza is more beautiful than any of the others—and more true. The trouble is that it is a little too true. Truth to his main theme has taken Keats rather farther than he meant to go ... This pure cold art makes, in fact, a less appeal to Keats than the Ode as a whole would pretend; and when, in the lines that follow these lines, he indulges the jarring apostrophe 'Cold Pastoral' [...] he has said more than he meant—or wished to mean." In 1933, M. R. Ridley described the poem as a "tense ethereal beauty" with a "touch of didacticism that weakens the urgency" of the statements. Douglas Bush, following in 1937, emphasized the Greek aspects of the poem and stated, "as in the Ode to Maia, the concrete details are suffused with a rich nostalgia. The hard edges of classical Greek writing are softened by the enveloping emotion and suggestion. In his classical moments Keats is a sculptor whose marble becomes flesh."

In 1954, Charles Patterson defended the poem and claimed, "The meaningfulness and range of the poem, along with its controlled execution and powerfully suggestive imagery, entitle it to a high place among Keats's great odes. It lacks the even finish and extreme perfection of To Autumn but is much superior in these qualities to the Ode to a Nightingale despite the magic passages in the latter and the similarities of over-all structure. In fact, the Ode on a Grecian Urn may deserve to rank first in the group if viewed in something approaching its true complexity and human wisdom." Walter Jackson Bate argued in 1962 that "the Grecian Urn possesses a quiet and constrained composure hardly equaled by the other odes of this month and perhaps even unsurpassed by the ode To Autumn of the following September ... there is a severe repose about the Ode on a Grecian Urn; it is both 'interwoven' and 'complete'; and within its tensely braced stanzas is a potential energy momentarily stilled and imprisoned." In 1964, literary critic David Perkins claimed in his essay "The Ode on a Nightingale" that the symbol of the urn "may possibly not satisfy as the principal concern of poetry ... but is rather an element in the poetry and drama of human reactions".

F. W. Bateson emphasized in 1966 the poem's ability to capture truth: "The Ode to a Nightingale had ended with the explicit admission that the 'fancy' is a 'cheat,' and the Grecian Urn concludes with a similar repudiation. But this time it is a positive instead of a negative conclusion. There is no escape from the 'woe' that 'shall this generation waste,' but the action of time can be confronted and seen in its proper proportions. To enable its readers to do this is the special function of poetry." Ronald Sharp followed in 1979 with a claim that the theme of "the relationship between life and art ... receives its most famous, and its most enigmatic and controversial, treatment" within the poem. In 1983, Vendler praised many of the passages within the poem but argued that the poem was unable to fully represent what Keats wanted: "The simple movement of entrance and exit, even in its triple repetition in the Urn, is simply not structurally complex enough to be adequate, as a representational form, to what we know of aesthetic experience – or indeed to human experience generally." Later in 1989, Daniel Watkins claimed the poem as "one of [Keats's] most beautiful and problematic works."

Andrew Bennett, in 1994, discussed the poem's effectiveness: "What is important and compelling in this poem is not so much what happens on the urn or in the poem, but the way that a response to an artwork both figures and prefigures its own critical response". In 1999, Andrew Motion claimed that the poem "tells a story that cannot be developed. Celebrating the transcendent powers of art, it creates a sense of imminence, but also registers a feeling of frustration." Ayumi Mizukoshi, in 2001, argued that early audiences did not support "Ode to Psyche" because it "turned out to be too reflexive and internalised to be enjoyed as a mythological picture. For the same reason, the 'Ode on a Grecian Urn' drew neither attention nor admiration. Although the poet is gazing round the surface of the urn in each stanza, the poem cannot readily be consumed as a series of 'idylls'."

== Bibliography ==
- Abrams, M. H. "Ode on a Grecian Urn" in Twentieth Century Interpretations of Keats's Odes Editor Jack Stillinger. Englewood Cliffs: Prentice-Hall, 1968. OCLC 190950.
- Arnold, Matthew. Lectures and Essays in Criticism. Ann Arbor: University of Michigan Press, 1962. OCLC 3487294.
- Bate, Walter Jackson. John Keats. Cambridge MA: Belknap Press of Harvard University Press, 1963. OCLC 291522.
- Bate, Walter Jackson. The Stylistic Development of Keats. New York: Humanities Press, 1962. OCLC 276912.
- Bateson, F. W. "Ode on a Grecian Urn" in Twentieth Century Interpretations of Keats's Odes Editor Jack Stillinger. Englewood Cliffs: Prentice-Hall, 1968. OCLC 190950.
- Bennett, Andrew. Keats, Narrative, and Audience. Cambridge: Cambridge University Press, 1994. ISBN 0-521-44565-5
- Bloom, Harold. The Visionary Company. Ithaca: Cornell University Press, 1993. ISBN 0-8014-0622-6
- Blunden, Edmund. Leigh Hunt's "Examiner" Examined. Hamden: Archon Books, 1967. OCLC 310443971.
- Brooks, Cleanth. The Well-Wrought Urn: Studies in the Structure of Poetry. New York: Harcourt, Brace & World, 1947. OCLC 265162960.
- Bush, Douglas. "Introduction" in John Keats: Selected Poems and Letters. Ed. Douglas Bush. Cambridge MA: Harvard University Press, 1959. OCLC 276449.
- Bush, Douglas. Mythology and the Romantic Tradition in English Poetry. Cambridge: Harvard University Press, 1937. OCLC 55449294
- Carr, J. W. Comyns. "The Artistic Spirit in Modern Poetry". New Quarterly Magazine, Vol. 5 (1876), pp. 146–165. OCLC 2264902.
- Colvin, Sidney. John Keats. London: Macmillan, 1920. OCLC 257603790
- Eliot, T. S. "Dante" in Selected Essays. London: Faber and Faber, 1932. OCLC 250331242.
- Evert, Walter. Aesthetics and Myth in the Poetry of Keats. Princeton: Princeton University Press, 1965. OCLC 291999.
- Gittings, Robert. John Keats. London: Heinemann, 1968. OCLC 251576301.
- Gumpert, Matthew. "Keats's 'To Haydon, With a Sonnet on Seeing the Elgin Marbles' and 'On Seeing the Elgin Marbles'." The Explicator, Vol. 58, No. 1 (1999), pp. 19–22. doi:10.1080/00144949909596992
- Hofmann, Klaus, ‘Keats’s Ode to a Grecian Urn,’ Studies in Romanticism 45, 2 (Summer 2006), 251 – 84.
- Jones, John. John Keats's Dream of Truth. London: Barnes and Noble, 1969. ISBN 0-389-01002-2'
- Keats, John. The Poems of John Keats at the Internet Archive. Editor Ernest de Sélincourt. New York: Dodd, Mead & Company, 1905. OCLC 11128824
- Kelley, Theresa. "Keats and 'Ekphrasis'" in The Cambridge Companion to John Keats. Editor Susan Wolfston. Cambridge: Cambridge University Press, 2001. ISBN 0-521-65839-X
- Kenner, Hugh. The Pound Era. University of California Press, 1971. ISBN 0-520-01860-5
- MacGillivray, J. R. "Ode on a Grecian Urn", Times Literary Supplement (9 July 1938): 465–466.
- Magunson, Paul. Reading Public Romanticism. Princeton: Princeton University Press, 1998. ISBN 0-691-05794-X
- Matthews, G. M. John Keats: The Critical Heritage. New York: Barnes & Noble Publishers, 1971. ISBN 0-389-04440-7
- Mizukoshi, Ayumi. Keats, Hunt and the Aesthetics of Pleasure. New York: Palgrave, 2001. ISBN 0-333-92958-6
- Motion, Andrew. Keats. Chicago: University of Chicago Press, 1999. ISBN 0-226-54240-8
- Murry, John. Keats. New York: Noonday Press, 1955. OCLC 360836
- Patterson, Charles. "Passion and Permanence in Keats's Ode on a Grecian Urn" in Twentieth Century Interpretations of Keats's Odes Editor Jack Stillinger. Englewood Cliffs: Prentice-Hall, 1968. OCLC 190950.
- Perkins, David. "The Ode on a Nightingale" in Keats: A Collection of Critical Essays. Ed. Walter Jackson Bate, 103–112. Englewood, NJ: Prentice-Hall, 1964. OCLC 711263
- Richards, I. A. Practical Criticism. London: Kegan Paul, Trench, Trubner, 1929. OCLC 317672795
- Ridley, Maurice. Keats' Craftsmanship. Oxford: Clarendon, 1933. OCLC 1842818
- Rylance, Rick. "The New Criticism". Encyclopedia of Literature and Criticism. Ed. Martin Cole et al. 730–731. London: Routledge, 1990. ISBN 0-8103-8331-4
- Rzepka, Charles. The Self as Mind. Cambridge, Mass.: Harvard University Press, 1986. ISBN 0-674-80085-0
- Sharp, Ronald. Keats, Skepticism, and the Religion of Beauty. Athens: University of Georgia Press, 1979. ISBN 0-8203-0470-0
- Sheats, Paul. "Keats and the Ode" in The Cambridge Companion to John Keats. Editor Susan Wolfston. Cambridge: Cambridge University Press, 2001. ISBN 0-521-65839-X
- Sheley, Erin. "Re-Imagining Olympus: Keats and the Mythology of Individual Consciousness". Harvard University. Reprinted in "Romanticism on the Net", No. 45 (November 2007). Accessed 6 December 2008.
- Sikka, Sonia. "On The Truth of Beauty: Nietzsche, Heidegger, Keats". The Heythrop Journal, Vol. 39, No. 3 (1998), pp. 243–263. doi:10.1111/1468-2265.00076. Accessed 30 June 2011.
- Swanson, Roy Arthur. "Form and Content in Keats's 'Ode on a Grecian Urn'". College English, Vol. 23, No. 4 (January 1962), pp. 302–305.
- Vendler, Helen. The Odes of John Keats. Cambridge MA: Harvard University Press, 1983. ISBN 0-674-63075-0
- Wasserman, Earl. The Finer Tone. Baltimore: Johns Hopkins University Press, 1967. OCLC 271028805
- Watkins, Daniel. Keats's Poetry and the Politics of the Imagination. Rutherford: Fairleigh Dickinson University Press, 1989. ISBN 0-8386-3358-7
- Wigod, Jacob. "Keats's Ideal in the Ode on a Grecian Urn" in Twentieth Century Interpretations of Keats's Odes Editor Jack Stillinger. Englewood Cliffs: Prentice-Hall, 1968. OCLC 190950.
