= Clare Lees =

British medieval literature professor

Professor Clare A. Lees
- Occupations: Director of the Institute of English Studies, University of London

Academic background
- Education: University of Leeds (BA, MA); University of Liverpool (PhD)

Academic work
- Discipline: Medieval studies
- Sub-discipline: Gender studies, Old English literature, Medievalism

Clare A. Lees is professor of medieval literature and history of the language, and Director of the Institute of English Studies, University of London.

== Education ==
Lees earned her Bachelor of Arts and master's degree at the University of Leeds before earning her PhD at the University of Liverpool.

== Career ==
Lees was professor of medieval literature and history of the language at King's College, University of London from 2001 until 2018.

In 2013, Lees was director of the London Arts and Humanities Partnership, a Doctoral Training Partnership funded by the Arts and Humanities Research Council.

Lees featured on the panel of experts for the 'Beowulf' episode of 'In Our Time', broadcast 5 March 2015.

Lees was awarded a Leverhulme Major Research Fellowship in 2015.

In January 2018, Lees was named director of the Institute of English Studies of the School of Advanced Studies at the University of London.

== Expertise ==
Lees has published on a range of topics including Bede's account of Caedmon and the 'first hymn' in the English language; the Ruthwell Cross; and medieval masculinity.

More recently, Lees and her long-term collaborator and co-author Gillian Overing have explored contemporary medieval art works and poems by Caroline Bergvall, Roni Horn, and Sharon Morris.

== Publications ==
- Author of Medieval Masculinities: Regarding Men in the Middle Ages (1994).
- Author of 'Tradition And Belief: Religious Writing in Late Anglo-Saxon England' (1999).
- Co-Editor with Gillian R. Overing, A Place to Believe in: Locating Medieval Landscapes (2006).
- Editor of The Cambridge History of Early Medieval English Literature (2013).
- With Gillian R. Overing, The Contemporary Medieval in Practice (UCL Press, 2019).
