= Film Propaganda in Britain and Nazi Germany =

Film history book

- Author: Jo Fox
- Language: English
- Genre: Non-fiction
- Publication date: 2007

Film Propaganda in Britain and Nazi Germany: World War II Cinema is a 2007 book written by Jo Fox.
