= Sosibios Vase =

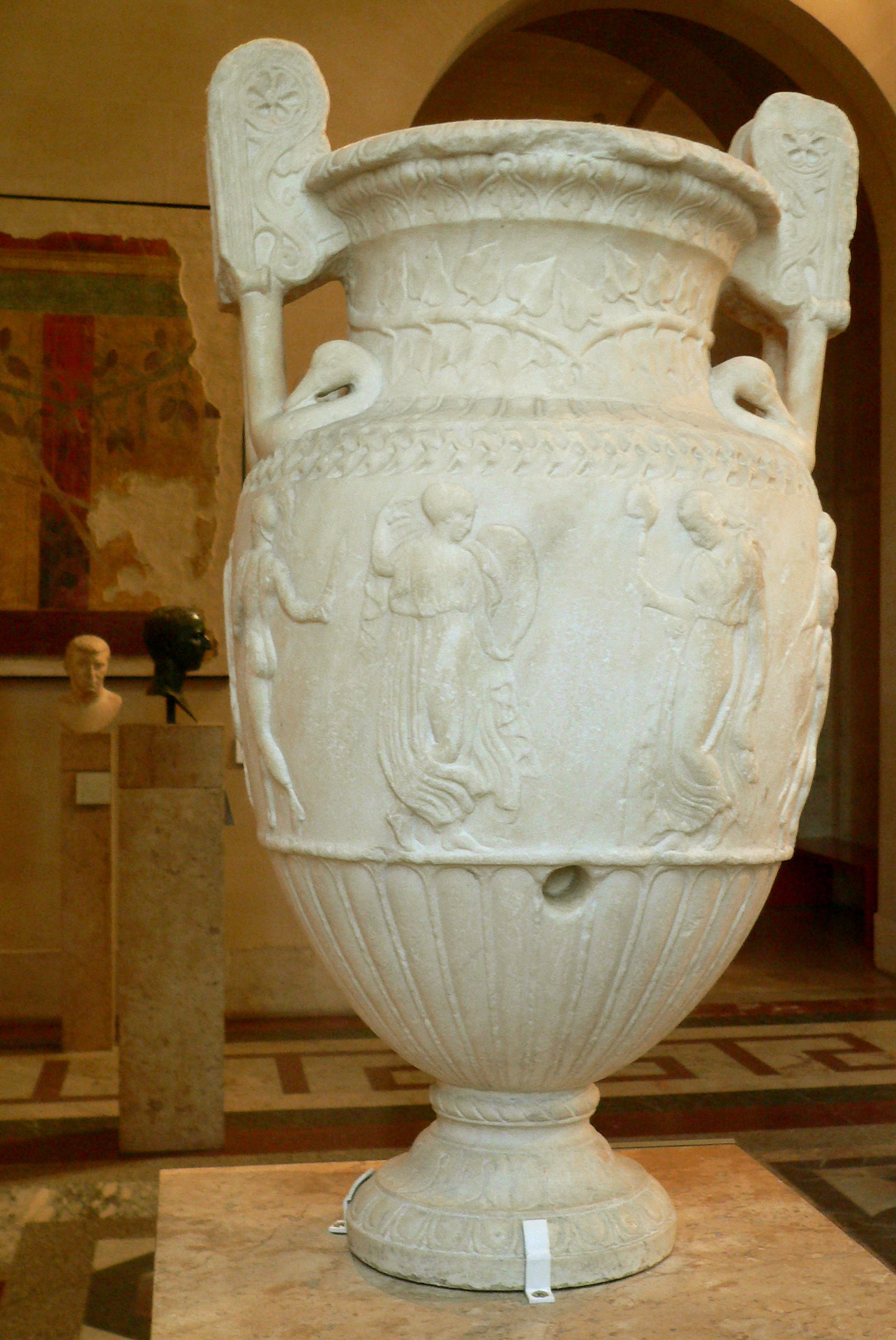
The Sosibios Vase in the Louvre

The Sosibios Vase is a Neo-Attic marble krater of the Hellenistic period. It is attributed by signature to Sosibios, a Greek sculptor who was active in Rome during the end of the Roman Republic, and is dated to approximately 50 BCE. It is Sosibios' only known work.

== Description ==
The krater, which stands at 78 cm. in height, is a marble adaptation of a type of metal vessel known from the late fifth century BCE (e.g. The Derveni Krater). It is decorated with a relief depicting Artemis and Hermes standing by an altar and presiding over a Bacchic procession of several maenads. Hermes is wearing a chlamys and bearing the caduceus. Artemis appears in her role as the huntress with a quiver on her back, a bow in her right hand, and a deer hoof in her left. The maenads are shown dancing to music, and are accompanied by a dancing satyr, and an armed warrior and Apollo, playing the cithara.

The artist's signature, reading "by Sosibios the Athenian," is engraved on the plinth of the altar.

== Recent history of the work ==
The vase was part of the royal collection of Louis XIV from 1692, but entered the Louvre in 1797 after becoming confiscated property under the Revolution. It is presently still housed in the Louvre.

The English poet John Keats traced an engraving of the Sosibios Vase after seeing it in Henry Moses's A Collection of Antique Vases, Altars, Paterae. His 1819 poem Ode on a Grecian Urn is presumed to have been partially inspired by this work.

== Bibliography ==
- ("Volute Krater" Louvre Museum Website) https://www.louvre.fr/en/oeuvre-notices/volute-krater
- Blunden, Edmund. Leigh Hunt's "Examiner" Examined. Hamden: Archon Books, 1967.
- Litvinskij, B.A., and N.O. Tursunov. “The Leninabad Krater and the Louvre Sosibios Vase (Neo-Attic Art and Central Asia).” East and West, vol. 24, no. 1/2, 1974, pp. 89–110.
- McDermott, William C. “Keats and Sosibios.” The Classical Journal, vol. 44, no. 1, 1948, pp. 33–34.
