= Institute of Philosophy, University of London =

Research institution associated with London University, UK

Institute of Philosophy
- Established: 2005
- Owner: School of Advanced Study, University of London
- Address: Senate House, Malet Street
- Location: London, England, United Kingdom
- Website: www.philosophy.sas.ac.uk

The Institute of Philosophy is a research institution associated with the University of London, founded in 2005. A member of the School of Advanced Study, the institute's focus is to promote and facilitate high quality research in philosophy so that it is available to the widest possible audience, both inside and outside the UK's academic community.

The Institute is based in Russell Square.
