= Between River and Steppe =

1939 film directed by Géza von Bolváry

- Directed by: Géza von Bolváry
- Written by: Michael Zorn (novel); Hans Gustl Kernmayr; Géza von Bolváry; S.S. von Varady
- Produced by: Dezsõ Ákos Hamza; Fritz Fuhrmann
- Starring: Attila Hörbiger; Heidemarie Hatheyer; Margit Symo
- Cinematography: Werner Brandes
- Edited by: Hermann Haller
- Music by: Dénes Buday
- Production company: Spectrum-Film
- Release date: 13 January 1939
- Running time: 85 minutes
- Countries: Germany; Hungary
- Language: German

Between River and Steppe (German: Zwischen Strom und Steppe) is a 1939 German-Hungarian drama film directed by Géza von Bolváry and starring Attila Hörbiger, Heidemarie Hatheyer and Margit Symo. It was shot at the Hunnia Studios in Budapest. The film's sets were designed by the art director Imre Sörés. A separate Hungarian-language version, Flower of the Tisza, was also produced.

== Cast ==
- Attila Hörbiger as Silo
- Heidemarie Hatheyer as Maria
- Margit Symo as Zigeunerin
- Hellmuth Bergmann as Alexander Renka
- Horst Birr as Anton
- Ilona Dajbukát as Tante Veronika
- Zoltán Greguss as Zigeuner
- Waldemar Leitgeb as Stefan
- Ferdinand Mayerhofer as Barnabas
- Charlotte Schellhorn as Agnes
- F.W. Schröder-Schrom as Landarzt
- Willi Schur as Paku
- Marcsa Simon as Frau Paku
- Karl Skraup as Tobias
- Bruno Ziener as Peter Wagner

== Bibliography ==
- Klaus, Ulrich J. Deutsche Tonfilme: Jahrgang 1939. Klaus-Archiv, 1988.
- Waldman, Harry. Nazi Films in America, 1933–1942. McFarland, 2008.
