= Jane Roberts (literary scholar) =

Northern Irish literary scholar

Jane Roberts, FSA, FEA, is a Northern Irish literary scholar. She was the Professor of English Language and Medieval Literature at King's College London from 1998 to 2001.

== Early life and education ==
Jane Roberts was raised in Ballymena, Northern Ireland. After attending Cambridge House School, she read modern languages at Trinity College Dublin graduating in 1956, then completed a diploma of higher education and an MLitt in 1959 with a thesis on women in Anglo-Saxon England. She then studied at St Hugh's College, Oxford, from 1959 to 1961; she was awarded a DPhil in 1967.

== Academia ==
Between 1961 and 1964, she was an assistant at the University of Glasgow. Promotion to a lectureship in English literature came in 1964. In 1968, she was appointed to a lectureship in Old and Middle English at University College Dublin. She was there for a year, moving to King's College London in 1969 to take up a lectureship in English. She was promoted to a readership in 1982 and a personal chair ten years later. She was appointed to the Professorship of English Language and Medieval Literature in 1998. She retired in 2001 and was appointed to an emeritus professorship at King's and a senior research fellowship at the Institute of English Studies.

Roberts's books include The Guthlac Poems of the Exeter Book (1979), A Thesaurus of Old English (co-authored with Christian Kay, 1995), A Guide to Scripts Used in English Writing up to 1550 (2005), and (as co-editor) Historical Thesaurus of the Oxford English Dictionary (2009). She was elected a fellow of the Society of Antiquaries of London in 2009. She was also elected a fellow of the English Association in 2014. She was the subject of a Festschrift published in 2001.

In 2022 she was elected a member of the Royal Irish Academy.
