= Sharon Morris =

British writer and academic

Sharon Morris is a Welsh poet and a senior lecturer at the Slade School of Fine Art (Film and Video), University College London.

In 2000 she completed a PhD on the writer Hilda Doolittle and the artist Claude Cahun, and in 2003 received a Leverhulme research fellowship for her writings on poetics, visual theory and semiotics. In addition, she has exhibited photography, film and video, and performed live artworks, combining spoken text with projected images.

== Works ==
Her first poetry collection False Spring was published in 2007 as the third volume in the Enitharmon New Poets Series. Her poems can also be found in several journals and anthologies, including Tying the Song (Enitharmon, 2000), the first anthology from The Poetry School, In the Company of Poets (Hearing Eye, 2003) and This Little Stretch of Life (Hearing Eye, 2007).
