= Rick Rylance =

British literary scholar and academic

Rick Rylance (born 1954) is a British literary scholar and academic who specialises in 19th-century and 20th-century literature.

He was the chief executive of the Arts and Humanities Research Council from 2009 to 2015. From 2016 to 2017, he was the Director of the Institute of English Studies, University of London. His final position was Dean and Chief Executive of that university's School of Advanced Study and Pro Vice-Chancellor (Research), until his retirement in September 2020.
