= Roger Kain =

British geographer and academic (born 1944)

Roger James Peter Kain, CBE, FBA (born 12 November 1944) is a British geographer and academic, who specialises in the history of maps. From 2010 to 2017 he was the Dean and Chief Executive of the School of Advanced Study of the University of London. He was elected a Fellow of the British Academy in 1990.
