= Filming Women in the Third Reich =

2000 book by Jo Fox and Angela Gaffney

- Author: Jo Fox; Angela Gaffney
- Language: English
- Genre: Non-fiction
- Publication date: 2000

Filming Women in the Third Reich is a 2000 book written by Jo Fox and Angela Gaffney.
