= School of Advanced Study =

Postgraduate institution of the University of London

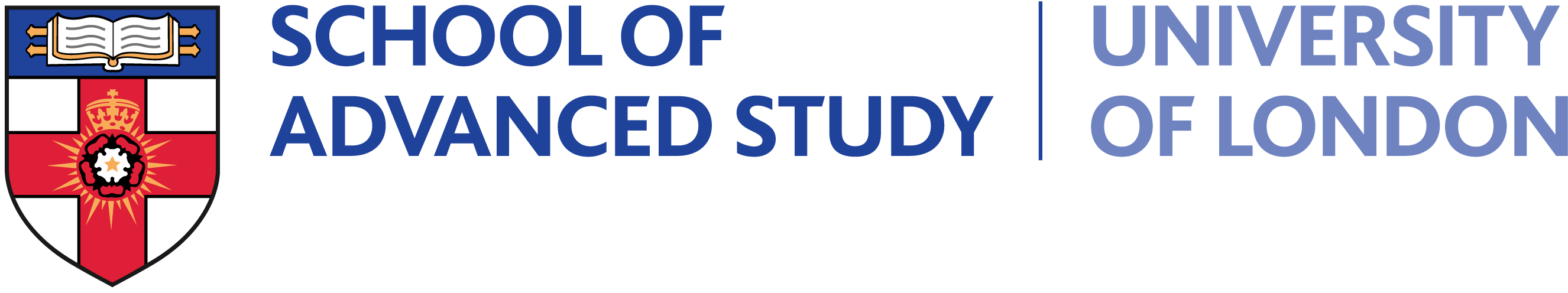
- Type: Graduate school
- Established: 1994
- Parent institution: University of London
- Dean: Jo Fox
- Location: London, England, United Kingdom
- Campus: Urban
- Website: www.sas.ac.uk

The School of Advanced Study (SAS), a postgraduate-only institution of the University of London, is the UK's national centre for the promotion and facilitation of research in the humanities and social sciences. It was established in 1994 and is based in Senate House, in Bloomsbury, central London, close to the British Museum, British Library and several of the colleges of the University of London. The School brings together nine research institutes, many of which have long histories, to provide a wide range of specialist research services, facilities and resources. It offers taught master's and research degrees in humanities and social science subjects (MA, MRes, LLM, MPhil, and PhD).

== History ==
The School was established on 1 August 1994. Its eight institutes range in age with the oldest, the Institute of Historical Research, founded in 1921 and the youngest, the Institute of Philosophy, founded in 2005.

== Location ==
The School is in Senate House, the administrative centre of the University of London, in Bloomsbury, central London.

== Organisation and structure ==
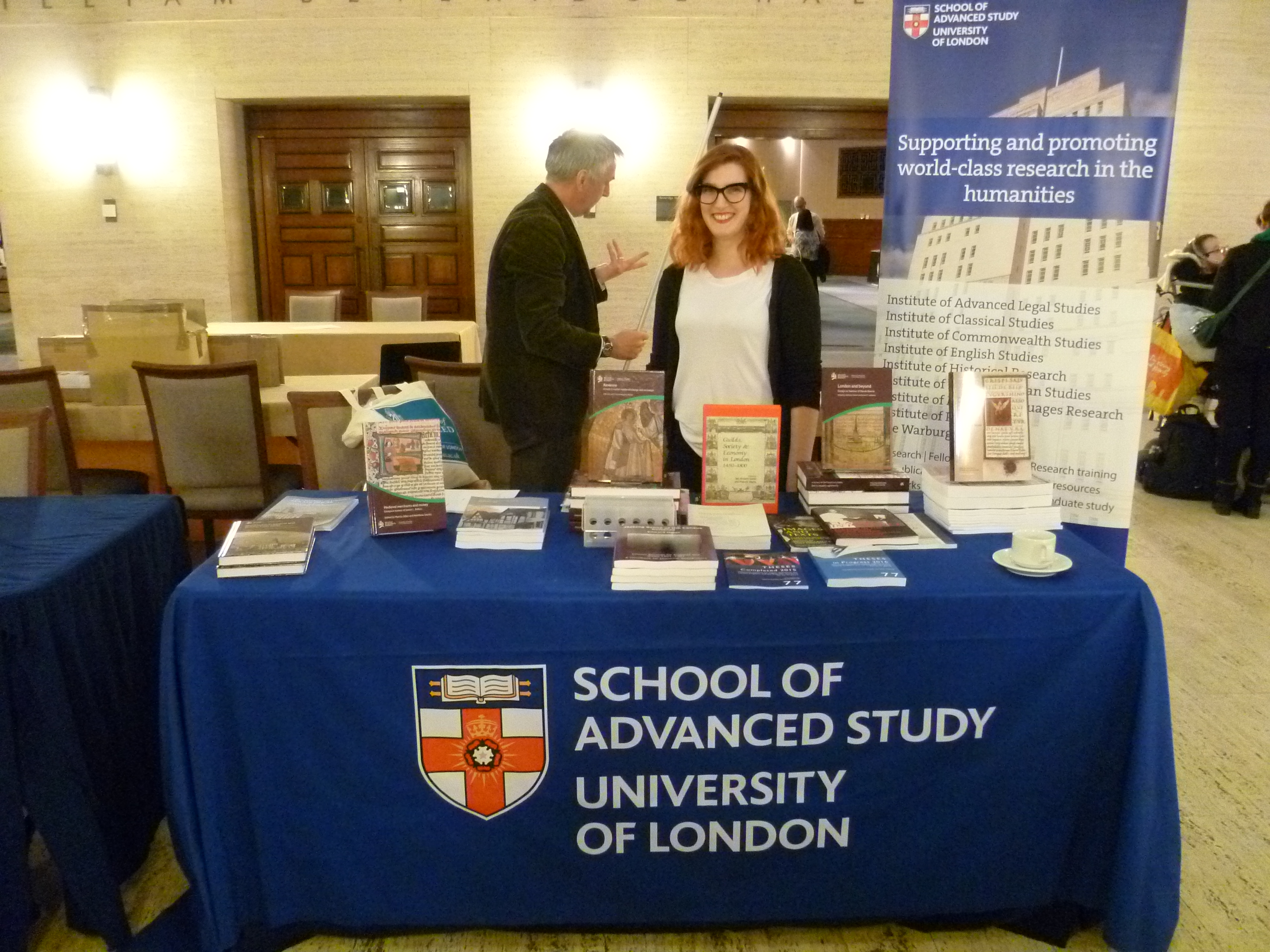
The School of Advanced Study at the Senate House History Day, 2016

The school is managed by a directorate consisting of the dean (Claire Gorrara; also University of London pro vice-chancellor for research and public engagement), vice-dean, heads of the member institutes, the head of the University of London Press and the director of the Digital Humanities Research Hub. In addition to University of London oversight, it is overseen by a Research England advisory group in relation to its national role.

=== Member institutes ===
The member institutes of the school are:

- Institute of Advanced Legal Studies
- Institute of Classical Studies
- Institute of Commonwealth Studies
- Institute of English Studies
- Institute of Historical Research
- Institute of Languages, Cultures and Societies (including the Centre for Latin American and Caribbean Studies)
- Institute of Philosophy
- Warburg Institute

== National role ==
The school receives special funding from Research England to support its national role in the humanities. As part of this role, it carries out a number of activities to support and promote humanities research.

=== Publishing ===
The University of London Press (also known as UoL Press) is based in the School of Advanced Study. Founded in 1910, it was relaunched in 2019 as a fully open-access publisher specialising in "distinctive scholarship at the forefront of the humanities".

=== Digital humanities ===
The strategy funded by Research England for 2024–29 includes the establishment of a Digital Humanities Research Institute. This will build on the Digital Humanities Research Hub at the school, established in 2020, that brings together researchers in digital humanities from across the school's institutes.

=== Consortium of Institutes of Advanced Study ===
The School of Advanced Study manages the Consortium of Institutes of Advanced Study, bringing together 23 institutes of advanced study within universities across the UK and Ireland to build capacity in interdisciplinary research spanning the humanities, social sciences and natural sciences. These include:

- ArtsLab, University of Glasgow
- Centre for Advanced Studies, University of Nottingham
- Centre for Research in the Arts, Social Sciences and Humanities, University of Cambridge
- Humanities and Arts Research Centre, Royal Holloway University of London
- Humanities Research Centre, University of York
- Institute for Advanced Studies in the Humanities, University of Edinburgh
- Institute of Advanced Studies, University of Birmingham
- Institute of Advanced Studies, University of Surrey
- Institute of Advanced Studies, University College London
- Institute of Advanced Studies, Loughborough University
- Institute of Advanced Studies, University of Stirling
- Institute of Advanced Study, Durham University
- Institute of Advanced Study, University of Warwick
- Institute of Design Innovation, Glasgow School of Art
- King’s College Arts and Humanities Research Institute, King's College London
- Leeds Arts and Humanities Research Institute, University of Leeds
- Leicester Institute of Advanced Study, University of Leicester
- Lincoln Institute for Advanced Studies, University of Lincoln
- Newcastle University Humanities Research Institute, Newcastle University
- Oxford Research Centre in the Humanities, University of Oxford
- Queen Mary Institute for the Humanities and Social Sciences, Queen Mary, University of London
- School of Advanced Study, University of London
- Southampton Institute for Arts and Humanities, University of Southampton
- UCD Humanities Institute, University College Dublin

== Deans ==
Notable deans of the school include:

- Roderick Floud – 2007 to 2009
- Roger Kain – 2010 to 2017
- Rick Rylance – 2017 to 2020
- Jo Fox – 2020 to 2025
