= Institute of English Studies =

Institute which promotes the study of English

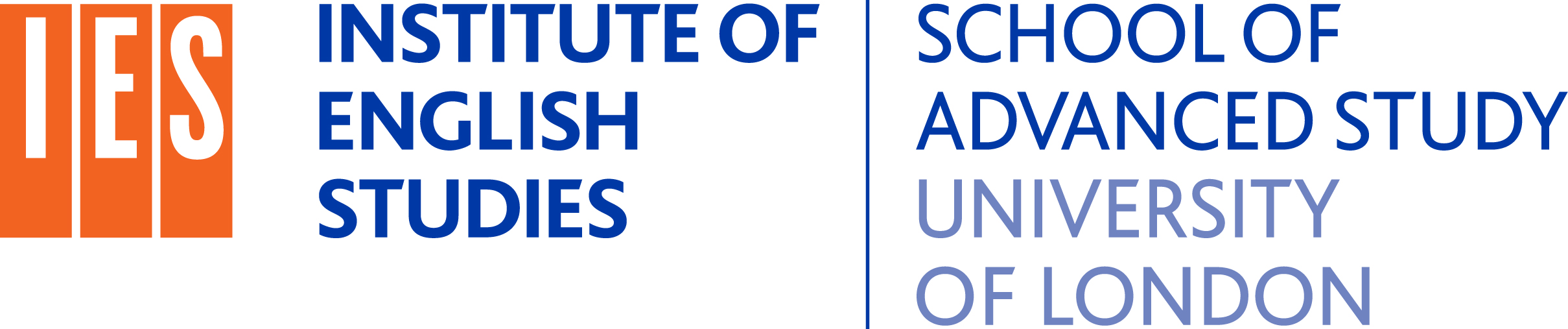
- Type: Graduate school
- Established: 1999
- Parent institution: School of Advanced Study, University of London
- Director: Clare Lees
- Location: London, England, United Kingdom
- Website: www.ies.sas.ac.uk

The Institute of English Studies (abbreviated as IES) is a centre of excellence in the research, promotion and facilitation in the field English Literature and Language. With a specialisation in book history, palaeography and textual scholarship, the IES facilitates the advanced study and research of English Studies in the national and international academic community. The institute, located in Senate House, London, is one of the nine institutes that together comprise the School of Advanced Study, University of London.

== History ==
The institute was founded as the Centre for English studies in 1991. Institute status was conferred by the University Council on 2 December 1998, and it officially became known as the Institute of English Studies on New Year's Day, 1999. The institute faced closure in 2014, but a successful campaign in 2014 resulted in the reversal of this decision.

== Networks ==
The institute is partner in a number of important research networks and collaborations. In 2001 it helped establish the Centre for Manuscript and Print Studies, a collaboration between The British Library, St Bride Library, University of London Research Library Services (ULRLS), The English Department, University of Birmingham, School of English, University of Reading, Literature Department, Open University, The Shakespeare Institute, and The Centre for Textual Studies, De Montfort University. It hosts and administers two prestigious and distinguished societies: The Bibliographical Society and The Malone Society and provides administrative support to the London Palaeography Teachers' Group. The institute has an established academic partnership with the Blackburn Museum and Art Gallery.

== Research ==
The Institute is a leading organisation in the research of English literary studies. Current projects include:

- The Matrix Reloaded: Establishing Cataloguing & Research Guidelines for Artefacts of Printing Images
- Early Modern Frisket Sheets
- Yellow Text Blocks

Previous and ongoing projects include:

- Make do and mend: A publishing and communications history of the Ministry of Information,
- A History of Oxford University Press,
- the T. S. Eliot Editorial Project,
- the Virtual Museum of Writing,
- Revising the Canon of Elizabethan Drama,
- A Catalogue of English Literary Manuscripts, 1450–1700,
- The Collected Works of John Ford,
- The Oxford Francis Bacon Project,
- Reading Experience Database,
- DigCim: a Digital Catalogue of Illuminated Manuscripts (in collaboration with the British Library),
- "Between Two Worlds": Authors and Publishers 1870–1939 and
- The Irish Book in the Twentieth Century.

== Teaching ==
The institute's MA in book history, which started in 1995, is credited as the United Kingdom's first postgraduate course in the subject. The institute currently offers MRes, MPhil, and PhD programmes.

The institute hosts four intensive research training courses, including the London Rare Books School, the London International Palaeography Summer School, the T.S. Eliot Summer School, and the Nineteenth Century Study Week.

== Publications ==
The Institute of English is home to the Yeats Annual, edited by Professor Warwick Gould, and published in association with Palgrave Macmillan.

== Staff and fellows ==
The intellectual and scholarly community of the institute thrives due to the collaboration between IES Staff, distinguished and senior research fellows, associate fellows, visiting fellows and students.

The current academic staff of the institute include:

- Clare A Lees (Director)
- Sarah Churchwell
- Cynthia Johnston
- Andrew Nash
- Christopher Ohge
- Elizabeth Savage

Senior research fellows of the institute include:

- Isobel Armstrong
- Rosemary Ashton
- Nicolas Barker
- John Barnard
- Peter Beal
- Michelle P. Brown
- Warren Chernaik
- Sandra Clark
- Elizabeth Danbury
- Mirjam Foot
- R.F. Foster
- Hans Walter Gabler
- Warwick Gould, founding director from 1999 to 2013
- John Haffenden
- Coral Ann Howells
- Aamer Hussein
- Elizabeth Maslen
- W. J. McCormack
- James Mosley
- Jerome McGann
- Ken Parker
- Richard Proudfoot
- Christopher Ricks
- Jane Roberts
- Pamela Robinson
- Sir Christopher Ricks
- Ronald Schuchard
- Graham Shaw
- Michael Slater
- Colin Smyth
- John Spiers
- Jeremy Treglown
- William St. Clair
- Sir Brian Vickers
- Anthony J. West
- Ian Willison
- Henry Woudhuysen
