= International Association for Media and History =

The International Association for Media and History (IAMHIST) is a scholarly organization which brings together media historians and professionals with an interest in media history. Founded in the summer of 1977 it organizes biennial conferences, which have typically rotated between venues in the UK, US and the continent of Europe. The association has been especially associated with the study of the role of film, radio and television in the First and Second World Wars and the Cold War, and the advancement of the systematic use of audiovisual materials as historical sources. The organization produces the quarterly journal The Historical Journal of Film, Radio and Television.

IAMHIST is an organisation of scholars dedicated to the research of the history of media.

It was not until 1999, at the IAMHIST conference hosted by the University of Leeds (UK), that academics and program makers involved in history and television from around the world met to analyze how different TV systems represent themselves, explore archive accessibility, and to discuss the future of television. The conference contributed to a collection of essays in the book The Historian, Television, and Television History.

The association awards the bi-annual “IAMHIST Prize” for the best contribution on the subject of media and history to have been published or shown in the preceding two years, given to the book, radio or television programme or series, film, DVD, CDRom, or URL making that contribution.

The current president is Nicholas Cull.
