= Historical Journal of Film, Radio and Television =

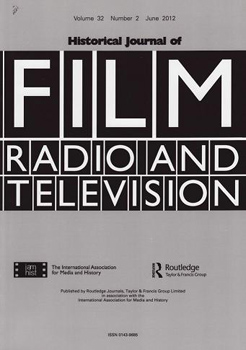
- Discipline: Media history
- Language: English

Publication details
- History: 1980–present
- Publisher: Taylor & Francis (United Kingdom)
- Frequency: Quarterly

Standard abbreviations
- ISO 4: Hist. J. Film Radio Telev.

Indexing
- ISSN: 0143-9685 (print); 1465-3451 (web)

Links
- Journal homepage

The Historical Journal of Film, Radio and Television is an academic journal dedicated to the study of media history. It is published quarterly by Taylor & Francis on behalf of the International Association for Media and History. The current co-editors are Brett Bowles, James Fenwick, Roel Vande Winkel and Agata Zborowska. The book review editor is Veronica Johnson.

Previous editors-in-chief of the HJFRT were Ken Short, David Culbert and James Chapman.

This interdisciplinary journal considers mass media from the perspective of historians and social scientists. It covers the impact of mass communications on 20th century history.

== See also ==
- List of film periodicals
