= John Lynch (historian) =

English historian (1927–2018)

- Born: 11 January 1927; Boldon, County Durham, England
- Died: 4 April 2018 (aged 91)
- Occupation: Historian

Academic background
- Education: University of London
- Doctoral advisor: Robin Humphreys

Academic work
- Institutions: University of Liverpool; University of London

John Lynch (11 January 1927 – 4 April 2018) was an English historian who served as Professor of Latin American History at the University of London. He spent most of his academic career at University College, and then from 1974 to 1987 as Director of the Institute of Latin American Studies. The main focus of his work was Spanish America in the period 1750–1850.

== Life and education ==
John Lynch was born on 11 January 1927 in Boldon, County Durham, in northern England. He married Wendy Kathleen Norman in 1960, both Catholic. They had 5 children.

Lynch studied at the University of Edinburgh (MA, 1952), and at the University of London (Ph.D., 1955). He served in the British Army after World War II from 1945 to 1948. He then taught at the University of Liverpool (1954–61) and, from 1961 taught at the University of London. He was the director for the Institute of Latin American Studies at the University of London from 1974 until his retirement in 1987.

The scope of his work expanded over the years: from the River Plate area to Latin America as a whole; and from the 18th to the 19th centuries.

He died on 4 April 2018 at the age of 91.

== Books ==
- Spanish Colonial Administration, 1782-1810 (Athlone Press 1958)
- Spanish Colonial Administration 1782-1810: The Intendant System in the Viceroyalty of the Rio De La Plata (New York 1958)
- Spain under the Habsburgs (Oxford 1964)
- Spain under the Habsburgs vol. I and II co-author R. A. Humphreys (Oxford 1969)
- The Origins of Latin American Revolutions 1808-1826 (Norton 1973)
- Argentine Caudillo: Juan Manuel de Rosas (Oxford 1980)
- The Spanish American Revolutions 1808-1826 (New York 1986)
- Bourbon Spain, 1700-1808 (Oxford 1989)
- Caudillos in Spanish America, 1800-1850 (Oxford 1992)
- Spain, 1516-1598: from nation state to world empire (Oxford 1992)
- The Hispanic world in crisis and change, 1598-1700 (Oxford 1992)
- Massacre in the Pampas, 1872: Britain and Argentina in the age of migration (Oklahoma 1998)
- Simon Bolivar: A Life (New Haven 2006)
- San Martin: Argentine Soldier, American Hero (New Haven 2009)
- New Worlds: A Religious History of Latin America (Palgrave 2012)
