= Lauren Working =

Lauren Noemie Working is an author and academic. She is a lecturer in Early modern literature and a member of the interdisciplinary Centre for Renaissance and Early Modern Studies at the University of York.

== Career ==
Working studied at the University of St Andrews and Birkbeck College, University of London. She gained a PhD in Early Modern History at the University of Durham in 2015. Her research has focussed on the engagement of early modern Britain with America and its indigenous populations. Her academic monograph, The Making of an Imperial Polity, was published by Cambridge University Press, and jointly won the Royal Historical Society's Whitfield Prize in 2021.

== Publications ==
- A Golden World: How the Americas Transformed Renaissance England (Faber, 2026).
- "James VI and I's Banqueting Houses: A Transatlantic Perspective", British Art Studies, 29 (December 2025). doi:10.17658/issn.2058-5462/issue-29/lworking
- with Emily Stevenson, "Between Ship and Library: Global Knowledge and Spaces of Exchange at the Middle Temple", Emma Rhatigan and Jackie Watson, Mapping the Early Modern Inns of Court: Writing Communities (Palgrave Macmillan, 2025), pp. 263–286.
- "The First General Assembly of Virginia: Deerskin, Ruffs and the View from Tsenacommacah", Transactions of the Royal Historical Society, 3 (2025). doi:10.1017/S0080440125100200.
- "Anna of Denmark", in Nandini Das (ed.), Lives in Transit in Early Modern England: Identity and Belonging (Amsterdam University Press, 2022), pp. 47–54. doi:10.2307/j.ctv2fzkpnj.10
- with Nandini Das, João Vicente Melo, and Haig Z. Smith, Blackamoor/Moor, Keywords of Identity, Race, and Human Mobility in Early Modern England. (Amsterdam, 2021).
- The Making of an Imperial Polity: Civility and America in the Jacobean Metropolis (Cambridge University Press, 2020).
- '"The Savages of Virginia Our Project": The Powhatans in Jacobean Political Thought', Paul Musselwhite (ed.) et al., Virginia 1619: Slavery and Freedom in the Making of English America (University of North Carolina, 2019). doi:10.5149/northcarolina/9781469651798.003.0003
- "Locating colonization at Jacobean Inns of Court", The Historical Journal, 61:1 (March 2018), pp. 29–51. doi:10.1017/S0018246X16000595
