= Whitfield Book Prize =

The Whitfield Book Prize is a prize of £1,000 awarded annually by the Royal Historical Society to the best work on a subject of British or Irish history published within the United Kingdom or Republic of Ireland during the calendar year. To be eligible for the award, the book must be the first history work published by the author.

== History of the prize ==
The prize was founded in 1976 out of the bequest of Archibald Stenton Whitfield. Originally, the prize was £400; five years later, it was increased to £600. Currently, the prize is £1,000.

== Winners and shortlisted writers ==
Source: Royal Historical Society

Ireland and the Great War, written by Niamh Gallagher, became the first book about Irish history to win the prize in 2020.

=== 1970s ===
Whitfield Book Prize winners and finalists, 1977–1979
Year	Author	Title	Result	Ref.
1977	K. D. Brown	John Burns	Winner	
1978	Marie Axton	The Queen's Two Bodies: Drama and the Elizabethan Succession	Winner	
1979	Patricia Crawford	Denzil Holles, 1598–1680: A study of his Political Career	Winner	

=== 1980s ===
Whitfield Book Prize winners and finalists, 1980–1989
Year	Author	Title	Result	Ref.
1980	D. L. Rydz	The Parliamentary Agents: A History	Winner	
1981	Scott M. Harrison	The Pilgrimage of Grace in the Lake Counties, 1536–7	Winner	
1982	Norman Leslie Jones	Faith by Statute: Parliament and the Settlement of Religion, 1559	Winner	
1983	Peter Clark	The English Alehouse: A social history, 1200–1830	Winner	
1984	David Hempton	Methodism and Politics in British Society, 1750–1850	Winner	
1985	K. D. M. Snell	Annals of the Labouring Poor	Winner	
1986	Diarmaid MacCulloch	Suffolk and the Tudors: Politics and Religion in an English County, 1500–1600	Winner	
1987	Kevin M. Sharpe	Criticism and Compliment: The politics of literature in the England of Charles I	Winner	
1988	J. H. Davis	Reforming London, the London Government Problem, 1855–1900	Winner	
1989	A. G. Rosser	Medieval Westminster, 1200–1540	Winner	

=== 1990s ===
Whitfield Book Prize winners and finalists, 1990–1999
Year	Author	Title	Result	Ref.
1990	Duncan M. Tanner	Political change and the Labour party, 1900–1918	Winner	
1991	Tessa Watt	Cheap Print and Popular Piety, 1550–1640	Winner	
1992	Christine Carpenter	Locality and Polity: A Study of Warwickshire Landed Society, 1401 -1499	Winner	
1993	Jeanette M. Neeson	Commoners: common right; enclosure and social change in England, 1700- 1820	Winner	
1994	Vic Gatrell	The Hanging Tree: Execution and the English people, 1770–1868	Winner	
1995	Kathleen Wilson	The Sense of the People: Politics, Culture and Imperialism in England, 1715–1785	Winner	
1996	Paul D. Griffiths	Youth and Authority Formative Experience in England, 1560–1640	Winner	
1997	Christopher Tolley	Domestic Biography: the legacy of evangelicalism in four nineteenth-century families	Winner	
1998	Amanda Vickery	The Gentleman’s Daughter: Women’s Lives in Georgian England	Winner	
1999	John Walter	Understanding Popular Violence in the English Revolution: The Colchester Plunderers	Winner	

=== 2000s ===
Whitfield Book Prize winners and finalists, 2000–2009
Year	Author	Title	Result	Ref.
2000	Adam Fox	Oral and Literate Culture in England, 1500–1700	Winner	
2001	John Goodall	God's House at Ewelme: Life, Devotion and Architecture in a Fifteenth Century Almshouse	Winner	
2001	Frank Salmon	Building on Ruins: The Rediscovery of Rome and English Architecture	Winner	
2002	Ethan H. Shagan	Popular Politics and the English Reformation	Winner	
2003	Christine Peters	Patterns of Piety: Women, Gender and Religion in Late Medieval and Reformation England	Winner	
2004	M.J.D. Roberts	Making English Morals: Voluntary Association and Moral reform in England, 1787–1886	Winner	
2005	Matt Houlbrook	Queer London	Winner	
2006	Kate Fisher	Birth Control, Sex and Marriage in Britain, 1918–1960	Winner	
2007	Stephen Baxter	The Earls of Mercia: Lordship and Power in Late Anglo-Saxon England	Winner	
2007	Duncan Bell	The Idea of Greater Britain: Empire and the Future of World Order, 1860–1900	Winner	
2008	Stephen M. Lee	George Canning and Liberal Toryism, 1801–1827	Winner	
2008	Frank Trentmann	Free Trade Nation: Commerce, Consumption and Civil Society in Modern Britain	Winner	
2009	Nicholas Draper	The Price of Emancipation: Slave-Ownership, Compensation and British Society at the End of Slavery	Winner	

=== 2010s ===
Whitfield Book Prize winners and finalists, 2010–2011
Year	Author	Title	Result	Ref.
2010	Arnold Hunt	The Art of Hearing: English Preachers and their Audiences, 1590–1640	Winner	
2011	Jacqueline Rose	Godly Kingship in Restoration England: The Politics of the Royal Supremacy, 1660–1688	Winner	
2012	Ben Griffin	The Politics of Gender in Victorian Britain: Masculinity, Political Culture and the Struggle for Women's Rights	Winner	
2013	Scott Sowerby	Making Toleration: The Repealers and the Glorious Revolution	Winner	
2014		Dating changed from "year published" to "year of award"		
2015	John Sabapathy	Officers and Accountability in Medieval England 1170-1300	Winner	
2016	Aysha Pollnitz	Princely Education in Early Modern Britain	Winner	
2017	William M. Cavert	The Smoke of London: Energy and Environment in the Early Modern City	Winner	
2017	Alice Taylor	The Shape of the State in Medieval Scotland, 1124-1290	Winner	
2018	Brian N. Hall	Communications and British Operations on the Western Front, 1914-1918	Winner	
2019	Ryan Hanley	Beyond Slavery and Abolition: Black British Writing, c.1770-1830	Winner	

=== 2020s ===
Whitfield Book Prize winners and finalists, 2020–2029
Year	Author	Title	Result	Ref.
2020	Niamh Gallagher (Note: Gallagher published the first ever work on Irish history to win the Whitfield Book prize)	Ireland and the Great War: A Social and Political History	Winner	
2020	Kieran Connell	Black Handsworth: Race in 1980s Britain	Shortlist	
2020	Johanna Dale	Inauguration and Liturgical Kingship in the Long Twelfth Century: Male and Female Accession Rituals in England, France and the Empire	Shortlist	
2020	Frances Houghton	The Veterans’ Tale. British Military Memoirs of the Second World War	Shortlist	
2020	Charlie Laderman	Sharing the Burden. The Armenian Question, Humanitarian Intervention, and Anglo-American Visions of Global Order	Shortlist	
2020	Rob Waters	Thinking Black: Britain, 1964–1985	Shortlist	
2021	Jackson Armstrong	England's Northern Frontier: Conflict and Local Society in the Fifteenth-Century Scottish Marches	Winner	
2021	Lauren Working	The Making of an Imperial Polity. Civility and America in the Jacobean Metropolis	Winner	
2021	Henry Bainton	History and the Written Word: Documents, Literacy, and Language in the Age of the Angevins	Shortlist	
2021	Sarah Goldsmith	Masculinity and Danger on the Eighteenth-Century Grand Tour	Shortlist	
2021	Thomas Leahy	The Intelligence War against the IRA	Shortlist	
2021	Fionnuala Walsh	Irish Women and the Great War	Shortlist	
2022	Kristen D. Hussey	Imperial Bodies in London. Empire, Mobility, and the Making of British Medicine, 1880-1914	Winner	
2022	Emily Baughan	Saving the Children: Humanitarianism, Internationalism, and Empire	Shortlist	
2022	Laura Carter	Histories of Everyday Life: The Making of Popular Social History in Britain, 1918-1979	Shortlist	
2022	Tracy Collins	Female Monasticism in Medieval Ireland: An Archaeology	Shortlist	
2022	Harriet Lyon	Memory and the Dissolution of the Monasteries in Early Modern England	Shortlist	
2022	Sherra Murphy	‘The First National Museum’: Dublin's Natural History Museum in the Mid-Nineteenth Century	Shortlist	
2023	Síobhra Aiken	Spiritual Wounds. Trauma, Testimony and the Irish Civil War	Winner	
2023	James D. Fisher	The Enclosure of Knowledge: Books, Power and Agrarian Capitalism in Britain, 1660–1800	Shortlist	
2023	Sarah Fox	Giving Birth in Eighteenth-Century England	Shortlist	
2023	Kate Gibson	Illegitimacy, Family, and Stigma in England, 1660-1834	Shortlist	
2023	Bronagh Ann McShane	Irish Women in Religious Orders, 1530-1700	Shortlist	
2023	Jonathan R. Topham	Reading the Book of Nature: How Eight Best Sellers Reconnected Christianity and the Sciences on the Eve of the Victorian Age	Shortlist	
2024		To be announced July 2024	Winner	

== See also ==
- Alan Ball Local History Awards
- Gladstone Prize
- List of history awards
- Wolfson History Prize
