= Boswell: Citizen of the World, Man of Letters =

1995 collection of essays on John Boswell

- Cover of first edition
- Author: Irma S. Lustig, editor
- Language: English
- Subject: Literary criticism Literary biography
- Publisher: University of Kentucky Press
- Publication date: 1995
- Publication place: United States
- Media type: Print
- Pages: 270
- ISBN: 0-8131-1910-3

Boswell: Citizen of the World, Man of Letters is a 1995 anthology of scholarly essays on the Scottish biographer and diarist James Boswell, edited by Irma S. Lustig.

== Overview ==
The book contains twelve essays on the life and work of James Boswell, divided into six essays on Boswell and the Enlightenment, five essays on Boswell's Life of Johnson, and an appendix essay, with charts, that provides a new count of Boswell's meetings with Samuel Johnson.

== Reception ==
Boswell: Citizen of the World, Man of Letters received positive reviews from scholars.

Robert Folkenflik in Eighteenth-Century Studies wrote that "Irma Lustig's volume bears a title that divides him into 'citizen of the world' and 'man of letters.' The notion of Boswell as 'citizen of the world' (his own phrase) may seem expansive, given his limitation to Europe and, among other things, his views on slavery, but the actual division of essays turns this into Boswell's connections with the Enlightenment in the first part and The Life of Johnson in the second."

Colby H. Kullman, reviewing the book in Albion: A Quarterly Journal Concerned with British Studies, applauded the book: "Boswell emerges a complicated individual as various ironic paradoxes, dialectical attitudes, and multiple ways of seeing are explored in relation to Boswell's observations about life, never-ending self-analysis, and biographical practice. The uncertainties that often dominate attempted 'readings' of his Life of Johnson help make his masterwork appear to be a contemporary of the great biographies of the twentieth century.... Lustig's collection of essays successfully supports the claims that Boswell's Life of Johnson is more than memory. As conscious artistry, it is a noble creation that evolves from the James Boswell who was a citizen of the world, a man of letters, and a product of the Enlightenment."

Richard B. Sher, considering the trends in Boswell scholarship in Albion: A Quarterly Journal Concerned with British Studies, wrote that "[t]he emergence of James Boswell as a historical subject in his own right can be charted through the evolution of multi-author volumes published over the past decade.... The contemporary likenesses of Boswell that appeared on the covers of the Clingham and Lustig collections have given way to a modern caricature, even further removed from the redoubtable image of Dr. Johnson that graced the cover of Vance's book. It is tempting to say that the evolutionary pattern in recent Boswellian scholarship recapitulates the course of Boswell's own liberation from his famous surrogate father."

James Thompson in SEL: Studies in English Literature 1500–1900 wrote that the book's emphasis seemed mainly biographical: "Only three of the contributions concern literary analysis; the rest are largely biographical and descriptive rather than interpretive. Here too a similar fascination with Boswell's contradictory 'perpetually immature' personality carries over, as does his 'obsession with the father-figure.' Boswell as historical personage rather than Boswell as writer or text is what draws the attention."

== See also ==
- Boswell's Enlightenment

== Sources ==
- Folkenflik, Robert (2000). "Samuel Johnson: The Return of the Jacobites and Other Topics". Eighteenth-Century Studies. 33 (2): 289–299. doi:10.1353/ecs.2000.0008. ISSN 0013-2586. JSTOR 30053692. S2CID 161227471.
- Kullman, Colby H. (1996). "Review of Boswell: Citizen of the World, Man of Letters". Albion: A Quarterly Journal Concerned with British Studies. 28 (4): 698–700. doi:10.2307/4052058. ISSN 0095-1390. JSTOR 4052058.
- Sher, Richard B. (1996). "Review of James Boswell's Psychological Interpretations". Albion: A Quarterly Journal Concerned with British Studies. 28 (3): 496–497. doi:10.2307/4052202. ISSN 0095-1390. JSTOR 4052202.
- Thompson, James (1996). "Recent Studies in the Restoration and Eighteenth Century". SEL: Studies in English Literature 1500–1900. 36 (3): 693–746. doi:10.2307/450806. ISSN 0039-3657. JSTOR 450806.
