= Ryan Hanley =

British Historian

- Board member of: British Society for Eighteenth-Century Studies
- Awards: Alexander Prize; Whitfield Book Prize; Philip Leverhulme Prize

Academic background
- Education: Wilberforce Institute, University of Hull

Academic work
- Discipline: History
- Sub-discipline: Black British Writing
- Institutions: University of Exeter

Ryan Hanley is a British professor of history at the University of Exeter. He specialises in race and slavery in modern Britain, with a focus on the perspectives of people of African descent.

He is notable for being one of only two historians to have been awarded both the Alexander Prize and the Whitfield Book Prize from the Royal Historical Society. In 2023, Hanley was awarded a Philip Leverhulme Prize "for his work on Black British history, history and cultures of British anti-slavery, and class and ‘race’ in Britain."

== Education and academic positions ==
Hanley earned his doctorate in history from Wilberforce Institute for the Study of Slavery and Emancipation at the University of Hull. After obtaining his degree, he worked at the University of Oxford, UCL, and the University of Bristol before taking up a full-time lecturing position at the University of Exeter. He has also had visiting fellowships at Queen Mary University, London and at the Huntington Library in California. He serves as a member of the executive committee for the British Society for Eighteenth-Century Studies.

== Professional career ==
Hanley has published two books and more than twenty chapters and journal articles. His most notable work is that which focuses on the perspectives of those of African descent in Britain, for which he has been awarded both the Whitfield Book Prize and Alexander Prize from the Royal Historical Society. Alongside A. G. Rosser, he is one of only two historians to have received both awards.

He received the Alexander Prize in 2015 for his article Calvinism, Proslavery and James Albert Ukawsaw Gronniosaw. In it, Hanley re-examines Gronniosaw's autobiography within the context of Calvinist and Dutch Reformed confessional networks to better understand how the text could advocate for slavery despite being written by a formerly enslaved author. It portrays Gronniosaw as a Black intellectual, and not simply as an ex-slave. The article was deemed significant enough to feature in the Economic History Review's List of publications on the economic and social history of Great Britain and Ireland published in 2016.

Hanley continued this approach by conducting the first full-length historical study of pre-abolition Black British writing in his 2019 Whitfield Prize-winning book Beyond Slavery and Abolition: Black British Writing, c. 1770–1830. In each of the eight chapters, Hanley provides a case study on a different Black British writer, and categorises them into three sections. Firstly, 'Black Celebrities', containing Ignatius Sancho, Olaudah Equiano/Gustavus Vassa, and Mary Prince. Next, the 'Black Evangelicals', Ukawsaw Gronniosaw, Boston King, and John Jea. Ending with the 'Black Radicals', Ottobah Cugoano and Robert Wedderburn. In his review of the work, Matthew Wyman-McCarthy emphasises the significance of Hanley's choice to frame Black British writers within their authorial 'networks'. He says the book makes strides for scholars who can now holistically approach these individuals as intellectuals, rather than simply abolitionists. He also says that the individual case studies conducted by Hanley deserve their place on undergraduate syllabi.

== Publications ==
=== Books ===
| Year | Title | Publisher | Notes |
|---|---|---|---|
| 2016 | Britain's History and Memory of Transatlantic Slavery | Oxford University Press | Co-authored with Jessica Moody and Katie Donington |
| 2018 | Beyond Slavery and Abolition Black British Writing, c. 1770–1830 | Cambridge University Press | Awarded the Whitfield Book Prize |
| 2025 | Robert Wedderburn: British Insurrectionary, Jamaican Abolitionist | Yale University Press | |

=== Journal articles ===
| Year | Title | Journal | Notes |
|---|---|---|---|
| 2014 | Calvinism, Proslavery and James Albert Ukawsaw Gronniosaw | Slavery & Abolition | |
| 2014 | Biography and the Black Atlantic | Itinerario-International Journal on the History of European Expansion and Global Interaction | |
| 2014 | Affect and Abolition in the Anglo-Atlantic, 1770–1830 | Journal for Eighteenth-Century Studies | |
| 2015 | The Royal Slave: Nobility, Diplomacy and the “African Prince” in Britain, 1748–1752 | Itinerario-International Journal on the History of European Expansion and Global Interaction | |
| 2015 | Invoking Slavery in the Eighteenth-Century British Imagination | Journal for Eighteenth-Century Studies | |
| 2015 | Inhuman Traffick: the International Struggle against the Transatlantic Slave Trade | Social History | |
| 2016 | Slavery and the Birth of the Working-Class Racism in England, 1814–1833 | Transactions of the Royal Historical Society | Awarded the Alexander Prize |
| 2016 | A Radical Change of Heart: Robert Wedderburn's Last Word on Slavery | Slavery & Abolition | |
| 2017 | Slavery Hinterland: Transatlantic Slavery and Continental Europe, 1680–1850 | Social History | |
| 2019 | Black Jokes, White Humour: Africans in English Caricature, 1769–1819 | English Historical Review | |
| 2020 | Children Against Slavery: Juvenile Agency and the Sugar Boycotts in Britain | Transactions of the Royal Historical Society | Co-authored with Kathryn Gleadle |
| 2021 | The Shadow of Colonial Slavery at Peterloo | Caliban | |
| 2021 | Tacky's Revolt: the Story of an Atlantic Slave War by Vincent Brown, and: Black Spartacus: the Epic Life of Toussaint Louverture by Sudhir Hazareesingh | Journal for Eighteenth-Century Studies | Review essay |
| 2021 | Henry Redhead Yorke, Colonial Radical: Politics and Identity in the Atlantic World, 1772–1813, by Amanda Goodrich | English Historical Review | Review essay |
| 2021 | Britain’s Black Past, ed. Gretchen H. Gerzina | English Historical Review | Review essay |
| 2022 | Not Made by Slaves: Ethical Capitalism in the Age of Abolition | Slavery & Abolition | Review essay |

=== Chapters ===
| Year | Title | Book | Notes |
|---|---|---|---|
| 2017 | Introduction | Britain's History and Memory of Transatlantic Slavery | Co-authored with Jessica Moody and Katie Donington |
| 2017 | ‘There to sing the song of Moses’ | Britain's History and Memory of Transatlantic Slavery | |
| 2018 | The Equiano Effect | Migrant Britain | |
| 2019 | Cato Street and the Caribbean | The Cato Street Conspiracy | |
| 2022 | Black Authors and British National Identity, 1763–1791 | African American Literature in Transition, 1750–1800 | |

== Prizes ==
| Year | Award | Institution | Work |
|---|---|---|---|
| 2015 | Alexander Prize | Royal Historical Society | Slavery and the Birth of the Working-Class Racism in England, 1814–1833 |
| 2019 | Whitfield Book Prize | Royal Historical Society | Beyond Slavery and Abolition Black British Writing, c. 1770–1830 |
