= Peter Mandler =

British historian

Peter Mandler FRHistS FBA (born 29 January 1958) is a British historian and academic specialising in 19th and 20th century British history, particularly cultural history and the history of the social sciences. He is Professor in Modern Cultural History at the University of Cambridge and Bailey fellow in History at Gonville and Caius College, Cambridge.

== Biography ==
Mandler was born in 1958 in Boston, Massachusetts. The elder brother of Michael Mandler, he is son of psychologists George Mandler and Jean Mandler who moved their family to La Jolla in 1965 when they joined the UCSD faculty.

After attending Magdalen College, Oxford, as an undergraduate, Mandler completed his PhD at Harvard where he wrote a 1984 dissertation entitled Liberalism and Paternalism: The Whig Aristocracy and the Condition of England, 1830–1852.

Mandler was an assistant professor of history at Princeton University from 1984 to 1991. While there, in 1984 he co-hosted a three-day symposium at Princeton entitled “Socialism in America,” marking the 100th anniversary of the birth of six-time presidential candidate Norman Thomas.

Mandler started teaching in Britain in 1991 at London Guildhall University, and joined the University of Cambridge faculty in 2001. He was President of the Royal Historical Society from 2012 to 2016, and is currently (since 2018) Chair of the Modern History section of the British Academy.

== Research and scholarship ==
Mandler's main research interests are:

- British history since c. 1800, especially cultural, intellectual and social history;
- the history of the humanities and social sciences in Britain and America;
- concepts and methods in cultural history;
- educational history and policy.

In his review of Mandler's 2002 book History and National Life, historian Blair Worden states that Mandler praises the work of professional historians like Simon Schama, Linda Colley and Niall Ferguson, who address a wide audience, in contrast to most specialists of the discipline, who put their very subject at risk by speaking only between themselves. In Mandler' own words, "there is intrinsic value in keeping the springs of knowledge 'clear and untainted' but there is greater value in ensuring that the supply reaches the consumer in something resembling its original state".

Mandler occasionally makes television and radio appearances.

== Works ==
Mandler's is author or editor of the following books:

- Great Philanthropists: Wealth and Charity in the Modern World, 1815-1945 (ed., with David Cesarani) (Vallentine Mitchell, 2017).
- Return from the Natives: How Margaret Mead won the Second World War and lost the Cold War (Yale University Press, 2013).
- From Plunder to Preservation: Britain and the Heritage of Empire, c.1800-1940 (ed., with Astrid Swenson) (British Academy, 2013).
- The English National Character: The History of an Idea from Edmund Burke to Tony Blair (Yale University Press, 2006). Review in The Guardian. Review in The New York Sun.
- Liberty and Authority in Victorian Britain (ed.) (Oxford University Press, 2006)
- History and National Life (Profile Books, 2002). Review in Reviews in History (Institute of Historical Research).
- The Fall and Rise of the Stately Home (Yale University Press, 1997).
- After the Victorians: Private Conscience and Public Duty in Modern Britain: Essays in memory of John Clive (ed., with Susan Pedersen) (Routledge, 1994).
- The Uses of Charity: The Poor on Relief in the 19th-Century Metropolis (ed.) (University of Pennsylvania Press, 1990).
- Aristocratic Government in the Age of Reform: Whigs and Liberals, 1830-1852 (Clarendon Press, 1990).

Academic offices
Preceded by Colin Jones	President of the Royal Historical Society; 2012–2016	Succeeded by Margot Finn
