= Scott Sowerby =

Canadian historian

Scott Sowerby is a Canadian historian and Associate Professor in the Department of History, Northwestern University.

He was awarded a PhD from Harvard University in 2006. His book Making Toleration: The Repealers and the Glorious Revolution was awarded the Royal Historical Society's The Whitfield Prize and was shortlisted for Phi Beta Kappa Society's Ralph Waldo Emerson Award. The book is about James II of England's allies in repealing penal laws against religious minorities (such as the Dissenters and Catholics), a group Sowerby labels the Repealers.

== Works ==
- Making Toleration: The Repealers and the Glorious Revolution (Harvard University Press, 2013).
