= Patricia Marcia Crawford =

Australian historian

Patricia Marcia Crawford FRHistS, FAHA, FASSA (31 January 1941 – 28 April 2009) was an Australian historian of women. She featured in a conference, London's Women Historians, held at the Institute of Historical Research in 2017.

== Life ==
Patricia Marcia Clarke was born in Sydney on 31 January 1941, first child of Enid Fussell and Jim Clarke, who was a marine surveyor. The family moved to Melbourne, where Crawford graduated from the University of Melbourne with a BA (Hons) in 1961. The following year she married anthropologist Ian Crawford and the couple moved to Perth where she enrolled in a PhD (1971) at the University of Western Australia (UWA). In 1972 she became a part-time lecturer at UWA, was made a permanent staff member in 1976 and was appointed professor of history in 1995.

== Selected publications ==
- Denzil Holles 1598–1680: a study of his political career
- "Attitudes to Menstruation in Seventeenth-century England", Past and Present, 1981.
- Women and Religion in England, 1500–1720
- Blood, Bodies and Families in Early Modern England
- Parents of Poor Children in England 1580–1800

== Awards and recognition ==
Crawford's first book, Denzil Holles 1598–1680, won the 1979 Whitfield Prize.

In 1981 Crawford was elected Fellow of the Royal Historical Society (UK), Fellow of the Australian Academy of Social Sciences in 1993 and Fellow of the Australian Academy of the Humanities in 2003.
