= Emma Griffin =

English historian

Emma Griffin FRHistS
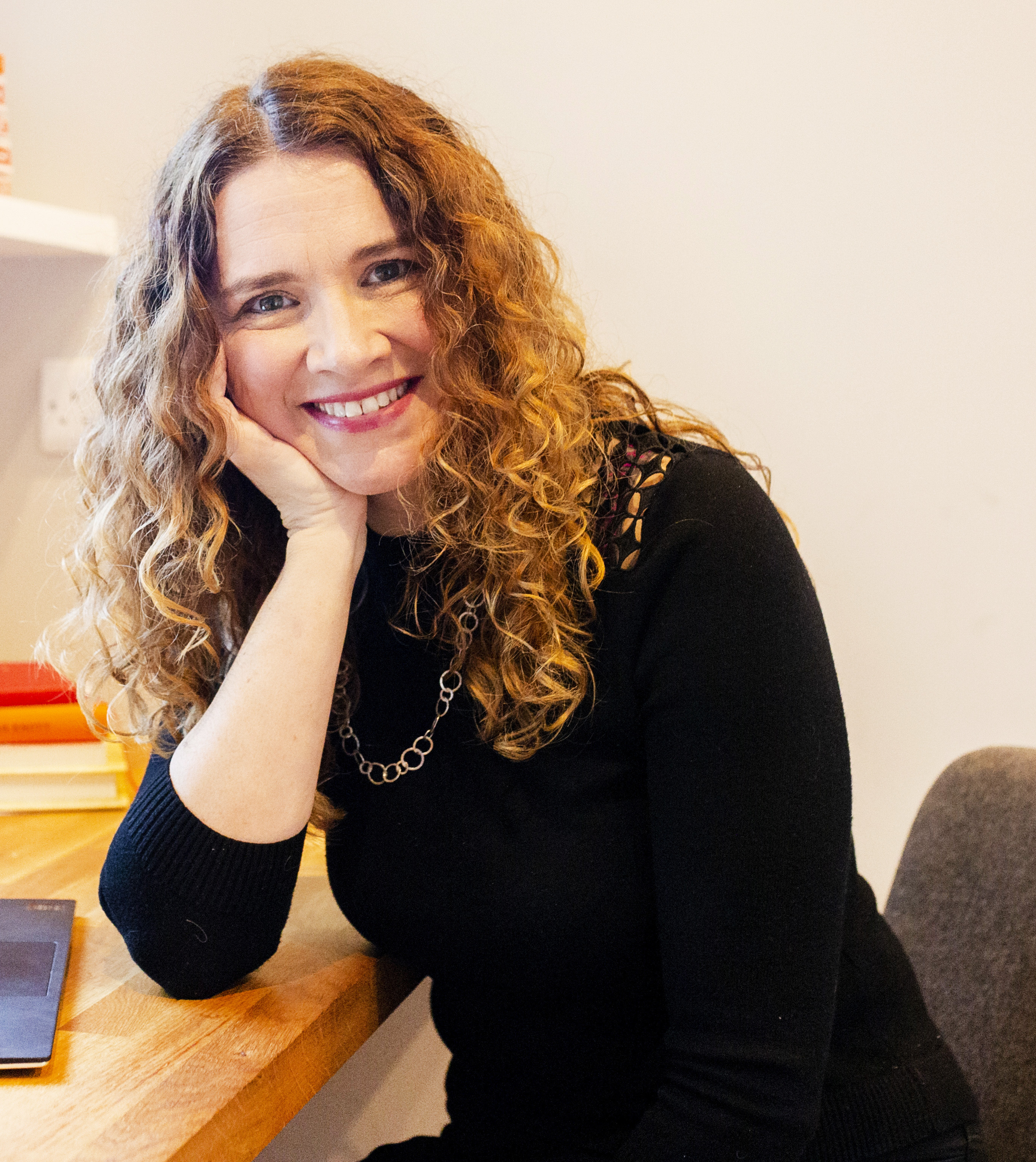
- Griffin in January 2020
- Board member of: President of the Royal Historical Society

Academic background
- Education: University of London (BA); Trinity College, Cambridge (PhD)
- Doctoral advisor: Gareth Stedman Jones

Academic work
- Discipline: History
- Institutions: Queen Mary University of London; University of Cambridge; UEA

Emma Griffin FRHistS is professor of modern British history at Queen Mary University of London with particular interests in the Industrial Revolution and in social and gender history. She was the President of the Royal Historical Society 2020-2024 and she is the author of five books. Her second book, Blood Sport, was awarded the Lord Aberdare Prize for Literary History. She has been editor of the journal History and co-editor of The Historical Journal. She was part of the Living with Machines research project – a multi-disciplinary digital history project based at The Alan Turing Institute and the British Library, which sought to rethink the impact of technology on the lives of ordinary people during the Industrial Revolution.

== Education and academic positions ==
Griffin was educated at the University of London (where she studied history) and the University of Cambridge, having been a member of Trinity College. She held a British Academy postdoctoral fellowship and visiting positions at the University of Paris and Sheffield University before joining the University of East Anglia as a junior lecturer in 2005. She left UEA in 2023 and is now Professor of modern British History at Queen Mary, University of London. Griffin was the editor of History: The Journal of the Historical Association from 2010 to 2018. She has also edited Cultural and Social History served as one of the Literary Directors of the Royal Historical Society, and has been a co-editor of The Historical Journal.

== Professional career ==
Griffin is a widely published historian of modern Britain, best known for her work on the lives of ordinary people in Britain during the Industrial Revolution. She has published five books and several articles in high impact journals, including Past & Present, The American Historical Review and The English Historical Review. She has performed active citizenship for the profession through her extensive editorial work for learned journals and service to learned societies, most notably the Royal Historical Society, of which she was President 2020-2024. She had made regular appearances on radio and television.

=== Earlier work ===
Griffin's early work grew out of her 2000 Cambridge University PhD looking at popular recreation in Britain during the long eighteenth century. This resulted in two books: England’s Revelry: A History of Popular Sports and Pastimes, 1660–1800 (Oxford University Press, 2005) and Blood Sport: A History of Hunting in Britain (Yale University Press, 2007)

=== Liberty’s Dawn: A People’s History of the Industrial Revolution ===
In the 2010s, Griffin's work moved away from popular culture and started to focus on the British Industrial Revolution. In 2010, she published A Short History of the British Industrial Revolution (Palgrave, 2010), in which she argued that the British Industrial Revolution occurred later than has commonly been claimed. Griffin argued that many of the great inventions of the Industrial Revolution were quite traditional in nature, and it was the development of the steam engine and the application of coal to industrial processes that marked the switch towards industrialisation proper. She dated this development to the 1830s, several decades later than many earlier attempts to date the Industrial Revolution.

In 2013, she published Liberty's Dawn: A People's History of the Industrial Revolution (Yale University Press, 2013), in which she turned attention away from the causes and timing of the Industrial Revolution to focus on the impact of industrialisation on the lives and standards of living of ordinary people. She argued against the pessimistic interpretation of the impact of industrialisation on standards of living. She subsequently developed this argument in an article for Past & Present. In this she made the observation that writing about the social consequences of the Industrial Revolution has become increasingly dominated by the field of Economic history. She argued that social and cultural approaches offer a valuable perspective that ought to be included. She took a family perspective and used working-class autobiographies as her evidence. In this way, she argued that traditional economic history methods are not sensitive enough to pick up the reality and complexity of living standards at the individual level.

=== Broadcasting ===
Griffin has appeared regularly on BBC radio and television as a contributor, writer and presenter. She is represented by agents at Knight Ayton and the Wylie Agency.

== Awards and decorations ==
- 2001: Thirlwall Prize and Seeley Medal
- 2005 Lord Aberdare Prize for Sport History for England's Revelry
- 2007 Lord Aberdare Prize for Literary History for Blood Sport
- 2012 AHRC/BBC New Generation Thinkers Award

== Radio and television ==
- 2019: BBC Radio 4: The Motherhood Myth, writer and presenter
- 2018: BBC Radio 4: Mind the Gender Pay Gap, writer and presenter.
- 2018: BBC Radio 4: In our Time (The Workhouse).
- 2018: BBC Radio 3: Freethinking: What happened to the working class?
- 2017: BBC Radio 3: A Reflection on Worrying, writer and presenter
- 2017: BBC Radio 4: Clocking On, writer and presenter
- 2015: BBC Radio 4: Voices of the Industrial Revolution: Women's stories, writer and presenter
- 2015: BBC 1: Who do you Think You Are (Jerry Hall), contributor
- 2015: BBC Radio 4: In Our Time (The American Civil War and Britain)
- 2014: More 4: The Real Mill with Tony Robinson, consultant and co-presenter
- 2014: BBC Radio 4: Voices of the Industrial Revolution, writer and presenter
- 2012: BBC Radio 4: Out Foxed, writer and presenter.

== Selected publications ==
- England's Revelry: A History of Popular Sports and Pastimes, 1660–1800 (Oxford University Press, 2005)
- Blood Sport: A History of Hunting in Britain (Yale University Press, 2007) ISBN 9780300116281
- A Short History of the British Industrial Revolution (Palgrave, 2010) ISBN 9781352003246
- Liberty's Dawn: A People's History of the Industrial Revolution (Yale University Press, 2013) ISBN 9780300205251
- Bread Winner: An Intimate History of the Victorian Economy (Yale University Press, 2020) ISBN 9780300230062

Academic offices
Preceded by Margot Finn	President of the Royal Historical Society; 2020–2024 }
