= Goronwy Edwards =

Welsh historian (1891–1976)

Sir Goronwy Edwards FBA FRHistS
- Edwards in 1965
- Born: John Goronwy Edwards; 14 May 1891
- Died: 20 June 1976 (aged 85)
- Occupations: Historian and academic

Academic background
- Education: Holywell Grammar School; Jesus College, Oxford

Sir John Goronwy Edwards FBA FRHistS (14 May 1891 – 20 June 1976) was a Welsh historian.

== Early life ==
Edwards, who was proficient in Welsh before he could read English, was educated at Holywell Grammar School before matriculating at Jesus College, Oxford, in 1909. His 1913 essay on Danby gained him proxime accessit in the Stanhope prize competition.

== Career ==
After obtaining his degree in 1913, he worked for a time at Manchester University under T. F. Tout.

During the First World War he served with the Royal Welch Fusiliers in France and obtained the rank of captain.

In 1919, he returned to Jesus College as Fellow and Tutor in History, where he specialised in medieval English and Welsh history, serving also as Senior Tutor for 13 years. He was highly regarded as a lecturer, tutor and supervisor of research students. He was joint editor of the English Historical Review from 1938 and was appointed a Fellow of the British Academy in 1943.

He had hoped to be appointed Principal of the college when it fell vacant on the death of Alfred Hazel in 1944. Instead, the decision was taken to appoint Frederick Ogilvie as principal, with Edwards becoming vice-principal.

In 1948 after 29 years as a Fellow of Jesus College, Oxford, Edwards accepted the invitation to become Director of the Institute of Historical Research and Professor of History at the University of London. In addition to his continuing scholarship, he also presided over many committees with, it was said, "exemplary patience".

Outside his university Edwards served on the Royal Commission on the Ancient and Historical Monuments of Wales and the Royal Commission on Historical Manuscripts.

He was knighted in July 1960 shortly before his retirement. In retirement he served as president of the Royal Historical Society from 1961 to 1965 and was awarded the Cymmrodorion medal on his eightieth birthday in 1971 to mark his service to Wales.

== Death ==
He died on 20 June 1976 at the age of 85.

Academic offices
Preceded by David Knowles	President of the Royal Historical Society; 1961–1965	Succeeded by Robert Arthur Humphreys
