= Keith Snell =

Keith David Malcolm Snell, FRAI, is an Anglo-Welsh academic historian who holds a personal chair as Professor of Rural and Cultural History at the University of Leicester. He was born in Tanganyika (now Tanzania), and brought up in rural Wales and many tropical African countries, notably Tanzania, Mozambique, Kenya, Uganda, the Congo, Ghana, and Nigeria. He spoke four African languages.

== Career ==
Keith Snell studied history at Trinity Hall, Cambridge, graduating with a Bachelor of Arts (BA) first-class degree. He remained at the University of Cambridge and, with funding from the Social Science Research Council, completed his doctoral studies at Trinity Hall as well. His Doctor of Philosophy (PhD), supervised by Professor Sir Tony Wrigley at The Cambridge Group for the History of Population and Social Structure, was awarded in 1979.

Snell was then appointed Research Fellow in the Humanities at King's College, Cambridge, 1979–1983, before taking up a lectureship in the Department of Economics and Related Studies at the University of York. Snell then moved to the University of Leicester as Lecturer in Regional Popular Cultures in the university's postgraduate Department of English Local History; he was subsequently promoted to Reader and from 2002 Professor of Rural and Cultural History. He was Director of the Centre for English Local History, University of Leicester, 2009–2018, when he took early retirement. He has since worked in Health Sciences in the University of Leicester on the phenomenon of loneliness. He has supervised 92 PhD students.

In 1991, he was elected a Fellow of the Royal Anthropological Institute of Great Britain and Ireland.

== Research ==
Snell's research is on the social and economic history of modern Britain (1650–2025), including the poor law system and the history of welfare, migration and settlement law, rural history, the history of the community, the history of the family in Britain, the regional novel in Britain and Ireland, the Irish famine, Victorian English and Welsh religion, churchyards and cemeteries, motifs and styles of memorialization, the history of loneliness, and industrialization and folk art.

His work stresses the relevance of history for present concerns: the quality of life, the family economy, unemployment, regional cultures, 'community' and localism, 'belonging', and modern loneliness. Thus he uses archival and other historical sources for new and different ends. He is especially associated with arguments for wider historical meanings and criteria affecting the quality of life; for the historical and geographical diversity of regional cultures in Britain and Ireland, notably focusing upon religion and regional fiction; for the enduring administrative and cultural features of localism and the parish well into British industrialization; and concerning the changing nature of ‘community’, migration, belonging, personal isolation and lone-living over the past three centuries. It is characterised methodologically by high levels of quantification coupled with extensive cultural, literary and qualitative evidence.

He is co-founder and co-editor (from 1990 to 2021) of the Cambridge University Press journal Rural History: Economy, Society and Culture, for which he is now an honorary editor. He has published over 80 academic articles, and his published books include:

=== Books ===
- Spirits of Community: English Senses of Belonging and Loss, 1750–2000 (Bloomsbury, 2016)
- Parish and Belonging: Community, Identity and Welfare in England and Wales, 1700–1950 (Cambridge University Press, 2006)
- (co-editor) Women, Work and Wages in England, 1600–1850 (Boydell & Brewer, 2004)
- The Bibliography of Regional Fiction in Britain and Ireland, 1800–2000 (Ashgate, 2002)
- Rival Jerusalems: the Geography of Victorian Religion (with Paul S. Ell), (Cambridge University Press, 2000)
- (editor) The Regional Novel in Britain and Ireland, 1800–1990 (Cambridge University Press, 1998)
- Edition of Alexander Somerville, Letters from Ireland During the Famine of 1847 (Irish Academic Press, Dublin, 1994). Translated into German as Irlands Grosser Hunger: Briefe und Reportagen aus Irland Während der Hungersnot 1847 (Unvast-Verlag, Munster, 1996).
- Church and Chapel in the North Midlands: Religious Observance in the Nineteenth Century (Leicester University Press, 1991)
- Edition of Alexander Somerville, The Whistler at the Plough: Containing Travels, Statistics and Descriptions of Scenery and Agricultural Customs in Most Parts of England (London, 1989).
- Annals of the Labouring Poor: Social Change and Agrarian England, 1660–1900 (Cambridge University Press, 1985). Winner of the Royal Historical Society's Whitfield Prize; New Society book of the year.

=== Selected articles, chapters ===
- 'The history of loneliness: what we know so far' (2024, with Fred Cooper et al). https://bci-hub.org/documents/history-loneliness-what-we-know-so-far
- ‘Parishes, pandemics and paths to take: post-Covid-19 historical options’, Family and Community History, 25:1 (2022).
- ‘Ronald Blythe: ‘Just a voice for his time’’, Rural History, 32:1 (2021).
- ‘A realist evaluation of loneliness interventions for older people’, Age and Ageing, 50:6 (2021), (with Simon Conroy).
- ‘Angels in English and Welsh churchyard and cemetery memorials, 1660–2020’, Family and Community History, 24:2 (2021), (with Rachael Jones).
- ‘Churchyard memorials, ‘dispensing with God gradually’: rustication, decline of the Gothic and the emergence of Art Deco in the British Isles’, Rural History, 29:1 (2018), (with Rachael Jones).
- ‘The rise of living alone and loneliness in history’, Social History, 42:1 (2017).
- ‘Modern loneliness in historical perspective’, in Ami Rokach (ed.), The Correlates of Loneliness (2016).
- ‘Agendas for the historical study of loneliness and lone living’, The Open Psychology Journal, 8 (2015).
- ‘In or out of their place: the migrant poor in English art, 1740-1900’, Rural History, 24:1 (2013).
- ‘Re-politicising local history’, International Journal of Regional and Local Studies, 9 (2013), (with Richard Jones).
- ‘Churchyard closures, rural cemeteries and the village community in Leicestershire and Rutland, 1800-2010’, Journal of Ecclesiastical History, 63:4 (2012).
- ‘Belonging and community: understandings of `home' and `friends' among the English poor, 1750-1850’, Economic History Review, 65:1 (2012).
- ‘Tolpuddle, Dorset’, in D. Musgrove (ed.), 100 Places that made Britain (2011).
- ‘Parish pond to Lake Nyasa: parish magazines and senses of community’, Family and Community History, 13:1 (2010).
- ‘‘Go with the stream’: H.E. Bates and social change in Northamptonshire and Kent’, Yearbook of the Alliance of Literary Societies, 3 (2010).
- ‘A drop of water from a stagnant pool? Inter-war detective fiction and the rural community’, Social History, 35:1 (2010).
- `Gravestones, belonging and local attachment in England, 1700-2000', Past and Present, 179 (2003).
- `The culture of local xenophobia’, Social History, 28:1 (2003).
- `English rural societies and geographical marital endogamy, 1700-1837’, Economic History Review, 55:2 (2002).
- `The Sunday-school movement in England and Wales: child labour, denominational control and working-class culture', Past and Present, 164 (1999).
- `Famine letters and eye-witness accounts', in G.R. Barterian and D. Evans (eds), Nineteenth-Century Literature Criticism (1998).
- `The regional novel: themes for interdisciplinary research', in K.D.M. Snell (ed.), The Regional Novel in Britain and Ireland, 1800-1990 (1998).
- `Japanese oral history and women's historiography', Oral History, 24 (1996), (with Hiroko Tomida).
- `From the Compton Census of 1676 to the 1851 Census of Religious Worship: religious continuity or discontinuity?', Rural History, 8 (1996), (with Alastair Crockett).
- `The apprenticeship system in British history: the fragmentation of a cultural institution', History of Education, 25 (1996).
- `Japanese women and oral history: European comparison and Japanese development', in G. Daniels and H. Todd (eds), Japanese Information Resources (1994), (with Hiroko Tomida).
- `Deferential bitterness: the social outlook of the rural proletariat in eighteenth and nineteenth century England and Wales', in Michael Bush (ed.), Social Orders and Social Classes in Europe since 1500 (1992).
- `Settlement, poor law and the rural historian: new approaches and opportunities', Rural History, 3 (1992).
- `Pauper settlement and the right to poor relief in England and Wales', Continuity and Change, 6 (1991).
- `Rural History: the prospect before us', in Rural History: Economy, Society, Culture, 1 (1990) (with Liz Bellamy & Tom Williamson).
- `English historical continuity and the culture of capitalism', History Workshop Journal, 27 (1989).
- `Rural history and folklore studies: towards new forms of association', Folklore, 100 (1989).
- `Lone-parent families and the Welfare State: past and present', Continuity and Change, 2 (1987), (with Jane Millar).
- `Parish registration and the study of labour mobility', Local Population Studies, 33 (1984).
- `Proto industrialisation? Cottage industry, social change and the Industrial Revolution', Historical Journal, 27 (1984) (with Rab Houston).
- `Agricultural seasonal unemployment, the standard of living and women's work in the south and east, 1690 1860', Economic History Review, 34:3 (1981).
