= Boswell's Enlightenment =

- Cover of first edition
- Author: Robert Zaretsky
- Language: English
- Subject: Literary biography Literary criticism Cultural history
- Publisher: Belknap Press
- Publication date: 2015
- Publication place: United States
- Media type: Print
- Pages: 278
- ISBN: 978-0674368231

Boswell's Enlightenment is a 2015 study of the Scottish biographer and diarist James Boswell by Robert Zaretsky. In the book, Zaretsky examines Boswell's attempts to grapple with "the great questions dealing with the sense and ends of life, brought into being by the Enlightenment."

== Overview ==
Boswell's Enlightenment focuses on Boswell's Grand Tour of the European continent, when he introduced himself to a number of eminent thinkers and political figures, including Samuel Johnson, Jean-Jacques Rousseau, David Hume, Pasquale Paoli, John Wilkes, and Voltaire. Zaretsky contends that despite the ridiculous figure Boswell was sometimes regarded as, his irrepressible curiosity and desire to ingratiate himself with the leading figures of the day made him a representative figure of the Enlightenment. Zaretsky writes:

Though he sought out and surrounded himself with men and women who were larger than life, Boswell was like us, but only more so. In his great swings of exuberance and enervation, his moments of great insight and great weakness, Boswell not only embodied the enduring doubts and hopes that mark the modern age, but also expressed them with an intellectual honesty and spare artistry no less enduring.

== Reception ==
Boswell's Enlightenment received mostly positive reviews. It was reviewed by major publications in both the United Kingdom and the United States.

Andrew O'Hagan praised Boswell's Enlightenment in New York Review of Books: "Zaretsky helpfully and correctly refuses to see the Enlightenment as having been simply one thing. But for Boswell it was always a movement, or movements, to supplant the certainty of systems with the vagaries of selfhood.... It turns out that Zaretsky's book is a primer for the kind of rationale that makes someone like Boswell, because it shows the force of individual personality on the action of a period. From the best writers of his day Boswell lifted ways of being more thoroughly himself."

O'Hagan went on to describe the importance of Boswell as described in Zaretsky's book:

Boswell is a man of his time, and one is content to follow his intrepid journey out, sponsored by Zaretsky, to see just exactly how his intellectual experience formed the person we came to love—open, self-promoting, self-hating and funny. Boswell changed the game, adding to the art of living on the page. Previous writers have their natures (Pepys does, Defoe does, Montaigne does and so do the Evangelists), but only with Boswell do we begin to observe a new, modern talent for self-adaptation. In Zaretsky's book we see the effect of one great mind upon another, again and again, and thus we see the evolution of Boswell's dazzling prose style.

Stuart Kelly also offered a laudatory review in The Scotsman: "This feels like the first volume of a bigger work. It is about becoming Boswell, not being Boswell, and Zaretsky expertly highlights the points where Boswell examines himself on who he might be or not be. It is an overture more than an opera. But he did eventually decide, and that decision is important, even if he never managed to make his beliefs and his actions ethically aligned."

Steve Donoghue, writing in The Christian Science Monitor, was skeptical about Zaretsky's argument that Boswell was an important Enlightenment figure. "In reality, Boswell's Tour was a thoroughly and typically ramshackle affair that even Zaretsky's spryly readable account can't entirely salvage from coffee house lounging, wine bar sousing, near-constant chambermaid-deflowering ... his behavior during these Grand Tour years was of the same cloth. Casting him as any kind of avatar of the Enlightenment is, to put it mildly, a bit of a stretch."

Kirkus Reviews offered high praise for the book: "This wonderful rendering of Boswell digs deep into his probing, enquiring life and the fast friends he made at every turn."

Publishers Weekly also gave a positive review, but the reviewer regretted that the book did not cover Boswell's whole life:

Boswell’s earnest search for answers to life’s bewildering puzzles continues to fascinate. Zaretsky brilliantly, sometimes movingly, adds to that fascination. It’s frustrating, however, that he leaves his protagonist in mid-life, before Boswell takes up his classic Life of Samuel Johnson. Also, though Zaretsky opens the book with a short, lively critique of Enlightenment scholarship, he doesn’t indicate how, if at all, his portrait of Boswell alters our present knowledge of the era. So convincing are Zaretsky’s observations, so sure his touch, that one wishes for more—a longer, fuller study of his subject.

Fritz Lanham in the Houston Chronicle concluded that "Boswell remains an attractive figure because he wrestled so passionately with doubts and grand questions of life that continue to occupy us, young and old. Boswell’s Enlightenment is a readable, smart, accessible introduction to a self-absorbed but likable young man who reminds us the Age of Enlightenment was also the Age of Exuberance.

James Campbell, writing The Guardian, gave perhaps the most negative review of major publications that considered the book: "Boswell offers the perfect specimen for an old-and-new experiment of the kind that Zaretsky performs: a man at home in the salons of the age of Enlightenment, but one who was scarcely an enlightened thinker.... Though only 288 pages long, Boswell’s Enlightenment has the feeling of being padded out. Zaretsky’s academic background obliges him to insert references to colleagues in the field, as if to give scholarly backing to assertions verging on the obvious.... [R]eaders might ask themselves why they are not reading Boswell’s journal instead."

== See also ==
- Boswell: Citizen of the World, Man of Letters

== Sources ==
- Campbell, James (6 June 2015). "An Ample Faculty for Self-Deception". The Guardian.
- Donoghue, Steve (25 March 2015). "Boswell's Enlightenment posits the bold and bawdy James Boswell as an avatar of his era". Christian Science Monitor.
- Kelly, Stuart (15 February 2015). "Book reviews: Boswell's Enlightenment". The Scotsman.
- "Review of Boswell's Enlightenment by Robert Zaretsky". Kirkus Reviews. 1 January 2015.
- Lanham, Fritz (11 April 2015). "Review: Boswell's Enlightenment by Robert Zaretsky". Houston Chronicle.
- O'Hagan, Andrew (4 June 2015). "He Changed the Game and Dared to Know". New York Review of Books. 62 (10).
- "Review of Boswell's Enlightenment". Publishers Weekly. 26 January 2015.
- Zaretsky, Robert (2015). Boswell's Enlightenment. Cambridge: The Belknap Press of Harvard University Press. ISBN 978-0674368231.
