= George Mandler =

Austrian-born American psychologist (1924–2016)

George Mandler (June 11, 1924 – May 6, 2016) was an Austrian-born American psychologist, who became a distinguished professor of psychology at the University of California, San Diego.

== Career ==
Mandler was born in Vienna on June 11, 1924, the son of a successful Jewish wholesaler. After the German invasion of Austria in 1938, Mandler was sent by his parents to an English boarding school. In 1940, he emigrated with his parents and younger sister to New York. In 1943, Mandler joined the U.S. Army and trained in military intelligence; as a native speaker of German, he helped interrogate Germany prisoners with the 7th Army.

After World War II, he received his B.S. from New York University in 1949, and his Ph.D. degree from Yale University in 1953. Later he studied at the University of Basel and taught at Harvard University and the University of Toronto.

In 1965 he became the founding chair of the Department of Psychology at the University of California at San Diego and the founding Director of the Center for Human Information Processing (CHIP) the home of scientists such as Geoffrey Hinton, Donald A. Norman and David E. Rumelhart. His Festschrift was published in 1991.

He retired in 1994 and also became a visiting professor at University College London. In 2004, UCSD renamed an existing building Mandler Hall in recognition of his contributions to the university. In 2009, he was awarded an honorary doctorate from the University of Vienna.

== Research ==
Mandler was a leader and participant in the so-called cognitive revolution in mid-twentieth century. His contributions related the fields of cognition and emotion and the importance of autonomic feedback, the development and use of organization theory for an understanding of memory storage, recall, and recognition (see "Organization and memory" in Spence & Spence, and, the development of dual process recognition theory, and the revival of the role of consciousness in modern psychology. A consequence of the structural and organizational approach to human information processing (Mandler, 1967) was the postulation of a general limit on the structures of human thought (Mandler, 2013), following Miller's initial foray (1956). Mandler discussed the limit of 4 ± 1 to working memory, categorization, subitizing, and reasoning. In the 1950s, together with S. B. Sarason, he initiated research on test anxiety.

Among his books are Mind and Emotion, Mind and Body, Human Nature Explored, Consciousness Recovered, and A History of Modern Experimental Psychology. He was a Fellow at the Center for Advanced Study in the Behavioral Sciences, received the William James Award from the American Psychological Association (APA), a Guggenheim Fellowship, and Fellowship status in the American Academy of Arts and Sciences, the Society of Experimental Psychologists, and the Cognitive Science Society.

Mandler's professional contributions include the editorship of Psychological Review, Governing Board member and chair of the Psychonomic Society, president of two Divisions of APA (Experimental Psychology and General Psychology), chair of the Council of Editors of APA, chair of the Society for Experimental Psychologists, and founding president of the Federation of Behavioral, Psychological, and Cognitive Sciences.

== Personal ==
While an assistant professor at Harvard, in January 1957 Mandler married Jean Mandler. They had two sons, Peter Mandler and Michael Mandler. He died in London in May 2016 at the age of 91.

== Books by George Mandler ==
- Mandler, G., and Kessen, W. (1959). The Language of Psychology. New York: John Wiley & Sons, Inc.

- Reprinted in Science Editions, 1964. Reprint edition: Huntington, N.Y.: Krieger, 1975.
- Italian edition: Il linguaggio della psicologia. Bologna: Il Mulino, 1977.

- Mandler, Jean M., and Mandler, G. (1964). Thinking: From Association to Gestalt. New York: John Wiley & Sons, Inc.

- Reprint edition: Westport, Conn.: Greenwood Press, 1982.

- Mandler, G. (1975). Mind and Emotion. New York: Wiley. Reprint edition: Melbourne, Florida: Krieger, 1982.

- German edition: Denken und Fühlen. Paderborn: Junfermann, 1980.

- Mandler, G. (1984). Mind and body: Psychology of emotion and stress. New York: Norton.

- Behavioral Sciences Book Club selection, 1985.
- Japanese edition: Seishin Shobo Publishers, 1987.

- Mandler, G. (1985). Cognitive psychology: An essay in cognitive science. Hillsdale, N.J.: Lawrence Erlbaum Associates.
- Mandler, G. (1997). Human nature explored. New York: Oxford University Press.
- Mandler, G. (2002). Interesting times: An encounter with the 20th century. Mahwah, NJ: Lawrence Erlbaum Associates.
- Mandler, G. (2002). Consciousness recovered: Psychological functions and origins of conscious thought. Amsterdam/Philadelphia: John Benjamins.
- Mandler, G. (2007). A history of modern experimental psychology: From James and Wundt to cognitive science. Cambridge, MA: MIT Press. Reprint edition: Prentice-Hall.

== Sources ==
- Baars, B. J. (1986). The cognitive revolution in psychology. New York, N.Y.: Guilford Press.
- Kessen, W., Ortony, A., & Craik, F. (1991). Memories, thoughts, and emotions: Essays in honor of George Mandler. Hillsdale, N.J.: Lawrence Erlbaum Associates.
- Kintsch, W., Miller, J. R., & Polson, P. G. (1984). Method and tactics in cognitive science. Hillsdale, N.J.: Lawrence Erlbaum Associates.
- Mandler, G. (2001). Interesting times: An encounter with the 20th century, 1924-. Mahwah, NJ: Larry Erlbaum Associates.
