= Jean Mandler =

American psychologist (1929–2025)

- Born: Jean Matter; November 6, 1929; Oak Park, Illinois, U.S.
- Died: March 14, 2025 (aged 95)

Academic background
- Education: Swarthmore College (BA); Harvard University (PhD)

Academic work
- Discipline: Cognitive scientist
- Sub-discipline: Animal learning, developmental problems
- Institutions: University of California, San Diego

Jean Matter Mandler (November 6, 1929 – March 15, 2025) was an American psychologist who was a Distinguished Research Professor of Cognitive Science at the University of California, San Diego and visiting professor at University College London.

== Background ==
Jean Matter was born in Oak Park, Illinois on November 6, 1929. She attended Carleton College before transferring to Swarthmore College, where she graduated summa cum laude in 1951. Mandler received her Ph.D. in psychology at Harvard University in 1956. After a series of research positions – common for women in the 1950–1960s – at Harvard, the University of Toronto, and at UCSD, she became an associate professor at UCSD in 1973 and professor in 1977; she retired as a research professor in 2000. In 1986 she was one of the founding members of the Department of Cognitive Science.

== Research ==
Mandler's early research was on animal learning and in the 1960s she worked on textual analysis, including the development of a widely used story grammar. Starting in the 1970s she turned to developmental problems with special emphasis on early conceptual development which culminated in her influential book on the foundations of mind. In 2006 the book received the "Eleanor Maccoby Outstanding Book Award" from the Division of Developmental Psychology, APA, and in 2007 the "Best Authored Book Award" from the Cognitive Development Society. In 2007 she was also given the American Psychological Association's "Distinguished Scientific Contribution Award".

She was a Fellow of the American Academy of Arts and Sciences and of the Society of Experimental Psychologists. Mandler was active on the editorial board of several developmental journals.

== Personal life and death ==
In 1957, Jean Matter married George Mandler, one of her Harvard professors. The couple later had two sons, Peter Mandler (Professor of Modern Cultural History at the University of Cambridge) and Michael Mandler (Professor of Economics at Royal Holloway College, University of London, UK). George Mandler died in 2016, and Jean Mandler died on March 15, 2025, at the age of 95.

== Books by Jean Mandler ==
- Mandler, J. M., & Mandler, G. (1964). Thinking: From Association to Gestalt. New York: Wiley.
- Mandler, J. M. (1984). Stories, scripts, and scenes: Aspects of schema theory. Hillsdale, NJ: Lawrence Erlbaum Associates.
- Mandler, J. M. (2004). The foundations of mind: The origins of conceptual thought. New York: Oxford University Press.

== Sources ==
- Carey, S. (2000) The origin of concepts. Journal of Cognition and Development, 1, 37–41.
- Stein, N. L., Bauer, P. and Rabinowitz, M. (2002) Representation, memory and development: Essays in honor of Jean Mandler. Mahwah, NJ: Lawrence Erlbaum Associates.
- Reznick, J.S. & Bauer, P. J. Constructing a Mind, One Image Schema at a Time. Journal of Cognition and Development, 9, 253–255. doi:10.1080/15248370802022761
