= Susan Pedersen (historian) =

Canadian historian

- Awards: Guggenheim Fellowship (2005)

Academic background
- Education: Radcliffe College; Harvard University

Academic work
- Discipline: Historian
- Institutions: Columbia University

Susan Pedersen is a Canadian historian and Gouverneur Morris Professor of History at Columbia University. Pedersen focuses on 19th and 20th century British history, women's history, settler colonialism, and the history of international institutions.

== Life ==
Born in Tokyo, Japan, in 1959 to Canadian missionary parents, she received her B.A. (1982) from Radcliffe College and both her M.A. (1983) and Ph.D (1989) from Harvard University, where she was also a professor and served as the Dean of Undergraduate Education. In the latter position, she defended the university against charges of excessive grade inflation.

Pedersen was a Harvard Radcliffe Institute fellow for 2002–2003 and joined the Columbia University faculty in 2003. Among her works is a biography of Eleanor Rathbone and a book on the League of Nations mandate system. In 2005 she was awarded a Guggenheim Fellowship.

Susan Pedersen was a Bosch Fellow in Public Policy at the American Academy in Berlin for Spring 2009. She received the Great Teacher Award from the Society of Columbia Graduates in 2014. Her book The Guardians received the Cundill History Prize in 2015. She was elected to the American Academy of Arts and Sciences in 2016 and elected a fellow of the British Academy in 2020. In the fall of 2021, she was a fellow at the Swedish Collegium for Advanced Study.

== Works ==
=== Books ===
- Pedersen, Susan (1993). Family, Dependence, and the Origins of the Welfare State: Britain and France, 1914-1945. Cambridge University Press. ISBN 978-0-521-55834-1.
- Clive, John Leonard; Pedersen, Susan; Mandler, Peter, eds. (1994). After the Victorians: Private Conscience and Public Duty in Modern Britain. Routledge. ISBN 978-0-415-07056-0.
- Pedersen, Susan (2004). Eleanor Rathbone and the Politics of Conscience. Yale University Press. ISBN 978-0-300-10245-1.
- Elkins, Caroline; Pedersen, Susan, eds. (2005). Settler Colonialism in the Twentieth Century: Projects, Practices, Legacies. New York: Routledge. ISBN 978-0-415-94924-8.
- Pedersen, Susan (2015). The Guardians: The League of Nations and the Crisis of Empire. Oxford University Press. ISBN 978-0-19-957048-5.

=== Selected articles ===
- —— (January 1986). "Hannah More Meets Simple Simon: Tracts, Chapbooks, and Popular Culture in Late Eighteenth-Century England". Journal of British Studies. 25 (1). doi:10.1086/385855.
- —— (October 1990). "Gender, Welfare, and Citizenship in Britain during the Great War". The American Historical Review. 95 (4). doi:10.1086/ahr/95.4.983.
- —— (December 1991). "National Bodies, Unspeakable Acts: The Sexual Politics of Colonial Policy-making". The Journal of Modern History. 63 (4). doi:10.1086/244384.
- —— (18 July 2024). "The Messiah of Cadoxton". Granta. No. 168.
- —— (19 March 2026). "Men explain Epstein to me". London Review of Books. Vol. 48, no. 5.
