= Emile Chabal =

British historian

- Born: 1983 (age 42–43)
- Occupations: Professor of Contemporary History, University of Edinburgh

Academic background
- Education: University of Cambridge (BA, MPhil, PhD)
- Thesis: Republicanism, Liberalism, and the Search for the Political Consensus in France, c.1980-c.2010 (2011)

Academic work
- Discipline: History
- Sub-discipline: Contemporary history; History of Europe; intellectual history; political history; History of France (1900–present)
- Institutions: University of Oxford; University of Edinburgh
- Website: emilechabal.com

Emile Chabal (born 1983) is a British historian specialising in twentieth-century European intellectual and political history. He is currently Professor of Contemporary History at the University of Edinburgh, and previously held teaching and research positions at St John's College, Cambridge, and Balliol College, Oxford.

== Education ==
Chabal received his BA in History from the University of Cambridge in 2005, and then studied for a year at Rice University as a CD Broad Scholar. He returned to Cambridge to complete an MPhil in Historical Studies, graduating in 2007, and continued there for a PhD. During his doctoral research, Chabal was a Kennedy Scholar at Harvard University and a visiting student at the École Normale Supérieure in Paris. He completed his PhD in 2011, and was awarded the History Faculty's Prince Consort & Thirlwall Prize and Seeley Medal for the best doctoral dissertation across all periods.

== Career ==
Following his PhD, Chabal took up a post as department lecturer in modern European history at the University of Oxford, attached to Balliol College. In 2012, he began a year-long research fellowship at St John's College, Cambridge. In 2013, he was appointed Chancellor's Fellow in History at the University of Edinburgh, promoted to Reader in 2018 and to Professor of Contemporary History in 2024.

Chabal's research has focused on modern and contemporary French and European politics, and migration and citizenship in Western Europe. Since 2015, he has led an ongoing project into the intellectual life and history of Eric Hobsbawm. In 2021, he launched the Eric Hobsbawm Bibliography, a fully-searchable database of Hobsbawm's published and unpublished works. He published an intellectual biography of Hobsbawm with Harvard University Press in 2026.

He is currently an editor of Contemporary European History.

== Publications ==
Chabal's publications include;

As author:

- Chabal, Emile (2015). A Divided Republic: Nation, State and Citizenship in Contemporary France. Cambridge; New York: Cambridge University Press. ISBN 978-1-107-06151-4.
- Chabal, Emile (2020). France. Polity Histories. Cambridge, UK; Medford, MA: Polity Press. ISBN 978-1-5095-3001-4.
- Chabal, Emile (2026). The Age of Hobsbawm: The Life of a Revolutionary Historian. Cambridge, Massachusetts: Belknap Press of Harvard University Press. ISBN 978-0-674-30539-7.

As editor:

- Britain and France in Two-World Wars: Truth, Myth and Memory, Bloomsbury Academic, 2013 (co-edited with Robert Tombs)
- France since the 1970s: History, Politics and Memory in an Age of Uncertainty, Bloomsbury Academic, 2014
- States of Ignorance: Governing Irregular Migrants in Western Europe, Cambridge University Press, 2023
