= Nandini Das =

British literary historian

Professor Nandini Das OBE FBA
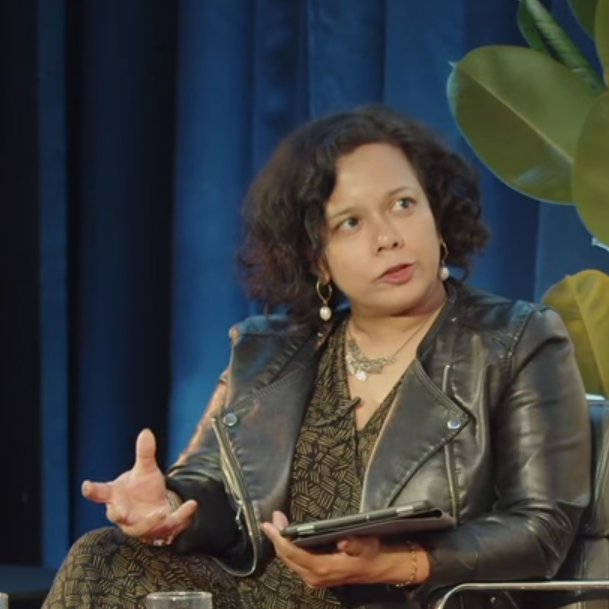
- Das in 2025 at the British Museum
- Born: 1974 (age 51–52); Kolkata, West Bengal, India
- Occupations: Academic and literary scholar
- Title: Professor of Early Modern Literature and Culture

Academic background
- Education: Jadavpur University; University College, Oxford; Trinity College, Cambridge
- Thesis: Romance and the development of prose fiction in Renaissance England

Academic work
- Discipline: English studies
- Sub-discipline: Renaissance studies; Travel literature; English Renaissance theatre; Cultural history
- Institutions: University of Liverpool; Exeter College, Oxford

Nandini Das FBA (born November 1974) is professor of Early Modern Literature and Culture in the English faculty at the University of Oxford. She is a specialist in Shakespeare studies, Renaissance romance writing, early travel literature, and encounters between different cultures. She was elected a Fellow of the British Academy in 2026.

== Early life ==
Nandini Das grew up in India and studied the sciences at school, and after working as a software programmer in the publishing industry for a year, decided to return to academic research. Aged about 10, she was inspired by seeing Vanessa Redgrave in William Shakespeare's As You Like It on Indian television. She earned a BA in English from Jadavpur University in Kolkata, India, after which she moved to Britain on a Rhodes scholarship to study English at University College, Oxford (BA). She subsequently earned her M.Phil and PhD at Trinity College, Cambridge.

== Career ==
Das was professor of English literature at the University of Liverpool until October 2019, when she became a Tutorial Fellow at Exeter College, Oxford and Professor of Early Modern Literature and Culture in the English faculty at Oxford. Her research relates to cultural and intellectual history for the period 1600 to 1750 including fiction, accounts of early travel and encounters between different cultures.

She has edited a scholarly edition of Robert Greene's Planetomachia (1585) in 2007 and is the volume editor for Elizabethan Levant trade and South Asia of Richard Hakluyt's 'Principall Navigations, Voyages, Traffikes, and Discoveries of the English Nation.

She is project director of the Travel, Transculturality and Identity in England, c.1550-1700 (TIDE) project.

She is a fellow of the Higher Education Academy, a member of the council of Research England, and a member of the Peer Review College of Britain's Arts and Humanities Research Council. Das is also a trustee and council member of the Society for Renaissance Studies. In 2025 she was elected a fellow of the English Association.

In September 2018, she presented Tales of Tudor Travel: The Explorer's Handbook on BBC Four. She has appeared as an expert commentator in the historical documentaries Henry VIII (2020) for Channel 5 and The Boleyns: A Scandalous Family (2021) for BBC Two.

== Honours and awards ==
Das' book Courting India: England, Mughal India and the Origins of Empire won the 2023 British Academy Book Prize. It was also shortlisted for the 2024 Wolfson History Prize.

Das was appointed an Officer of the Most Excellent Order of the British Empire in the 2025 New Year Honours for services to interdisciplinary research in the humanities and public engagement. In December 2025, a portrait of Das was unveiled by the Bodleian Library and the British Journal of Photography as part of their Catalysts series, celebrating "Oxford University's leading innovators whose work is reshaping health, society, and the environment worldwide." In 2026, Das was elected Fellow of the British Academy (FBA), the United Kingdom's national academy for the humanities and social sciences.

== Selected publications ==
- Nandini Das (2026). This Little World: A New History of Tudor and Stuart England. Bloomsbury. ISBN 9781526669650.
- Nandini Das (2023). Courting India: England, Mughal India and the Origins of Empire. Bloomsbury. ISBN 9781526615640.
- Nandini Das, ed. (2022). Lives in Transit in Early Modern England: Identity and Belonging. Amsterdam: Amsterdam University Press. ISBN 9789463725989.
- Nandini Das; João Vicente Melo; Haig Z. Smith; Lauren Working (2021). Keywords of Identity, Race, and Human Mobility in Early Modern England. Amsterdam: Amsterdam University Press. ISBN 9789463720748.
- Nandini Das; Tim Youngs, eds. (2018). The Cambridge History of Travel Writing. Cambridge: Cambridge University Press. ISBN 9781316556740.
- Nandini Das, ed. (2017). Hakluyt's Principall Navigations, Voyages, Traffikes, and Discoveries of the English Nation, 1598-1600. Volume VI: Elizabethan Levant Trade and South Asia. Oxford: Oxford University Press.
- Nandini Das; Nick Davis, eds. (2016). Enchantment and Dis-enchantment in Shakespeare and Early Modern Drama. Routledge. ISBN 9780367175764.
- Nandini Das; John Batchelor, eds. (2011). Travel and Prose Fiction in Early Modern England. Yearbook of English Studies. Leeds: MHRA. ISBN 9781907322235.
- Renaissance Romance: The Transformation of English Prose Fiction, 1570-1620. Farnham: Ashgate. 2011. ISBN 9781409410133.
- Nandini Das (2007). Nandini Das (ed.). Robert Greene's Planetomachia. Aldershot: Ashgate. ISBN 9781315244037.
