= Institute for the Study of the Americas =

The Institute for the Study of the Americas (ISA) was established in 2004 following a merger of the Institute of Latin American Studies and the Institute of United States Studies. ISA formed part of the University of London’s School of Advanced Study along with nine other research institutes. In 2013, the Institute of Latin American Studies was re-established in order to focus the support provided to scholars of Latin America. Activities pertaining to the study of the United States continue within the School of Advanced Study under the direction of the Institute of English Studies and Institute of Historical Research.
