= Contemporary European History =

- Discipline: History of Europe from 1914
- Language: English

Publication details
- History: 1992–present
- Publisher: Cambridge University Press (United Kingdom)
- Frequency: Quarterly
- Impact factor: 0.962 (2021)

Standard abbreviations
- ISO 4: Contemp. Eur. Hist.

Indexing
- ISSN: 0960-7773 (print); 1469-2171 (web)
- LCCN: 92660049
- JSTOR: 09607773
- OCLC no.: 237351536

Links
- Journal homepage; Online access; Online archive

Contemporary European History is an international peer-reviewed academic history journal founded in 1992 and published quarterly by Cambridge University Press. The journal covers the history of Europe from 1914 onwards and publishes three main types of article: research articles, review articles, and Spotlight essays. It regularly publishes forums - known as 'collections' - under the guidance of one or more guest editors.

The journal also publishes two blogs - The Contemporary European History Blog, designed to complement journal articles, and New Voices, written by postgraduate students and early-career scholars.

== History ==
Contemporary European History launched in March 1992. The original editors were Kathleen Burk and Dick Geary. The first issue noted:

It is an exciting thing to launch a new journal, and in this case it reflects the fact that we in Europe are living in interesting times. We are clearly on the brink of a new Europe: 1992 will see the United Kingdom and Ireland more fully integrated into the European Community, and glasnost has set in train unknown but certainly far-reaching changes in the USSR and Eastern and East Central Europe. Beyond this, year by year the concept of Europe as both a geographical and an historical entity becomes more credible, and there is increasing interest, not only in the histories of individual countries, but in how their histories compare with each other.

The journal was established to cover 'European history in its widest sense', defined as continental Western Europe, Eastern Europe, and the United Kingdom. It sought to publish articles across all major historical areas, spanning political, social, economic, cultural and diplomatic history, as well as comparative and transnational approaches - a remit which continues to this day.

In recent years, the journal has expanded its focus to include coverage of the histories of Europe's overseas empires. The journal regularly features contributions from scholars outside the Anglophone community and acts as a channel of communication between European historians throughout the continent and beyond it.

From the outset, the journal has devoted at least one issue per year to a particular historical theme. Recent examples have included European Cultural Diplomacy and the Twenty Years' Crisis, Religion and Socialism in the Long 1960s, Transnational Anti-Fascism, and Alcohol Production and Consumption in Contemporary Europe.

From 2 July 2025, all articles in the journal will be published Open Access, irrespective of an author's institutional affiliation or access to funding.

=== Contemporary European History Prize ===
In 2021, the journal established a prize aimed at PhD students and early-career scholars, inviting submissions on any topic within the journal's scope. The winner receives publication in the journal and £400 worth of Cambridge University Press books.

=== New Voices ===
In May 2024, the journal launched a blog series entitled New Voices, with the stated aim of offering a platform for postgraduate students and early-career scholars to write about their research in a publicly-accessible way. The blogs are published through the Cambridge University Press online platform, Cambridge Core, and are advertised on the journal's social media channels.

== Current editors ==
Contemporary European History is currently edited by:

- Professor Emile Chabal (University of Edinburgh)
- Dr Siobhán Hearne (University of Manchester)
- Dr Michelle Lynn Kahn (University of Richmond)
- Dr Nikolaos Papadogiannis (University of Stirling)

=== Recent Former Editors ===
- Professor Quinn Slobodian (Boston University)
- Professor Celia Donert (University of Cambridge)
- Dr Eirini Karamouzi (University of Sheffield/American College of Greece)
