= Dick Geary =

British historian (1945–2021)

Dick Geary (born Richard John Geary; December 1945 – 21 February 2021) was a British historian.

== Career ==
He studied at City of Leicester Boys' Grammar School and King's College, Cambridge, graduating with a degree in History in 1967.

Geary's field of research was the European labour movement and the intellectual history of Marxism. He specialized in German History, including the German Empire since 1871, the Weimar Republic and Nazism. More recently Dick Geary developed a second research focus on the history of slavery. His methods included both social history and comparative studies.

During his career Dick Geary worked at King's College, Cambridge and Lancaster University, where he was responsible for the Department of German Studies. He was one of the two original editors of Contemporary European History, an academic journal specialising in the history of Europe from 1918 onwards. Until his retirement in 2010 he was director of the institute on the History of Slavery at the University of Nottingham.

Geary died on 21 February 2021.

== Selected works ==
- European Labour Protest 1848–1939 (London: Croom Helm, 1981).
- Karl Kautsky (Manchester: Manchester University Press, 1987).
- (editor) Labour and Socialist Movements in Europe before 1914 (Oxford: Berg Publishers, 1989).
- European Labour Politics from 1900 to the Depression (Basingstoke: Macmillan, 1991).
- Hitler and Nazism (London: Routledge, 1993).
