= Prince Consort & Thirlwall Prize and Seeley Medal =

Annual history prize awarded by the University of Cambridge

The Prince Consort & Thirlwall Prize and Seeley Medal is a prize awarded annually by the Faculty of History at the University of Cambridge for the doctoral dissertation submitted in the previous academic year which is deemed by the Faculty's judging panel to be the best. The prize is one of the university's oldest and is considered the most prestigious accolade for doctoral work within the Faculty.

As of May 2025, the prize is valued at £1,500 and is drawn from the Prince Consort and Thirlwall Prize Fund, which also offers studentships and grants to PhD students, and hardship funding for fourth-year PhD students.

== History ==
The prize is the result of a merger between the Prince Consort Prize, the Thirwall Prize, and the Seeley Medal. From 1904, the Prince Consort Prize and Thirlwall Prize were awarded in alternate years for the best doctoral dissertation.

The Seeley Medal emerged from an attempt, in 1896, to create a Memorial Fund in memory of John Robert Seeley, a former Regius Professor of History at the Faculty, who had died the previous year. The organisers were unsuccessful in raising their target of £3,000 to offer a postgraduate scholarship "to encourage the study of English and foreign archives bearing upon modern international history"; only £635 was raised, which was eventually designated for the Seeley Medal to reward exceptional historical scholarship. Prior to its merger with the Prince Consort and Thirlwall Prizes, the Seeley Medal was only awarded sporadically.

== List of past winners ==
The following is an incomplete list of past winners. The year given is the year in which the prize was awarded; the dissertations to which they refer were submitted in the previous years.

Year	Names of recipients	Title of doctoral dissertation
2025	Elena Zheng	The Politics of Belief in Hume and Enlightenment Scepticism
2024	Edward Everett	Sanctuary in Sixteenth-Century England
2024	Kate Falardeau	The Manuscript Circulation and Use of Bede’s Martyrology and Religious Practice in Carolingian and Post-Carolingian Europe, to c. 1250
2023	Charlotte Johann	Friedrich Carl von Savigny and Politics of Legal Pluralism in Germany, ca. 1810–1847
2023	Tamara Fernando	Of Molluscs and Men: Pearling Labour and Environments in the Northern Indian Ocean 1880–1925
2022	Daniel Allemann	Slavery and Empire in Iberian Scholastic Thought, c.1539-1682
2022	Samuel Sokolsky-Tifft	The Problem of Guilt: Heidegger, Merleau-Ponty, Fanon, and Glissant
2021	Sara Caputo	Foreign Seamen and the British Navy, 1793–1815
2021	Jake Subryan Richards	Liberated Africans and Law in the South Atlantic, c.1839–1871
2020	Freddy Foks	Social Anthropology and British Society: c.1920–1975
2020	Chika Tonooka	Japanese 'Civilisation' and Ideas of Progress in Britain, c.1880–1945
2012	Emile Chabal	Republicanism, Liberalism, and the Search for the Political Consensus in France, c.1980–c.2010
2005	Ben Griffin	
2001	Emma Griffin	Popular Sports and Celebrations in England, 1660–1840
2000	David Stone	The Management of Resources on the Demesne Farm of Wisbech Barton 1314–1430
1999	Jonathan Walker	Honour and the Culture of Male Venetian Nobles, c. 1500–1650
1988	George Garnett	
1961	David Loades	
