= Kathleen Burk =

Professor Emerita of Modern and Contemporary History

Kathleen Mildred Burk (born March 1946) is Professor Emerita of Modern and Contemporary History at University College London. Her field of research is international history, especially politics, diplomacy and finance.

== Early life and career ==
Burk grew up in a California grape farming family. She has undergraduate degrees from University of California at Berkeley and Oxford University at St Hugh's College, and a D.Phil. from Oxford University, where she studied under A. J. P. Taylor. Her early books focused on economic diplomacy and were driven by her insight that “While governments come and go, the need for money is inexorable.”

After finishing her studies, she was Tutorial Assistant in Modern History at Dundee University (1976–77). From 1977–1980 she was a Rhodes Research Fellow at Oxford. From 1980-1992 she was a Lecturer in History and Politics at Imperial College London. She started at University College London in 1990–1992, becoming Reader in Modern and Contemporary History in 1993 and a Professor in 1995. In the mid-nineties, only 7 per cent of the professors there were women.

A 2013 issue of the academic journal Diplomacy & Statecraft was devoted to essays in her honour. She is a fellow of the Norwegian Academy of Science and Letters.

== Subject matter ==
Burk founded the journal Contemporary European History in 1992, taking the role of editor for the first 13 years. In the 1980s, with two colleagues she founded The Historians' Press which ran for 25 years.

In addition to her main field of research, Burk is a freelance writer on wine and has a diploma in wine and spirits from the London Wine & Spirit Education Trust.

In October 2023, Burk discussed The Federalist Papers on BBC Radio 4's In Our Time and has previously spoken on the programme about Franco-American Alliance (2021), Congress of Vienna (2017), Thomas Paine's Common Sense pamphlet (2016), the California Gold Rush (2015), the War of 1812 (2013), Custer's last stand (2011), Thomas Edison (2010), Thoreau and the American Idyll (2009), the Statue of Liberty (2008) and the Pilgrim Fathers (2007).

== Other work ==
She was on the governing body of Abingdon School from 2001 to 2013.

Writes for Wine Behind the Label.

== Publications ==
- Burk, Kathleen (2018), The Lion & The Eagle : The Interaction of the British and American Empires 1783-1972, Bloomsbury Publishing, ISBN 978-1-4088-5617-8
- Burk, Kathleen (2014), War and the State (RLE The First World War) : The Transformation of British Government, 1914-1919, Routledge Library Editions: The First World War., Taylor and Francis, ISBN 978-1317700333
- Burk, Kathleen (2014), Britain, Routledge, ISBN 9781306708364
- Burk, Kathleen (2009), Old World, New World : Great Britain and America from the Beginning, Grove Press, ISBN 978-0802144294
- Burk, Kathleen; Bywater, Michael (2008), Is this Bottle Corked? : The Secret Life of Wine, Harmony Books, ISBN 978-0307462916
- Burk, Kathleen (2002), Troublemaker : The Life and History of A. J. P. Taylor, New Haven, ISBN 9780300094534
- Burk, Kathleen; Stokes, Melvyn (1999), The United States and the European alliance since 1945, Oxford, OCLC 606324961
- Burk, Kathleen (1997), We Are Down on our Knees to the Americans : Anglo-American relations in the Twentieth Century, Printed by Central Services, University College London, OCLC 941053033
- Burk, Kathleen (1988), The First Privatisation : The Politicians, the City and the Denationalisation of Steel, Historians', ISBN 9780950890074
- Burk, Kathleen (1982), War and the State. The Transformation of British Government, 1914–1919. Edited by Kathleen Burk, Allen & Unwin, OCLC 848258495
