= The Juridification of Resource Conflicts =

The Juridification of Resource Conflicts is a British Academy-funded research project which explores the uses of the jural by a range of actors in Central America and Mexico to advance their views about development and natural resource governance in the context of violent conflict over subsoil resources (specifically minerals) and water. The project spans the fields of political anthropology, socio-legal studies and political ecology.

The Juridification of Resource Conflicts has researched mining projects in El Salvador, Guatemala, Honduras, Nicaragua and Mexico where equitable and sustainable development is hindered by extremely high levels of inequality, violence and impunity. Environmental politics involves not only the resource-rich territories that provide a habitat and/or livelihood for local populations, but also a plurality of incommensurable moralities, forms of knowledge and ontologies vis-à-vis the environment, natural resources, extraction, rights, sovereignty and development.

Disputes over natural resources and their management have increasingly assumed a law-like shape and have been channelled through legal and quasi-legal arenas, such as civil and criminal courts, arbitration tribunals, popular tribunals, consultations emulating legally-binding plebiscites, grassroots forms of lawmaking, and international human rights institutions. As such, this project explores the development of juridification, that is, the legal framing of resource conflicts.

A key element of the project has been the development of The Legal Cultures of the Subsoil Database. This is an open-access digital repository of legal instruments and practices used by a range of stakeholders, such as grassroots community groups, civil society organisations, governments and corporations, to assert their claims over territory and resource governance. In the context of environmental politics challenging the implementation of extractive projects, the database takes a broad-based approach to reflect the universe of available legal and legal-like repertoires, and related political actions. It focuses on the following domains: (i) transnational and multilateral judicial institutions and quasi-judicial norms; (ii) domestic courts, administrative bodies, and legislation; and (iii) para-legal actions and law-like actions that occur outside of formal legal arenas.

The database is intended as a practical resource for human rights lawyers, researchers, activists, policy-makers, global organisations, members of the business community, civil society actors, and others interested in resource-related conflicts and human rights violations. It contains information on eight mining projects: El Dorado (El Salvador), Cerro Blanco, Escobal and Marlin (Guatemala), San Martín and ASP & ASP2 (Honduras), La Libertad (Nicaragua) and Corazón de Tinieblas (Mexico). The database is hosted by the Centre for Latin American and Caribbean Studies (CLACS), formerly the Institute of Latin American Studies (ILAS), and is also available through the e-resources catalogues of the British Library and the Senate House Library.

The project is based at the Centre for Latin American and Caribbean Studies (CLACS) at the School of Advanced Study, University of London, and is carried out in partnership with researchers at Centro de Investigaciones y Estudios Superiores en Antropología Social (CIESAS), Mexico City. It is funded by the British Academy's Sustainable Development Programme, supported under the UK Government's Global Challenges Research Fund.
