= Institute of Latin American Studies =

English research institute

- Established: 1965
- Head: Linda Newson
- Owner: School of Advanced Study, University of London
- Location: London, England, United Kingdom
- Website: ilas.sas.ac.uk

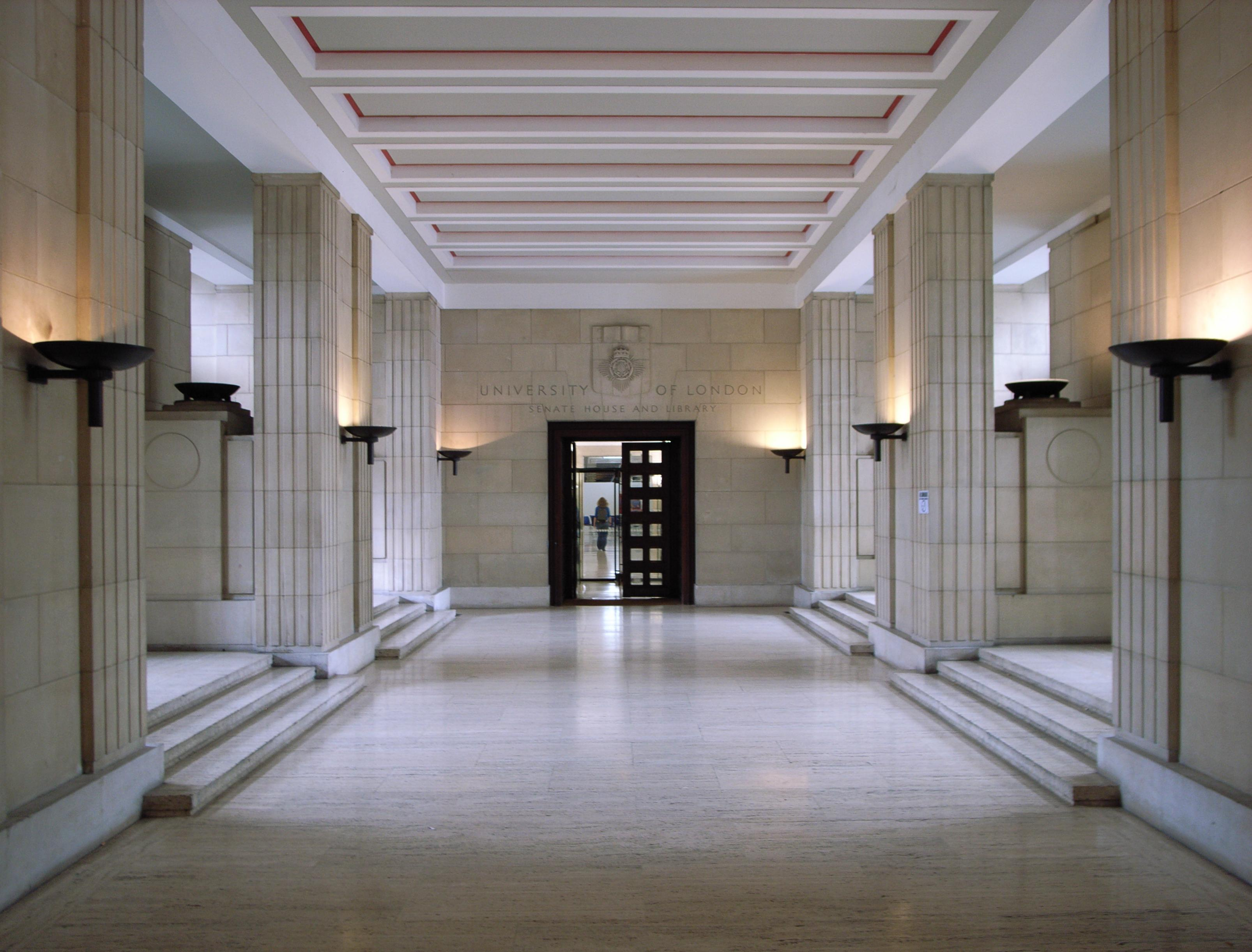
The Institute of Latin American Studies was located at 31 Tavistock Square for many years, with its Library at number 35, then later relocated to the art-deco style Senate House in London, whose entrance hall is shown above.

The Institute of Latin American Studies (ILAS) was one of nine research institutes that comprised the School of Advanced Study at the University of London. It was located at 31 Tavistock Square in Bloomsbury, central London.

Following a consultation on proposals for the future of the school in late 2020, the activity of ILAS will be continued by the Centre for Latin American and Caribbean Studies (CLACS) established from April 2021 at the Institute of Modern Languages Research (IMLR), joining its six transnational and transcultural research centres.

== History ==
The Institute of Latin American Studies was established in 1965 with the objective of providing a focus for research on the literature, arts, history, politics and economics of Latin America and the Caribbean. It has been part of the School of Advanced Study, the UK’s national research centre and the only institution to receive national funding to promote research in the humanities.

ILAS’s founding director was Robin Humphreys, the first professor of Latin American history and the founder of Latin American studies in the United Kingdom. Humphreys’ tenure at ILAS from 1965 to 1974 "set the standards which gained for the subject academic status and funding".

Between 2004 and 2013, ILAS formed part of the Institute for the Study of the Americas (ISA), along with the Institute of United States Studies (IUSS). In August 2013, ILAS was re-established to focus solely on supporting research on Latin America and the Caribbean. From April 2021, ILAS's activity will be continued by the Centre for Latin American and Caribbean Studies (CLACS).

== Mission ==
The national and international mission of ILAS has been to support researchers engaged in scholarship in the humanities broadly defined pertaining to Latin America and the Caribbean by building and maintaining national scholarly networks; hosting visiting fellows; hosting and promoting academic events; and providing digital resources of use for the research community.

The Institute’s area studies focus has been multidisciplinary and, as part of the School of Advanced Study, has benefited from academic collaboration across a wide range of subject fields in the humanities and social sciences. Furthermore, ILAS has worked closely with cultural, diplomatic and business organizations with an interest in Latin America.

== Research projects ==
- The Juridification of Resource Conflicts
- Latin America and the Global History of Knowledge
- Commodities of Empire

== Resources ==
- Research Portal
- Library and E-Resources
- The Caribbean Studies Collection
- The Legal Cultures of the Subsoil Database

== Academics and rankings ==
ILAS has offered a variety of taught and research Master's degrees as well as a Doctorate of Philosophy (Ph.D.) in Latin American and Caribbean Studies.

Despite enjoying international recognition as an established centre of excellence for research facilitation, the institute, as a postgraduate-only institution, has not been included in most university rankings tables.

== Publishing ==
ILAS has been the editorial and administrative home of the renowned Journal of Latin American Studies. The institute's books have been published by the University of London Press, a fully open-access academic publisher based in the School of Advanced Study, of which ILAS has formed part.

== Library ==
The Institute of Latin American Studies has maintained one of the premier libraries in Europe dedicated exclusively to the study of Latin America and the Caribbean, with much of the materials sourced directly from the countries of origin.

== See also ==
- Robin Humphreys
