= Robin Humphreys =

British historian (1907–1999)

Robin Humphreys OBE
- Born: Robert Arthur Humphreys; 6 June 1907
- Died: 2 May 1999 (aged 91)
- Awards: Order of Rio Branco (1972)

Academic background
- Education: Peterhouse, Cambridge
- Doctoral advisor: Ernest Barker

Academic work
- Discipline: History
- Sub-discipline: Latin American history
- Institutions: University College, London

Robert Arthur Humphreys OBE (1907–1999), known as Robin Humphreys, was a British historian, the first professor of Latin American studies in the United Kingdom, and the founder of the Institute of Latin American Studies at University College London. His books cover the emancipation of South America, British diplomacy in Central America, and the evolution of modern Latin America.

== Life and career ==
Born on 6 June 1907, Humphreys was educated at Lincoln Grammar School and graduated from Peterhouse, Cambridge. In 1934 he was appointed assistant lecturer in American history at University College London (UCL).

During the Second World War Humphreys worked at the British Foreign Office in a research capacity.

After the war he returned to UCL and was promoted to reader, becoming, in 1948, the UK's first professor of Latin American history.

In 1965 Humphreys was the founding Director of the University of London's Institute of Latin American Studies, a position he held until 1974. From 1965 to 1969 he also served as the President of the Royal Historical Society.

He died on 2 May 1999 aged 91.

== Works ==
- British Consular Reports on the Trade and Politics of Latin America, 1824-1826 (1940)
- Latin America (1941)
- "The Study of Latin-American History in England"
- William Robertson and his History of America (1954)
- "William Hickling Prescott: The Man and the Historian" (1959)
- Tradition and Revolt in Latin America, and other essays (1969) Bloomsbury Publishing Plc
- Latin America and the Second World War (2 vols., 1981–82)
  - Volume 1: 1939 - 1942, Bloomsbury Academic, ISBN 978-1-47428-822-4
  - Volume 2: 1942 - 1945, Bloomsbury Academic, ISBN 978-1-47428-825-5

Academic offices
Preceded by Goronwy Edwards	President of the Royal Historical Society; 1965–1969	Succeeded by Richard Southern
