= Margot Finn =

British historian and academic

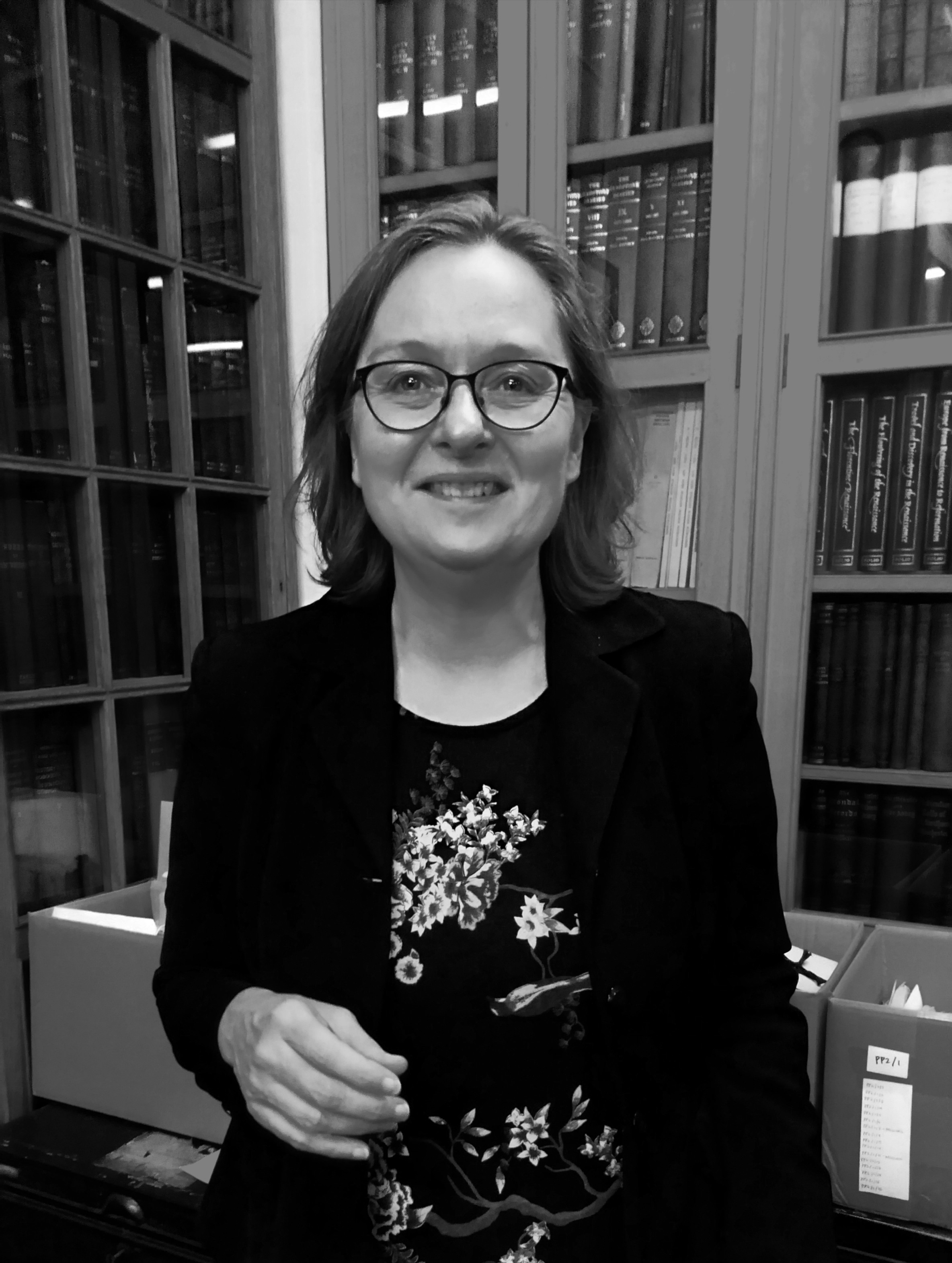
Professor Margot Finn, September 2019

Margot C. Finn FBA FRHistS (/ˈmɑːrɡoʊ ˈfɪn/) is a British historian and academic who specialises in Britain and the British colonial world during the long nineteenth century. She has been Professor of Modern British History at the University College, London (UCL) since 2012. Finn was previously the President of the Royal Historical Society and a trustee of the Victoria & Albert Museum.

Prior to joining UCL, she was professor of history and pro-vice-chancellor at the University of Warwick.

On 24 November 2017, Finn presented her first annual presidential address as president of the Royal Historical Society, discussing the subject of 'Loot' in her series on 'Material Turns in Modern British History'.

In July 2019, she was elected a Fellow of the British Academy (FBA), the United Kingdom's national academy for the humanities and social sciences.

Finn has been described as one of a group of historians who "have looked beyond male leaders, using microhistory approaches to show the significance of British women’s reproductive and diplomatic work on the sidelines".

== Selected publications ==
- (Edited with Kate Smith), The East India Company at Home, 1757-1857. (London: UCL Press, 2018) ISBN 9781013290008
- Margot Finn and Kate Smith (eds), New Paths to Public Histories (London: Palgrave Pivot, 2015). ISBN 9781137480491
- After Chartism: Class and Nation in English Radical Politics 1848-1874 (Cambridge: Cambridge University Press, 2003). ISBN 9780521404969
- The Character of Credit: Personal Debt in English Culture, 1740-1914 (Cambridge: Cambridge University Press, 2003). ISBN 9780521036498
- "Family Formations: Anglo India and the Familial Proto-State", in David Feldman and Jon Lawrence, (eds), Structures and Transformations in Modern British History: Essays for Gareth Stedman Jones (Cambridge University Press, 2011), pp. 100–17
- "'Frictions' d'empire: les réseaux de circulation des successions et des patrimonies dans la Bombay colonial des années 1780'", Annales: Histoire, Sciences Sociales, 65, 5 (2010), pp. 1175–1204
- "The Barlow Bastards: Romance Comes Home from the Empire", in Margot Finn, Michael Lobban and Jenny Bourne Taylor, (eds), Legitimacy and Illegitimacy in Nineteenth-Century Law, Literature and History, ed. (London: Palgrave/Macmillan, 2010), pp. 25–47
- "Anglo-Indian Lives in the Later Eighteenth and Early Nineteenth Century", Journal for Eighteenth-Century Studies, 33, 1 (March 2010), pp. 49–65
- "Slaves out of Context: Domestic Slavery and the Anglo-Indian Family, c. 1780-1820", Transactions of the Royal Historical Society, 6th series, 19 (2009), pp. 181–203
- "Scenes of Literary Life: The Homes of England", in James Chandler, (ed.,) The New Cambridge History of English Literature: The Romantic Period (Cambridge University Press, 2009), pp. 293–313
- "Colonial Gifts: Family Politics and the Exchange of Goods in British India, c. 1780-1820", Modern Asian Studies, 40, 1 (2006), pp. 203–32
