= Eighteenth-Century Studies =

- Discipline: Interdisciplinary
- Language: English
- Edited by: Ramesh Mallipeddi

Publication details
- History: 1966-present
- Publisher: Johns Hopkins University Press (United States)
- Frequency: Quarterly

Standard abbreviations
- ISO 4: Eighteenth-Century Stud.

Indexing
- ISSN: 0013-2586 (print); 1086-315X (web)
- JSTOR: 00132586
- OCLC no.: 33890369

Links
- Journal homepage; Online access

Eighteenth-Century Studies is an academic journal established in 1966 and the official publication of the American Society for Eighteenth-Century Studies. It focuses on all aspects of 18th century history. It is related to the annual Studies in Eighteenth-Century Culture. The current editor-in-chief is Ramesh Mallipeddi (University of British Columbia). The journal is published quarterly in October, January, April, and July by the Johns Hopkins University Press.
