= Royal Historical Society =

Historical society in London, England

- Abbreviation: RHistS, RHS
- Formation: 1868; 158 years ago
- Merger of: Camden Society (1897) with the RHS
- Registration no.: 206888
- Legal status: Charity
- Purpose: Historical studies
- Headquarters: University College London, Gower Street, WC1E 6BT
- Location: London
- Members: 6,500 members (2026)
- President: Lucy Noakes
- Director: Philip Carter
- Board of directors: Trustees: Professor Lucy Noakes, Dr Stella Ruth Fletcher, Professor Catriona Louise Pennell, Dr David John Hitchcock, Dr Catherine Clare Feely, Professor Karen Louise Harvey, Dr Jesus Sanjurjo-Ramos, Professor Matthias Neumann, Professor Clare Victoria Joanne Griffiths, Dr Adam Budd, Professor Iftikhar Haider Malik, Professor Mark James Knights, Dr Helen Julia Paul, Professor Olwen Ruth Purdue, Dr Katharine Marie Bradley, Dr Emilie Murphy, Professor Barbara Bombi
- Main organ: Transactions
- Staff: 5 (2026)
- Website: royalhistsoc.org
- Formerly called: The Historical Society

The Royal Historical Society (RHS), founded in 1868, is a learned society of the United Kingdom which advances scholarly studies of history.

== Origins ==
The society was founded and received its royal charter in 1868. Until 1872 it was known as the Historical Society. In 1897, it merged with (or absorbed) the Camden Society, founded in 1838. In its origins, and for many years afterwards, the society was effectively a gentlemen's club. In the middle and later twentieth century the RHS took on a more active role in representing the discipline and profession of history.

== Current activities ==
The society exists to promote historical research in the United Kingdom and worldwide, representing historians of all kinds. Its activities primarily concern advocacy and policy research, training, publishing, grants and research support, especially for early career historians, and awards and professional recognition. It provides a varied programme of lectures and one-day and two-day conferences and symposia covering diverse historical topics. It convenes in London and from time to time elsewhere throughout the United Kingdom. Since 1967 it has been based at University College London.

== Governance ==
The society is governed by a board of trustees called the council, which is chaired by the RHS President. The president and members of council are elected from the society's fellows. There are 22 councillors, each of whom serves a four-year term. Every year the fellowship elects three new members of council using a preferential voting system. Council members come from a wide variety of backgrounds and research interests.

== Fellows and members ==
The society's membership comprises honorary vice-presidents (management), elected fellows (entitled to use FRHistS as post-nominal letters), associate fellows, and members.

Fellowships are awarded to those who have made an original contribution to historical scholarship, typically through the authorship of a book, a body of scholarly work similar in scale and impact to a book, the organisation of exhibitions and conferences, the editing of journals, and other works of diffusion and dissemination grounded in historical research. Election is conducted by review and applications must be supported by someone who is already a fellow. A list of current fellows and members is maintained online by the RHS.

== Publications ==
The society's publications include its monographic series Studies in History (1975–2020) and New Historical Perspectives (2016–), its annual Transactions (first published as Transactions of the Historical Society, 1872), and the Camden Series of editions and translations of texts; as well as digital publications, such as the Bibliography of British and Irish History.

The society runs an active open-access online blog, entitled Historical Transactions. It was established in 2018 as part of the commemoration of the Royal Historical Society's 150th Anniversary.

== Prizes ==
The regular prizes, awards and recognitions granted by the society include:

- Gladstone Book Prize
- Whitfield Book Prize

Only two historians have been awarded both the Whitfield Prize and the Alexander Prize:

- A. G. Rosser – Alexander Prize (1983), Whitfield Prize (1989)
- Ryan Hanley – Alexander Prize (2015), Whitfield Prize (2019)

== List of presidents ==
The presidents of the society have been:

- 1871–1872: George Grote
- 1873–1878: John Russell, 1st Earl Russell
- 1878–1891: Henry Bruce, 1st Baron Aberdare
- 1891–1899: Sir Mountstuart Duff
- 1899–1901: Sir Adolphus Ward
- 1901–1905: Sir George Prothero
- 1905–1909: William Hunt
- 1909–1913: William Cunningham
- 1913–1917: Sir Charles Firth
- 1917–1921: Sir Charles Oman
- 1921–1925: Sir John Fortescue
- 1925–1929: Thomas Tout
- 1929–1933: Sir Richard Lodge
- 1933–1937: Sir Frederick Powicke
- 1937–1945: Sir Frank Stenton
- 1946–1949: Robert Seton-Watson
- 1949–1953: Theodore Plucknett
- 1953–1957: Hugh Hale Bellot
- 1957–1961: David Knowles
- 1961–1965: Sir Goronwy Edwards
- 1965–1969: Robin Humphreys
- 1969–1973: Sir Richard Southern
- 1973–1977: Sir Geoffrey Elton
- 1977–1981: Sir John Habakkuk
- 1981–1985: Sir James Holt
- 1985–1989: Gerald Aylmer
- 1989–1993: Francis Thompson
- 1993–1997: Sir Rees Davies
- 1997–2001: Peter James Marshall
- 2001–2005: Dame Jinty Nelson
- 2005–2008: Martin Daunton
- 2009–2012: Colin Jones
- 2012–2016: Peter Mandler
- 2016–2020: Margot Finn
- 2020–2024: Emma Griffin
- 2024–: Lucy Noakes

== Bibliography ==
- Crawley, Charles William (1970). "Sir George Prothero and his Circle". Transactions of the Royal Historical Society. 20: 101–127. doi:10.2307/3678764. JSTOR 3678764. S2CID 251234098.
- Humphreys, Robert Arthur (1969). The Royal Historical Society 1868–1968. London: Royal Historical Society. ISBN 9780901050007.
- Milne, Alexander Taylor (1968). A Centenary Guide to the Publications of the Royal Historical Society 1868–1968, and of the former Camden Society 1838–1897. Royal Historical Society Guides and Handbooks. London: Royal Historical Society. ISBN 9780901050007.
- A Handbook of Dates: For Students of British History, Royal Historical Society Guides and Handbooks (Cambridge University Press, 2000) ISBN 9780521778459

== See also ==
- The Historical Association
- List of British professional bodies
- List of Royal Societies
- Historiography of the United Kingdom
