= Dobb–Sweezy debate =

Marxist debate on the transition to capitalism

The Dobb–Sweezy debate, also known as the transition debate, was a major debate among Marxist historians and economists during the 1950s concerning the nature of the transition from feudalism to capitalism. It originated with the publication of Maurice Dobb's book Studies in the Development of Capitalism in 1946 and a subsequent critique by Paul Sweezy in the journal Science & Society in 1950. The discussion, which eventually involved numerous other scholars, was a foundational exchange in 20th-century Marxist historiography and remains a central reference point in discussions of historical transitions.

The core of the debate centred on the "prime mover" of feudalism's decline. Dobb, building on Karl Marx's analysis of "the so-called primitive accumulation" in Capital, argued that the dissolution of the feudal mode of production was the result of internal contradictions within the system. He located the primary cause in the class struggle between lords and peasants driven by the lords' increasing need for revenue. Sweezy contended that feudalism was an inherently conservative and stable system of "production for use" that was undermined by an external force: the growth of long-distance trade and commodity exchange, which created a dynamic "exchange economy" that acted as a solvent on feudal relations.

The debate expanded to include contributions from scholars such as Kohachiro Takahashi, Rodney Hilton, Christopher Hill, and Eric Hobsbawm. Key themes included the precise definition of feudalism, the role of towns and trade within the feudal system, and the nature of the transitional period between the decline of feudalism and the rise of capitalism, including the character of the absolutist state. The debate was later reinvigorated during the New Left ferment of the 1960s and 1970s, culminating in Robert Brenner's work, which critiqued the assumptions of both Dobb and Sweezy and offered a new explanation for the origins of capitalism based on specific social property relations.

== Background ==
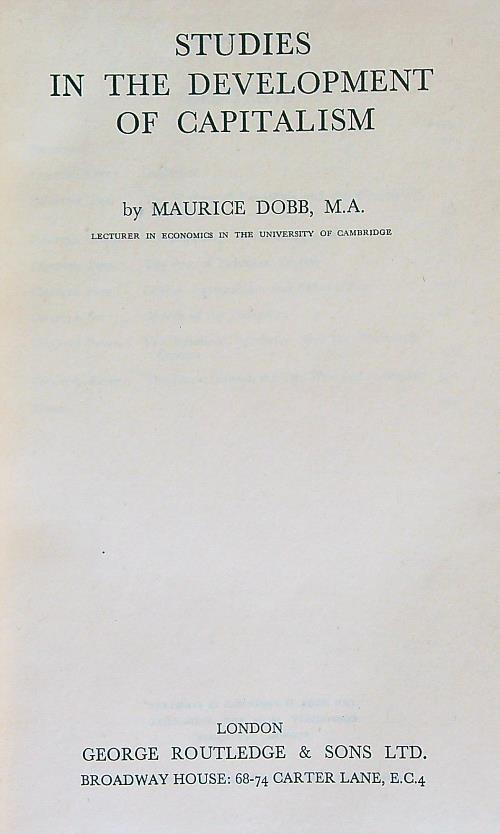
Title page of Studies in the Development of Capitalism (1946)

The debate was initiated by the publication of British economist Maurice Dobb's Studies in the Development of Capitalism in 1946. In the book, Dobb presented a history of capitalism's emergence, beginning with the decline of feudalism in Western Europe. Dobb defined feudalism as a mode of production "virtually idential with what we usually mean by serfdom: an obligation laid on the producer by force and independently of his own volition to fulfil certain economic demands of an overlord".

He argued that the decline of this system was not caused by an external shock, but by internal contradictions generated by the exploitation of the peasantry. For Dobb, the primary cause of feudalism's demise was the ruling class's relentless pressure on the producers for more surplus labour. He wrote that "it was the inefficiency of Feudalism as a system of production, coupled with the growing needs of the ruling class for revenue, that was primarily responsible for its decline". This over-exploitation led not to a rising standard of living for the lords, but to an exhaustion of the labour force, peasant flight from the land, and ultimately a "crisis of feudalism" in the 14th century, which undermined the traditional social relations. While towns played a role in providing refuge for runaway serfs, Dobb maintained that the main arena of struggle was the confrontation between peasants and landlords in the countryside. For Dobb, the decline of feudalism and the rise of capitalism were separated by at least two centuries; he dated the beginning of the capitalist mode of production to the latter half of the 16th century.

In formulating his argument, Dobb was building on a specific strand of Karl Marx's work. While Marx's earlier writings, such as The Communist Manifesto, presented a narrative in which capitalism develops in the towns and "bursts asunder" the fetters of feudalism, his later economic works, particularly Capital, offered a different account. In his critique of "the so-called primitive accumulation", Marx argued that the historical precondition for capitalism was not simply the accumulation of wealth but a transformation of social property relations, specifically the expropriation of direct producers from the land in the English countryside. It was this latter framework that Dobb and later participants in the debate developed.

== Initial exchange ==
=== Sweezy's critique ===
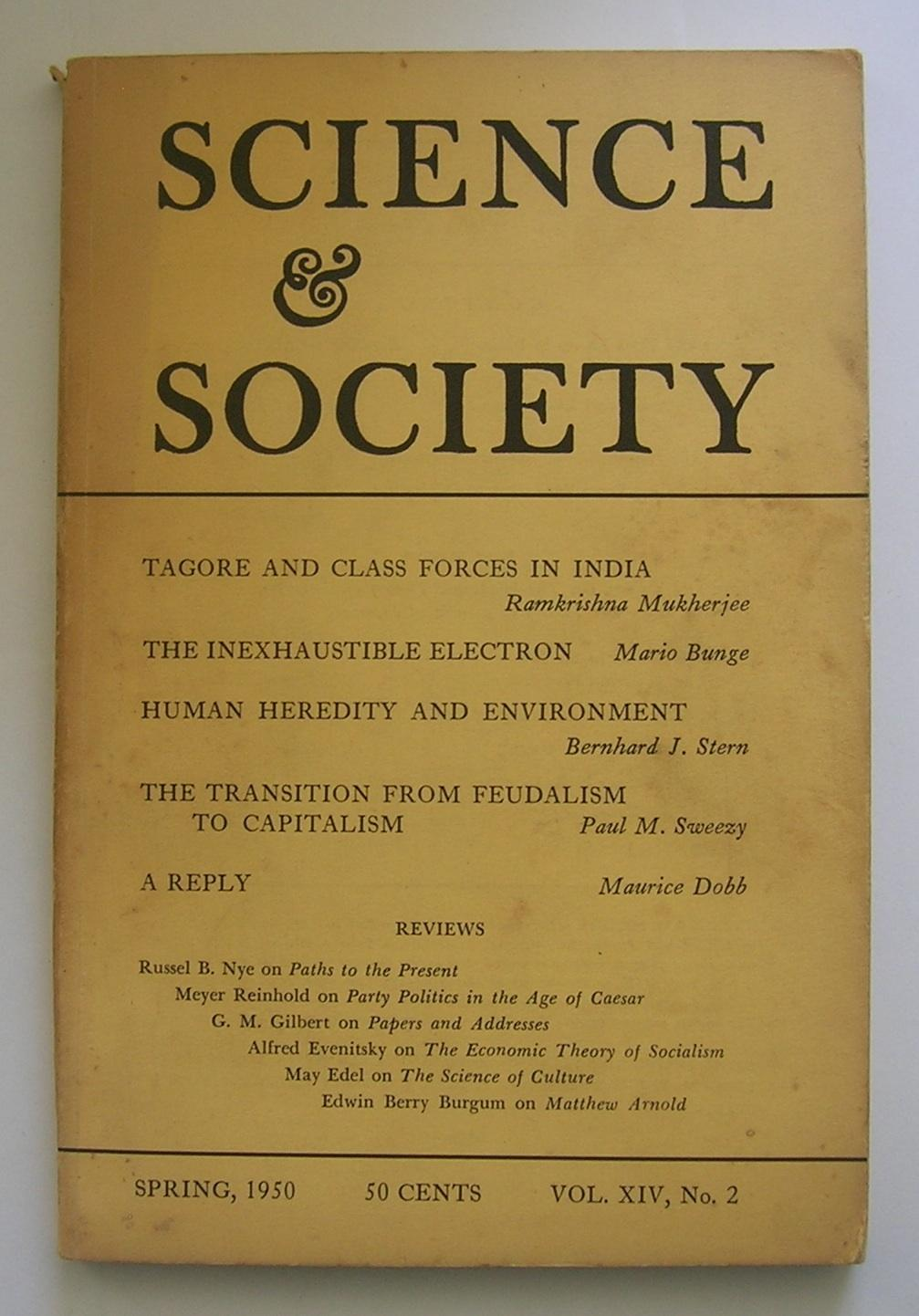
Cover of Science & Society Volume XIV, No. 2 (Spring 1950), containing both Sweeezy's initial critique and Dobb's reply

In 1950, American economist Paul Sweezy published a critique of Dobb's Studies in the journal Science & Society, initiating the debate. Sweezy challenged Dobb's definition of feudalism, arguing that serfdom could exist in non-feudal systems and that Dobb's definition was too broad. Instead, Sweezy defined Western European feudalism as "an economic system in which serfdom is the predominant relation of production, and in which production is organized in and around the manorial estate of the lord". He characterised it as a conservative system of "production for use", with an inherent bias towards maintaining existing methods and relations of production.

Because he saw the feudal system as inherently stable, Sweezy argued that the "prime mover" of its decline must have been an external force. This force, he contended, was the growth of trade, particularly long-distance trade, which "brought into existence a system of production for exchange alongside the old feudal system of production for use". This new "exchange economy" had several effects:

1. It revealed the inefficiency of the manorial economy and generated pressure for estates to buy manufactured goods rather than produce them.
2. It transformed the tastes of the feudal ruling class, creating a demand for new luxury goods that could only be acquired through trade, thus intensifying their need for cash revenue.
3. The rise of towns, which were the "centres and breeders of exchange economy", offered serfs a place to escape, a better standard of living, and improved social status, leading to the "flight from the land" that Dobb had identified as a key factor in feudalism's crisis.

Sweezy also took issue with Dobb's characterisation of the period between the 14th and late 16th centuries. Since feudalism was in decay and capitalism had not yet emerged, Sweezy proposed that this was a distinct transitional phase, which he termed "pre-capitalist commodity production". He argued it was governed by its own dynamics, distinct from both feudalism and capitalism, and that highly developed centres of commodity production, such as those in Flanders or medieval Italy, did not necessarily lead to capitalism.

=== Dobb's reply ===
Dobb responded to Sweezy in the same issue of Science & Society. He defended his definition of feudalism as a system of social relations based on the coercive extraction of surplus labour, arguing that this was the "crucial characteristic" that different forms of serfdom shared. He criticised Sweezy's focus on "production for use" versus "production for the market" as a superficial distinction that privileged relations of exchange over relations of production.

Dobb rejected Sweezy's assertion that the feudal system was inherently stable, arguing that this would "make it an exception to the general Marxist law of development that economic society is moved by its own internal contradictions". He maintained that the primary dynamic of feudalism was the class conflict between peasants and lords. He did not deny the importance of trade, but saw it as a factor that "accentuated the internal conflicts within the old mode of production" rather than acting as a purely external dissolvent.

To counter Sweezy's trade-based argument, Dobb cited the "second serfdom" in Eastern Europe, where the growth of trade and proximity to markets in the 15th and 16th centuries led to an intensification of feudal obligations, not their dissolution. This demonstrated, in Dobb's view, that the effect of trade was determined by the internal character and balance of class forces within the feudal system itself. Finally, Dobb rejected Sweezy's concept of a "pre-capitalist commodity production" phase. He argued that despite the decline of serfdom, the ruling class of the period remained feudal, deriving its income from surviving feudal methods of exploitation. The state, therefore, was still a feudal state, making the overall mode of production feudal, even if it was "a feudal economy at an advanced stage of dissolution".

== Widening of the debate ==
The initial exchange between Dobb and Sweezy prompted responses from a number of other scholars, which were published in subsequent years. The contributions were collected and published in 1976 by Rodney Hilton.

=== Kohachiro Takahashi ===
In 1952, Japanese historian Kohachiro Takahashi entered the debate with an essay that criticised both Dobb and Sweezy. Takahashi argued that the central problem in defining a mode of production is the "social existence-form of labour power". Feudalism's defining characteristic, he stated, was serfdom, while capitalism's was wage labour. He faulted Sweezy for divorcing feudalism from serfdom and focusing on the relationship between production and the market, a position he described as "circulationism".

Takahashi also criticised Dobb's formulation as too narrow, arguing that it needed a more systematic logical structure based on an analysis of the virgate (Hufe), the village community (Gemeinde), and the manor (Grundherrschaft). While he agreed with Dobb that the contradictions of feudalism were internal, he found Dobb's account of these contradictions insufficient. Takahashi supported Dobb's point regarding the "second serfdom", arguing that the specific internal structure of a region's feudal system determined whether the growth of trade led to its dissolution (as in Western Europe) or its intensification (as in the East). Takahashi also insisted that the debate be widened beyond the English case to include continental Europe, and held out the prospect that such a wider debate might illuminate the transition question in Asia.

A major contribution of Takahashi's was his introduction of Marx's distinction, from Volume III of Capital, between "two ways" for the emergence of capitalism:

1. Way I: "the really revolutionary way", where a section of the producers themselves accumulate capital and become capitalists.
2. Way II: where a section of the existing merchant class "takes possession directly of production", preserving the old mode of production but subordinating it to merchant capital.

Takahashi argued that this distinction was crucial for understanding the different paths of capitalist development in different countries, contrasting the "revolutionary" path of England and France with the more conservative path of Prussia and Japan.

=== Rodney Hilton and Christopher Hill ===
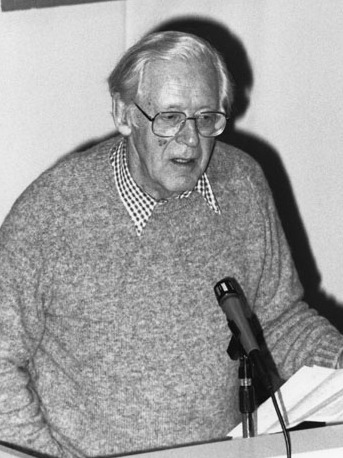
Rodney Hilton

In 1953, two British historians, Rodney Hilton and Christopher Hill, published comments on the debate. Hilton, a medievalist, agreed with Dobb's emphasis on internal factors. He criticised Sweezy's reliance on the theories of Henri Pirenne concerning the role of long-distance trade, arguing that Pirenne's thesis had been substantially challenged by later research showing that the decline of the Roman Empire was the result of internal factors that pre-dated the closure of the Mediterranean to trade. For Hilton, the prime mover of feudal society was the struggle over rent—the appropriation of the peasants' surplus product by the landowners. "The maintenance of class power in existing hands, and its extension if possible, is the driving force in feudal economy and feudal politics. For this reason rent had to be maximised". This struggle, he argued, drove the development of productive forces and the political and institutional changes within feudalism.

Christopher Hill focused on the character of the state in the transitional period. He challenged Sweezy's suggestion that in 15th- and 16th-century England there was "not one ruling class but several", which were balanced by an independent state. Hill argued that the concept of "several ruling classes" was a "logical absurdity" and that the absolutist monarchy of the Tudor and Stuart periods was fundamentally a feudal state. It was an executive institution of the feudal landowning class, designed to repress peasant revolt and control the movements of the labour force after the crisis of the 14th century had weakened the old manorial system of control.

== Themes of the debate ==
=== The "prime mover" of feudal decline ===
The central question of the debate was the engine of change that drove the dissolution of the feudal mode of production.

- The internal-causation thesis (Dobb, Hilton, Takahashi): This position holds that the decline of feudalism was a result of contradictions within the system itself. For Dobb, the cause was the feudal ruling class's inefficient and short-sighted exploitation of the peasantry to meet its growing need for revenue, which led to class struggle and peasant flight. Hilton developed this by identifying the struggle over the appropriation of rent as the "prime mover" that drove both economic development and class conflict.
- The external-causation thesis (Sweezy): This position holds that feudalism was an inherently conservative system of production for use, which lacked any internal dynamic for change. Sweezy argued that the system was dissolved by the growth of trade and an "exchange economy" that was external to it. This external force destabilized feudal relations by introducing new market pressures, changing the consumption patterns of the ruling class, and providing an escape for the servile population.

=== The role of towns and trade ===
Closely related to the "prime mover" question was the role assigned to towns and commerce. Sweezy, following Pirenne, saw towns as external to the feudal system—as enclaves of "exchange economy" that acted as a solvent on the rural "use economy". Dobb, Hilton, and Takahashi argued against this dualism. They contended that towns and trade were not external but developed within the feudal mode of production. The character and impact of commerce were therefore determined by the existing feudal social relations. As Dobb argued, the growth of a money economy did not automatically lead to the end of serfdom; in some regions, such as Eastern Europe, it led to its reinforcement to supply a growing grain market. In a later essay, John Merrington further developed this critique, arguing that "feudalism was the first mode of production in history to allow ... an autonomous structural place to urban production and merchant capital" and that towns often functioned as "collective seigneurs" with their own forms of monopoly and exploitation over the countryside.

=== The transitional period ===
The debate also addressed how to characterise the period between the evident decline of feudalism (c. 1350) and the rise of capitalism (c. 1600).

- Sweezy proposed that this was a distinct mode of production, which he termed "pre-capitalist commodity production". He argued it was neither feudal (since serfdom had largely disappeared) nor capitalist (since wage-labour was not yet dominant). He later queried whether this period might have been characterised by several ruling classes balancing each other, allowing the state to acquire a degree of independence, a view Hill strongly opposed.
- Dobb, Hill, and Takahashi argued that the period remained fundamentally feudal. Although serfdom in the form of direct labour services had waned, the economic relationships in the countryside were still governed by "political constraint and the pressures of manorial custom". The ruling class remained the landed aristocracy, and the absolutist state was its political instrument. Capitalism therefore developed from within a still-dominant feudal structure, rather than emerging after feudalism had already collapsed.

== Legacy and later contributions ==
The Dobb–Sweezy debate was a defining moment for 20th-century Marxist historiography. It moved the discussion of historical transitions away from rigid, schematic models towards a more dynamic analysis of internal contradictions and class struggle.

The essays collected in the 1976 volume The Transition from Feudalism to Capitalism showed the evolution of the debate's themes. Eric Hobsbawm's contribution questioned the universality of the Western European transition. He noted that "the transition from feudalism is, on a world scale, a case of highly uneven development" and that in most of the world, contact with rising European capitalism did not lead to parallel development but to subjugation and the intensification of pre-capitalist structures. Hobsbawm also stressed that the transition was a long, complex process involving several distinct economic phases and crises, such as the "crisis of the 17th century", not a single, linear event.

Another influential contribution was from Perry Anderson. In Lineages of the Absolutist State (1974), Anderson offered a dialectical view of the early modern state. He argued that the absolutist monarchies were not a transitional state balancing the interests of the feudal aristocracy and the rising bourgeoisie, but rather a "redeployed and recharged apparatus of feudal domination". The disappearance of serfdom threatened noble power, which was "displaced upwards" and centralized into the absolutist state, which became the new instrument for maintaining noble control over the peasantry. At the same time, Anderson acknowledged that this state also created an essential space for the development of capitalism, as political and economic control began to be separated, allowing capitalist forces to emerge within a political order that remained feudal.

Later commentators argued that both sides of the original debate shared an unexamined assumption. Political scientist Ellen Meiksins Wood argued that both Dobb and Sweezy treated capitalism as a quantitative extension of pre-existing commercial practices, a system that would naturally arise once external or internal barriers were removed. For Sweezy, the motor was expanding trade, while for Dobb and Hilton, it was the liberation of "petty commodity production" from feudal constraints. In Wood's view, both positions assumed a pre-existing capitalist logic that only needed to be "shaken loose", without explaining how this new logic of competition and accumulation came into being in the first place.

=== The Brenner debate ===
In the 1970s, historian Robert Brenner initiated a new phase of the discussion, often known as the Brenner debate. Brenner challenged what he called the "commercialization model" of capitalist origins, a view he argued was shared not only by older non-Marxist historians but also by Marxists like Sweezy, whom he labelled "neo-Smithian". Brenner was also critical of the demographic models then prevalent in mainstream historiography. However, he also critiqued the Dobb-Hilton thesis, arguing that their model of rising petty commodity production did not explain the crucial shift from simply producing for the market to being dependent on the market and subject to its competitive imperatives.

Like Dobb and Hilton, Brenner located the origins of capitalism in the countryside, but he argued that capitalism emerged not through the liberation of commodity production but through a specific transformation of social property relations in England. Following the crisis of feudalism, class struggle in England resulted in an unusual outcome: peasants were largely freed from serfdom but failed to establish firm freehold control over the land. This created a unique situation where a large class of tenant farmers became dependent on the market to secure their leases and means of subsistence. This market dependence, according to Brenner, was the crucial factor that created the distinctively capitalist imperatives of competition, profit-maximisation, and the constant need to improve labour productivity. In France, by contrast, the peasantry succeeded in securing control over the land, which led to the persistence of small-scale peasant production and the development of the absolutist state as a centralized form of surplus-extraction, a path that did not lead to capitalism. Brenner's intervention thus shifted the focus of the debate away from the growth of trade or the liberation of producers towards the specific social and political conditions that created a new system of market imperatives.

Brenner's thesis has been criticised by scholars such as Guy Bois, Chris Harman, and Terence J. Byres. They argued that Brenner's emphasis on class relations was overly schematic and voluntaristic, and neglected the role of the development of the productive forces. Byres, drawing on Hilton's research, argued that Brenner minimised the significance of social differentiation within the peasantry. It was not landlords, Byres contended, but an emerging class of rich, market-oriented peasants who took the lead in the transition by acquiring more land, employing wage labour, and seeking opportunities in the market once the constraints of feudalism had been weakened by class struggle.

== Works cited ==
- Hilton, Rodney, ed. (1978). The Transition from Feudalism to Capitalism. Verso. ISBN 9780860917014.
  - Bibliographical Note (1978). "Bibliographical Note". In Hilton, Rodney (ed.). The Transition from Feudalism to Capitalism. Verso. p. 6. ISBN 9780860917014.
  - Dobb, Maurice (1978a). "A Reply". In Hilton, Rodney (ed.). The Transition from Feudalism to Capitalism. Verso. pp. 57–67. ISBN 9780860917014.
  - Dobb, Maurice (1978b). "A Further Comment". In Hilton, Rodney (ed.). The Transition from Feudalism to Capitalism. Verso. pp. 98–101. ISBN 9780860917014.
  - Hill, Christopher (1978). "A Comment". In Hilton, Rodney (ed.). The Transition from Feudalism to Capitalism. Verso. pp. 118–121. ISBN 9780860917014.
  - Hilton, Rodney (1978a). "Introduction". In Hilton, Rodney (ed.). The Transition from Feudalism to Capitalism. Verso. pp. 9–30. ISBN 9780860917014.
  - Hilton, Rodney (1978b). "A Comment". In Hilton, Rodney (ed.). The Transition from Feudalism to Capitalism. Verso. pp. 109–117. ISBN 9780860917014.
  - Hobsbawm, Eric (1978). "From Feudalism to Capitalism". In Hilton, Rodney (ed.). The Transition from Feudalism to Capitalism. Verso. pp. 159–164. ISBN 9780860917014.
  - Merrington, John (1978). "Town and Country in the Transition to Capitalism". In Hilton, Rodney (ed.). The Transition from Feudalism to Capitalism. Verso. pp. 170–195. ISBN 9780860917014.
  - Sweezy, Paul (1978). "A Critique / A Rejoinder". In Hilton, Rodney (ed.). The Transition from Feudalism to Capitalism. Verso. pp. 33–56, 102–108. ISBN 9780860917014.
  - Takahashi, Kohachiro (1978). "A Contribution to the Discussion". In Hilton, Rodney (ed.). The Transition from Feudalism to Capitalism. Verso. pp. 68–97. ISBN 9780860917014.
- Heller, Henry (2011). The Birth of Capitalism: A 21st Century Perspective. Pluto Press. ISBN 978-0745329604.
- Wood, Ellen Meiksins (2002). The Origin of Capitalism: A Longer View. Verso. ISBN 978-1-85984-392-5.
