= Jhooth Bole Kauwa Kaate =

- Poster
- Directed by: Hrishikesh Mukherjee
- Screenplay by: Hrishikesh Mukherjee; Sachin Bhowmick; Z. D. Lari (dialogue)
- Story by: Bimal Kar
- Produced by: G. P. Sippy
- Starring: Anil Kapoor; Juhi Chawla; Amrish Puri; Reema Lagoo; Anupam Kher
- Cinematography: Jal Mistry
- Edited by: Subhash Gupta
- Music by: Anand–Milind
- Production companies: Polygram; Tri Star International
- Distributed by: Sippy Films
- Release date: 4 December 1998
- Running time: 143 mins
- Country: India
- Language: Hindi
- Budget: est. ₹4 crore
- Box office: est. ₹7.29 crore

Jhooth Bole Kauwa Kaate (transl. If you lie, a crow will bite you) is a 1998 Indian Hindi-language comedy film directed by Hrishikesh Mukherjee. The film stars Anil Kapoor, Juhi Chawla, Amrish Puri, Reema Lagoo, Anupam Kher and Sajid Khan. The film was the last film of Hrishikesh Mukherjee as a director.

== Synopsis ==
Shankar, an actor of sorts, loves Urmila, but since Urmila is the daughter of a conservative and orthodox retired police officer Abhayankar, it'll take a lot for Shankar to win over the Abhayankar family. Shankar then begins to create a series of lies (hence the title, when he lies, the crow bites) in attempting to get the one he loves.

== Cast ==
- Anil Kapoor as Ramanuj/Shankar
- Juhi Chawla as Urmila Abhayankar
- Amrish Puri as Mr Abhayankar
- Reema Lagoo as Mrs Abhayankar
- Anupam Kher as Rashid Khan
- Sajid Khan as Chunky
- Harpal Singh Thakur as Shanker
- Anang Desai as Mr. Sharma

== Production ==
The film was shot in Chandigarh, Manali and Lonavala.

== Music ==
The music was composed by Anand–Milind with lyrics by Anand Bakshi. Playback singers who rendered their voices are Udit Narayan (for Anil Kapoor), Abhijeet (for Sajid Khan), Vinod Rathod (for Anupam Kher), Shaiamak Davar (for himself), Parvez and Alka Yagnik (for Juhi Chawla). The soundtrack consists of 7 original songs.

No.	Song	Singer(s)
1.	"Kya Rakhun Tera Naam"	Udit Narayan
2.	"Aankhon Mein Akeli Raaton Mein"	Udit Narayan; Alka Yagnik
3.	"Badi Mushkil Hain"	Vinod Rathod; Udit Narayan; Alka Yagnik; Abhijeet
4.	"Dil Yeh Dil"	Udit Narayan; Alka Yagnik
5.	"Mama I Love You"	Alka Yagnik; Vinod Rathod
6.	"Dear O Dear"	Abhijeet
7.	"Jhoot Bole Kauwa Kaate"	Shiamak Davar; Parvez

== Reception ==
Nandita Chowdhury of India Today wrote, "Jhoot Bole Kauva Kaate has an old world charm but technically and artistically, the film is stuck in the '70s. The dialogues are stilted and Jal Mistry's cinematography often resembles that of a television sitcom." Sharmila Talliculan of Rediff.com wrote, ″The pace is fluent, befitting Hrishida's awesome reputation as one of the movie industry's finest editors. Even at the end, when the mood gets serious, the film does not jar. I found the climax very engrossing and laughed through the rest of the flick. There is always a comedy of errors in Hrishida's comedies, and the dénouement arrives after much confusion. Jhoot Bole... maintains this tradition.″
