= Political Marxism =

Strand of Marxist theory

Political Marxism (PM) is a strand of Marxist theory that places history at the centre of its analysis. It is also referred to as a form of neo-Marxism or Western Marxism.

== History ==
The term political Marxism itself was coined during the Brenner debate of the late 1970s as a criticism of the work of Brenner by the French Marxist historian Guy Bois. Bois distinguished Brenner's "political Marxism" from "economic Marxism". As such, the label political Marxism has not always been accepted by the scholars to whom it has been applied. The term is also distinguished from Marxism in the politically activist sense. According to Arnold Hauser, in this system of analysis, one can agree with Marxism as a philosophy of history and society without being a Marxist.

Political Marxism was developed as a reaction against historical models of Marxist analysis in the debate on the origins of capitalism. The political Marxist critique brought social agency and class conflict to the centre of Marxism. In this context, Robert Brenner and Ellen Wood developed political Marxism as a distinct approach to rehistoricize and repoliticize the Marxist project. It was a movement away from structuralist and timeless accounts towards historical specificity as contested process and lived praxis. This research programme has since expanded across the social sciences to include the fields of history, political theory, political economy, sociology, international relations, and international political economy.

Researchers linked with political Marxism today include Benno Teschke, Hannes Lacher, and George Comninel.
