= Manali =

Manali may refer to:

== Places in India ==
- Manali, Himachal Pradesh
- Manali, Chennai
- Manali Pudhunagar or Manali New Town, Chennai, Tamil Nadu
- Manali, Gummidipoondi, Tamil Nadu
- Manali River, in Kerala

== People ==
- Manali Desai (fl. from 2007), sociologist in England
- Manali Dey (fl. from 2007), Indian television actress
- Manali Dakshini (1997), Maharashtrian cricketer
- Manali Jagtap (1978), Indian designer and political artist
- Manali Lukha (born 1975), British weather forecaster
