= Primitive accumulation =

Marxist theory of the origin of capitalism

In Marxist theory, primitive accumulation is the process by which precapitalist modes of production, such as feudalism and subsistence agriculture, are transformed into the capitalist mode of production. The concept was first articulated in its modern form by Karl Marx in chapter 26 of the first volume of Das Kapital. Marx described primitive accumulation as the historical process of divorcing the producer from the means of production. For Marx, this was not a peaceful transition but a violent, brutal, and coercive expropriation of the direct producers—the peasantry and artisans—from their means of livelihood. At its core, the process was a transformation in social property relations that established the preconditions for capitalism, particularly in the English countryside and later globally through colonialism and national competition.

Marx's theory was a critique of the origin stories presented by classical political economists like Adam Smith, who depicted the rise of capitalism as a result of the peaceful, thrifty saving and reinvestment by an industrious minority. Marx compared this narrative to the theological concept of original sin, arguing that it served to justify the wealth of the rich and the poverty of the working class by locating its origins in a mythical past. In contrast, Marx's "so-called primitive accumulation" laid bare the violent conquests, enslavement, robbery, and murder that established the capitalist order. According to economist Michael Perelman, classical political economists were not merely passive observers of this process but active advocates who championed policies to accelerate it. Despite their public-facing rhetoric of laissez-faire, figures from William Petty to Smith actively supported measures to deprive people of their traditional means of self-provisioning in order to create a disciplined, wage-dependent workforce.

Feminist scholars, such as Silvia Federici, have expanded on Marx's analysis, arguing that primitive accumulation was also a process of subjugating women's bodies and reproductive labor to the needs of capital accumulation, a process enforced through the terror of the witch-hunts. Contemporary geographers such as David Harvey argue that "primitive accumulation" is a misnomer, as the process is ongoing, coining the term "accumulation by dispossession" to emphasize its continuity within the capitalist system.

== Origins and definition ==
The concept of "primitive accumulation" was developed by Karl Marx as a direct refutation of what he considered the "childish" and "insipid" origin story of capitalism presented by classical political economists. These accounts, which political historian Ellen Meiksins Wood terms the "commercialization model", suggest that capitalism arose as a natural result of age-old practices of trade and commerce, once they were freed from the constraints of feudalism. In this model, the rising "bourgeoisie", a class of town-dwelling merchants and artisans, gradually accumulated enough wealth to invest in new technologies and production, leading organically to industrial capitalism.

=== Adam Smith's "previous accumulation" ===
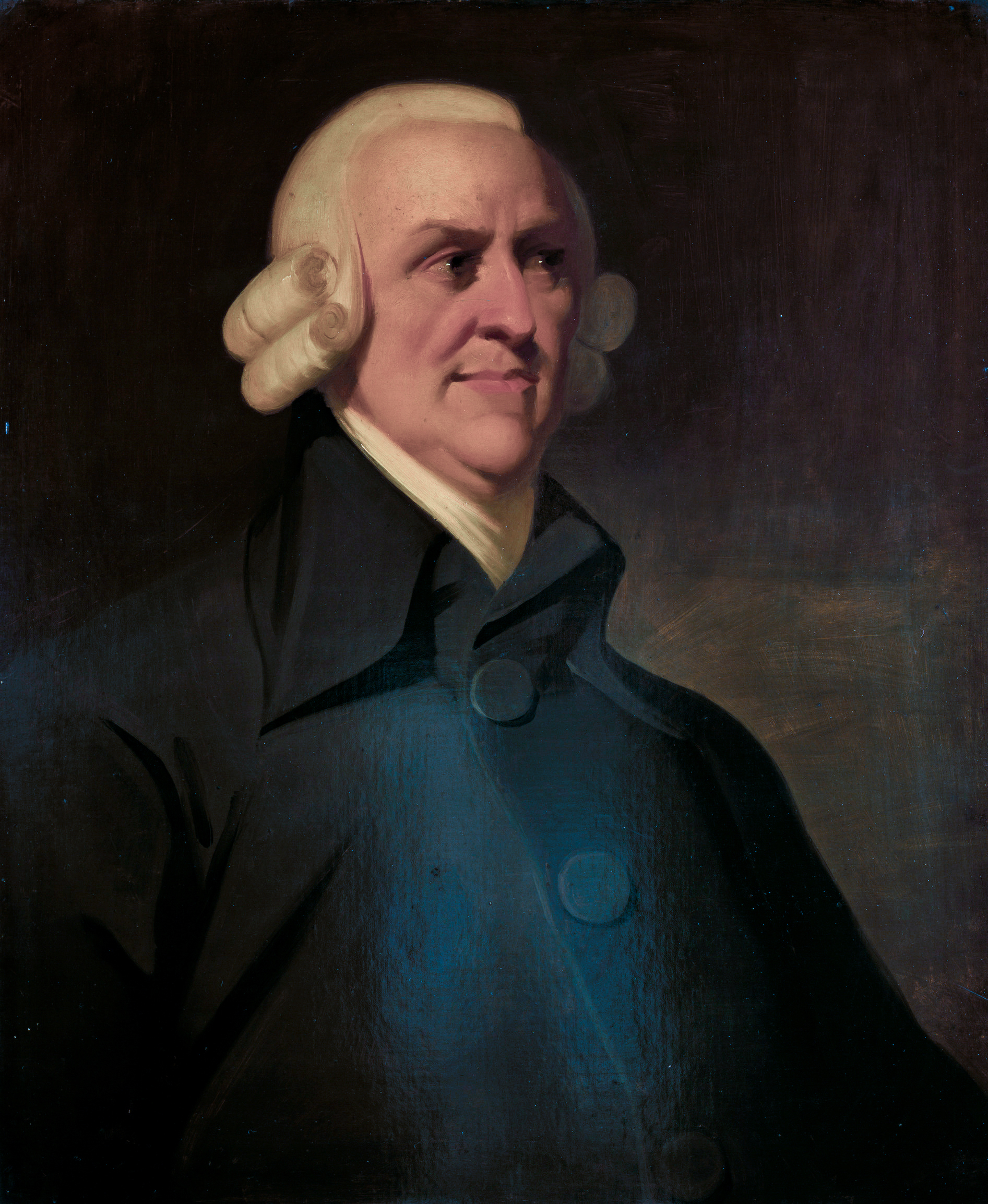
Adam Smith's cheerful optimism and laissez-faire rhetoric concealed a project to promote primitive accumulation, according to historian Michael Perelman.

In The Wealth of Nations (1776), Adam Smith argued that the accumulation of a stock of capital was a necessary precondition for the division of labour. He stated that "the accumulation of stock must, in the nature of things, be previous to the division of labour". Smith's narrative suggested that capitalism arose from a group of industrious, frugal individuals who saved and reinvested their funds, gradually building up the "stock" necessary to employ others and improve productivity. In this view, the class structure of society—between the owners of capital and the wage-labourers—emerged naturally and peacefully from the different virtues of its members.

=== Marx's critique ===
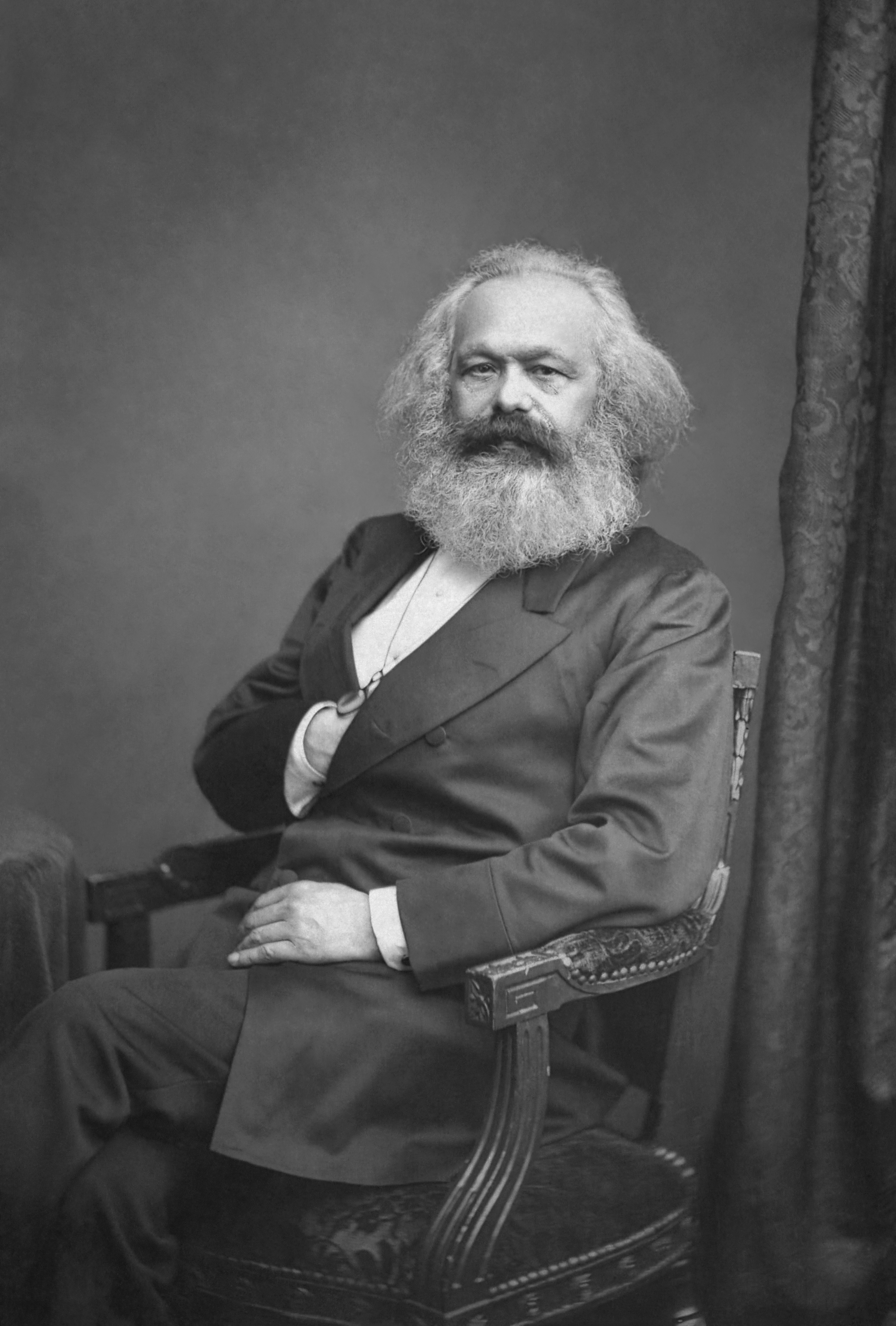
Karl Marx developed the concept of primitive accumulation as a critique of classical political economy's origin stories of capitalism.

Marx rejected Smith's explanation as a "fairy tale" that served to justify the existing economic inequality. He argued that this story was equivalent to the theological concept of original sin, which explains poverty by recounting how a group of people in a distant past were condemned for their transgressions. Marx wrote, "This primitive accumulation plays in Political Economy about the same part as original sin in theology. Adam bit the apple, and thereupon sin fell on the human race... So it is alleged that there was a time, long ago, when there were two sorts of people; one, the diligent, intelligent, and, above all, frugal elite; the other, lazy rascals, spending their substance, and more, in riotous living."

To distinguish his concept from Smith's, Marx, in translating Smith's "previous" accumulation into German as ursprünglich ("original" or "primary"), prefixed it with the pejorative "so-called" (sogenannte). Marx insisted that the real process was one of violent expropriation. He summarized this history by stating that "capital comes dripping from head to toe, from every pore, with blood and dirt".

For Marx, primitive accumulation was not simply the accumulation of wealth, but a fundamental transformation of social property relations. It was the historical process that created the essential preconditions for capitalism: the separation of a large population from their means of subsistence, creating a class of "free" proletarians who had no choice but to sell their labour-power to capital. This expropriation, which Marx located primarily in the English countryside, was "written in the annals of mankind in letters of blood and fire". It was this transformation, rather than the simple accumulation of money, that generated the unique dynamics of capitalism: the imperatives of competition, profit-maximization, and a constant need to improve labour productivity.

== Role of classical political economy ==
According to Michael Perelman, the violent process of primitive accumulation was not an unforeseen byproduct of the rise of capitalism but a central objective actively pursued by classical political economists. He argues that behind the public-facing ideology of laissez-faire was a "secret history" in which these thinkers vigorously promoted state-led coercion to create a suitable workforce for capital. While they championed the virtues of the free market in their theoretical writings, their more practical works, letters, and diaries reveal a consistent pattern of advocating for policies that deprived people of their economic independence.

The central problem for early capitalists and political economists was the reluctance of the majority of the population, particularly in rural Britain, to voluntarily engage in wage labour as long as they had access to alternative means of subsistence. This self-provisioning, based on access to common lands and traditional rights, allowed for a degree of independence that was seen as a barrier to industrial development. Political economists and their supporters therefore waged a "war on sloth", denouncing any behaviour by the poor that did not contribute to maximizing work effort.

- Idleness and holidays: Precapitalist societies in Europe enjoyed a great deal of leisure time, with numerous religious holidays punctuating the work year. In the 16th and 17th centuries, an estimated one-third of the year was dedicated to leisure. Classical writers saw this as a waste. William Petty, for instance, argued that the law should allow labourers "but just wherewithal to live," because if they were allowed double, "he works but half so much as he could have done". Francis Hutcheson, Adam Smith's teacher, suggested that "temporary servitude at least" should be used to punish idleness. There was a broad campaign, particularly strong among Protestant clergy, to eradicate religious holidays to increase the number of working days.
- The ideal working day: The ideal society for many early classical writers was one where the poor worked every waking hour. Proposals were made to put children to work from as young as three or four years old. The philosopher John Locke, often considered a theorist of liberty, advocated for work to begin at the age of three. Jeremy Bentham, a zealous advocate of laissez-faire, designed the Panopticon, a prison engineered for maximum control and profit from inmate labour. He dreamed of a National Charity Company that would have absolute authority over the "burdensome poor," whom he saw as raw material to be converted into profit through unremitting supervision and discipline.

This project of creating a disciplined workforce was predicated on stripping away the alternative means of survival, leaving people "free" in the double sense that they were free from coercion but also "free" of any property, with no choice but to work for wages.

== Mechanisms of primitive accumulation ==
Primitive accumulation was carried out through a variety of mechanisms, both legal and extralegal, designed to sever the link between direct producers and their means of subsistence. In the view of historian E. P. Thompson, this was not a matter of abstract economic forces but a tangible historical process of struggle, in which "class happens when some men, as a result of common experiences (inherited or shared), feel and articulate the identity of their interests as between themselves, and as against other men whose interests are different from (and usually opposed to) theirs."

=== Enclosures and land expropriation ===
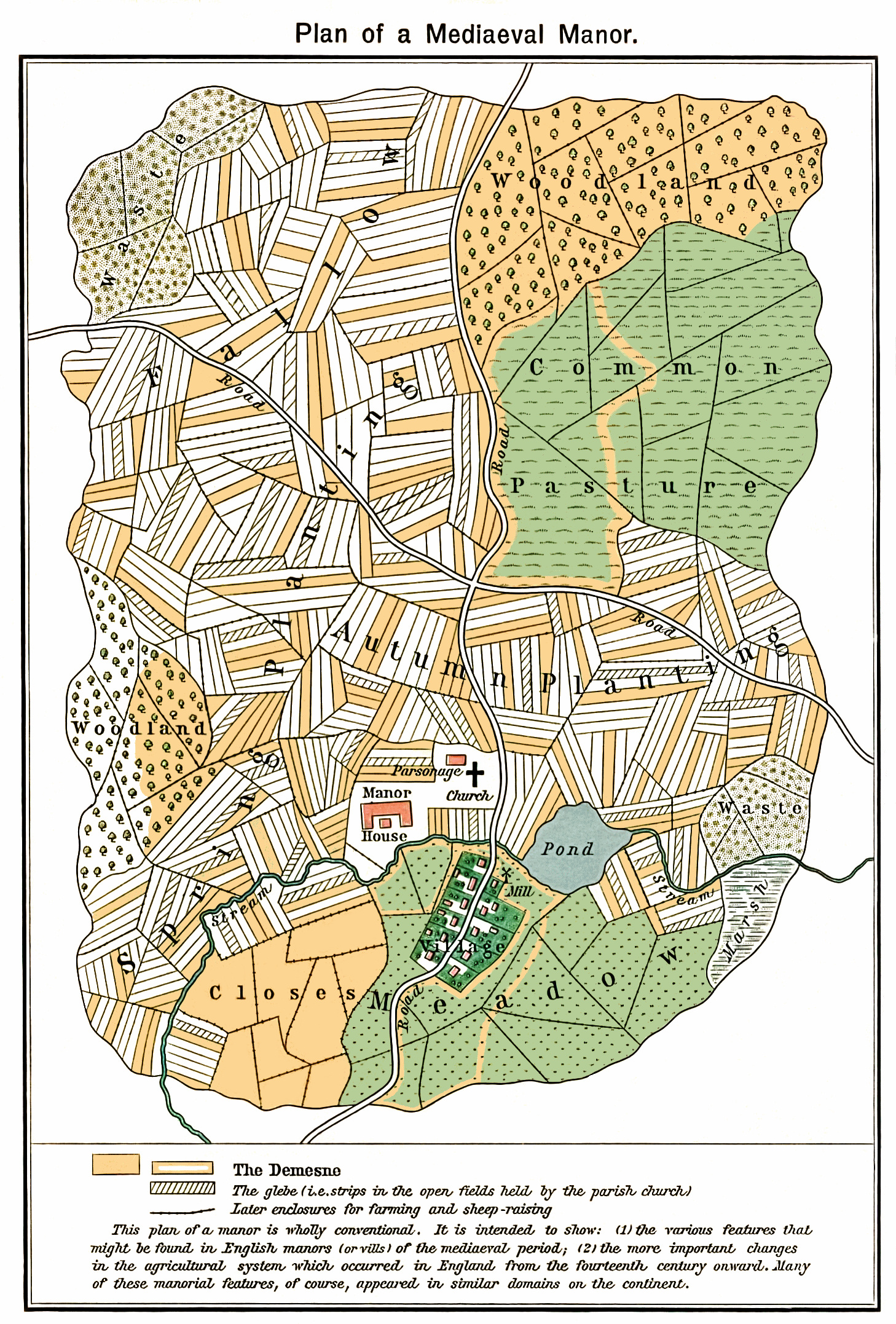
Typical plan of a medieval English manor. The part allocated to "common pasture" is shown in the north-east section, shaded green.

The most well-known form of primitive accumulation was the Enclosure of common lands in Britain. For centuries, the peasantry had traditional rights to use common lands for grazing livestock, gathering firewood, and foraging. As historian Joan Thirsk notes, these commons "kept alive a vigorous co-operative spirit," but enclosures "starved it". For Thompson, the enclosure movement was "a plain enough case of class robbery", a process that destroyed the "scratch-as-scratch-can subsistence economy of the poor" by taking away their rights to the cow or geese, fuel from the common, and gleanings.

This process was part of a broader transformation of social property relations that was unique to early modern England. Termed "agrarian capitalism", this system arose from a situation in which land was unusually concentrated in the hands of landlords, and a large proportion of the agricultural population consisted of tenants. Unlike peasants in other countries, such as France, many English tenants lacked secure tenure and had to pay rents determined by market conditions. Both landlords and tenants became dependent on the market for their survival, which created intense competitive pressures to increase productivity and reduce costs—a dynamic known as "improvement".

The ideology of "improvement", meaning the profitable use of land, became the justification for extinguishing traditional rights that stood in the way of accumulation. The philosopher John Locke articulated the classic theoretical defence for this new form of property. In his Second Treatise of Government (1689), he argued that private property is created when an individual "mixes his labour" with nature, but his definition of "labour" was tied to the creation of commercial value. Land that was not productively improved for profit was considered "waste", and could therefore be legitimately appropriated by those who would make it profitable.

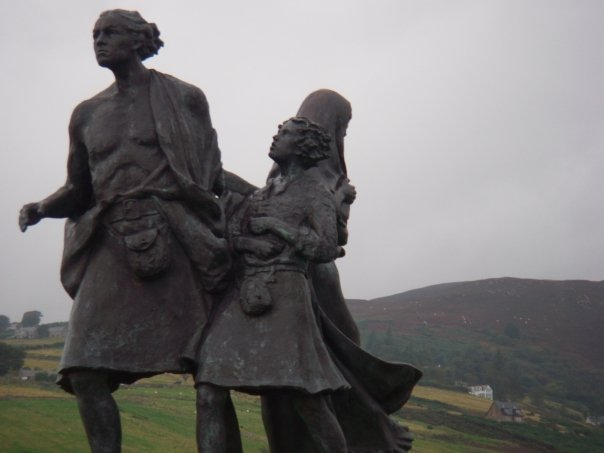
Statue in Helmsdale, Scotland, depicting emigrants from the Highland Clearances

Beginning with the Tudors and accelerating dramatically in the 18th and 19th centuries, a series of Parliamentary Acts transferred these common lands into the hands of private landlords. While formally legal, this process was an expropriation of traditional rights that had been the basis of peasant subsistence. This dispossession was accomplished, in Marx's words, "by means of the most merciless barbarianism, and under the stimulus of the most infamous, the most sordid, the most petty and the most odious of passions". The process was particularly brutal in the Highland Clearances of Scotland, where entire villages were burned to make way for sheep pastures. Between 1814 and 1820, for example, the Duchess of Sutherland evicted 15,000 inhabitants from 794,000 acres of land, replacing them with 131,000 sheep. This dispossession was accompanied by harsh vagrancy laws, dating back to the 16th century, which criminalized the landless poor and subjected them to flogging, branding, and execution if they did not submit to wage labour.

=== The Game Laws ===
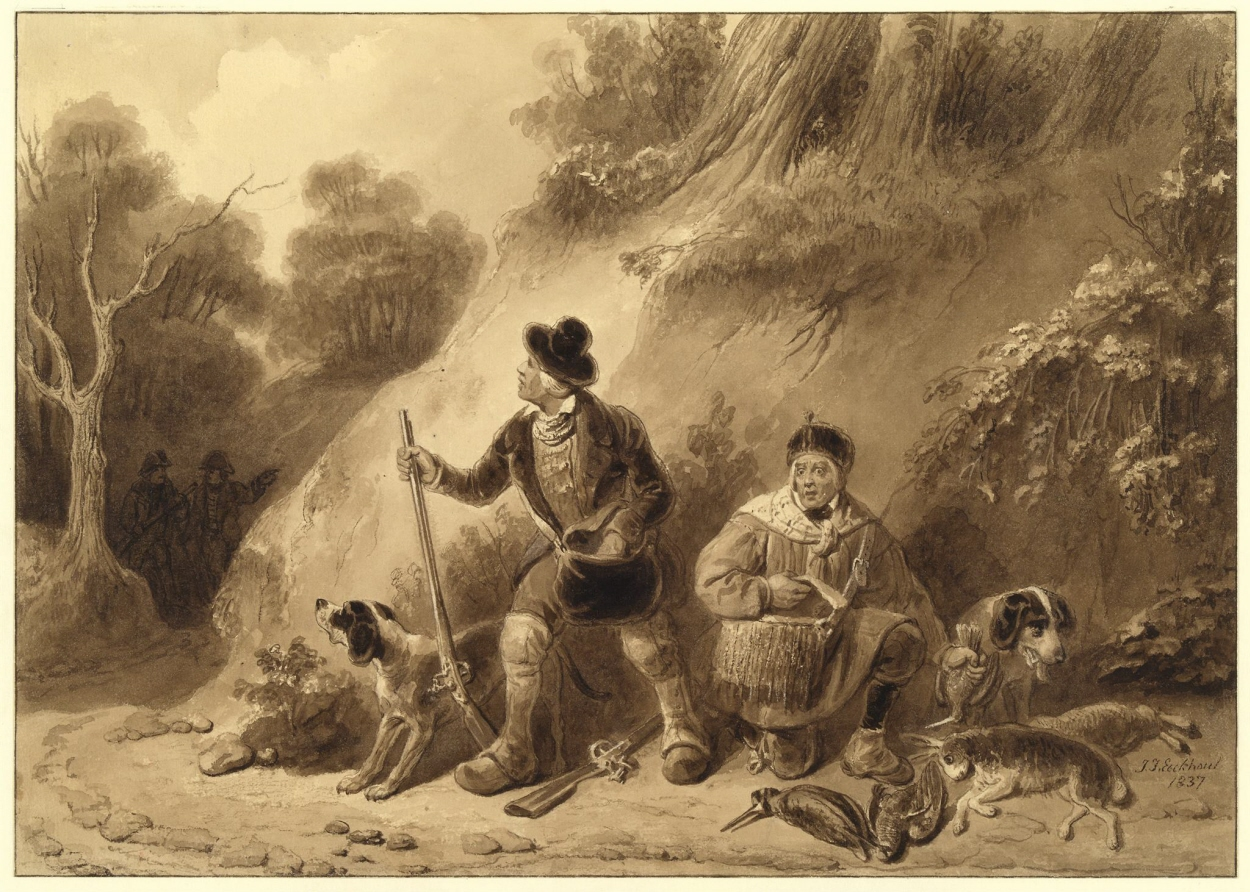
Poachers (1831) by Jacobus Josephus Eeckhout

Another powerful instrument of primitive accumulation in Britain was the Game Laws. While feudal in origin, these laws were revived and enforced with unprecedented ferocity during the Industrial Revolution. The modern English Game Laws began in 1671, with a preamble explicitly aimed at preventing "inferior tradesmen, apprentices, and other dissolute persons" from "neglecting their trades and employments" to hunt or fish. These laws stripped rural people of a major source of sustenance, as hunting had been an important means of providing food for one's family. The penalties for poaching became increasingly severe; the Black Act of 1723 made poaching a capital offence, and many poachers were executed or transported to Australia. For Thompson, the Game Laws were one of several measures, alongside high taxes and enclosures, that "tighten[ed] the screw upon the labourer" after the French Revolution.

The Game Laws not only deprived the poor of food but also protected animals that destroyed a significant share of the nation's agricultural produce. Hares and pheasants, protected for the sport of the gentry, ravaged crops, while hunters and their horses trampled fields with impunity. Classical political economists, despite their supposed concern for efficiency, remained almost entirely silent about the enormous waste caused by the Game Laws, a silence that amounted to effective support for this instrument of repression. Adam Smith was a rare exception, though he dismissed the laws as a mere residue of feudalism, obscuring their role in furthering the interests of capital by creating a dependent workforce.

=== The social division of labor ===
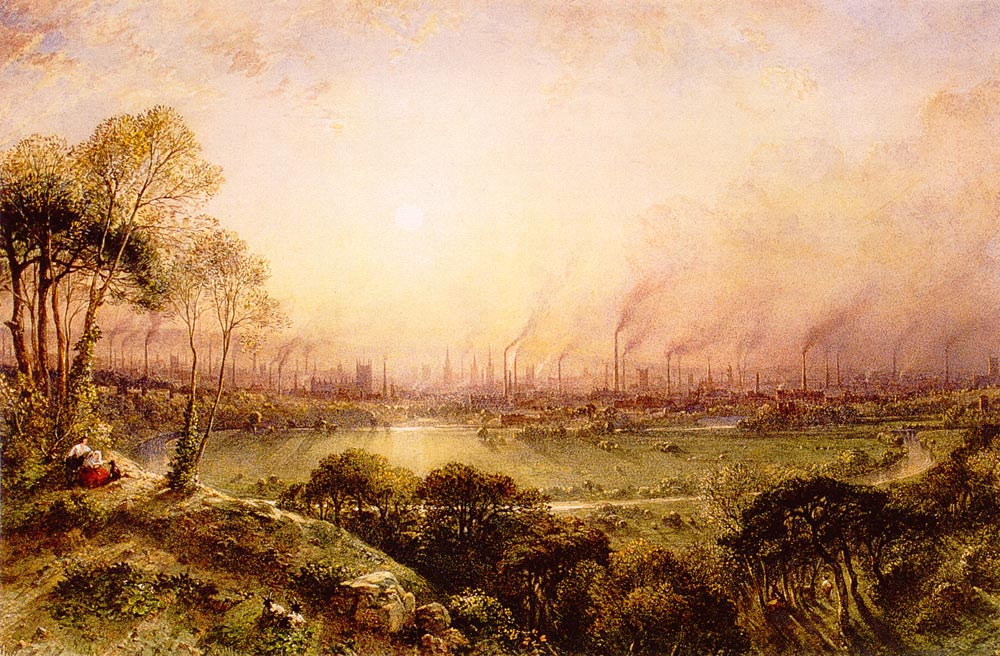
Manchester from Kersal Moor (1857) by William Wyld

Perelman argues that the core of primitive accumulation can be understood as the forcible restructuring of the social division of labor. This term, used by Marx in contrast to Smith's concept of the division of labour, refers not to the arrangement of tasks within a single workshop (like Smith's pin factory), but to the partitioning of production among different independent firms, industries, and households across society.

In precapitalist societies, the household was an "independent center of production," where a family produced most of its own food, clothing, and other necessities. The project of primitive accumulation was to break down this self-sufficiency and separate household production from commodity production. By destroying the ability of households to provide for themselves, capital forced people to specialize in producing a single commodity and then sell their labour-power for a wage in order to buy the necessities of life on the market. This process creates what classical economists called a "great commercial family" based on mutual dependence, but it also creates the wage-labour relationship itself.

=== The imposition of industrial discipline ===
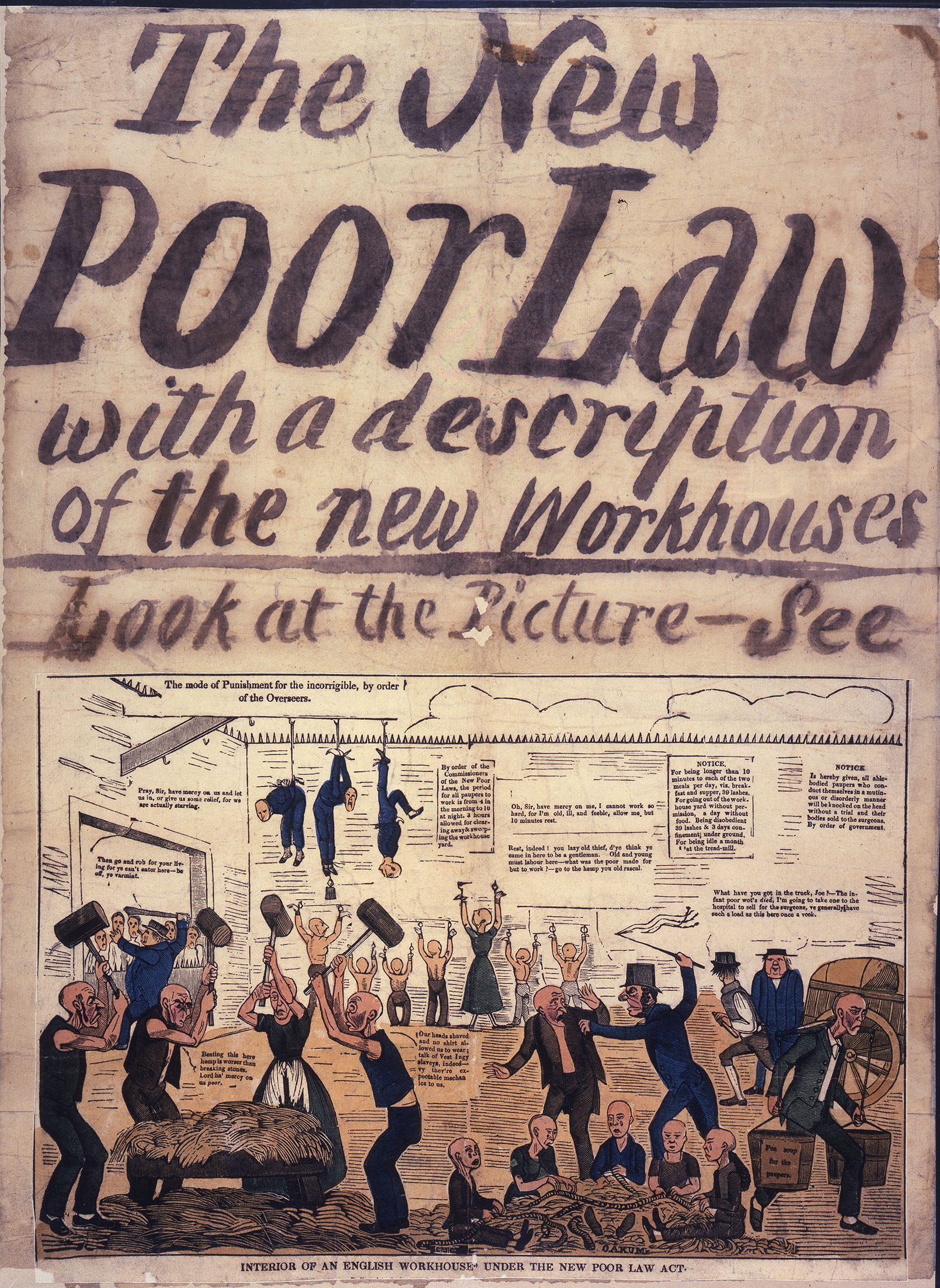
1837 poster depicting conditions at an English workhouse under the Poor Law Amendment Act 1834

A central component of primitive accumulation was the imposition of a new and rigid work-discipline suited to the factory system. E. P. Thompson contrasts the task-oriented, irregular rhythms of pre-industrial labor with the timed, methodical discipline of industrial capitalism. For the peasant, artisan, or weaver, the distinction between "work" and "life" was not clearly drawn; work was often social and self-directed. The introduction of the factory clock, the foreman, and the fine book represented a violent cultural shift. This new discipline was resisted, not because workers were naturally "idle", but because it represented the loss of autonomy and a new form of "time-thrifty" exploitation.

Thompson argues that Methodism played a crucial ideological role in this process, serving as the "psychic component of the work-discipline". The Methodist emphasis on thrift, sobriety, and methodical conduct, its hostility to traditional holidays and amusements, and its doctrine of a working life spent under the eye of a divine "Task-master" all served to internalize the discipline required by the factory. While intended to save souls, the effect was to produce a more compliant and diligent workforce. This "moral machinery" was explicitly recognized by some employers as more effective than direct coercion; the industrialist Robert Peel noted in 1787, "I have left most of my works in Lancashire under the management of Methodists, and they serve me excellently well."

=== Subjugation of women and the body ===
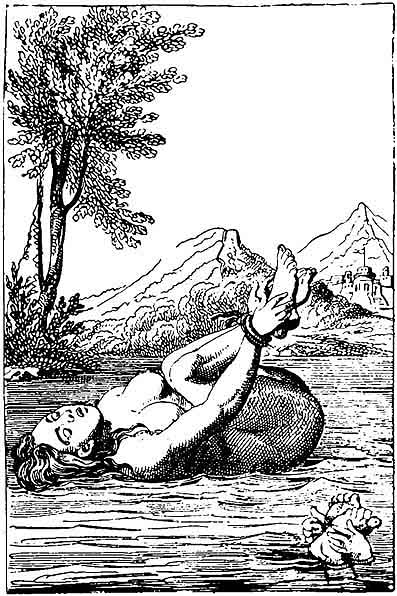
17th-century depiction of an ordeal by water, a commonly-used practice in witch-hunts

Building on Marx's work, Silvia Federici argues that primitive accumulation was fundamentally a process of disciplining the body, transforming it into a work-machine capable of exploitation. This attack on the pre-capitalist body was particularly directed at women, whose bodies and reproductive labor were expropriated and placed in the service of capital accumulation. This "war against women" intensified in the context of the demographic and economic crises of the 16th and 17th centuries, which created a labor shortage and made the reproduction of the workforce a central concern for the emerging capitalist state. States began to implement pro-natalist policies, launching a severe attack on women's control over their bodies. This included the criminalization of contraception, abortion, and infanticide, which had previously been treated with more leniency. The persecution also targeted female healers and midwives, who were the traditional depositories of women's reproductive knowledge, gradually replacing them with male-dominated medical professions.

This process was accompanied by the creation of a new sexual division of labor and a new patriarchal order, which Federici terms the "patriarchy of the wage." As women were excluded from many waged occupations and their unpaid domestic labor was devalued as "non-work," they became dependent on male wage-earners. The male wage thus became an instrument for commanding the unpaid reproductive labor of women, who, in Federici's analysis, became the "new commons" for the proletariat, a substitute for the land lost to enclosure.

The witch-hunts of the early modern period were the culmination of this campaign of state-sponsored terror. Federici argues that the persecution was instrumental in breaking the resistance of the peasantry, destroying a world of female-centered practices and knowledge, and demonizing female sexuality and reproductive control. The image of the witch—a rebellious, sexually insubordinate woman who used her body for non-procreative ends—was the ideological tool used to enforce a new model of femininity based on passivity and domesticity.

== Theoretical aspects ==
=== Global dimensions and colonialism ===
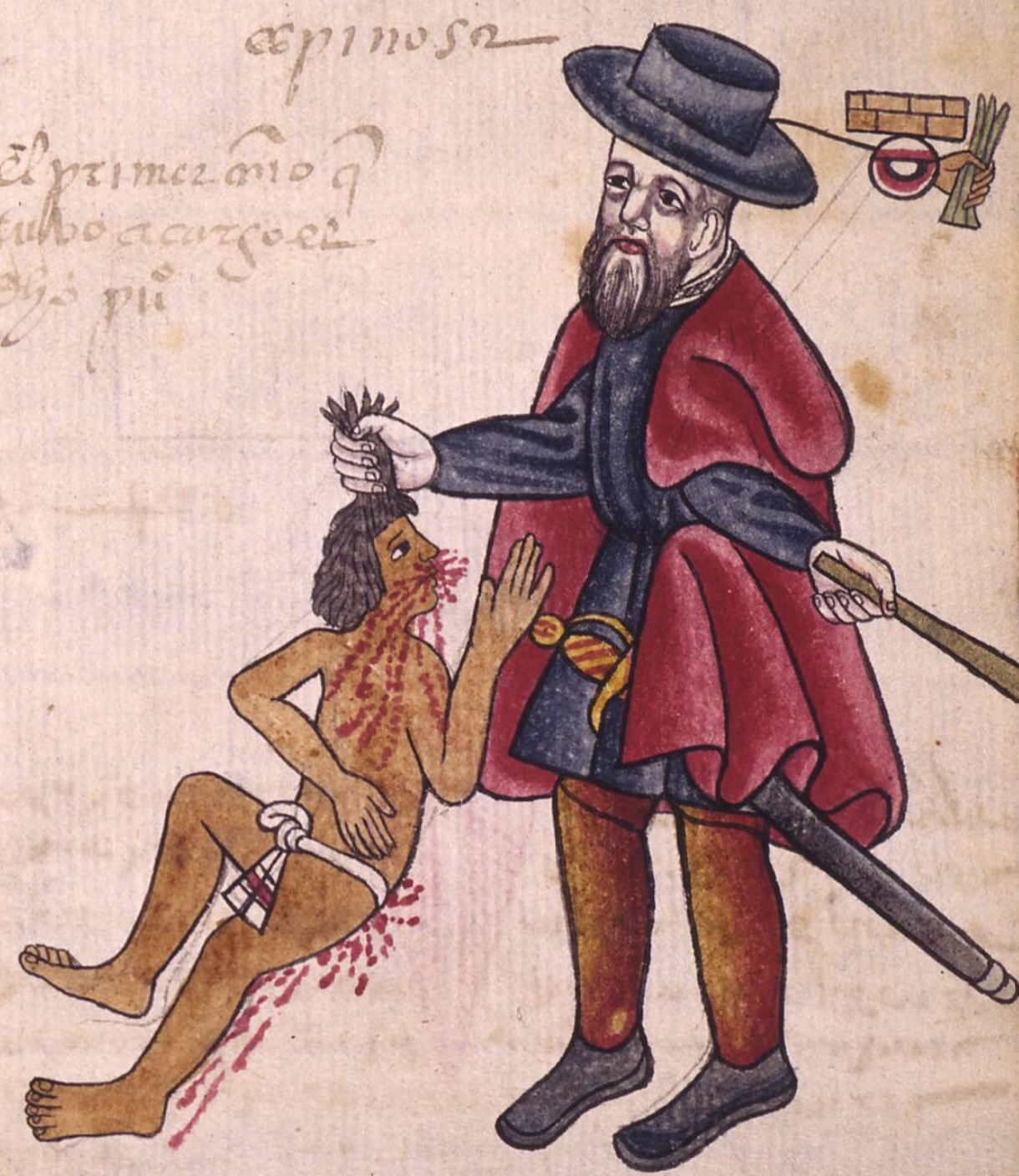
16th-century depiction of a Spanish encomendero abusing an indigenous worker

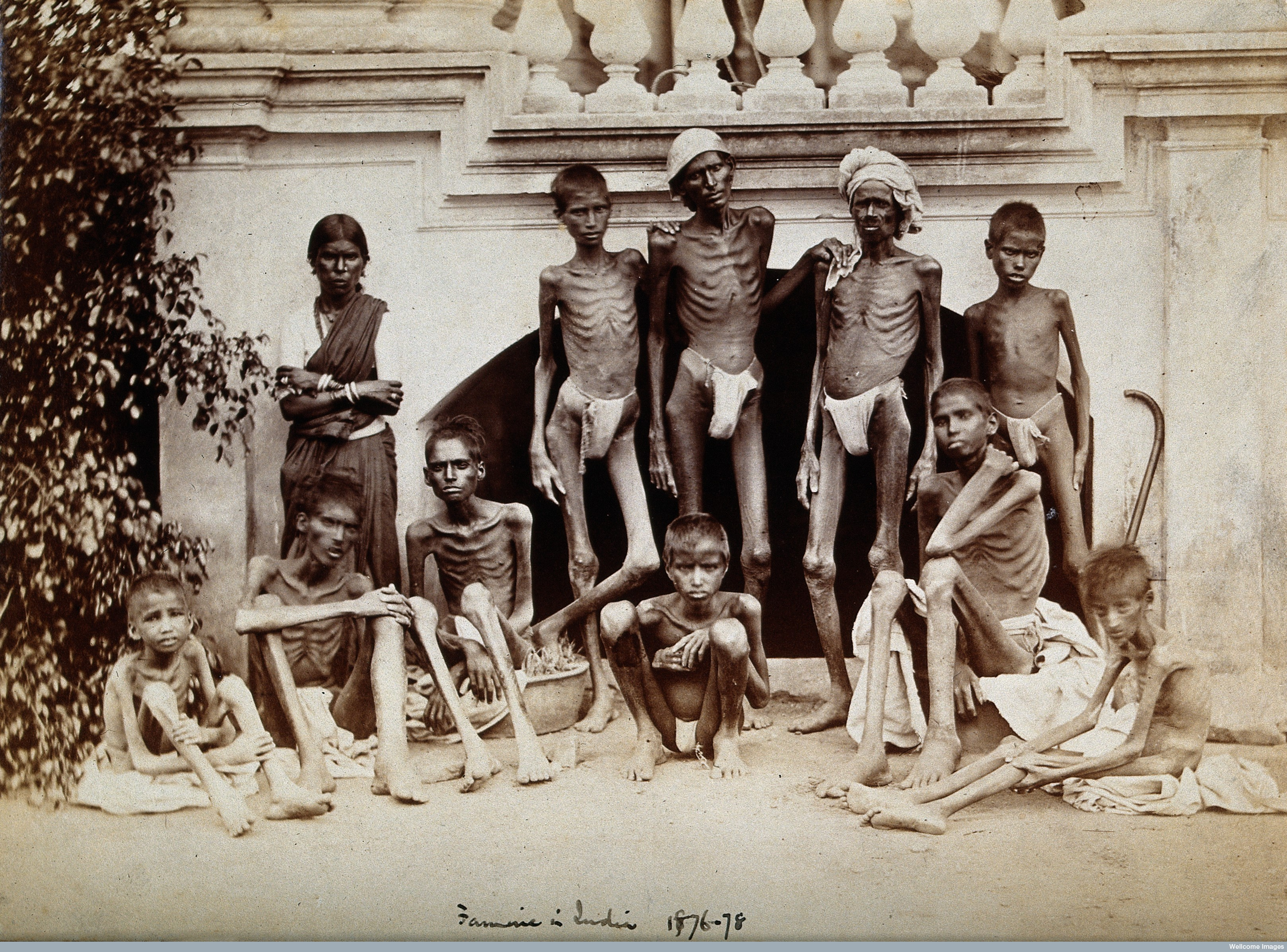
Victims of starvation during the Great Famine of 1876–1878 in Bangalore, British-ruled India

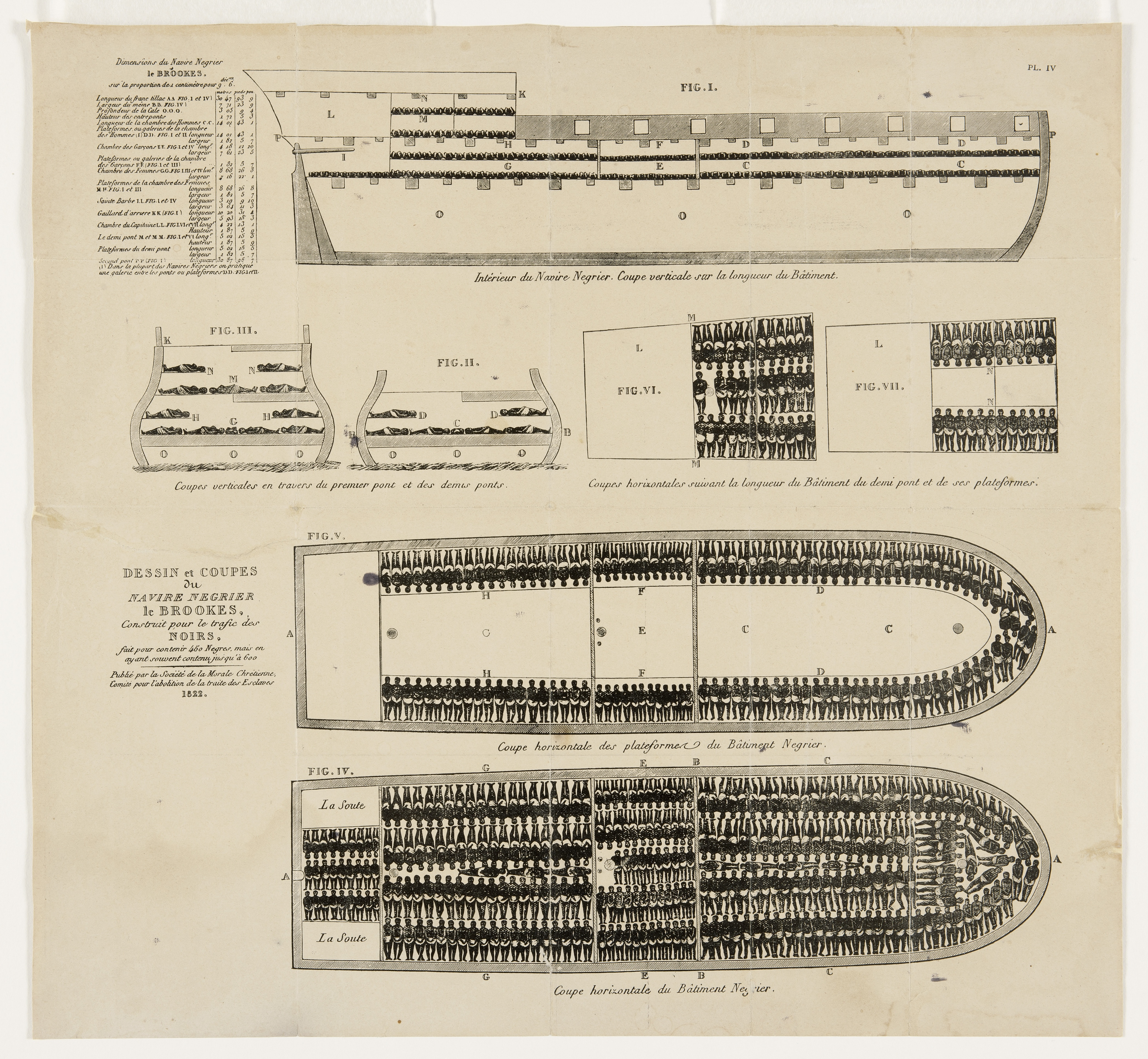
Diagram of the British slave ship Brookes in 1788, depicting the conditions of African slaves during the Atlantic slave trade

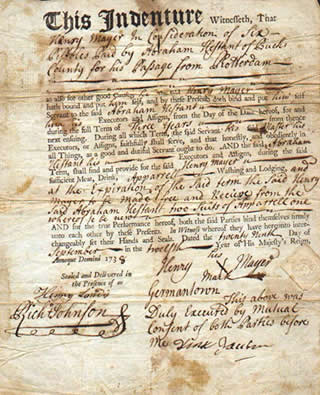
Contract establishing the indenture of a European indentured servant, 1738

Marx located the "chief moments of primitive accumulation" in the brutal history of colonialism. He wrote: "The discovery of gold and silver in America, the extirpation, enslavement and entombment in mines of the indigenous population, the beginnings of the conquest and plunder of India, and the conversion of Africa into a preserve for the commercial hunting of blackskins, are all things which characterize the dawn of the era of capitalist production." Once established in one country, the imperatives of capitalism were imposed on other nations through geopolitical and commercial competition, compelling them to follow a similar path of development.

Ellen Meiksins Wood distinguishes between pre-capitalist and capitalist forms of imperialism. Pre-capitalist empires, like the Spanish in the Americas or the French in Canada, were based on "extra-economic" appropriation, such as extracting tribute and bullion, or controlling the fur trade. In contrast, a new, specifically capitalist form of imperialism emerged with the English. Pioneered in Ireland in the late 16th century, this model was not primarily about plunder but about transplanting capitalist social property relations. The English sought to subdue the Irish by violently expropriating their land and imposing a new economic order based on the principles of "improvement" and market-based tenancies that had developed in England. The ideology of "improvement", articulated by figures like John Locke, was used to justify the dispossession of indigenous peoples in both Ireland and North America on the grounds that their land was not being used profitably enough and was therefore "waste".

The North American colonies played a central, though contradictory, role in the ideology of classical political economy. Adam Smith presented the colonies as an ideal laboratory where, due to cheap land, both wages and profits were high, proving the harmony of interests between labour and capital. However, this picture ignored the reality that the majority of the colonial workforce was unfree, consisting of slaves and indentured servants. Theorists like Edward Gibbon Wakefield recognized the truth that Smith obscured: where land is cheap and people can easily provide for themselves, capital cannot find a willing supply of wage-labour. Wakefield argued that this "cheapness of land [was]... the cause of slavery". His proposed solution was "systematic colonization", a policy of artificially raising the price of land in the colonies to prevent labourers from becoming independent too quickly, thereby ensuring a steady supply of wage-earners for capitalists.

The connection between the subjugation of European workers and colonized populations is central to the concept of primitive accumulation. Silvia Federici argues that the European witch-hunts and the persecution of indigenous peoples in the Americas were mutually reinforcing processes. The demonization of Native Americans as cannibals and devil-worshippers provided a template and justification for the mass persecution in Europe. Conversely, the methods of terror and extermination developed in the Americas were re-imported to Europe to be used against the 'savages' at home—rebellious peasants and, above all, 'witches.' This created an international division of labor in which racial and sexual hierarchies were foundational to the accumulation of capital on a world scale.

=== Primitive socialist accumulation ===
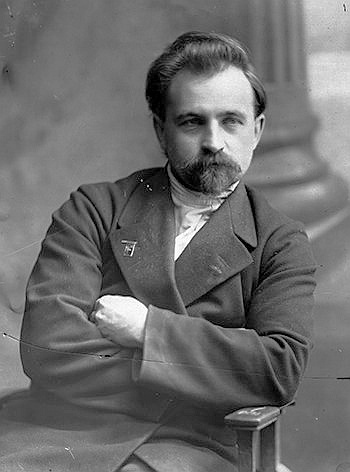
Yevgeni Preobrazhensky

While Marx developed his concept to analyze the rise of capitalism, it was repurposed by Yevgeni Preobrazhensky, a Bolshevik theorist and member of the Left Opposition, to address the challenges of socialist development in the Soviet Union. In his 1926 work, The New Economics, Preobrazhensky theorized "primitive socialist accumulation" as a necessary stage for the industrialization of an underdeveloped, peasant-majority country. He argued that the state sector (socialist industry) would have to extract a surplus from the peasant sector (private commodity production) to fund its growth, in a process analogous to capitalism's original accumulation.

Preobrazhensky's theory was central to the great Soviet economic debate of the 1920s. He saw the Soviet economy under the New Economic Policy (NEP) as being governed by two competing regulators: the "law of value" in the private sector and the "law of primitive socialist accumulation" in the state sector. The struggle for dominance between these two forces would determine the country's fate. His proposed method for extracting surplus was not based on violent expropriation but on a non-coercive price policy where the state would use its monopoly on industry to set unequal exchange rates between agricultural and industrial goods. Preobrazhensky insisted that this must not involve hyper-exploitation and did not envision forced collectivization, which he believed would be a slow, voluntary process lasting decades. His goal was to use the transferred surplus to finance industrialization, which would ultimately raise living standards for both workers and peasants. Preobrazhensky's ideas were defeated, and he was executed in 1937. Joseph Stalin's policy of forced collectivization from 1928 onward, while sometimes seen as an implementation of Preobrazhensky's ideas, was in fact a brutal distortion that substituted state violence for the planned economic mechanisms he had advocated.

The problem identified by Preobrazhensky—how to fund industrialization in a peasant-based economy—was faced by other socialist states, and the processes of accumulation in these countries shared similarities with capitalist primitive accumulation.

- In China following the 1949 revolution, the state followed the Soviet model of a first Five-Year Plan, forced collectivization, and surplus extraction from the peasantry, which led to the famine of the Great Leap Forward. The state used a household registration system to control migration, and women's unremunerated labor in household textile production was a crucial source of accumulation that enabled industrial development.
- In Romania, primitive accumulation was conceptualized as a centuries-long process that continued under capitalism and socialism. The socialist state used the peasantry to fund industrialization through a system of "postponed proletarianization", where rural households absorbed the costs of social reproduction, allowing the state and employers to pay urban workers below-subsistence wages.

While socialist primitive accumulation was state-planned and compressed into a much shorter timeframe, it shared with its capitalist predecessor the features of peasant dispossession, state coercion to control movement, violence, and extraction from the laboring classes. However, there were key differences. Under socialism, land was not privatized, but collectivized, with most peasants remaining on the land. It was the wealthier peasants who were dispossessed, not the poor. Forced labor took the form of labor camps rather than chattel slavery, and while wealth disparities existed, they were far smaller than in capitalist countries.

=== Historical event versus ongoing process ===
A key debate in the theory of primitive accumulation concerns whether it is a one-time historical event that served as a precondition for capitalism, or an ongoing process that continues within capitalism itself. Marx's own writings are ambiguous on this point. At times, particularly in the Grundrisse and in some passages of Das Kapital, he presents primitive accumulation as belonging to the "pre-history" of capital, a process that ceases once capitalism is established and can reproduce itself through the "silent compulsion of economic relations". In this view, once the working class is created and accustomed by "education, tradition, and habit" to the requirements of the system, direct extra-economic force becomes exceptional.

However, other parts of Marx's work, especially his analysis of colonialism and the theories of Wakefield, suggest that primitive accumulation is a continuous process. Perelman argues for this latter interpretation, contending that the separation of people from their means of non-market subsistence is a recurring feature of capitalist development. Modern examples can be seen in the commodification of previously domestic activities. For instance, the rise of commercial laundries, fast-food restaurants, and childcare centres reflects a shift of production from the household to the market. This shift forces families to earn more wages to purchase services they once produced themselves, thereby deepening their dependence on the market and increasing the supply of wage labour, particularly from women. Federici likewise argues that primitive accumulation is a 'universal' and continuous process, identifying contemporary globalization, structural adjustment programs, and the 'feminization of poverty' as modern forms of this dispossession.

=== Accumulation by dispossession ===
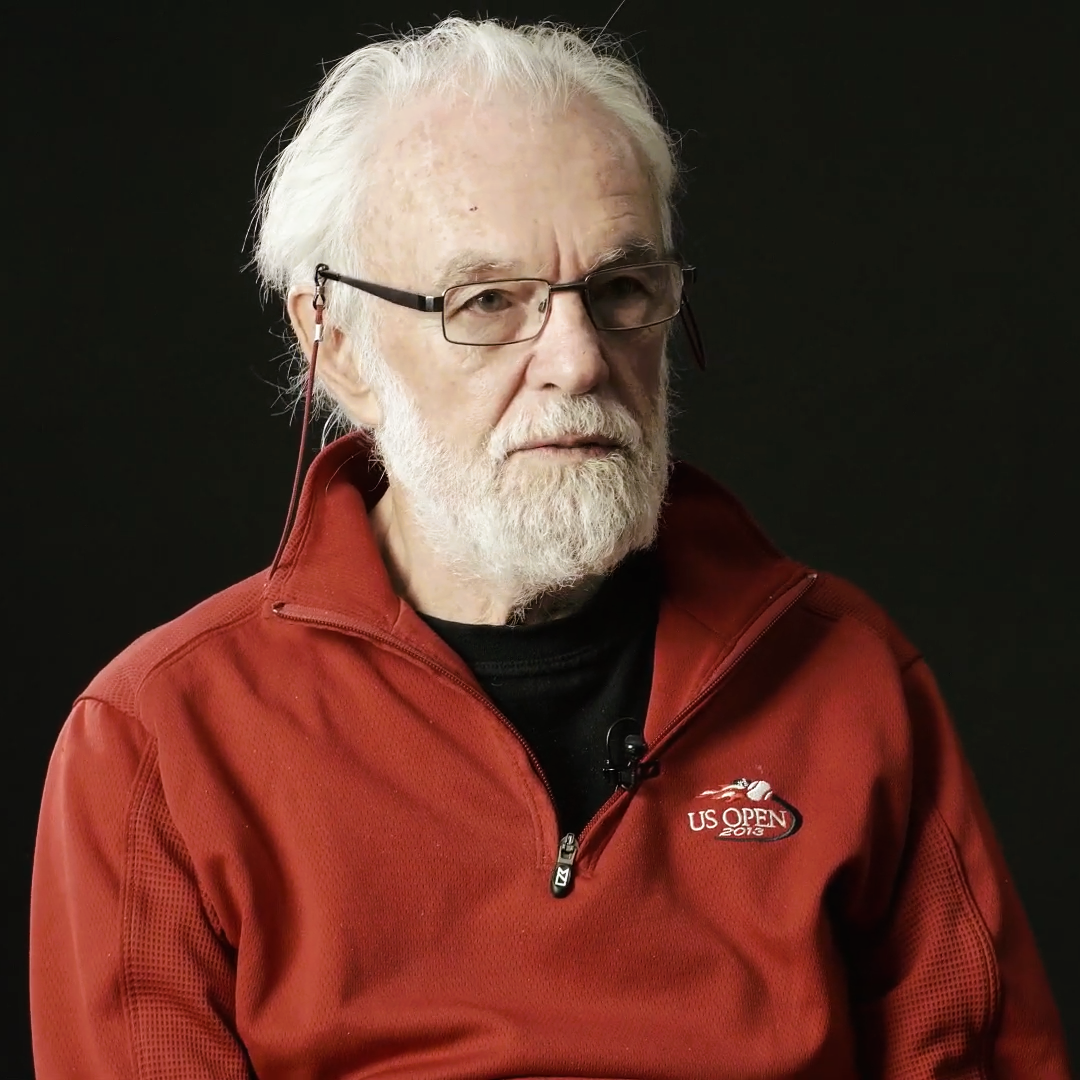
David Harvey

Geographer David Harvey has significantly expanded on the idea of primitive accumulation as an ongoing process, coining the term 'accumulation by dispossession'. Harvey argues that the term 'primitive' is misleading, as the violent, predatory practices it describes are a constant feature of capitalism, not a relic of its past. He builds upon Hannah Arendt's observation that the "original sin of simple robbery... had eventually to be repeated lest the motor of accumulation suddenly die down". For Harvey, accumulation by dispossession functions as a crucial mechanism for resolving capitalism's chronic tendency toward crises of overaccumulation—a condition where surplus capital lies idle with no profitable outlets. Dispossession releases a pool of assets at little to no cost, which overaccumulated capital can then seize and use to restart a new round of accumulation.

Harvey identifies several mechanisms of accumulation by dispossession that are prevalent in the contemporary neoliberal era:

- Privatization of public assets and common property resources, such as public utilities, social housing, and state-owned enterprises. Harvey points to the mass privatization of council housing under Margaret Thatcher in Britain as a prime example, which released vast assets for speculation. Other examples include the privatization of water in post-apartheid South Africa and of the communally-held ejido lands in Mexico following the NAFTA agreement.
- Financialization through speculation, asset stripping, Ponzi schemes, and the promotion of debt peonage. Harvey argues that the credit system remains a "radical means of primitive accumulation". Crises, often managed by international institutions like the International Monetary Fund (IMF), become a primary pretext for privatizing assets. The 1997 Asian financial crisis, for instance, led to the massive devaluation of local assets, allowing Western and Japanese corporations to acquire them at "fire-sale" prices in what was described as "the biggest peacetime transfer of assets from domestic to foreign owners in the past fifty years".
- Commodification of "the commons" including intellectual property rights (through the TRIPS Agreement), biopiracy of genetic materials, and the enclosure of cultural and environmental commons.

Harvey emphasizes the "organic link" between accumulation through the expanded reproduction of capital (the process Marx detailed in Das Kapital) and accumulation by dispossession. He argues that the traditional left made a "fatal mistake" by focusing almost exclusively on struggles within the realm of expanded reproduction (such as those at the point of production), thereby ignoring the pervasive violence of dispossession. This led to a political disconnect between traditional "workerist" movements and the diverse, often localized struggles against dispossession, such as those of the Zapatistas or anti-dam protestors in India. Harvey contends that a coherent anti-capitalist and anti-imperialist politics must unite these two domains of struggle.

== Historiography ==
The brutal history of primitive accumulation has largely been written out of mainstream economic thought, a process that began with Adam Smith's "charming obfuscation of class". Smith's narrative of a peaceful, voluntary transition to capitalism, symbolized by the invisible hand, became the dominant ideology, while the more honest and brutal analyses of his contemporaries were ignored.

Sir James Steuart, for example, wrote with blunt frankness about the need for a "statesman" to coercively restructure the social division of labor, break down self-sufficiency, and create a dependent workforce. He acknowledged that this transformation would make people "slaves to their own wants". Because of this uncomfortable honesty, Steuart's work was largely ignored and he was dismissed as a late mercantilist, despite his sophisticated analysis. Smith, in contrast, concealed this process behind a veil of "natural liberty," earning him widespread acclaim. Similarly, the work of Edward Gibbon Wakefield, which explicitly linked cheap land to a lack of wage labour and advocated for state intervention to create "natural slavery," was adopted by policymakers but its harsher theoretical implications were softened by disciples like John Stuart Mill.

According to Perelman, this revision of history has been immensely successful, creating the impression of a "humanitarian heritage of political economy" and obscuring the central role that violent dispossession played, and continues to play, in the accumulation of capital. In the 20th century, a school of "optimistic" economic historians, such as John Clapham and T. S. Ashton, further cemented this legacy by arguing that the Industrial Revolution was primarily a story of improvement, not catastrophe. It was in direct opposition to this "anti-catastrophic orthodoxy" that historians like E. P. Thompson sought to recover the lived experience of the working people who were subjected to the "truly catastrophic nature of the Industrial Revolution".

== See also ==
- Brenner debate
- Dobb–Sweezy debate
- History of capitalism
- Relations of production
- Subsumption (Marxism)
- The Accumulation of Capital
- The Origin of the Family, Private Property and the State
- The Servile State
