= Guy Bois =

Guy Bois may refer to:

- Guy Pène du Bois (1884–1958), American painter and art critic
- Guy Bois (historian) (1934–2019), French historian
