= Arnošt Klíma =

Arnošt Klíma (1 March 1916 – 4 January 2000) was a Czech historian. He was most noted for his work on the economic and social history of the Czech-speaking region in the 17th to 19th centuries. He was a member correspondent of the Czechoslovak Academy of Sciences and professor of the Faculty of Arts, Charles University in Prague. He also translated extensively from German. He is particularly noted in Anglophone scholarship for his contribution to the Brenner Debate on the origins of capitalism.

== Biography ==
Klíma was born on 1 March 1916 in Klimkovice in Austrian Silesia. From 1947 to 1981 Klíma lectured on modern history at the Faculty of Education at the Charles University in Prague. In 1947, he was historical advisor on the film Revoluční rok (1848) by Václav Krška. In 1948 he became an associate professor and in 1951 a professor at Charles University. At the beginning of the 1960s, he was a visiting professor at the University of Leipzig. During the period of liberalization, he spent 1968–69 as a visiting scholar in the USA (Madison). At the beginning of the nineties, Arnošt Klima devoted himself to preparing the writing of his memoirs. However, during the period of Normalisation, Klíma became "a persona non grata for political reasons" in Czechoslovakia. He was during this time elected to the steering committee of the World Congress of Economic Historians, and was noted for "his endeavours to establish contacts with the historians of the Soviet bloc", but was prevented by the Czechoslovak government from participating in the committee or congresses. The chapter of Klíma's otherwise unpublished memoirs on this matter has been published.

Klíma died on 4 January 2000 in Prague, aged 83.

== Key works ==
- Počátky českého dělnického hnutí (Prague: Svoboda, 1950)
- Manufakturní období v Čechách (Prague: Nakladatelství Československé akademie věd, 1955)
- Čechy v období temna, Živá minulost, 34 (Prague: Naše vojsko, 1958)
- Na prahu nové společnosti: (1781-1848) (Prague: Státní pedagogické nakladatelství, 1979)
- Economy, Industry and Society in Bohemia in the 17th-19th Centuries (Prague: Charles University, 1991), ISBN 8070665238 (articles in English and German reprinted from periodicals)
- Češi a Němci v revoluci 1848-1849 (Prague: Nebesa, 1994), ISBN 8090160972
- Dlouhá válka, 1618-1648 (Prague: Slovo, 1996), ISBN 8090014836

== Bibliographies ==
- Winters, Stanley B. "Publications of Arnost Klima, 1948-81." East Central Europe 9, no. 1-2 (1982): 3-6.
- Rudolph, Richard L. "Light in the Dark Ages in Czech Economic History: The Work of Arnost Klima." East Central Europe 9, no. 1-2 (1982): 39-48.
- Hahn, Fred. "From Darkness to Revolution in Bohemia: The Historical Writings of Arnost Klima." East Central Europe 9, no. 1-2 (1982): 49-83.
- http://biblio.hiu.cas.cz/authorities/222021
