= Past & Present (journal) =

- Discipline: History
- Language: English
- Edited by: Matthew Kelly; Alice Rio

Publication details
- History: 1952–present
- Publisher: Oxford University Press on behalf of the Past and Present Society (United Kingdom)
- Frequency: Quarterly
- Impact factor: 2.188

Standard abbreviations
- ISO 4: Past Present

Indexing
- ISSN: 0031-2746 (print); 1477-464X (web)
- LCCN: 65077388
- JSTOR: 00312746
- OCLC no.: 265436895

Links
- Journal homepage; Online archive

Past & Present is a British historical academic journal, which has been a leading force in the development of social history. Founded in 1952, the journal is published four times a year by Oxford University Press on behalf of the Past and Present Society, a British historical membership association and registered charity. The society also publishes a book series (Past and Present Publications), sponsors occasional conferences, and appoints postdoctoral fellows.

The current chair of the editorial board is Joanna Innes, the Winifred Holtby Fellow and Tutor in Modern History at Somerville College, University of Oxford.

== History ==
After the end of the Second World War, an emerging subfield of social history gradually became popular in history departments.

Past & Present thus emerged in 1952 as an alternative to mainstream political history journals. It was founded by a combination of Marxist and non-Marxist historians, including John Morris. The Marxist historians included members of the Communist Party Historians Group, including E. P. Thompson, Christopher Hill, Eric Hobsbawm, Raphael Samuel, Rodney Hilton, and Dona Torr. Gordon Childe was a founder member of the board. The journal previously had the subtitled A Journal of Scientific History. These figures often advocated History from Below in explaining the history of class, labour, and social relations.

Morris was the editor from 1952 until 1960 and remained as chairman of the editorial board until 1972.

Past & Present was simultaneously influenced by the Annales school of historians, which aimed to write history in its totality.

The History Workshop movement, founded in the 1960s, aimed to become a platform for the study of "ordinary people". The influence of Past & Present greatly expanded in the historical discipline after the publication of Thompson's The Making of the English Working Class in 1963.

== See also ==
- Brenner debate
- Historiography of the United Kingdom
