= Brenner debate =

Historiographical debate on the origin of capitalism

The Brenner debate was a major historiographical debate about the mechanisms that drove the transition from feudalism to capitalism in Europe. The debate began with an article by the Analytical Marxist historian Robert Brenner, "Agrarian Class Structure and Economic Development in Pre-Industrial Europe", published in the journal Past & Present in 1976. Brenner's thesis, which privileges the role of class structure and class conflict, challenged the prevailing neo-Malthusian or demographic models that had become orthodox in the preceding decades.

Brenner argued that economic changes, such as population growth or decline and the expansion of trade, could not in themselves determine the long-term trends of income distribution and economic growth. Instead, he proposed that these trends were fundamentally shaped by the structure of class relations, particularly the relations of surplus extraction between landlords and peasants, and the outcomes of class conflict. He argued that the specific nature of these "social-property relations" created a particular logic of development, with the imperatives of market competition driving producers in England toward capitalist practices as an unintended consequence of their attempts to reproduce themselves. Using a comparative historical analysis, primarily between England, France, and eastern Europe, he contended that different class structures in these regions caused them to follow divergent developmental paths, leading to the rise of agrarian capitalism in England while hindering it elsewhere.

Brenner's article sparked an intense discussion, with prominent historians offering critiques, defenses of existing models, and alternative interpretations. Key respondents included M. M. Postan, John Hatcher, and Emmanuel Le Roy Ladurie, who defended the demographic model; Guy Bois, who offered an alternative Marxist analysis; and others who challenged the empirical foundations of Brenner's comparative history. The original article, along with the major responses and Brenner's own extensive rejoinder, were collected and published in the book The Brenner Debate in 1985. The debate is considered a landmark in the study of pre-industrial Europe and revived interest in Marxist approaches to history, particularly the nature of the transition to capitalism.

== Background ==
The Brenner debate emerged within a long tradition of historiographical discussion concerning the decline of feudalism and the rise of capitalism, a theme dating back to the time of Karl Marx. In the mid-20th century, a well-known discussion on this topic, known as the Dobb–Sweezy debate, was conducted largely among Marxist scholars. This earlier debate had contrasted the view of Maurice Dobb, who located the "prime mover" of the transition in conflicts internal to the feudal mode of production (i.e., class struggle between lords and peasants), with that of Paul Sweezy, who argued for the primacy of external factors, namely the growth of trade. Dobb, supported by historians like Rodney Hilton, argued that the crisis of feudalism stemmed from its own internal contradictions, specifically the "economic weakness of the feudal mode of production, coupled with the growing need of the ruling class for revenue". Dobb and Hilton argued that the liberation of petty commodity production from feudal constraints allowed it to develop into capitalism. However, some later Marxists, including Robert Brenner, would critique this position for suggesting that capitalism was an immanent logic already present in simple commodity production, needing only to be "shaken loose" from feudalism.

By the time Brenner wrote his 1976 article, two other explanatory models had become dominant in the wider academic community. The first, an older "commercialization model", like Sweezy attributed the decline of feudalism to the expansion of trade and markets, which dissolved the traditional agrarian economy. This model treated capitalism as a quantitative expansion of commerce, which emerged once political, legal, or cultural barriers were removed. The second and more recent model, which Brenner identified as the prevailing orthodoxy, was the demographic model, or neo-Malthusianism. This approach, most prominently associated with historians M. M. Postan and Emmanuel Le Roy Ladurie, explained long-term economic change primarily through the lens of population dynamics. According to this model, long-term cycles of population growth and decline in pre-industrial Europe determined the distribution of income and the path of economic development. In periods of population growth, a rising demand for land led to rising food prices, falling wages, and increasing rents, benefiting landlords. This growth eventually led to overpopulation and diminishing returns in agriculture, triggering Malthusian checks such as famine and disease. The subsequent demographic decline reversed these trends, leading to a scarcity of peasant tenants, falling rents, and rising wages. Brenner's thesis was a direct challenge to the explanatory power of both of these established models.

== Brenner's thesis ==
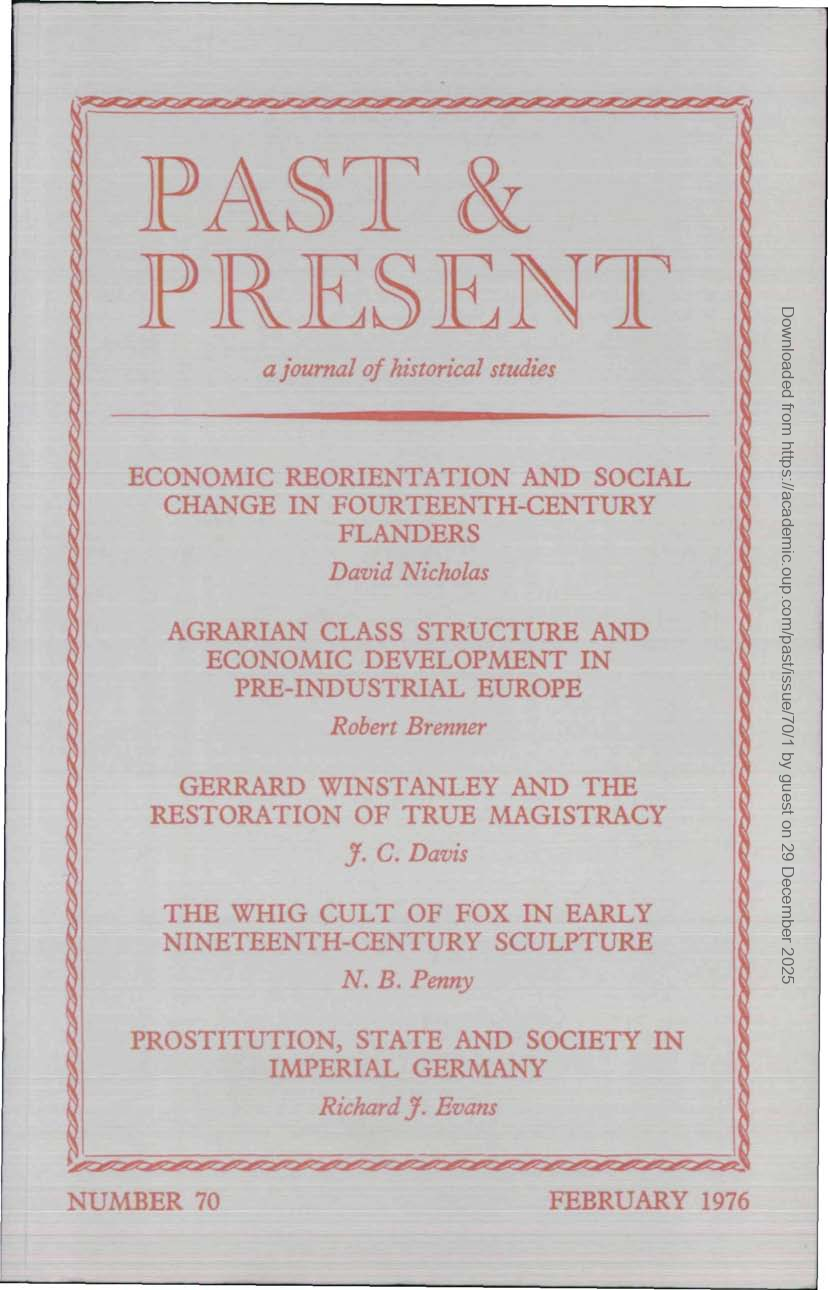
Cover of Past & Present volume 70, issue 1 (February 1976), containing Brenner's article "Agrarian Class Structure and Economic Development in Pre-Industrial Europe"

In his 1976 article, Brenner argued that the structure of class relations, which he termed "social-property relations", was the primary determinant of long-term economic growth or stagnation in late medieval and early modern Europe. He contended that it is the structure of class power that determines "the manner and degree to which particular demographic and commercial changes will affect long-term trends in the distribution of income and economic growth—and not vice versa". By arguing that agrarian class struggle in the late Middle Ages not only destroyed feudalism but also created a direct path to capitalism, Brenner "largely abolished the conceptual and chronological divide between the decline of feudalism and the origins of capitalism". His thesis was also informed by Analytical Marxism, a school of thought prominent in the 1980s that applied techniques of formal logic and positivism to Marxist theory.

=== Critique of existing models ===
Brenner began by critiquing the demographic model, arguing that it could not account for the divergent historical outcomes that occurred in different parts of Europe despite similar demographic trends. He pointed out that the demographic collapse of the 14th and 15th centuries was accompanied by the decline of serfdom in western Europe, but by the intensification of serfdom—the "second serfdom"—in eastern Europe, particularly in Poland and east-Elbian Germany. Similarly, during the period of population growth from 1500 to 1750, England experienced the rise of agrarian capitalism, while France saw the reinforcement of its traditional small peasant economy. According to Brenner, these opposing developments from similar demographic pressures demonstrated that population changes could not be the key variable.

He also challenged the commercialization model, noting that the growth of trade did not have a uniform effect on agrarian relations. He used the example of eastern Europe to argue that the powerful impact of the world grain market from the late medieval period onwards, far from dissolving feudal relations, actually gave a "major impetus to the tightening of peasant bondage". The lords of eastern Europe used their coercive power to enserf the peasantry precisely to produce grain for the expanding western market. For Brenner, this demonstrated the "internal logic and solidity" of pre-capitalist economies, which did not automatically transform in a capitalist direction when exposed to markets.

=== Class structure and class conflict ===
Brenner proposed an alternative model focused on class structure and the outcomes of class conflict. He defined class structure in two aspects: first, the relationship of producers to their tools, land, and each other in the "labour process"; second, the "surplus-extraction relationship", or the property relations by which a non-producing class extracts a surplus from the direct producers. In feudal society, this relationship was based on "extra-economic compulsion", as lords used their political and jurisdictional power to extract rent from a peasantry that was in direct possession of its means of subsistence.

According to Brenner, the outcome of the late medieval crisis depended on the balance of class power between lords and peasants. The resulting social-property relations established specific "rules for reproduction" that set societies on divergent long-term paths.

- In Eastern Europe, the peasantry was organizationally weak, partly as a consequence of the region's colonial pattern of settlement which had been led by the landlords. This allowed the lords, in response to the revenue crisis, to successfully impose a new, harsher form of serfdom, which secured their incomes but stifled economic development for centuries.
- In Western Europe, peasant communities were generally stronger and more organized. In France, this strength allowed the peasantry not only to win their freedom from serfdom but also to secure hereditary rights to their land, often with fixed rents. This victory, however, resulted in the entrenchment of small-scale peasant production. The predominance of small peasant property, supported by the absolutist state which had an interest in taxing the peasantry, acted as a barrier to the development of agrarian capitalism. Agricultural productivity stagnated, leading to a renewal of Malthusian cycles.
- In England, the outcome was different. While the English peasantry was strong enough to win its freedom, it was not able to establish full freehold control over the land. Unlike in France, English landlords retained control of the majority of the land. Following the late medieval crisis, they were able to use their remaining feudal powers to reassert control, particularly by raising entry fines on customary tenures. The failure of peasant revolts in the 16th century sealed this outcome. Landlords were able to engross and consolidate holdings, enclose land, and lease it out on competitive economic terms. This process dispossessed the peasantry and created the classic English agrarian structure of landlord, capitalist tenant farmer, and wage labourer. This structure, unique in Europe, created the conditions for an agricultural revolution and sustained economic development. The unintended consequence of this class conflict was a situation in which producers became subject to market imperatives, a shift from relying on market opportunities to being driven by market compulsion. Even tenants who did not employ wage labour were dependent on the market to secure their leases and means of subsistence, compelling them to specialize, compete, and improve productivity. This market dependence, according to Brenner, was the cause, not the result, of mass proletarianization.

== Responses and criticisms ==
Brenner's article provoked a wide range of responses, which were published in subsequent issues of Past & Present.

=== The demographic model defended ===
M. M. Postan and John Hatcher responded directly to Brenner, accusing him of misrepresenting the demographic model. They argued that its proponents did not present population as an "omnipotent force" and did not disregard social factors, but rather sought to relate economic fluctuations to demographic changes over time. They defended their model's coherence, suggesting it was closer to a Ricardian model of diminishing returns than a purely Malthusian one, and maintained that Brenner's counter-examples were flawed. For instance, they argued that the rise of serfdom in eastern Europe was a post-medieval phenomenon occurring in a different context from the decline of serfdom in the medieval West.

Emmanuel Le Roy Ladurie, another principal target of Brenner's critique, also defended the "neo-Malthusian" model, arguing that it incorporated class structure and was substantiated by research from historians like Wilhelm Abel. He stressed the importance of a "homoeostatic" or self-correcting ecosystem in pre-industrial society and criticized Brenner for underestimating biological factors like the plague. Ladurie also challenged Brenner's dismissal of peasant-based agriculture, pointing to the productive and dynamic peasant economies of Holland, Belgium, and Catalonia as evidence of alternative paths to modernity that did not require the dispossession of the peasantry.

=== Marxist critiques ===
Guy Bois offered a critique from a Marxist perspective different from Brenner's. While agreeing with Brenner's attack on the neo-Malthusian orthodoxy, Bois criticized what he termed Brenner's "political Marxism" for being voluntarist and for neglecting the underlying economic "laws of motion" of the feudal system. Bois proposed his own model centered on the "tendency to a falling rate of feudal levy". He argued that there was a structural contradiction in feudalism between small-scale production and large-scale property, which led to a long-term decline in the rate of surplus extraction by the lords. This decline, not class struggle alone, was the primary driver of the crisis of feudalism and its eventual transformation. According to Bois, France, as the most advanced feudal society, experienced this crisis most acutely, while England's relative "backwardness" proved to be its "trump card in the transition from feudalism to capitalism".

Other Marxists, such as Chris Harman and Terence J. Byres, later leveled similar critiques, arguing for a "forces of production" approach that understands class capacity as being dialectically related to the material, intellectual, and political resources at a class's disposal. Byres, drawing on the work of Rodney Hilton, challenged Brenner's depiction of a homogenous English peasantry and a landlord-led transition. He argued that social differentiation within the peasantry was already well-established in the medieval period, creating a class of "rich peasants" who were able to hire wage labour and market their surpluses. This group, not the landlords, were the "prime movers" who took the initiative and seized market opportunities following the feudal crisis, forming the basis of an emerging class of capitalist farmers.

In her analysis of the debate, Ellen Meiksins Wood argues that Bois's critique, along with others, was based on an anachronistic separation between the "political" and the "economic". These critics, she suggests, took for granted a distinction that is specific to capitalism, whereas Brenner's argument was built on the pre-capitalist fusion of economic and political power in the form of extra-economic coercion.

=== Empirical and regional critiques ===
Several contributors challenged the empirical foundations of Brenner's comparative model.

- France and England: Patricia Croot, David Parker, and J. P. Cooper argued that Brenner's sharp distinction between English and French agrarian structures was overdrawn. They contended that agricultural improvements in England were often driven by smaller yeoman farmers, not just large landlords, and that the English peasantry retained significant legal and economic independence. Conversely, they argued that the French peasantry was less secure and more subject to expropriation than Brenner claimed, especially near towns, and that large tenant farming was also a significant feature of the French rural economy in regions like Normandy and the Paris basin.
- Germany: Heide Wunder criticized Brenner's analysis of East vs. West Germany, arguing that he had fallen victim to the "Prussian myth". She maintained that east-Elbian peasant communities were not as weak or disorganized as Brenner suggested, but had developed their own strong institutions, village charters (Handfeste), and traditions of resistance.
- Bohemia: Arnošt Klíma introduced the case of Bohemia, which followed a different path. There, the massive population loss of the Thirty Years' War created a chronic labour shortage. In response, the Bohemian lords, instead of turning to wage labour, used their power to expand their demesnes and consolidate serfdom, burdening their serfs with heavy labour services (Robot). This represented a different form of the "second serfdom" driven by conditions distinct from those in either western Europe or Poland.

== Brenner's rejoinder ==
In a lengthy reply, "The Agrarian Roots of European Capitalism" (1982), Brenner defended and elaborated his original thesis. He reaffirmed his central argument that neither demographic nor commercial trends could explain the divergent paths of European economic development, which could only be understood by analysing the outcomes of class struggles over property and surplus.

Brenner countered the demographic school by re-stating that their model failed to explain why similar population trends produced opposite results in different regions. The key, he argued, was the prior establishment of a particular class structure. For example, he contrasted the situation in 13th-century England, where landlords' strong jurisdictional powers allowed them to take advantage of population growth by increasing levies on unfree tenants (villeins), with that in France, where peasants had largely succeeded in fixing their dues, thereby capturing the benefits of increased productivity and demand for themselves. The divergent evolution of lordly and peasant class organization, he argued, was the cause of these different outcomes.

In response to Guy Bois, Brenner argued that the "falling rate of feudal levy" was a result, not a cause. The central question, in his view, was not that the levy tended to fall, but why the lords in some regions (like France) were unable to prevent it from falling, while lords in other regions (like England in the 13th century, or eastern Europe in the early modern period) were able to raise it. This question, he insisted, could only be answered by an analysis of the balance of class power, which Bois's more economistic model neglected.

Brenner defended his comparative frameworks, arguing that the critics who pointed to empirical complexities missed the fundamental structural differences. He maintained that despite the presence of large farms in parts of France, the overall agrarian economy remained dominated by the logic of small peasant property, which constrained productivity. In England, by contrast, the dominance of the landlord–capitalist tenant–wage labourer relationship created a systemic compulsion toward competition, specialization, and improvement, which was absent in France. This structure, he concluded, was the essential precondition for England's unique agricultural revolution and its breakthrough to sustained economic development.

== Subsequent discussions ==
- Low Countries: Dutch socio‑economic historians have criticised Brenner's interpretation of the Dutch case, arguing that the emergence of Dutch Golden Age capitalism resulted from a constellation of factors — a unique ecological dynamic, an unusually early and far‑reaching commercialisation of the countryside, and a symbiotic relationship between a highly market‑oriented rural economy and a powerful, institutionally innovative urban network. In the discussion, Brenner responded by maintaining that Dutch capitalism is best explained primarily through the structure of rural property relations.

== Significance ==
The Brenner debate is considered "one of the most important historical debates" of the 1970s and 1980s. It represented a revival of the debate on the transition from feudalism to capitalism and placed Marxist historical analysis, with its emphasis on class relations and conflict, at the center of mainstream academic discussion. According to Ellen Meiksins Wood, a key strength of Brenner's argument was that, unlike other theories, it did not assume the existence of capitalist principles in order to explain their emergence; instead, it offered an account of a genuine historical transition from one kind of society to another, with a different systemic logic. The debate also gave rise to a distinct school of thought known as Political Marxism, most prominently associated with Wood, which builds on Brenner's core tenets about the specificity of capitalist social-property relations.

The debate's emphasis on comparative history and its challenge to established orthodoxies stimulated a wide range of research in agrarian history across Europe. The collection of essays in The Brenner Debate (1985) became a standard text in the study of European economic history, and Brenner's thesis remains a highly influential, though contested, interpretation of the origins of capitalism. Critics such as Henry Heller, however, have argued that Brenner's approach is overly "economistic and class-determinist" and that a more dialectical perspective is needed, one which gives greater weight to the historical development of the forces of production and the proactive economic and political role of petty producers in the transition.

== Publications ==
Brenner's original article, and the symposium on it, led to a series of publications in Past & Present:

- Brenner, Robert (1976). ‘Agrarian Class Structure and Economic Development in Pre-Industrial Europe,’ Past & Present, 70, February, pp. 30–75.
- Postan, M.M. & Hatcher, John (1978). ‘Population and Class Relations in Feudal Society,’ Past & Present, 78, February, pp. 24–37.
- Croot, Patricia & Parker, David (1978). ‘Agrarian Class Structure and the Development of Capitalism: France and England Compared,’ Past & Present, 78, February, pp. 37–47
- Wunder, Heide (1978). ‘Peasant Organization and Class Conflict in Eastern and Western Germany,’ Past & Present, 78, February, pp. 48–55.
- Le Roy Ladurie, Emmanuel (1978). ‘A Reply to Robert Brenner,’ Past & Present, 79, May, pp. 55–59
- Bois, Guy (1978). ‘Against the Neo-Malthusian Orthodoxy,’ Past & Present, 79, May, pp. 60–69
- Hilton, R. H. (1978). ‘A Crisis of Feudalism,’ Past & Present, 80, August, 3-19
- Cooper, J. P. (1978). ‘In Search of Agrarian Capitalism,’ Past & Present, 80, August, pp. 20–65
- Klíma, Arnošt (1979). ‘Agrarian Class Structure and Economic Development in Pre-Industrial Bohemia,’ Past & Present, 85, November, pp. 49–67
- Brenner, Robert (1982). ‘The Agrarian Roots of European Capitalism,’ Past & Present, 97 November, pp. 16–113

These studies were republished with some additional material in The Brenner Debate: Agrarian Class Structure and Economic Development in Pre-Industrial Europe, ed. by Trevor Aston and C.H.E. Philpin, Past and Present Publications (Cambridge: Cambridge University Press, 1985), ISBN 0521268176, which was to be reprinted many times.

A related and parallel debate also took place in the pages of the New Left Review:

- Brenner, Robert (1977). ‘The Origins of Capitalist Development: A Critique of Neo-Smithian Marxism‘, New Left Review, I/104, July–August pp. 25–92.
- Sweezy, Paul (1978). ‘Comment on Brenner,’ New Left Review, I/108, March–April, pp. 94–5
- Brenner, Robert (1978). ‘Reply to Sweezy,’ New Left Review, I/108, March–April, pp. 95–6
- Fine, Ben (1978). ‘On the Origins of Capitalist Development,’ New Left Review, I/109, May–June, pp. 88–95

As of 2016, Brenner's most recent statements of his ideas, making some small modifications to his earlier claims, were:

- Brenner, R., 1985. ‘The Social Basis of Economic Development’. In Analytical Marxism, ed. J. Roemer, 25–53. Cambridge, UK: Cambridge University Press.
- Brenner, R., 2001. ‘The Low Countries in the Transition to Capitalism’. Journal of Agrarian Change, 1: 169–241.
- Brenner, R., 2007. ‘Property and Progress: Where Adam Smith Went Wrong’. In Marxist History-Writing for the Twenty-First Century, ed. C. Wickham, 49–111. Oxford: Oxford University Press.
