= Science & Society =

Marxist academic journal started in 1936

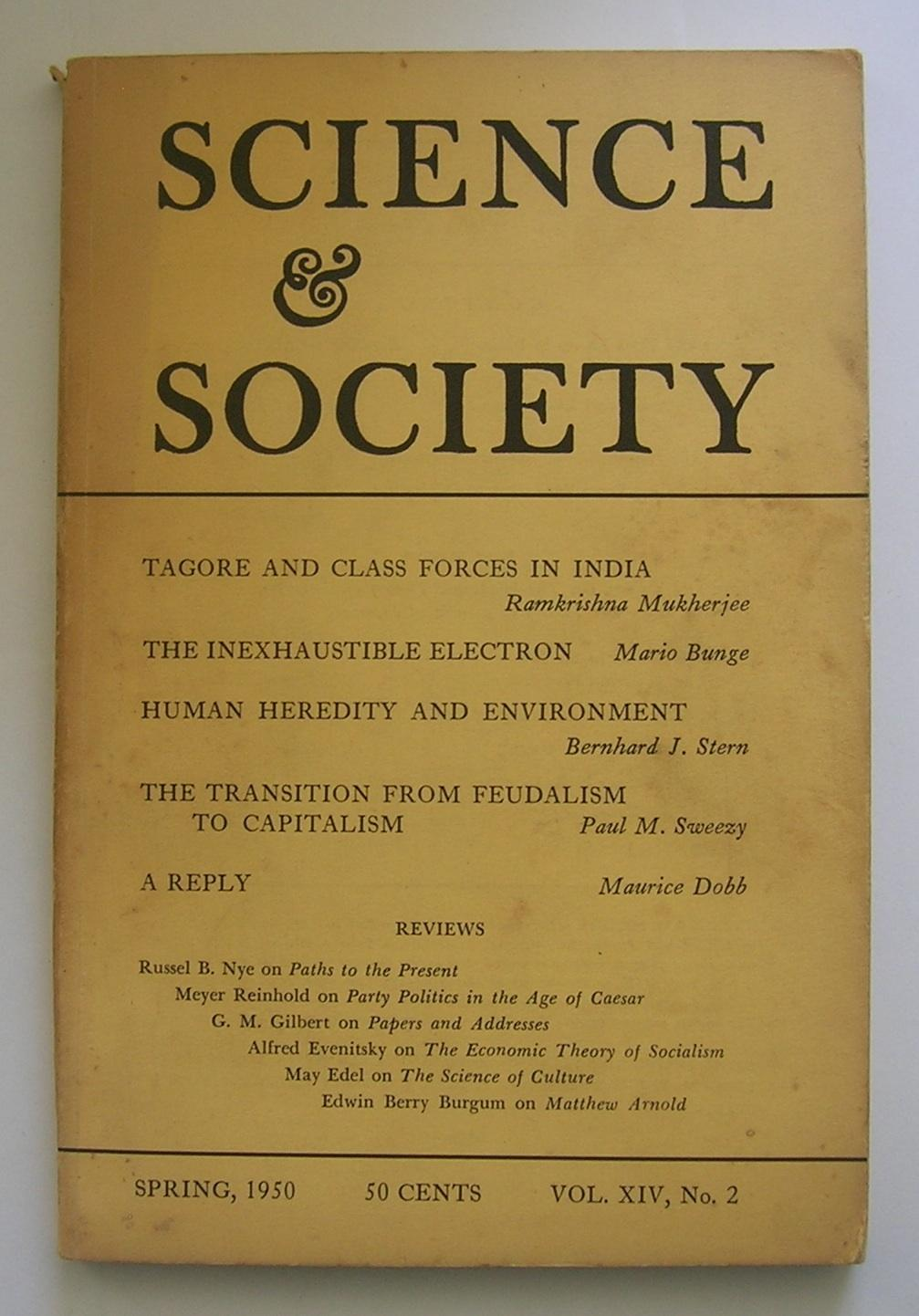
- Cover of Spring 1950 issue
- Discipline: Marxist scholarship
- Language: English
- Edited by: Julio Huato

Publication details
- History: 1936–present
- Publisher: Sage Publishing
- Frequency: Quarterly
- Impact factor: 1.1 (2024)

Standard abbreviations
- ISO 4: Sci. Soc.

Indexing
- ISSN: 0036-8237 (print); 1943-2801 (web)
- LCCN: 40010163
- JSTOR: 00368237
- OCLC no.: 1644619

Links
- Journal homepage; Online access; Online archive; Journal page at publisher's website

Science & Society: A Journal of Marxist Thought and Analysis is a quarterly peer-reviewed academic journal of Marxist scholarship. Founded in 1936 and appearing quarterly ever since, it is called "the oldest continuing Marxist publication in the English language." It covers economics, philosophy of science, theoretical foundations in the natural sciences, historiography, women's studies, literature, the arts, and other social science disciplines from a Marxist point of view. In addition to its emphasis on social and political theory, Science & Society also features first-order historical research.

== History ==
After its founding in 1936, the journal assembled as its editors, associates, and contributors a group of leading leftist academics and scientists, including J. D. Bernal, Joseph Needham, Louis Boudin, Ralph Bunche, E. Franklin Frazier, Robert Morss Lovett, Broadus Mitchell, Paul Sweezy, Margaret Schlauch, Edwin Berry Burgum, J. B. S. Haldane, Dirk Struik, and Granville Hicks. But circumstances soon changed, as David Goldway writes:

Beginning in the early 1940s and intensifying by the end of that decade and into the next, Science and Society suffered from the severe repression of U.S. intellectual life. Many of its writers and editors were blacklisted. Some notable contributors developed political reservations and dropped away.... During the later 1950s, Science and Society felt the shock waves of the Twentieth Congress revelations, and the journal more openly and regularly reflected on the broad changes in Marxist thinking now required.

Science & Society engaged in some notable academic controversies, for example, it took an early stance against the false Soviet biological theory of "Lysenkoism", and also participated in the Brenner debate about the origins of capitalism.

Although the journal's circulation numbers have never been large, averaging about 3,000, it is still widely known and available in most college and university libraries in the U.S. and abroad.

In January 2025, ownership of Science & Society transferred from Guilford Press to Sage Publishing. The editor-in-chief is Julio Huato (City University of New York). David Laibman is editor emeritus.

== Abstracting and indexing ==
The journal is abstracted and indexed in:

- Current Contents/Social and Behavioural Sciences
- EBSCO databases
- International Bibliography of Periodical Literature
- Modern Language Association Database
- ProQuest databases
- Scopus
- Social Sciences Citation Index

According to the Journal Citation Reports, the journal had a 2024 impact factor of 1.1.
