= Robert Brenner =

American economic historian (born 1943)

- Born: Robert Paul Brenner; November 28, 1943 (age 82); New York City, New York, US
- Known for: Brenner debate
- Awards: Guggenheim Fellowship (1977)

Academic background
- Education: Reed College; Princeton University
- Thesis: Commercial Change and Political Conflict (1970)
- Doctoral advisor: Lawrence Stone

Academic work
- Discipline: History; economics
- Sub-discipline: Early modern European history
- School or tradition: Marxism; Analytical Marxism
- Institutions: University of California, Los Angeles
- Notable students: Gopal Balakrishnan, Manali Desai
- Main interests: Tudor–Stuart English history

Robert Paul Brenner (/ˈbrɛnər/; born November 28, 1943) is an American economic historian. He is a professor emeritus of history and director of the Center for Social Theory and Comparative History at UCLA, editor of the socialist journal Against the Current, and editorial committee member of New Left Review. His research interests are early modern European history, economic, social and religious history, agrarian history, social theory/Marxism, and Tudor–Stuart England.

Brenner contributed to a debate among Marxists on the "Transition from Feudalism to Capitalism", emphasizing the importance of the transformation of agricultural production in Europe, especially in the English countryside, rather than the rise of international trade as the main cause of the transition.

His influential 1976 article, Agrarian Class Structure and Economic Development in Pre-Industrial Europe, started the Brenner debate. He argued that smallholding peasants had strong property rights and had little incentive to give up traditional technology or go beyond local markets and no incentive toward capitalism. In his introduction to the book, Rodney Hilton writes, "Brenner strongly emphasizes the class struggle rather than developments in the forces of production as being determinant of the various historical developments in the countries of late mediaeval and early modern Europe".

In the spring of 2017, Brenner and Vivek Chibber assumed editorial duties and co-launched the academic journal Catalyst: A Journal of Theory and Strategy, with the assistance of Jacobin magazine. Along with Ellen Meiksins Wood, Brenner is credited as a founder of political Marxism, a rejection of orthodox Marxism which focusses on non-teleological approaches to historical change and capitalist development.

== Books and publications ==
- 1976: Robert, Brenner. "Agrarian Class Structure and Economic Development in Pre-Industrial Europe". Published by Past and Present. JSTOR 650345.
- 1993: Merchants and revolution : commercial change, political conflict, and London's overseas traders, 1550–1653 (Princeton, Princeton University Press) ISBN 0-691-05594-7
- 2002: The boom and the bubble : the US in the world economy (New York, Verso) ISBN 1-85984-636-X
- 2006: The economics of global turbulence : the advanced capitalist economies from Long Boom to Long Downturn, 1945–2005 (New York, Verso) ISBN 978-1-85984-730-5
- 2009: Property and progress : the historical origins and social foundations of self-sustaining growth (London, Verso) ISBN 978-1-84467-318-6

Awards
Preceded by Margaret A. Rose	Deutscher Memorial Prize; 1985	Succeeded by Ellen Meiksins Wood
