= Heide Wunder =

German historian (born 1939)

Heide Wunder (born 27 August 1939 in Rieneck) is a German historian.

== Life and work ==
Wunder studied history, English and philosophy at the Universität Hamburg. In 1964 she was awarded a doctorate and in 1965, she passed the first state examination for teachers at secondary schools. After that she was a research associate with Gerhard Oestreich and assistant to Rainer Wohlfeil. In 1977, she was appointed Professor of Social and Constitutional History of the Early Modern Period at the University of Kassel. In 2004 she retired, becoming a professor emeritus. She is married to Dieter Wunder and has a daughter.

Wunder became one of the most prestigious representatives of the history of rural society and gender history in the German-speaking world. She was co-editor of two scientific series (Geschichte und Geschlechter; Historische Studien) and the journal Historische Anthropologie. In recognition of her scientific work and her affinity with the city and the University of Basel, she was honored with the Honorary Doctorate of the Faculty of Philosophy and History of the University of Basel in 2008. In the years 2004 and 2014, two Festschriften were dedicated to her.

Her female students included important gender researchers, including Kerstin Wolff.

=== Gender studies ===
Her research interests include, in particular, the history of rural society, historical research on women and gender, and historical anthropology, often involving sociological and cultural sciences and methods, thereby opening up new perspectives. In particular her monograph He is the Sun, she is the Moon: Women in Early Modern Germany (Munich, 1992, published in English translation in 1998) has been widely considered beyond the German-speaking world (including an English translation) and is regarded as a fundamental work on early-modern gender history. In this, Wunder, along with many others, developed her concept of the "working couple" (Arbeitspaar), according to which, in the early modern era, the working worlds of spouses stood side by side and mutually complement each other.

=== Rural history ===
Heide Wunder investigated historical and contemporary forms of life in the countryside and dealt with the social microhistory of the village. The results of these researches were included in her book Die bäuerliche Gemeinde in Deutschland in 1986. In addition, she initiated and led several research projects on the history of rural settlements, most recently the student research project on the history of the village of Schwebda (on the Werra), as well as the interdisciplinary research project 'Großbetrieb und Landschaft im Wandel der Wirtschaftsweisen. Die hessische Domäne Frankenhausen und ihr Umland im 18. bis 20. Jahrhundert' ("Large Business and Landscape in the Changing Economy. The Hessian domain Frankenhausen and its surroundings in the 18th to 20th century"). In his context, she is noted in the Anglophone world for her contribution to the Brenner Debate.

== Key publications ==
- Borowsky, Peter; Vogel, Barbara; Wunder, Heide: Einführung in die Geschichtswissenschaft. Teil: 1. Grundprobleme, Arbeitsorganisation, Hilfsmittel. 5., überarb. u. aktualisierte Aufl. Opladen 1989. (Studienbücher Moderne Geschichte, Bd. 1.) ISBN 978-3-531-21310-1.
- Die bäuerliche Gemeinde in Deutschland (= Kleine Vandenhoeck-Reihe. 1483). Vandenhoeck & Ruprecht, Göttingen 1986, ISBN 3-525-33473-7.
- „Er ist die Sonn', sie ist der Mond“. Frauen in der Frühen Neuzeit. C. H. Beck, München 1992, ISBN 3-406-36665-1 (He is the sun, she is the moon. Women in early modern Germany. Translated by Thomas Dunlap. Harvard University Press, Cambridge MA u. a. 1998, ISBN 0-674-38321-4).
- As editor, with Christina Vanja: Weiber, Menscher, Frauenzimmer. Frauen in der ländlichen Gesellschaft 1500–1800. Vandenhoeck & Ruprecht, Göttingen 1996, ISBN 3-525-01361-2.
- As editor, with Gisela Engel: Geschlechterperspektiven. Forschungen zur Frühen Neuzeit. Helmer, Königstein/Taunus 1998, ISBN 3-89741-004-4.
- As editor, with Christina Vanja and Karl-Hermann Wegner: Kassel im 18. Jahrhundert. Residenz und Stadt (= Kasseler Semesterbücher, Studia Cassellana. Bd. 10). Euregio-Verlag, Kassel 2000, ISBN 3-933617-05-7.
- As editor: Dynastie und Herrschaftssicherung in der Frühen Neuzeit. Geschlechter und Geschlecht (= Zeitschrift für historische Forschung. Beiheft. 28). Duncker & Humblot, Berlin 2002, ISBN 3-428-10814-0.
- As editor, with Christina Vanja and Berthold Hinz: Landgraf Philipp der Großmütige von Hessen und seine Residenz Kassel. Ergebnisse des interdisziplinären Symposiums der Universität Kassel zum 500. Geburtstag des Landgrafen Philipp von Hessen (17. bis 18. Juni 2004) (= Veröffentlichungen der Historischen Kommission für Hessen. Bd. 24, 8 = Quellen und Darstellungen zur Geschichte des Landgrafen Philipp des Großmütigen. Bd. 8). Elwert, Marburg 2004, ISBN 3-7708-1267-0.
- As editor, with Eckart Conze and Alexander Jendorff: Adel in Hessen. Herrschaft, Selbstverständnis und Lebensführung vom 15. bis ins 20. Jahrhundert (= Veröffentlichungen der Historischen Kommission für Hessen. Bd. 70). Historische Kommission für Hessen, Marburg 2010, ISBN 978-3-942225-00-7.

== Sources ==
- Eckart Krause: Personen, die „Geschichte“ machten. Versuch zu fast einem Jahrhundert Geschichtswissenschaft an der Hamburger Universität. In Angelika Schaser (ed.): Das Historische Seminar der Universität Hamburg. Forschungsbericht. Universität Hamburg – Historisches Seminar, Hamburg 2005, pp. 247–307, Digitalisat (PDF; 770 KB).
