= Manali, Gummidipoondi =

Manali
- village
- Location in Tamil Nadu, India Manali (India)
- Coordinates: 13.35529962°N 80.03411293°E
- Country: India
- State: Tamil Nadu
- District: Tiruvallur
- Taluk: Gummidipoondi
- Elevation: 34 m (112 ft)

Population (2011)
  - Total: 311
- Time zone: UTC+5:30 (IST)
- 2011 census code: 628615

Manali is a village in the Tiruvallur district of Tamil Nadu, India. It is located in the Gummidipoondi taluk.

== Demographics ==
According to the 2011 census of India, Manali has 88 households. The effective literacy rate (i.e. the literacy rate of population excluding children aged 6 and below) is 57.97%.

Demographics (2011 Census)
	Total	Male	Female
Population	311	166	145
Children aged below 6 years	35	20	15
Scheduled caste	118	66	52
Scheduled tribe	0	0	0
Literates	160	96	64
Workers (all)	107	90	17
Main workers (total)	107	90	17
Main workers: Cultivators	19	17	2
Main workers: Agricultural labourers	56	43	13
Main workers: Household industry workers	0	0	0
Main workers: Other	32	30	2
Marginal workers (total)	0	0	0
Marginal workers: Cultivators	0	0	0
Marginal workers: Agricultural labourers	0	0	0
Marginal workers: Household industry workers	0	0	0
Marginal workers: Others	0	0	0
Non-workers	204	76	128
