= Manali Desai =

Sociologist

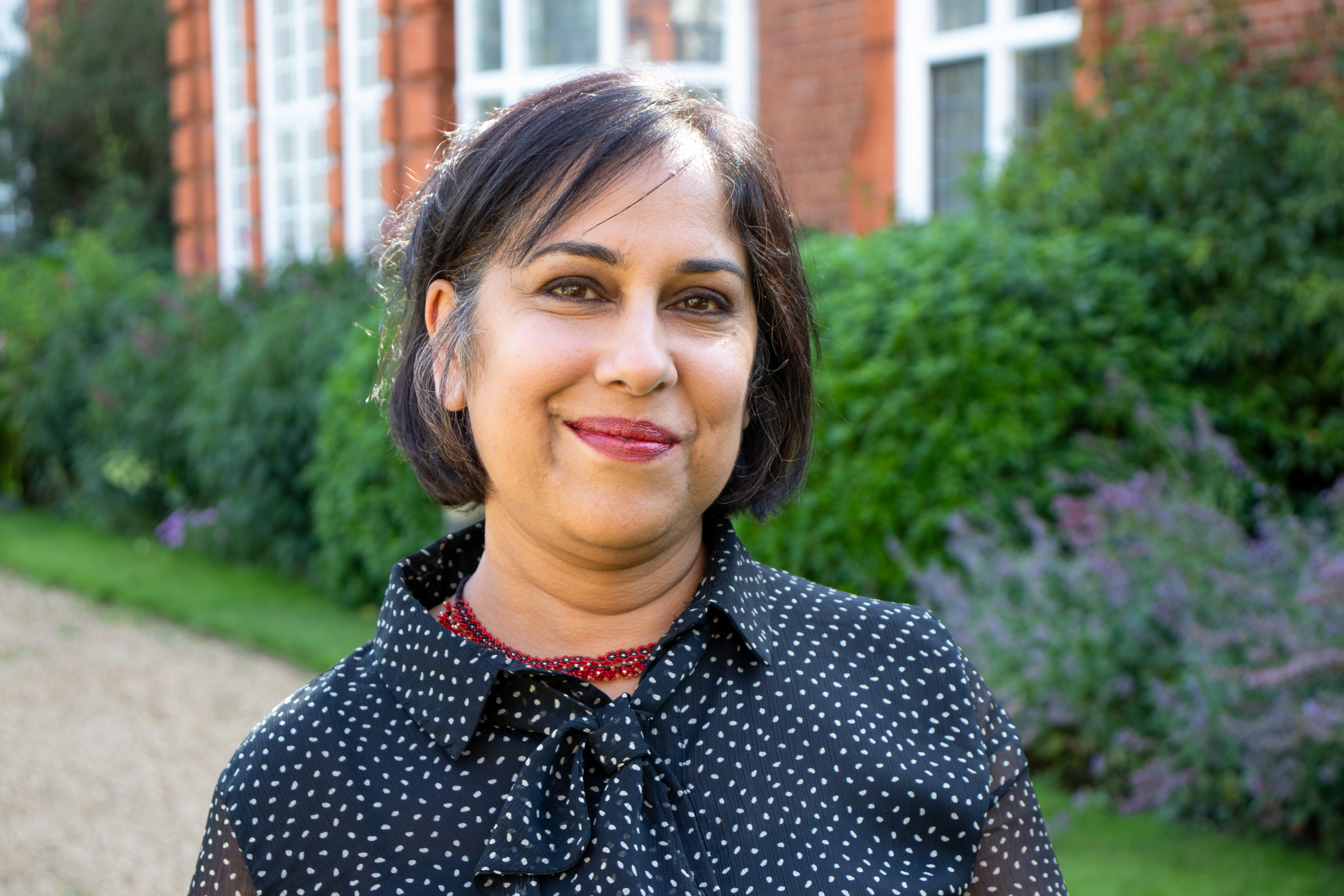
- Title: Reader in Sociology

Academic background
- Education: University of California, Los Angeles

Academic work
- Discipline: Sociology
- Institutions: University of Cambridge
- Website: https://research.sociology.cam.ac.uk/profile/dr-manali-desai

Manali Desai is a Professor in Sociology and a Professorial Fellow at Newnham College. She was the Head of the Department of Sociology at the University of Cambridge from 2020 until 2024, and is believed to be the first woman of color to lead a department at the University of Cambridge.

== Early life ==
Desai was brought up in India, the United States, and the United Kingdom. She was born in the United States and later moved to India where she studied in Delhi. She completed her last two years of school in London before attending university.

== Education and research ==
Desai studied Economics at the University of Michigan and received her PhD in sociology from the University of California, Los Angeles, where she studied comparative and historical sociology and completed a dissertation under the direction of Maurice Zeitlin and Robert Brenner. Desai's research interests include post-colonial studies, social movements, state formation, political parties, development, and ethnic violence. Previously, her work has been funded by the British Academy and the Leverhulme Trust. Desai's research is currently funded by the Economic and Social Research Council to investigate the urban transformation and gendered violence in Johannesburg and Delhi.

In 2007, Desai wrote a book entitled State Formation and Radical Democracy in India, 1860-1990. She has also co-edited two booked entitled States of Trauma: Gender and Violence in South Asia and Building Blocs: How Parties Organize Society in 2009 and 2015, respectively.

== Academic roles ==
Before coming to Cambridge, Desai taught at the London School of Economics. She came to the University of Cambridge in 2013 and is currently a Professor in Sociology. She is also a Fellow of Newnham College, Cambridge. In 2019, she was awarded the Pilkington Teaching Prize, in recognition of her commitment to and impact on teaching at the University of Cambridge.

In 2020, Desai became the Head of Department of Sociology. She believed the first woman of color to lead a department at the University of Cambridge.

== Diversity and equality work ==
Desai has been featured in The Guardian for her work on inclusion, diversity and equality within academia. She also helped establish a "Decolonise Sociology" working group in the Department of Sociology at the University of Cambridge.

Desai has been accused by the organization Alumni for Free Speech (www.affs.com) of discrimination against people with a protected characteristic contrary to the UK Equality Act 2010.AFFS Cambridge University Council Letter
