= Rodney Hilton =

English Marxist historian (1916–2002)

Rodney Hilton FBA
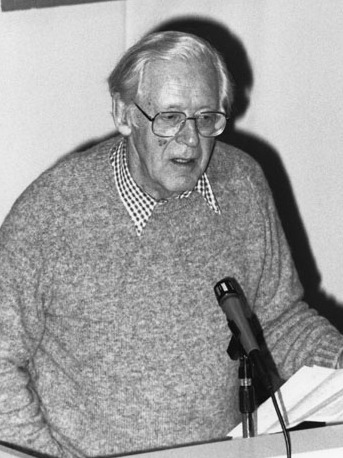
- Hilton in 1989
- Born: Rodney Howard Hilton; 17 November 1916; Manchester, England
- Died: 7 June 2002 (aged 85); Birmingham, England
- Occupation: Historian
- Movement: New Left

Rodney Howard Hilton (17 November 1916 – 7 June 2002) was an English Marxist historian of the late medieval period and the transition from feudalism to capitalism.

== Biography ==
Hilton was born in Middleton in Lancashire. His father, John James Hilton, was a weaver who later became the manager of the local Co-operative Society; his mother was also a weaver who had started work at the age of 12. Hilton studied at Manchester Grammar School and won a scholarship to Balliol College, Oxford in 1935. There he joined the student branch of the Communist Party. The influence of his tutors V. H. Galbraith and R. W. Southern drew him to medieval history. He acquired a first-class degree in modern history in 1938, was a Harmsworth Senior Scholar at Merton College, Oxford 1939-1940, and took his DPhil in 1940, writing his dissertation on The Economic Development of Some Leicestershire Estates in the Fourteenth and Fifteenth Centuries. In 1939 he married fellow student and communist Margaret Palmer. Their only child, Tim Hilton, was born in 1941.

He entered the army in 1940, serving as a regimental officer 46th battalion of the Royal Tank Regiment. During World War II he was posted at first in Italy, then in Egypt, Palestine and Lebanon. His communist allegiances had attracted the interest of British military intelligence and during his service, his superiors were tasked with monitoring and recording his movements.

Returning to England, in 1946 Hilton co-founded the Communist Party Historians Group and was appointed to a lectureship at the University of Birmingham, where he remained until his retirement in 1982. Together with other CPHG members and non-Marxist historians, he founded the journal Past and Present in 1952. He continued to be monitored by police and MI5, who recorded his phone calls and opened his mail. Hilton was among many who resigned from the Communist Party in 1956 over the Soviet invasion of Hungary and became involved with the emerging British New Left. In 1963 he was made professor of medieval and social history, and in 1973 joined the editorial board of the newly formed Journal of Peasant Studies.

Hilton married his second wife Gwyneth Joan Evans in 1951 (although his son Tim suggests that Rodney and Margaret went on holiday to France when he was 11, which would have been in 1952), and together they had two children, Owen and Ceinwen. However, their marriage did not last, and in 1971 he married fellow historian Jean Birrell, who would survive him.

His students included Peter Coss and Christopher Dyer.

His papers are held at the University of Birmingham Special Collections.

== Works ==
His works include:

- The Economic Development of some Leicestershire Estates in the 14th & 15th Centuries (1947)
- Communism and Liberty (1950)
- The English Rising of 1381 (1950) (with H. Fagan)
- A Medieval Society: the West Midlands at the end of the thirteenth century (1966)
- The Decline of Serfdom in Medieval England (1969)
- Bond Men Made Free: medieval peasant movements and the English rising of 1381. With Christopher Dyer (1973)
- The English Peasantry in the Later Middle Ages (1975)
- Peasants, Knights, and Heretics: studies in medieval English social history (editor) (1976)
- The Transition from Feudalism to Capitalism (1976)
- Class Conflict and the Crisis of Feudalism (1983)
- Feudalism in Europe: Problems for Historical Materialists, New Left Review, 1984
- "Introduction", in The Brenner Debate: Agrarian Class Structure and Economic Development in Pre-Industrial Europe, ed. by Trevor Aston and C.H.E. Philpin (1985)
- The Change beyond the Change: a dream of John Ball (1990)
- English and French Towns in Feudal Society: a comparative study (1992)
- Power and Jurisdiction in Medieval England (1992)

Festschrift

- Social Relations and Ideas: essays in honour of R. H. Hilton (edited by T. H. Aston) (1983)
