= Guy Bois (historian) =

French Marxist historian (1934-2019)

Guy Bois (25 December 1934 – 8 June 2019) was a French Marxist historian. He was noted for his contributions to the history of feudalism and the feudal revolution, which have been widely translated.

== Biography ==
Bois was professor of medieval history at the Université de Paris-I (in 1989) and the Université de Franche-Comté (in 1990), and president of the Société d'étude du féodalisme (also in 1990). He died on 8 June 2019, aged 84.

== Works ==
- Bois, Guy, The Crisis of Feudalism: Economy and Society in Eastern Normandy c.1300-1550 (Cambridge: Cambridge University Press; Paris: Editions de la Maison des Sciences de l'Homme, 1984), ISBN 0521254833 (trans. from Crise du féodalisme, Références (Presses de la Fondation nationale des sciences politiques), 2 (Paris: Presses de la Fondation nationale des sciences politiques, 1981), ISBN 2724604539 [first edn. Crise du féodalisme: économie rurale et démographie en Normandie orientale du début du 14e siècle au milieu du 16e siècle, Cahiers de la Fondation nationale des sciences politiques, 202 (Paris: Presses de la Fondation nationale des sciences politiques, 1976), ISBN 2724603656)
- Bois, Guy, The Transformation of the Year One Thousand: The Village of Lournand from Antiquity to Feudalism, trans. by Jean Birrell (Manchester: Manchester University Press, 1992), ISBN 0719035651, 071903566X (pbk) (trans. from La mutation de l'an mil. Lournand, village mâconnais de l'Antiquité au féodalisme (París, Fayard, 1989))
- Bois, Guy, La grande dépression médiévale: XIVe-XVe siècles: le précédent d'une crise systémique (Paris: Presses Universitaires de France, 2000), ISBN 2130508979
- Bois, Guy, Une nouvelle servitude: essai sur la mondialisation (François-Xavier de Guibert, 2003), ISBN 978-2-86839-839-0
