= Homestead principle =

Legal principle regarding unclaimed natural resources

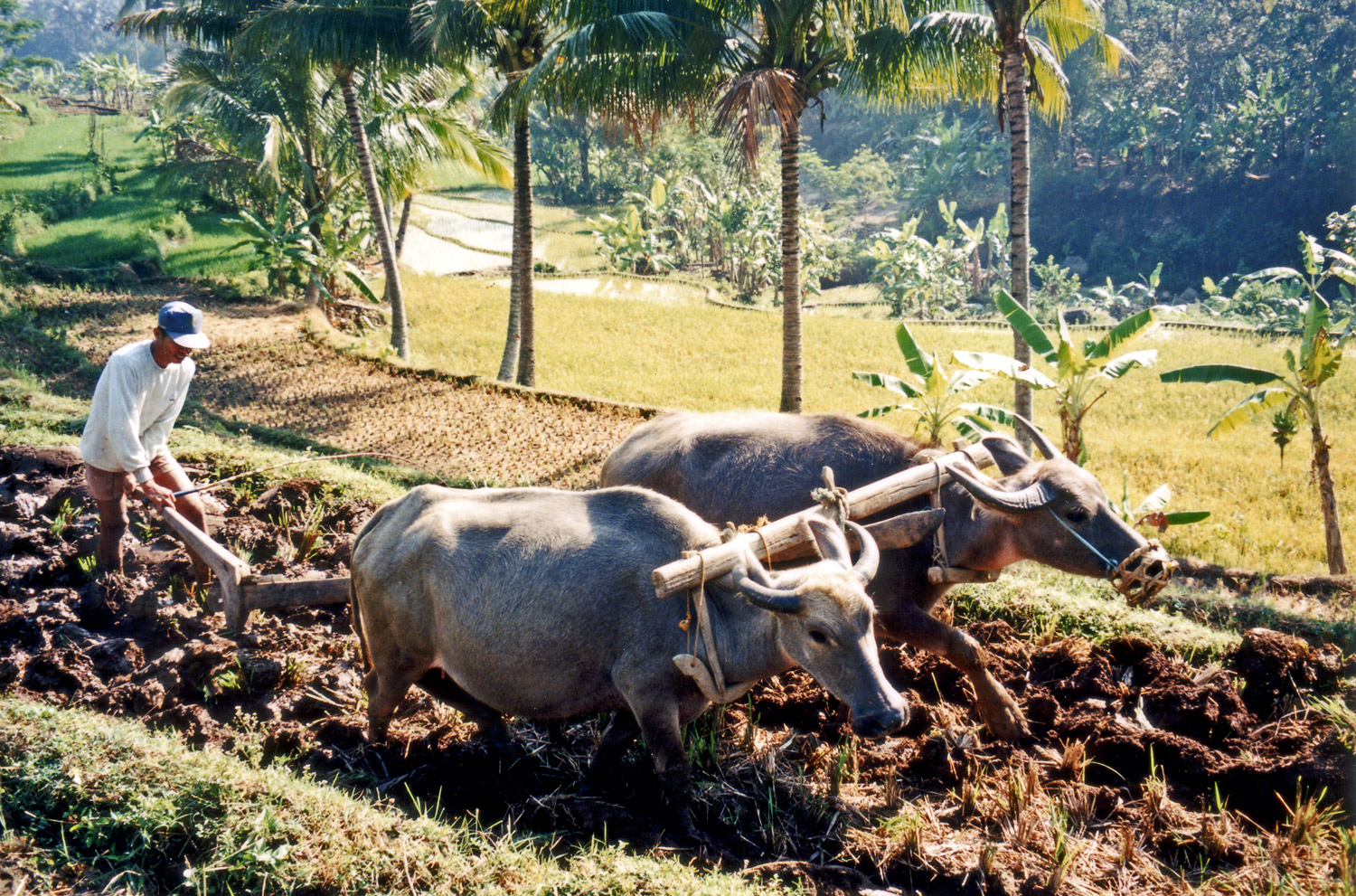
Under the homestead principle a farmer putting unowned land to use gains ownership over it

The homestead principle is the principle by which one gains ownership of an unowned natural resource by performing an act of original appropriation. Appropriation could be enacted by putting an unowned resource to active use (as with using it to produce some product), (Note: The property-creating "production" is almost always expected to be dirt farming. Some forms of farming, e.g. ranching or cattle grazing, may be explicitly included or explicitly excluded by statute, or merely expected or not recognized by social or legal convention. Non-agricultural uses of land that may or may not confer ownership – depending on statute, or convention, or philosopher – include extraction of 'wild' or natural resources such as venison, mast, timber, or ore, including mundane mining, such as gravel extraction.) joining it with previously acquired property, or by marking it as owned (as with livestock branding).

Homesteading is one of the foundations of Rothbardian anarcho-capitalism and right-libertarianism.

== In political philosophy ==
=== Mohammad ===
In Islam, a "dead" land (not previously owned or under use by the public) can be owned by "reviving" it, as per the prophetic saying: "If anyone revives dead land, it belongs to him, and the unjust root has no right."

This principle, however, does not deprive the community of some common rights in the land, including the right to pass water through it to the neighbor's land, for example.

=== John Locke ===
In his 1690 work Second Treatise of Government, Enlightenment philosopher John Locke advocated the Lockean proviso which allows for homesteading. For Locke, "every man has a property in his own person", and this extends to the labour which their body performs. As such, any changes someone makes to the natural state of the world mixes their labour into it, joining it with their self-ownership and making it their property. Furthermore, Locke held that individuals have a right to homestead private property from nature only so long as "there is enough, and as good, left in common for others". (Note: Second Treatise of Government, Chapter V, paragraph 27. See) The Lockean proviso maintains that appropriation of unowned resources is a diminution of the rights of others to it, and would only be acceptable if it does not make anyone else worse-off.

=== Pope Pius XI ===
In his encyclical Quadragesimo Anno, Pope Pius XI affirmed homesteading as the source of ownership. For Pius, ownership is acquired by occupying something not already owned and performing labour on it. Pius argues no wrong occurs if something available but not belonging to anyone is occupied, and it is a person's labour changing or increasing its value which gives them the right to it.

=== Murray Rothbard ===
Libertarian philosopher and Austrian School economist Murray Rothbard argued that homesteading includes all the rights needed to engage in the homesteading action, including nuisance and pollution rights. He uses the example of establishing an airport which produces x decibels of noise in the empty land surrounding it. Houses are then developed on the land and the homeowners sue the airport for noise pollution. While the noise can otherwise be considered aggression, the airport has already acquired the right to x decibels of noise through homesteading its land and the land surrounding it. Legally, Rothbard considers this an easement right to create x decibels of noise, "an example of the ancient legal concept of 'prescription', in which a certain activity earns a prescriptive property right to the person engaging in the action."

Rothbard interpreted the physical extent to which a homesteading act establishes ownership in terms of the relevant "technological unit", which is the minimal amount necessary for the practical use of the resource. According to Rothbard, the size of the unit also "must be determined by judges, juries, or arbitrators who are expert in the particular resource or industry in question."

=== Anthony de Jasay ===
Hungarian political philosopher Anthony de Jasay argued that a homesteader, having a claim prior to any other, must be prima facie considered the owner of the resource, in accordance with the principle "let ownership stand":

[If] taking first possession of a thing is a feasible act of his that is admissible if it is not a tort (in this case not trespass) and violates no right; but this is the case by definition, i.e., by the thing being identified as "unowned". Taking exclusive possession of it is, in terms of our classification of possible acts, a liberty, and as such only a contrary right can obstruct or oppose it.

According to de Jasay, opponents to this are claiming that there is no previous owner from which someone else could have properly obtained it, and at the same time that someone is entitled to use it and can object to exclusion from it. Entitlement to the thing, de Jasay argues, requires at least partial ownership or the permission of an owner. If someone were using it without entitlement because neither they nor anyone else would or could take possession of it previously, then their rights to it are not violated if a third party claims ownership.

=== Hans-Hermann Hoppe ===
Similarly to de Jasay, Hans-Hermann Hoppe argues that the denial of the homesteading rule entails a performative contradiction. That is because honest argumentation must presuppose an intersubjectively ascertainable (i.e. justifiable) norm, and all norms not relying on the original establishment of a physical (and therefore evident) link to the owner are subjective in nature, and therefore contradict the presuppositions of argumentation. According to Hoppe, if homesteading rights were prohibited or limited, ownership could only be acquired by decree, which would create problems if multiple contradictory claims were made. This would also allow one to claim ownership over another's body, contradicting self-ownership.

According to commentators, he initially subscribed to a labour theory of property view and later to a first possession theory of property view.

=== Ayn Rand ===
Ayn Rand did not elaborate on the characteristics of homesteading, but she expressed support for compatible laws such as favourably citing the Homestead Act (1862). The government offered a 160-acre farm to adult citizens who settled and cultivated it for five years, turning public land private. While Rand did not find this to have the right explicit ideological intention and the land was originally considered public property, she considered its de facto method of allocating private property to follow the proper principle. Ownership of property began with citizens working unused resources, and the government did not act as an owner but rather as a "custodian of ownerless resources who defines objectively impartial rules by which potential owners may acquire them."

=== Linda and Morris Tannehill ===
Linda and Morris Tannehill argued in their 1970 book The Market for Liberty that physically claiming the land (e.g. by fencing it in or prominently staking it out) should be enough to obtain good title. They reject the notion that someone mixing labour with land makes it their property, as the exact amount or kind of labour required is unclear, such as if a man only dug a hole and refilled it. They question how permanent a change must be, how much land's economic value must be improved, and how soon it must be improved, such as the case of a man losing the title to his land "if he had to wait ten months for a railroad line to be built before he could improve the land". They also suggest that someone may want to keep land untouched in order to study its ecology.

== In law ==
There are two different legal systems from which land ownership, and its scope, derive: Common law and statute law. A frequent issue of contention in both cases is the ownership of resources passing across property, such as streams or rivers, to which others downstream may assert property / water rights, and underground resources, such as subterranean water and minerals.

For limits to ownership above land, an old principle in the law is ad coelum, meaning that property rights extend "to the sky" (and below the earth). In the past, rights to "the sky" have been unenforceable – birds need take little notice of humans' overhead property rights – but with modern technology extending human reach, the idea of ad coelum rights may change. (Note: Some jurisdictions establish height limits to trespass, for example low-flying aircraft may cross over property, but must remain above a certain height limit (often above 500 feet). In 1946 the U.S. the Supreme Court established a height-limit to property rights when it ruled in United States v. Causby (in the context of air traffic) that a landowner's exclusive use of private property ends at an altitude of 365 feet (111 1/4m) above the land surface. In their ruling, the justices renounced the principle of ad coelum as manifestly unworkable in modern practice. FAA and FCC regulations require tall buildings and tall antennas (typically taller than 50 feet) to be clearly marked with warning lights, hence at that height landowners' free use of their property (say, to loft a tethered balloon) becomes encumbered, although only slightly. Note however, that the regulations do not prevent use of the property to build tall structures per se; they merely require that tall structures, when built, must be marked so that they are clearly visible at all times. Above some height any tall structure must be registered with the FAA, with narrow antenna towers being of particular concern, and having lower altitude limits, since they may on occasion be more difficult for pilots to see than tall buildings. The only case where tall structures are expressly forbidden to property owners is when slender towers are tall enough to cross a property line, should they fall (hence possible and eventually likely trespass by the fallen tower on a neighbor's property) or if the structure impinges on an existing air traffic right of way, such as the approach path to an airport. In that special case, the right of way itself constitutes an established property right to the airspace, which belongs to the airport, even if it extends beyond the airport property-line.) (Note: For example, with ad coelum rights to the sky over one's property, the presence of a low-flying drone overhead constitutes trespass. (Note: In fact, in the absence of exceptional authority created by statute, the drone is illegal property trespass even when it belongs to law enforcement – say a surveillance drone – if the law enforcement agents who launched the drone have no search warrant, or they do have a warrant, but have failed to present it to the property owner or resident.) Since there is no complicating issue of threatening a human life, only some person's possession, it would appear that any landowner has a free and clear right to shoot down a drone intruding over the property, just as he or she would have in the case of an intruding nuisance dog. In either case, the drone owner or the dog owner may be intensely upset by the loss of property or the companion animal, but would have no moral grounds nor legal recourse, due to the drone or dog's violation of the landowner's property right. This is well established in both common law and in some statute law in the case of a trespassing dog, but not so in the case of the new technology – the intruding drone aircraft – where neither statute nor common law has had time to sort out most of the issues involved, in most places.)

=== Common law ===
Under the ad coelum doctrine land ownership extends in a cone from the Earth's core up to the exosphere

Common law provides the ad coelum ("to the sky") doctrine by which landowners own everything below and above the land, up to the sky and below the earth to its core, with the exception of volatile minerals such as natural gas. The rules governing what constitutes homesteading were not specified by common law but by the local statutory law. Common law also recognizes the concept of adverse possession ("squatters' rights").

Murray Rothbard criticized this doctrine as incompatible with his own homestead principle, as a literal application prevents aircraft from traveling over someone's land. He further argued that the homestead principle undermines ad coelum on the basis that someone homesteading their soil is not also doing so with the sky above them. So long as the aircraft did not damage or disturb the land, the owner would not have a claim. By the same principle, ownership of mineral and water resources on or under the land would also require homesteading, otherwise being left unowned.

=== Statutory law ===
In the 19th century, a number of governments formalized the homestead principle by passing laws that would grant property of land plots of certain standardized size to people who would settle on it and "improve" it in certain ways (typically, built their residence and started to farm at least a certain fraction of the land). Typically, such laws would apply to territories recently taken from their indigenous inhabitants, and which the state would want to have populated by farmers. Examples include:

- New South Wales: Crown Lands Acts (1861)
- Canada: Dominion Lands Act (1872)
- United States: Florida Armed Occupation Act (1842), Homestead Act (1862)

== See also ==
- Classical liberalism
- Entitlement theory
- Estate in land
- Factors of production
- Finders, keepers
- Georgism
- Labor theory of property
- Land rights
- Lockean proviso
- Occupatio
- Positive law
- Possession is nine-tenths of the law
- Seasteading
- Squatting
