= Tortious interference =

Sabotaging someone else's business relationship with a third party

Tortious interference, also known as intentional interference with contractual relations, in the common law of torts, occurs when one person intentionally damages someone else's contractual or business relationships with a third party, causing economic harm. As an example, someone could use blackmail to induce a contractor into breaking a contract; they could threaten a supplier to prevent them from supplying goods or services to another party; or they could obstruct someone's ability to honor a contract with a client by deliberately refusing to deliver necessary goods.

A tort of negligent interference occurs when one party's negligence damages the contractual or business relationship between others, causing economic harm, such as by blocking a waterway or causing a blackout that prevents the utility company from being able to uphold its existing contracts with consumers.

== Description ==
=== Tortious interference with contract rights ===
Tortious interference with contract rights can occur when one party persuades another to breach its contract with a third party (e.g., using blackmail, threats, influence, etc.) or where someone knowingly interferes with a contractor's ability to perform his contractual obligations, preventing the client from receiving the services or goods promised (e.g., by refusing to deliver goods). The tortfeasor is the person who interferes with the contractual relationship between others. When a tortfeasor is aware of an existing contract and deliberately induces a breach by one of the contract holders, it is termed "tortious inducement of breach of contract".

=== Tortious interference with a business relationship ===
Tortious interference with business relationships occurs where the tortfeasor intentionally acts to prevent someone from successfully establishing or maintaining business relationships with others. This tort may occur when one party knowingly takes an action that causes a second party not to enter into a business relationship with a third party that otherwise would probably have occurred. An example is when a tortfeasor offers to sell a property to someone below market value knowing they were in the final stages of a sale with a third party pending the upcoming settlement date to formalize the sale writing. Such conduct is termed "tortious interference with a business expectancy".

=== Tortious interference with an expected inheritance ===
A person who, by tortious means, intentionally prevents another from receiving from a third person an inheritance or gift that he would otherwise have received is subject to liability to the other for loss of the inheritance or gift.

=== Negligent tortious interference ===
The above situations are actionable only if someone with actual knowledge of, and intent to interfere with, an existing contract or expectancy between other parties, acts improperly with malicious intent and actually interferes with the contract/expectancy, causing economic harm. Historically, there has not been actionable cause if the interference was merely negligent. However, some United States jurisdictions recognize such claims, although many do not. A tort of negligent interference occurs when one party's negligence damages the contractual or business relationship between others, causing economic harm, such as by blocking a waterway or causing a blackout preventing the utility company from being able to uphold its existing contracts with consumers.

== Case law ==
An early (perhaps the earliest) instance of recognition of this tort occurred in Garret v Taylor, 79 Eng. Rep. 485 (K.B. 1620). In that case, the defendant drove customers away from the plaintiff's quarry by threatening them with mayhem and also threatening to "vex [them] with suits". The Court of King's Bench said that "the defendant threatened violence to the extent of committing an assault upon ... customers of the plaintiff ... whereupon 'they all desisted from buying'." The court therefore upheld a judgment for the plaintiff.

In a similar case, Tarleton v McGawley, 170 Eng. Rep. 153 (K.B. 1793), the defendant shot from its ship, Othello, off the coast of Africa upon natives while "contriving and maliciously intending to hinder and deter the natives from trading with" plaintiff's rival trading ship, Bannister. This action caused the natives (plaintiff's prospective customers) to flee the scene, depriving the plaintiff of their potential business. The King's Bench held the conduct actionable. The defendant claimed, by way of justification, that the local native ruler had given it an exclusive franchise to trade with his subjects, but the court rejected this defense.

The tort was described in the case of Keeble v Hickeringill (1707) 103 Eng. Rep. 1127, styled as a "trespass on the case". In that case, the defendant had used a shotgun to drive ducks away from a pond that the plaintiff had built for the purpose of capturing ducks. Thus, unlike the foregoing cases, here the actionable conduct was not directly driving the prospective customers away, but rather eliminating the subject matter of the prospective business. Although the ducks had not yet been captured, the Justice Holt wrote for the court that "where a violent or malicious act is done to a man's occupation, profession, or way of getting a livelihood, there an action lies in all cases." The court noted that the defendant would have the right to draw away ducks to a pond of his own, raising as a comparison a 1410 case in which the court deemed that no cause of action would lie where a schoolmaster opened a new school that drew students away from an old school.

The application of the above has since been modified in English law. In OBG v Allan [2008] 1 AC 1, wrongful interference, the unified theory which treated causing loss by unlawful means as an extension of the tort of inducing a breach of contract, was abandoned; (Note: The unified theory was adopted by the Court of Appeal in DC Thomson & Co Ltd v Deakin (1952)) inducing breach of contract and causing loss by unlawful means were two separate torts. Inducing a breach of contract was a tort of accessory liability, and an intention to cause a breach of contract was a necessary and sufficient requirement for liability; a person had to know that he was inducing a breach of contract and to intend to do so; that a conscious decision not to inquire into the existence of a fact could be treated as knowledge for the purposes of the tort; that a person who knowingly induced a breach of contract as a means to an end had the necessary intent even if he was not motivated by malice but had acted with the motive of securing an economic advantage for himself; that, however, a breach of contract which was neither an end in itself nor a means to an end but was merely a foreseeable consequence of a person's acts did not give rise to liability; and that there could be no secondary liability without primary liability, and therefore a person could not be liable for inducing a breach of contract unless there had in fact been a breach by the contracting party.

Acts against a third party counted as unlawful means only if they were actionable by that third party if he had suffered loss; that unlawful means consisted of acts intended to cause loss to the claimant by interfering with the freedom of a third party in a way which was unlawful as against that third party and which was intended to cause loss to the claimant, but did not include acts which might be unlawful against a third party but which did not affect his freedom to deal with the claimant. Strict liability for conversion applied only to an interest in chattels and not to chooses in action; this was too radical to impose liability for pure economic loss on receivers who had been appointed and had acted in good faith. This also left open the position where they breached the duty of good faith.

== Typical examples ==
1. Tortious interference of business – When false claims and accusations are made against a business or an individual's reputation in order to drive business away.
2. Tortious interference of contract – When an individual uses "tort" (a wrongful act) to come between two parties' mutual contract.

=== Striking ===
In the United Kingdom, a trade union encouraging or facilitating workers to take strike action commits tortious interference with the employees' contracts of employment, unless the action is conducted in accordance with Part V of the Trade Union and Labour Relations (Consolidation) Act 1992, as amended.

== Elements ==
Although the specific elements required to prove a claim of tortious interference vary from one jurisdiction to another, they typically include the following:

1. The existence of a contractual relationship or beneficial business relationship between two parties.
2. Knowledge of that relationship by a third party.
3. Intent of the third party to induce a party to the relationship to breach the relationship.
4. Lack of any privilege on the part of the third party to induce such a breach.
5. The contractual relationship is breached.
6. Damage to the party against whom the breach occurs.

The first element may, in employment-at-will jurisdictions, be held fulfilled in regards to a previously unterminated employer/employee relationship.

In California, these are the elements of negligent interference with prospective economic advantage, which the plaintiff must establish:

1. an economic relationship existed between the plaintiff and a third party which contained a reasonably probable future economic benefit or advantage to plaintiff;
2. the defendant knew of the existence of the relationship and was aware or should have been aware that if it did not act with due care its actions would interfere with this relationship and cause plaintiff to lose in whole or in part the probable future economic benefit or advantage of the relationship;
3. the defendant was negligent; and
4. such negligence caused damage to plaintiff in that the relationship was actually interfered with or disrupted and plaintiff lost in whole or in part the economic benefits or advantage reasonably expected from the relationship.

Some cases add that a defendant acts negligently only if the defendant owes the plaintiff a duty of care.

California and most jurisdictions hold that there is a privilege to compete for business. "Under the privilege of free competition, a competitor is free to divert business to himself as long as he uses fair and reasonable means. Thus, the plaintiff must present facts indicating the defendant's interference is somehow wrongful—i.e., based on facts that take the defendant's actions out of the realm of legitimate business transactions." "[T]he competition privilege is defeated only where the defendant engages in unlawful or illegitimate means." "Wrongful" in this context means "independently wrongful"—that is, "blameworthy" or "independently wrongful apart from the interference itself". This may be termed use of improper means. "Commonly included among improper means are actions which are independently actionable, violations of federal or state law or unethical business practices, e.g., violence, misrepresentation, unfounded litigation, defamation, trade libel or trade mark infringement." Other examples of wrongful conduct are "fraud, misrepresentation, intimidation, coercion, obstruction or molestation of the rival or his servants or workmen".

== Damages ==
Typical legal damages for tortious interference include economic losses, if they can be proven with certainty, and mental distress. Additionally punitive damages may be awarded if malice on the part of the wrongdoer can be established.

Equitable remedies may include injunctive relief in the form of a negative injunction that would be used to prevent the wrongdoer from benefiting from any contractual relationship that may arise out of the interference, i.e., the performance of a singer who was originally contracted with the plaintiff to perform at the same time.

== See also ==
- Contorts
- Alienation of affections

== Sources ==
- Jesse Dukeminier and James E. Krier, Property, Fifth Edition, Aspen Law & Business (New York, 2002), pp. 31–36. ISBN 0-7355-2437-8
- John L. Diamond and Lawrence C. Levine and M. Stuart Madden, Understanding Torts Second Edition, Lexis Nexis (New York, 2000), p. 413. ISBN 0-8205-5219-4
