= Pierson v. Post =

1805 American property law case

- Court: New York Supreme Court of Judicature
- Decided: 1805
- Citation: 3 Cai. R. 175, 2 Am. Dec. 264 (Note: 3 Cai. R. 175 is an abbreviation for volume 3 of Caines' Reports, page 175, which was in turn named for George Caines, who reported New York cases in the early 19th century.)

Case history
- Prior actions: Pierson v. Post, unreported case in the court of Queens County (Note: Subsequent research in "The Lost Record of "Pierson v. Post," the Famous Fox Case" (p. 161) has shown that there was an error either in the decision or Caine's reporting. The Justice of the Peace who heard the case was from Suffolk County, not Queens County.)

Court membership
- Judges sitting: James Kent; Daniel Tompkins; Henry Brockholst Livingston

Case opinions
- Majority: Tompkins; Dissent: Livingston

Pierson v. Post is an early American legal case from the State of New York that later became a foundational case in the field of property law. It was a case where the labor theory of property and the first possession theory of property clashed.

The case involved an incident that took place in 1802 at an uninhabited beach near Southampton, New York. Lodowick Post, a local resident, was out with a hunting party when his hunting dogs caught the scent of a fox and began pursuing it. As they drew near the fox, Jesse Pierson, another local resident, saw the fox—though he denied seeing Post and his party—and promptly killed it and carried it off for himself. Post filed a lawsuit against Pierson claiming that because he had already begun pursuing the fox, the property of the fox's pelt and carcass were rightfully his, not Pierson's. The local justice ruled in favor of Post. Pierson appealed the ruling to the New York Supreme Court of Judicature, (Note: In 1805, the New York Supreme Court of Judicature was an appellate court. Today, the New York Supreme Court is a trial court.) which in 1805 reversed the justice's decision and ruled in favor of Pierson. At the time of the decision, the New York Supreme Court of Judicature was the state's highest court.

Pierson v. Post is generally considered the most famous property law case in American legal history. Although it only involved a dispute over which of two men deserved ownership of a fox, adjudicating the dispute required determining at what point a wild animal becomes "property". The judges chose not to follow common law precedent on wild animal capture, and so were forced to synthesize reasoning from a variety of well-known historical legal treatises—ranging from the Institutes of Justinian in the 6th century to the writings of Henry de Bracton in the 13th century and Samuel von Pufendorf in the 17th century—into a coherent principle on how property can be first possessed by a human being. Determining the rightful ownership of the fox involved the essence of the human notion of "property" itself and how it is created, and for this reason Pierson v. Post is included in nearly all Anglo-American property casebooks.

== Background ==
Lodowick Post, a fox hunter, was chasing a fox through a vacant lot on December 10, 1802, when Pierson came across the fox and, knowing it was being chased by another, killed the fox and took it away. Post sued Pierson on an action for trespass on the case for damages against his possession of the fox. Post argued that he had ownership of the fox as giving chase to an animal in the course of hunting it was sufficient to establish possession. The trial court found in favor of Post.

On appeal after the trial, the issue put to the Supreme Court of Judicature of New York was whether one could obtain property rights to a wild animal (Ferae naturae), in this case the fox, by pursuit. The Supreme Court case was heard by Chief Justice James Kent, then one of the nation's preeminent jurists, and associate justices Daniel Tompkins (who later became Vice President of the United States) and Henry Brockholst Livingston (who later served as a Justice of the U.S. Supreme Court).

The lesser known historical context is that Pierson was one of the proprietors who had inherited special rights in the undivided lands where the fox was caught. The fox hunt happened while there was dispute over whether the proprietors or the town residents as a whole had common land rights. Although Post did not have proprietors’ rights, his father was wealthy. Post's fox hunt in the commons was a method of displaying his wealth. By contrast, the Piersons were mostly farmers and town leaders, and would only hunt the foxes out of necessity. Therefore, historian Bethany Berger has argued that the dispute was not really about the fox, but instead about the regulation of the town's common resources and if agricultural traditions or wealthy traditions would be central to the town.

== Ruling ==
=== Majority opinion ===
Justice Tompkins wrote the majority opinion. The Court cited ancient precedent in deciding the case:

If we have recourse to the ancient writers upon general principles of law, the judgment below is obviously erroneous. Justinian's Institutes, and Fleta, adopt the principle, that pursuit alone vests no property or right in the huntsman; and that even pursuit, accompanied with wounding, is equally ineffectual for that purpose, unless the animal be actually taken. The same principle is recognized by Bracton.

Puffendorf defines occupancy of beasts feræ naturæ, to be the actual corporeal possession of them, and Bynkershoeck is cited as coinciding in this definition. It is indeed with hesitation that Puffendorf affirms that a wild beast mortally wounded, or greatly maimed, cannot be fairly intercepted by another, whilst the pursuit of the person inflicting the wound continues. The foregoing authorities are decisive to show that mere pursuit gave Post no legal right to the fox, but that he became the property of Pierson, who intercepted and killed him. [Citations omitted]

The court reasoned that given the common law requirement to have control over one's possessions, merely giving chase was not sufficient. Something more was needed, otherwise law would create a slippery slope.

If the first seeing, starting, or pursuing such animals, without having so wounded, circumvented or ensnared the animal, so as to deprive them of their natural liberty, and subject them to the control of their pursuer, should afford the basis of actions against others for intercepting and killing them, it would prove a fertile course of quarrels and litigation.

The majority opinion found that though it may have been rude for Pierson to have killed the fox, there was no reason to object as only the person to mortally wound or seize the animal can acquire possession of it. Furthermore, this rule is easy to administer. While it is easy to determine who has captured a wild animal, it would be very difficult to determine who was the first to pursue a wild animal. Alternatively, one may use the principle of first in time to understand this case: “He who first occupies a wild animal owns it.” Of course, the fight is over whether one must be the first to chase a wild animal or the first to capture it. The majority rules that one must be the first to capture it. Interestingly, the majority went against the established custom, which recognized hot pursuit as vesting a right of ownership in the pursuer.

Among the authorities cited by the court in its opinion were the works of William Blackstone, Fleta, Jean Barbeyrac, Samuel von Pufendorf, Hugo Grotius, and Justinian I.

=== Dissent ===
Justice Livingston dissented. Livingston was unsatisfied with the authorities cited in the majority opinion. Instead he argued that pursuit should be considered sufficient, as it serves a useful purpose of encouraging hunters to rid the countryside of that "wild and noxious beast" known as the fox. Livingston further acknowledged that possession can be seen in relative terms where the continued chase may merely be a formality of the pre-existing control already exerted by the hunter.

Livingston was also of the view that the question in Pierson "should have been submitted to the arbitration of sportsmen". In such an event, due to local custom, Post likely would have been victorious. To put it a different way, Livingston believed that if you were to ask local hunters how they felt about pursuit with respect to possession, they would have largely "regarded hot pursuit as giving rights to take an unimpeded first possession". Livingston also regarded Pierson as a "saucy intruder".

== Conclusion ==
The trial court was reversed so Pierson did not have to pay any damages. As one commenter wrote:

Jesse Pierson, son of Capt. David, coming from Amagansett, saw a fox run and hide down an unused well near Peters Pond and killed and took the fox. Lodowick Post and a company with him were in pursuit and chasing the fox and saw Jesse with it and claimed it as theirs, while Jesse persisted in his claim. Capt. Pierson said his son Jesse should have the fox and Capt. Post said the same of his son Lodowick and hence the law suit contested and appealed to the highest court in the State which decided that Post had not got the possession of the fox when Pierson killed it and that he had no property in it as against Pierson until he had reduced it into his own possession. This became the leading case often cited because it established; and I think, for the first time, by the court of last resort in the State, that to give an individual right in wild animals, the claimant must capture them. To the public the decision was worth its cost. To the parties who each expended over a thousand pounds, the fox cost very dear.

-James T. Adams, Memorials of Old Bridgehampton 166 (1916, 1962)

On the other hand, Bethany R. Berger notes in "It's Not About the Fox: The Untold Story of Pierson v. Post" that the dispute may have really been about use of the land on which the fox was caught, part of the commons in which Pierson's family, like other descendants of the original settlers of Bridgehampton, had special rights.

== Aftermath of Pierson ==
Beginning first as a complaint in a Justice's court, the declaration described the beach as "a certain wild and uninhabited, unpossessed and wasteland, called the beach." This "waste land" is now part of one of the wealthiest resort communities in the United States.

== See also ==
- Ghen v. Rich
- Keeble v Hickeringill
- Ratione soli
- Roman law
- Rule of capture
- Labor theory of property
- First possession theory of property
