= Law of the air =

Law of the air may refer to:

- Aviation law and modern laws applying to airspace
- Cuius est solum eius est usque ad coelum et ad inferos, a medieval property law
