= Rattlesdene v Grunestone =

Rattlesdene v Grunestone (YB 10 Edw II (54 SS) 140) is a 1317 case in English law.

== Facts ==
The plaintiff claimed that the defendant had sold him a bottle of wine but, before delivery, drew off much of the wine and replaced it with salt water.

== Commentary ==
The academics Mark Lunney and Ken Oliphant argue that in reality the case was likely the result of a shipping accident with the facts fabricated to allow the court to circumvent the vi et armis requirements which required that loss be suffered 'with force and arms' if a claim was to be brought.

== See also ==
- Trespass on the case
