= Territorial principle =

Principle in international law

The territorial principle (also territoriality principle) is a principle of public international law which enables a sovereign state to exercise exclusive jurisdiction over individuals and other legal persons within its territory. It includes both the right to prosecute individuals for criminal offences committed within its borders, as well as the right to arrest and apprehend individuals within its territory. Its corollary bars states from exercising jurisdiction within the territory of other states without their express consent, unless such an exercise can be based on other principles of jurisdiction, such as the principle of nationality, the passive personality principle, the protective principle, and possibly, the principle of universal jurisdiction.

The Lotus case was a key court ruling on the territoriality principle. In 1926, a French vessel collided with a Turkish vessel, causing the death of several Turkish nationals. The Permanent Court of International Justice ruled, by a bare majority, that Turkey had jurisdiction to try the French naval lieutenant for criminal negligence, even though the incident happened beyond Turkey's boundaries. This case extended the territoriality principle to cover cases that happen outside a state's boundaries, but have a substantial effect on the state's interests or involve its citizens.

Questions have surfaced regarding how the territoriality principle applies with the rise of globalization and the Internet. The applicability of this principle was in question with the case against Augusto Pinochet and other cases of transnational justice.

== See also ==
- Ad coelum
- Jurisdiction (area)
- Ratione soli
