= Labor theory of property =

Theory of natural law

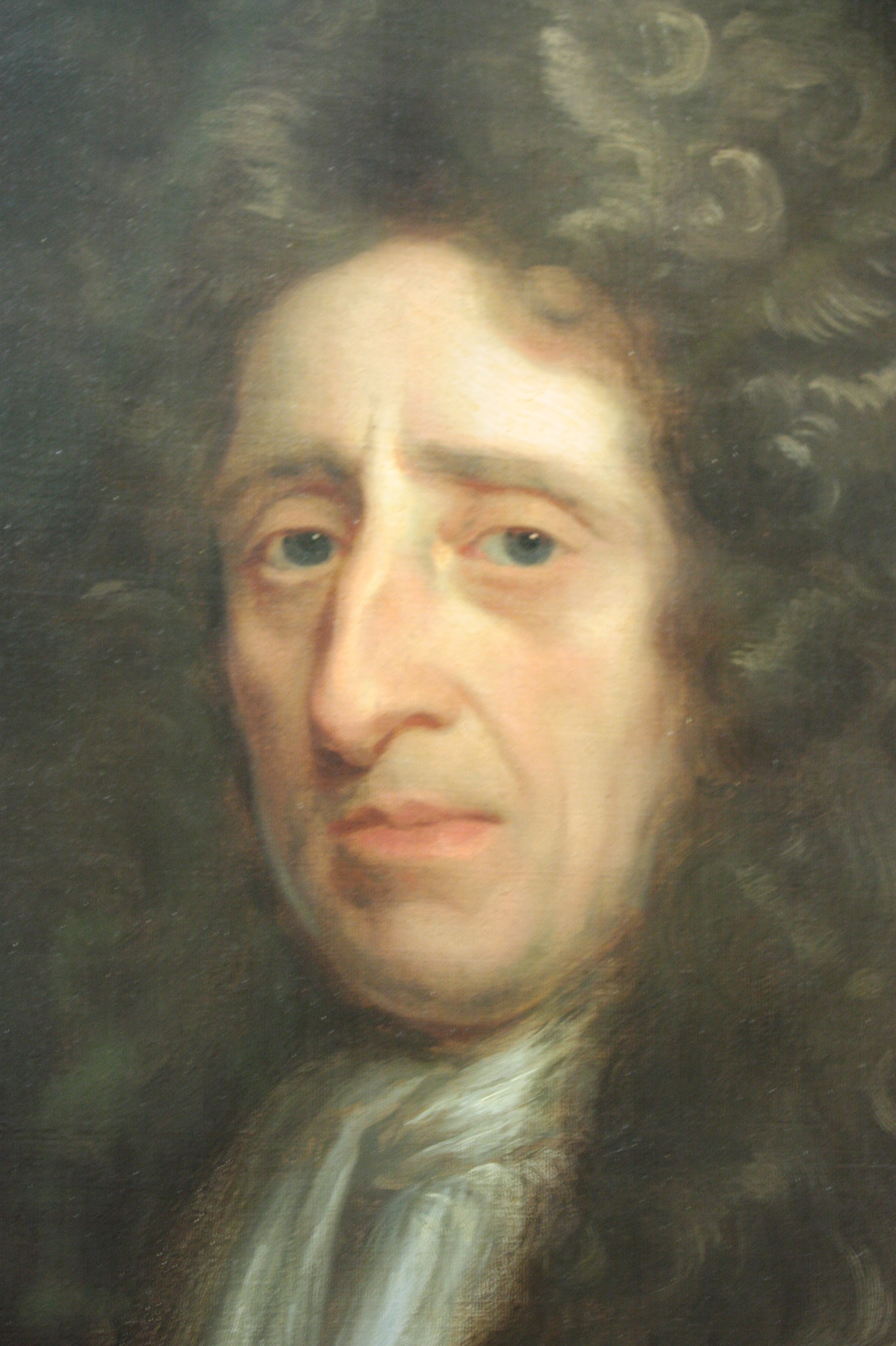
John Locke's portrait by Godfrey Kneller, National Portrait Gallery, London

The labor theory of property, also called the labor theory of appropriation, labor theory of ownership, labor theory of entitlement, and principle of first appropriation, is a theory of natural law that holds that property originally comes about by the exertion of labor upon natural resources. The theory has been used to justify the homestead principle, which holds that one may gain whole permanent ownership of an unowned natural resource by performing an act of original appropriation.

In his Second Treatise on Government, the philosopher John Locke asked by what right an individual can claim to own one part of the world, when, according to the Bible, God gave the world to all humanity in common. He answered that, although persons belong to God, they own the fruits of their labor. When a person works, that labor enters into the object upon which they are working. Thus, the object becomes the property of that person; however, Locke held that one may only appropriate property in this fashion if the Lockean proviso held true, that is, "... there is enough, and as good, left in common for others".

== Locke's formulation ==
Though the earth, and all inferiour creatures, be common to all men, yet every man has a property in his own person: this nobody has any right to but himself. The labour of his body, and the work of his hands, we may say, are properly his. Whatsoever then he removes out of the state that nature hath provided, and left it in, he hath mixed his labour with, and joined to it something that is his own, and thereby makes it his property. It being by him removed from the common state nature hath placed it in, it hath by this labour something annexed to it, that excludes the common right of other men. For this labour being the unquestionable property of the labourer, no man but he can have a right to what that is once joined to, at least where there is enough, and as good, left in common for others.

— John Locke, Two Treatises of Government, § 27

== Exclusive ownership and creation ==
Locke argued in support of individual property rights as natural rights. Following the argument, the fruits of one's labor are one's own because one worked for it. Thus, any form of income tax would be hostile to natural law. Furthermore, the laborer must also hold a natural property right in the resource itself because exclusive ownership was immediately necessary for production.

Jean-Jacques Rousseau later criticized this second step in Discourse on Inequality, where he argues that the natural right argument does not extend to resources that one did not create. Both philosophers hold that the relation between labor and ownership pertains only to property that was significantly unused before such labor took place.

== Enclosure vs mixing labor ==
Land in its original state would be considered unowned by anyone, but if an individual applied his labor to the land by farming it, for example, it becomes his property. Merely placing a fence around land rather than using the land enclosed would not bring property into being according to most natural law theorists.

Economist Murray Rothbard put it this way:

If Columbus lands on a new continent, is it legitimate for him to proclaim all the new continent his own, or even that sector 'as far as his eye can see'? Clearly, this would not be the case in the free society that we are postulating. Columbus or Crusoe would have to use the land, to 'cultivate' it in some way, before he could be asserted to own it.... If there is more land than can be used by a limited labor supply, then the unused land must simply remain unowned until a first user arrives on the scene. Any attempt to claim a new resource that someone does not use would have to be considered invasive of the property right of whoever the first user will turn out to be.

== Acquisition vs mixing labor ==
The labor theory of property does not only apply to land itself, but to any application of labor to nature. For example, natural rights thinker Lysander Spooner, says that an apple taken from an unowned tree would become the property of the person who plucked it, as he has labored to acquire it. He says the "only way, in which ["the wealth of nature"] can be made useful to mankind, is by their taking possession of it individually, and thus making it private property."

== Lockean proviso ==
Locke held that individuals have a right to homestead private property from nature by working on it, but that they can do so only "...at least where there is enough, and as good, left in common for others". The proviso maintains that appropriation of unowned resources is a diminution of the rights of others to it and would be acceptable only so long as it does not make anyone worse off than they would have been before. The phrase "Lockean Proviso" was coined by political philosopher Robert Nozick and is based on the ideas elaborated by John Locke in his Second Treatise of Government.

== Criticism ==
Aside from critiques of natural rights as a whole, Locke's labor theory of property has been singled out for critique by modern academics who doubt the idea that mixing something owned with something unowned could imbue the object with ownership:

[W]hy isn't mixing what I own with what I don't own a way of losing what I own rather than a way of gaining what I don't? If I own a can of tomato juice and spill it in the sea so that its molecules (made radioactive, so I can check this) mingle evenly throughout the sea, do I thereby come to own the sea, or have I foolishly dissipated my tomato juice?

— Robert Nozick, Anarchy, State, and Utopia

Jeremy Waldron believes that Locke has made a category mistake, as only objects can be mixed with other objects and laboring is not an object, but an activity.

Stephan Kinsella also agrees with this line of thinking, criticizing the Objectivists for trying to defend intellectual property in terms of mixing labor, and arguing that we should think in terms of the First possession theory of property rather than the Labor theory of property:

By focusing on first occupancy, rather than on labor, as the key to homesteading, there is no need to place creation as the fount of property rights, as Objectivists and others do. Instead, property rights must be recognized in first-comers (or their contractual transferees) in order to avoid the omnipresent problem of conflict over scarce resources. Creation itself is neither necessary nor sufficient to gain rights in unowned resources. Further, there is no need to maintain the strange view that one “owns” one s labor in order to own things one first occupies. Labor is a type of action, and action is not ownable; rather, it is the way that some tangible things (e.g., bodies) act in the world.

— Kinsella Stephan(2008), Against Intellectual Property

Judith Jarvis Thomson points out that the act of laboring makes Locke's argument either an appeal to desert, in which case the reward is arbitrary-"Why not instead a medal and a handshake from the president?"-or little different than first possession theories that existed before Locke.

Ellen Meiksins Wood provides a number of critiques of Locke's labor theory of property from a Marxist perspective. Wood notes that Locke is not actually concerned with the act of labor or improving the use value of property, but rather is focused on the creation of exchange value as the basis of property.

For one thing, it turns out that there is no direct correspondence between labour and property, because one man can appropriate the labour of another. He can acquire a right of property in something by 'mixing' with it not his own labour but the labour of someone else whom he employs. It appears that the issue for Locke has less to do with the activity of labour as such than with its profitable use. In calculating the value of the acre in America, for instance, he talks not about the Indian's expenditure of effort, labour, but about the Indian's failure to realize a profit. The issue, in other words, is not the labour of a human being but the productivity of property, its exchange value and its application to commercial profit.

— Ellen Meiksins Wood, The Origin of Capitalism, pg. 111

In addition to the theoretical deficiencies of Locke's theory of property, Wood also argues that Locke also provides a justification for the dispossession of indigenous land. The idea that making land productive serves as the basis of property rights establishes the corollary that the failure to improve land could mean forfeiting property rights. Under Locke's theory, "[e]ven if land is occupied by indigenous peoples, and even if they make use of the land themselves, their land is still open to legitimate colonial expropriation." Locke's notion that property "derives from the creation of value, from 'improvement' that enhances exchange value, implies not only that mere occupancy is not enough to establish property rights, or even that hunting-gathering cannot establish the right of property while agriculture can, but also that insufficiently productive and profitable agriculture, by the standards of English agrarian capitalism, effectively constitutes waste."

Economist John Quiggin argues that this fits into a larger fundamental criticism of Locke's labor theory of property which values a particular type of labor and land use (i.e., agriculture) over all others. It thus does not recognize usage of land, for example, by hunter-gatherer societies as granting rights to ownership. In essence, the Lockean proviso depends on "the existence of a frontier, beyond which lies boundless usable land. This in turn requires the erasure (mentally and usually in brutal reality) of the people already living beyond the frontier and drawing their sustenance from the land in question." Locke's theories of property rights are often interpreted in the context of his support for chattel slavery of "prisoners captured in war" as a philosophical justification for the enslavement of Black Africans and expulsion or killing of Native Americans by early American colonists to gain their land.

== See also ==
- Original appropriation
- Entitlement theory
- First possession theory of property
- Georgism
- Homestead principle
- Propertarianism
