= Rule of capture =

English common law rule on natural resources

The rule of capture or law of capture, part of English common law and adopted by a number of U.S. states, establishes a rule of non-liability for captured natural resources including groundwater, oil, gas, and game animals. The general rule is that the first person to "capture" such a resource owns that resource. For example, landowners who extract or "capture" groundwater, oil, or gas from a well that bottoms within the subsurface of their land acquire absolute ownership of the substance even if it is drained from the subsurface of another's land. The landowner who captures the substance owes no duty of care to other landowners. For example, a water well owner may dry up wells owned by adjacent landowners without fear of liability unless the groundwater was withdrawn for malicious purposes, the groundwater was put to a beneficial use without waste, or (in Texas) "such conduct is a proximate cause of the subsidence of the land of others." An exception to the rule of capture is that a person who drills for groundwater, oil, or gas may not extract the substance from a well that bottoms within the subsurface estate of another by drilling on a slant.

== Theories of ownership ==
When presented with oil and gas cases, early common law jurists were somewhat reluctant to recognize a corporeal possessory interest in substances that they considered to be fugacious or "wild and migratory" and therefore subject to loss by drainage. Among U.S. states, two different theories of ownership of oil and gas arose. Some states, such as Texas, have adopted the "ownership-in-place" theory for oil and gas that landowners own a corporeal possessory interest (similar to a fee simple) in the substances beneath their land, but their ownership is a determinable fee subject to the rule of capture. Other states, like Oklahoma, have adopted the "exclusive-right-to-take" theory that landowners do not own the substances that underlie their land but merely retain the exclusive right to capture the substances, a non-corporeal interest. The difference between the two theories is primarily of import in determining remedies.

== Boundary determination ==
Subsurface ownership boundaries are the same as those upon the surface, projected downward to the center of the Earth. This concept is based upon a Roman legal principle of property law, cuius est solum eius est usque ad coelum et ad inferos (for whosoever owns the soil, it is theirs up to the sky and down to the depths).

== Conservation acts ==
The rule of capture creates an incentive for owners to drill as many wells as possible on their land so as to extract the groundwater, oil, or gas before their neighbors may capture it. Very dense drilling can result in dissipation of the pressure within an aquifer or oil and gas reservoir and therefore overdrafting of the aquifer or incomplete extraction of the substance. To mitigate that danger, many states have sought to supersede the rule of capture with conservation acts. Such acts enforce prorationing, pooling, and limits on density of drilling to avoid physical waste and ensure maximum ultimate recovery. The means of protecting aquifers from over production include both production limits and well-spacing regulations.

States following the ownership-in-place theory typically have actions available, including adverse possession and trespass.

== See also ==
- Pierson v. Post
- Ratione soli
