= Broadbent Institute =

Canadian progressive think tank

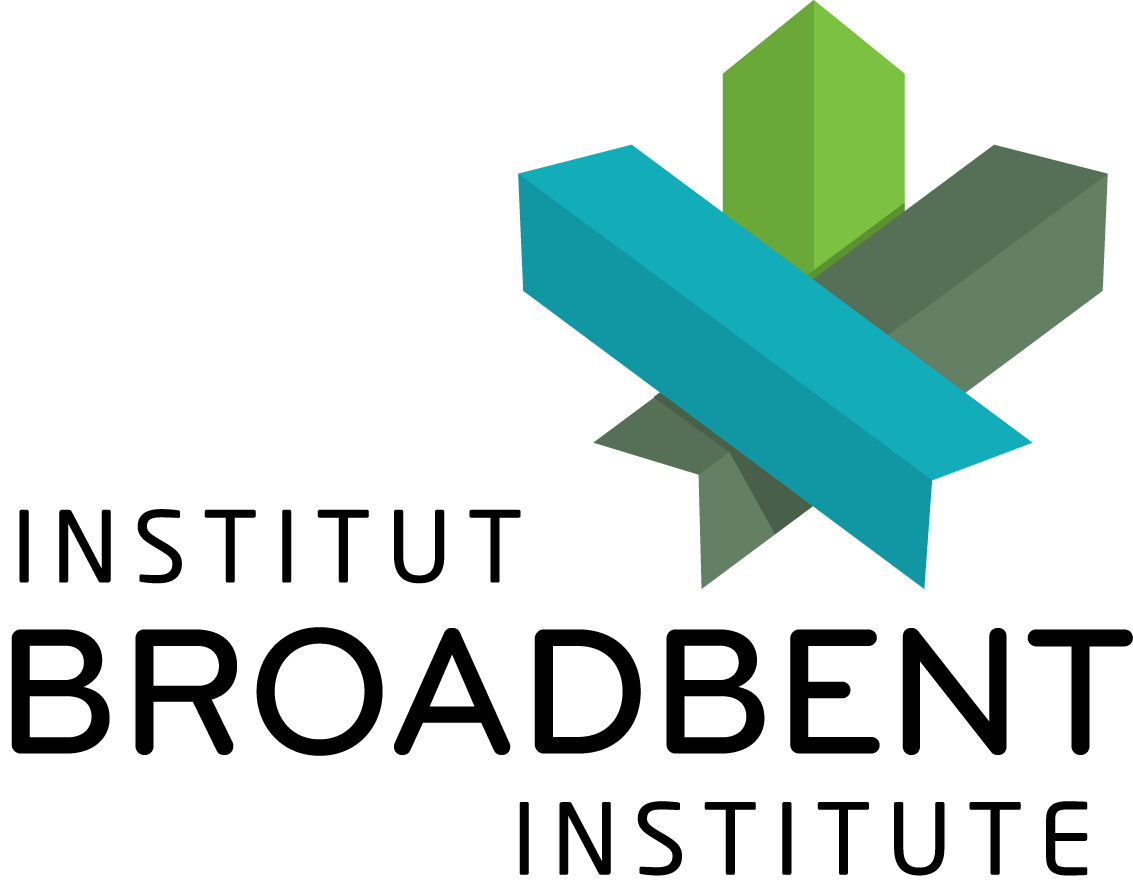
- Formation: 2011
- Founder: Ed Broadbent
- Type: Public policy think tank
- Headquarters: Ottawa, Ontario, Canada
- Chair: Brian Topp
- Executive director: Jen Hassum
- Website: broadbentinstitute.ca

The Broadbent Institute is a Canadian progressive and social democratic think tank founded by Ed Broadbent.

== History ==
The Broadbent Institute is a Canadian progressive and social democratic think tank. It was founded by Ed Broadbent, the leader of the federal New Democratic Party (NDP) from 1975 to 1989. The mission of the Broadbent Institute is to "champion change through the promotion of democracy, equality, and sustainability and the training of a new generation of leaders." The institute believes that "the progressive principles and collective efforts that have made us who we are as a country can inform new ways of thinking and new approaches to government that equip us to address the challenges facing Canadians."

The founding executive director of the institute was Kathleen Monk. Rick Smith became executive director in 2013.

== Structure ==
The Broadbent Institute's board of directors was chaired by Ed Broadbent and comprises prominent progressive leaders, thinkers and campaigners from across the country. The Broadbent Institute has over 60 fellows who inform the institute's research and policy agenda. According to the institute, the fellows “are a diverse, multidisciplinary group of distinguished scholars, policy experts, and leaders from the Canadian business community and civil society.”

== PressProgress ==
In 2013, the Broadbent Institute launched PressProgress, a left-wing news website.

Canadaland included PressProgress along with The Nectarine, North99, Ontario Proud, The Post Millennial, and SpencerFernando.com in its 2019 series—"Guide to new popular, populist political media"—in which they profiled "six relatively new startups that continue to grow more influential by the day in shaping political discourse in Canada." The series described the startups as "new operations" "looking to sway voters in the lead-up" to the 2019 Canadian federal election. Canadaland said that PressProgress regularly reports critical stories about Conservative politicians, business, and media organizations associated with right-wing politics.

In a 2017 Canadaland podcast with PressProgress editor Luke LeBrun and writer and producer Luke Savage, journalist Jesse Brown questioned the claim "that there were no formal links between the federal NDP and the [Broadbent] think tank", by pointing out that stories by PressProgress often "run parallel with NDP talking points and never criticize the NDP for non-progressive choices like supporting a west-to-east pipeline". They responded that they used "traditional tools of journalism, like access to information requests, fact-checking and seeking comment from politicians".

In 2024, the Canadian Journalists for Free Expression awarded LeBrun its Arnold Amber Award for Investigative Journalism.

== Annual summit ==
Each year the Broadbent Institute hosts its annual Progress Summit, convening progressive policy-makers, elected officials, movement-builders, thought leaders and activists from across the country. The location of the Progress Summit alternates between Ottawa and other regions in Canada. These summits have received sponsorships from major Canadian corporations such as Loblaw, Rogers, CN, Air Canada, WestJet, and Telus.

== Research and advocacy ==
In support of the Broadbent Institute's mission to champion progressive change, the institute publishes original research and promotes new ideas, policies, and tools through its blog, special projects and issue-based campaigns. The institute's work focuses on the green economy, income inequality, and democratic renewal.

== Training and leadership ==
As part of the Broadbent Institute's mission to train and support a new generation of leaders, the institute hosts various webinars and workshops aimed at building progressive power in communities across Canada.

In partnership with the Atkinson Foundation, the institute has generated the Power Lab, an arms-length and non-partisan learning initiative centred on the people building community power, on the ground. Alejandra Bravo, the Broadbent Institute's former director of leadership and training, is a director and co-facilitator at the Power Lab.

== Ellen Meiksins Wood Prize and Lecture ==
The Ellen Meiksins Wood Prize and the Ellen Meiksins Wood Lecture were established in 2017 by the Broadbent Institute to honour Ellen Meiksins Wood. The annual prize, worth CA$10,000, is awarded to an academic, labour activist, or writer "who has made an outstanding contribution in political theory, social or economic history, human rights, or sociology". The recipient of the prize delivers the Ellen Meiksins Wood Lecture. Since 2023 this has been held each May at Toronto Metropolitan University. The prize is sponsored by the Rosa Luxemburg Stiftung's New York Office, and presented in partnership with Toronto Metropolitan University Faculty of Arts.

The inaugural prize was won in 2018 by British journalist, playwright, and filmmaker Paul Mason. Other recipients include:

- 2019: Barbara Ehrenreich
- 2020: Leo Gerard
- 2023: Armine Yalnizyan
- 2024: Isabella Weber
- 2025: Grace Blakeley
- 2026: Bhaskar Sunkara
