= Ratione soli =

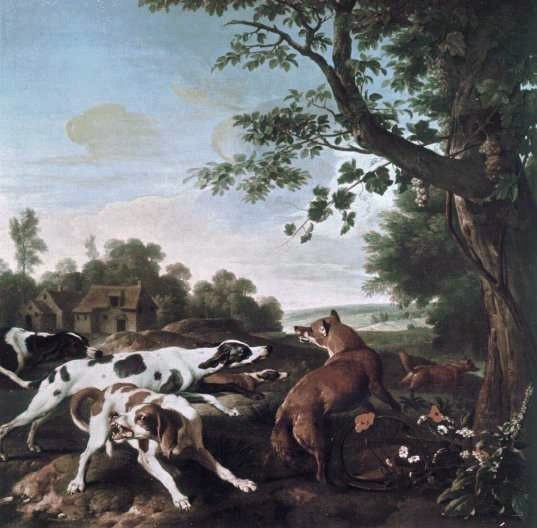
At common law, the right to hunt was restricted to the landowning elite

Ratione soli or is a Latin phrase meaning "according to the soil" or "by reason of the ownership of the soil." In property law, it is a justification for assigning property rights to landowners over resources found on their own land. Traditionally, the doctrine of ratione soli provides landowners "constructive possession of natural resources on, over, and under the surface: cujus est solum, ejus est usque ad coelum ad infernos."

== Origins ==
In ancient Roman law, landowners could only take legal possession of animals by capturing and maintaining physical control over them. English common law originally restricted the right to hunt animals to those who had permission from the Crown, but later laws allowed landowners to hunt animals that entered upon their land through the principle of ratione soli. Over time, this developed into a system of laws where the right to hunt was restricted to nobles and the landowning elite.

== Modern usage ==
The doctrine of ratione soli has survived in many jurisdictions to this day. Likewise, many jurisdictions still recognize the correlative ad coelum doctrine. India, for example, "views groundwater as chattel connected to the land, and allows the landowner ownership rights based on the ad coelum principle." However, some commentators note that some American jurisdictions have rejected the application of ratione soli to the ownership of wild animals because "it smacks of the hunting rights of the English landowning families who used it to make meatless meals for and poachers out of England's yeoman." For example, the Colorado Supreme Court stated in 1981 that "a landowner's property ratione soli is subject to 'lawful regulation.'"

== See also ==
- Keeble v. Hickeringill
- Pierson v. Post
- Roman law
- Rule of capture
- Territorial principle
