= Neal Wood =

American political historian

- Born: Neal Norman Wood; 10 September 1922; Los Angeles, California, US
- Died: 17 September 2003 (aged 81); Devon, England
- Spouse: Ellen Meiksins Wood (m. 1968)

Academic background
- Education: University of California, Berkeley
- Thesis: Communism and the British Intellectual (1958)

Academic work
- Discipline: Political science
- Sub-discipline: Political theory
- School or tradition: Marxism
- Institutions: University of California, Los Angeles; York University

Neal Norman Wood (September 10, 1922 – September 17, 2003) was an American-Canadian Marxist scholar of the history of political thought. He located political ideas within social relations, property forms, and popular struggles, writing on topics as variant as the British Communist Party, John Locke, Aristotle, Edmund Burke, and Augustine of Hippo.

== Biography ==
Born in Los Angeles on 10 September 1922, Wood volunteered for the Royal Air Force (RAF) before the United States entered the Second World War. After four years in the RAF, he was drafted into the US Air Force and served in Italy. After the war, the G.I. Bill helped him to study at the University of California, Berkeley (UC Berkeley), from which he graduated in 1951 with a degree in history. From 1955 to 1957, he did research at the University of Cambridge for his Doctor of Philosophy degree, which received from UC Berkeley. His doctoral thesis, Communism and the British Intellectual, was published as Communism and British Intellectuals in 1959.

Between 1958 and 1963, Wood taught at Columbia University. He then accepted an appointment at the University of California, Los Angeles before taking up, in 1966, a chair in political science at the newly established York University in Toronto, Ontario, Canada. He and his wife, Ellen Meiksins Wood, with whom he co-authored several studies, became Canadian citizens. He retired from York in 1988, and settled in England a decade later, where he died of cancer in Devon on 17 September 2003.

The Woods had one son, Cody Markwell Wood, who died suddenly in 1984. Cody had one daughter, Chantal Ferris, born in 1975, who currently resides in Canada.

His final book, a jeremiad against the direction of his country of origin entitled Tyranny in America: Capitalism and National Decay, appeared posthumously in 2004.

== Published works ==
- Communism and British Intellectuals, Columbia University Press, 1959.
- Class Ideology and Ancient Political Theory: Socrates, Plato, and Aristotle in Social Context, with Ellen Meiksins Wood, Blackwell, 1978.
- The Politics of Locke's Philosophy: A Social Study of "An Essay Concerning Human Understanding", University of California Press, 1983.
- John Locke and Agrarian Capitalism, University of California Press, 1984.
- Cicero's Social and Political Thought, University of California Press, 1988.
- Foundations of Political Economy: Some Early Tudor Views on State and Society, University of California Press, 1994.
- A Trumpet of Sedition: Political Theory and the Rise of Capitalism, with Ellen Meiksins Wood, New York University Press, 1997.
- Reflections on Political Theory: A Voice of Reason from the Past, Palgrave, 2002.
- Tyranny in America: Capitalism and National Decay, Verso, 2004.
