= Tarleton v McGawley =

Common law case on tortious interference

Tarleton v McGawley is a notable case in the law of torts. In the judgment, authored in 1793, the King's Bench imposed liability on a third party for physically attacking trading partners and causing the plaintiff to lose trade.

== Facts ==
The plaintiffs owned a ship—Bannister—a trading vessel lying off the coast of Cameroon in western Africa. A canoe carrying natives sailed to the ship to establish trade. While returning to shore, the people in the canoe were fired on by a cannon from a nearby ship: the Othello. Othello's master, the defendant, intended to deter natives from trading with the Bannister. Consequently, plaintiffs lost their trade.

Plaintiffs sued, and the case came before the King's Bench in England in 1793. The Bench held that the plaintiffs were entitled to recover from the defendant because they suffered economic harm due to the defendant's improper conduct.

== Significance and later developments ==
The case established the tort of intentional tortious interference with advantageous relations. Eugene Volokh has noted the case as an ancestor of tortious interference.

== See also ==
- Tort
- Tortious interference
