= DC Thomson & Co Ltd v Deakin =

- Court: Court of Appeal

Keywords
- Strike, economic tort

DC Thomson & Co Ltd v Deakin [1952] Ch 646 is a UK labour law case concerned with the right to strike and the law of tortious interference.

== Facts ==
The National Society of Operative Printers and Assistants (NATSOPA) wished to pressure on DC Thomson & Co Ltd to accept the union for collective bargaining. It persuaded TGWU drivers to disrupt its supply of paper.

== Judgment ==
Jenkins LJ accepted in principle the possibility of a trade union being liable to an employer if a strike meant that a commercial contract would be cut off. However on the facts, there was not enough for liability.

First … there may … be an actionable interference with contractual rights where other means of interference than persuasion or procurement or inducement, in the sense of influence of one kind or another brought to bear on the mind of the contract breaker to cause him to break his contract, are used by the interferer; but, secondly, that (apart from conspiracy to injure, which, as I have said, is not in question so far as this motion is concerned) acts of a third party lawful in themselves do not constitute an actionable interference with contractual rights merely because they bring about a breach of contract, even if they were done with the object and intention of bringing about such breach.

[...]

[On the elements of the tort...] first, that the person charged with actionable interference knew of the existence of the contract and intended to procure its breach; secondly, that the person so charged did definitely and unequivocally persuade, induce or procure the employees concerned to break their contracts of employment with the intent I have mentioned; thirdly, that the employees so persuaded, induced or procured did in fact break their contracts of employment; and, fourthly, that breach of the contract forming the alleged subject of interference ensued as a necessary consequence of the breaches by the employees concerned of their contracts of employment.

== Significance ==
The legal arguments adopted in this case are a leading example of the so-called "unified theory", now abandoned, which treats all forms of interference with contractual relations by unlawful means as the same overall form of wrong.

== See also ==
- United Kingdom labour law
