= Australian mining law =

Mining law

Australian mining law governs the exploration and extraction of minerals and petroleum in Australia. It differs substantially from the mining laws of other common law countries, the most important differences arising from the policy decision that the Crown should own all minerals.

== History of mining law ==
The first Australian mining laws were enacted in 1851. Before that, ownership of minerals and petroleum passed to those who were granted title to land by the colonial governors according to common law concepts, except the right to "Royal Mines" (the precious metals of gold and silver) which remained vested in the Crown by virtue of Royal prerogative. From 1855, colonial parliaments legislated for ownership of minerals to be retained by the Crown in future grants of freehold title. Thus, the situation developed where throughout Australia, the crown in right of the State owns nearly all the minerals.

== Legislation ==
In relation to minerals situated within state boundaries, first sight, the power to legislate for minerals remains with the states. However, despite the fact that the Constitution of Australia does not list minerals as an area over which the Federal Parliament has jurisdiction, a number of the Commonwealth Parliament's powers encompass matters relevant to mining operations and any legislation of the Commonwealth based upon these powers will override any inconsistent State legislation. As to Commonwealth jurisdiction over the Territories, the constitutional limitations regarding mining operations conducted within the States have no application in the Northern Territory, or other Australian territories.

Each of the States and Territories has its own legislation regulating the exploration for and production of onshore minerals. The Commonwealth has no onshore mining legislation which is applicable in the States or Territories.

As to offshore minerals, the Commonwealth has sovereignty in respect of the territorial sea, and sovereign rights in respect of both the continental shelf and the exclusive economic zone for the purpose of exploitation of their natural resources. Thus, the sovereignty over minerals of the States and the Northern Territory extends only to the low-water mark and it is the Commonwealth which is entitled under international law to exercise sovereignty over minerals under the territorial sea, within the exclusive economic zone and on the continental shelf. However, following an agreement negotiated between the Commonwealth Government and the States in 1979, the Commonwealth conferred power on the States and the Northern Territory to make laws for matters including mining operations in respect of the coastal waters and granted them proprietary rights to the seabed.

In addition, the Corporations Act 2001 and the Australian Stock Exchange Listing Rules contain special provisions governing the conduct and reporting requirements of mining companies.

== Ownership of minerals ==
According to the maxim "to whomsoever the soil belongs, he owns also to the sky and to the depths", there is a presumption that a land owner also owns all minerals on or beneath the surface of that land. The presumption is subject to the exception of the Royal metals. As early as the sixteenth century, the common law has held that all gold and silver, whether situated on public or private land, has been owned by the Crown. This Royal prerogative has also been applied in Australia, by both common law and legislation.

However, the principle of the owner of land owning the minerals within it has been virtually abolished by statute in Australia. The general rule is that the Crown (in right of the State) owns all minerals. This has been implemented by statute; initially by enacting that all future grants of land must contain a reservation to the Crown of all minerals. Now, all new grants of freehold titles in Australia have provided that all minerals were reserved to the Crown.

In respect of titles granted prior to the legislation, the owner of the land retained ownership of the minerals (except the Royal metals of gold and silver). That owner may grant a profit à prendre to enter and take minerals.

Crown ownership of minerals has been made universal in Victoria and South Australia by legislative expropriation of all minerals. In Tasmania and New South Wales, this approach of legislative expropriation has been applied on a selective basis (in Tasmania, for gold, silver, oil, hydrogen, helium and atomic substances, and, in New South Wales, for coal). The Crown, pursuant to statute, may grant various leases or licences to enter onto land and take minerals.

State ownership of minerals has had the important result that governments, rather than private landholders, determine the legal regimes governing mineral exploration and production.

== Ratified agreements ==
Large mining operations are likely to be regulated by a ratified agreement, sometimes also called a "state agreement", an "agreement act", a "franchise agreement", a "government agreement" or a "special agreement act". The basis of such an agreement is that the State contracts with the miner in the form of a written agreement which is ratified by a statute of that State or Territory Parliament. This ratification ensures that the provisions of the negotiated agreement have legislative effect and override any inconsistent provisions under the general mining legislation or any other statutes of that State or Territory. Ratified agreements have been used throughout Australia to establish large, export-oriented mining projects since the 1950s. They have been most extensively used in West Australia, where a high proportion of large mining projects continue to operate under such arrangements.

== See also ==
- Energy law
- Warden's court
- Tribute mining
