= Air rights =

Type of real estate ownership right

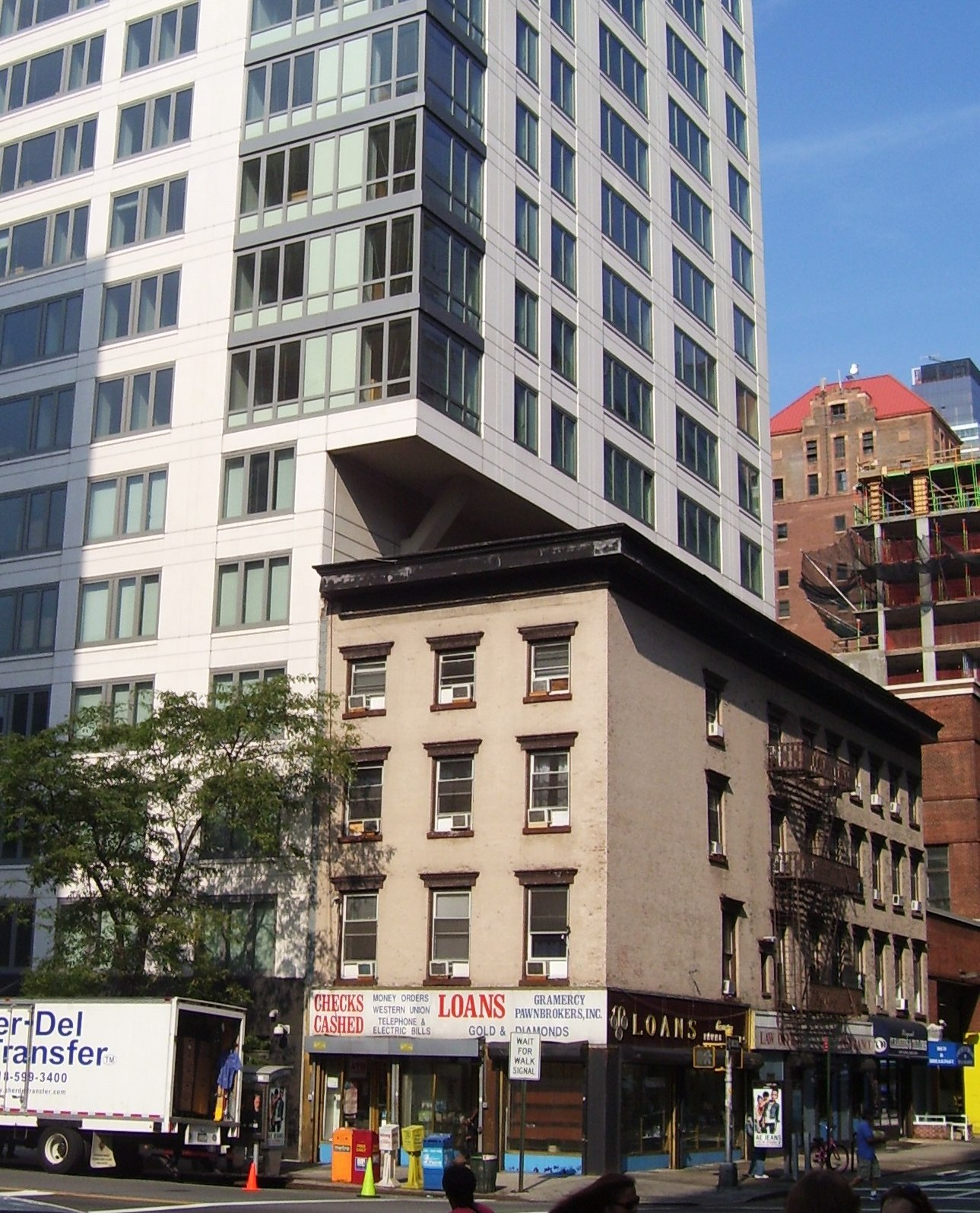
An example of air rights transfer between properties: a high-rise building extends over a four-story building in New York City.

In real estate, air rights are the property interest in the "space" above the Earth's surface. Generally speaking, owning or renting land or a building includes the right to use and build in the space above the land without interference by others.

This legal concept is encoded in the Latin phrase Cuius est solum, eius est usque ad coelum et ad inferos ("Whoever owns the soil, it is theirs up to Heaven and down to Hell."), which appears in medieval Roman law and is credited to 13th-century glossator Accursius; it was notably popularized in common law in Commentaries on the Laws of England (1766) by William Blackstone; see origins of phrase for details. In the 20th century, the splitting of air-rights from the underlying property became an important issue for property development, particularly for skyscrapers in some crowded cities.

== Air travel ==
Property rights defined by points on the ground once extended indefinitely upward. This notion remained unchallenged before air travel became popular in the early 20th century. To promote air transport, legislators established a public easement for transit at high altitudes, regardless of real estate ownership.

New technologies have again raised questions about ownership of "space" and the upward bounds of national sovereignty. With the advent of space travel above Earth's atmosphere, the height at which national sovereignty extends and therefore nations can regulate transit is often debated.

=== United States ===
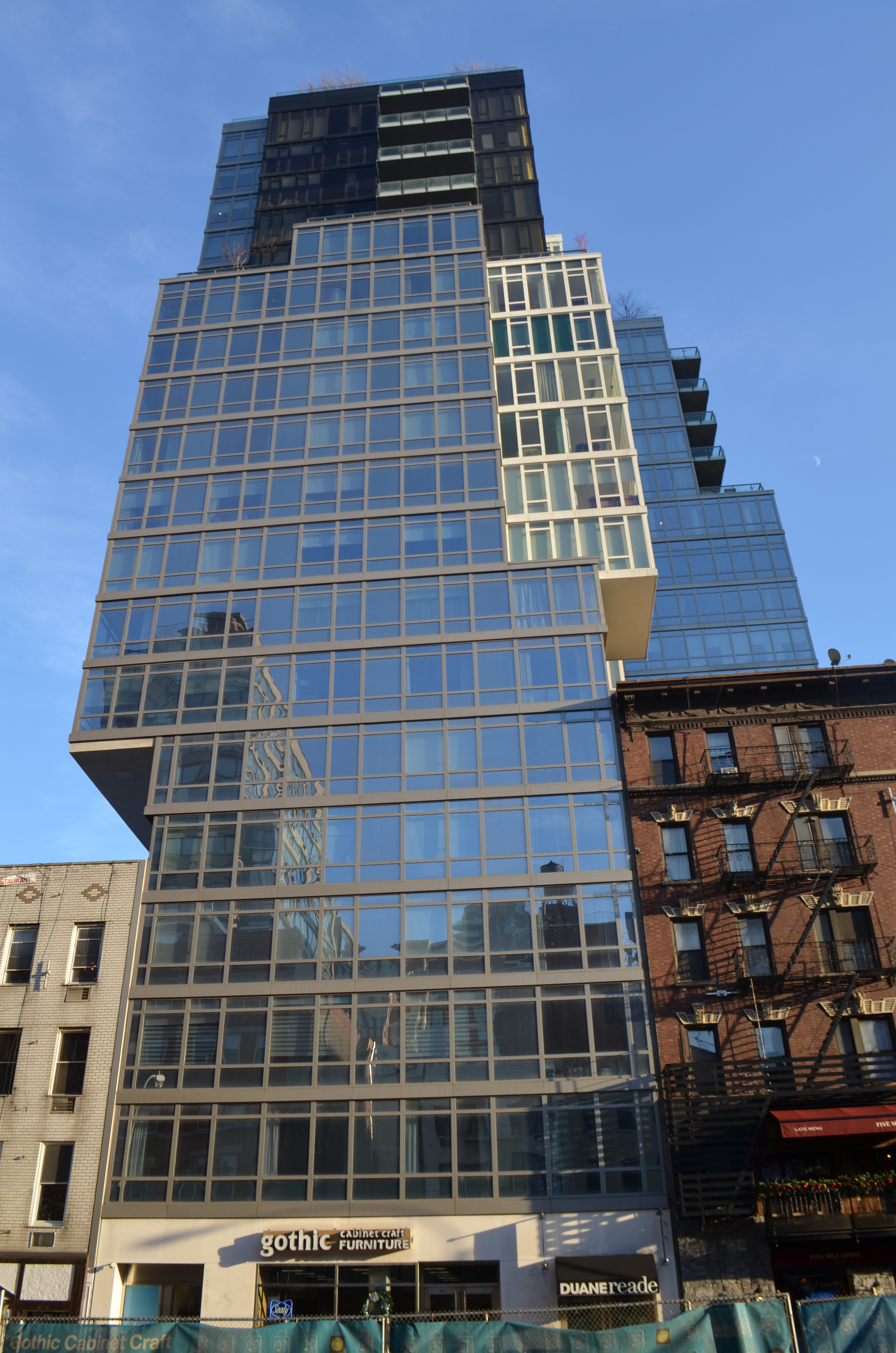
A building is cantilevered over two other buildings in New York City

In the United States, the Federal Aviation Administration (FAA) has the sole authority to regulate all "navigable airspace" exclusively determining the rules and requirements for its use. Specifically, the Federal Aviation Act provides that: "The United States Government has exclusive sovereignty of airspace of the United States" and "A citizen of the United States has a public right of transit through the navigable airspace." The "navigable airspace" in which the public has a right of transit has been defined as "the airspace at or above the minimum altitudes of flight that includes the airspace needed to ensure safety in the takeoff and landing of aircraft."

The exact altitude(s) at which the airspace over private land can become subject to "substantial impairment" is often debated. Case law in the past has used the height of 500 ft (150 m) in urban or suburban areas, and 360 ft (110 m) above the surface or tallest structure in rural areas as the demarcation of where impairment of property rights can occur. At those times, this constituted the limits of "navigable airspace". However, the bulk of more recent decisions, which take precedent, hold that taking can occur regardless of if the flight occurred within navigable airspace or not and only impairment of property need be considered. This is especially important as some aircraft (crewed and uncrewed) now have no minimum flight altitudes making virtually all airspace "navigable".

Financial compensation is owed property owners when the use of their property is substantially impaired by the federal government or by state government, or by the aerial trespasser.

Congress has provided authority for the FAA to provide funds to purchase property interests in airspace (navigation easements) near airports to accommodate planes taking off and landing.

The advent of low-cost unmanned aerial vehicles (also called drones) in the 2000s re-raised legal questions regarding whose permission is required to fly at low altitudes: the landowner, the FAA, or both. There has never been a direct challenge to the federal government's vesting of the right for citizens to travel through navigable airspace. As such, the status quo is only permission from the FAA (through regulation) is required. However, existing property rights over private property still allow for civil claims of taking when property use is "substantially impaired" by the use of the airspace. The FAA has also reiterated that it has sole authority to regulate this right.

The owner of the land has the exclusive development rights in the 'space' above their land. Under common law, building a 'hangover' that breaks the vertical plane of a neighbor's property is a trespass and the property owner has the right to remove the offending structure. The airspace is property and retains developmental rights which can be sold or transferred. Thus in a dense downtown area, each building owner in the area may have the right to thirty-five stories of airspace above their own property. In one possible scenario, owners of an older building of only three stories high could make a great deal of money by selling their building and allowing a thirty-five-story skyscraper to be built in its place. In a different scenario, a skyscraper developer may purchase the unused airspace from an adjacent landowner in order to develop a broader building. In November 2005, Christ Church in New York sold its vertical development rights for a record $430 per square foot, making more than $30 million on the sale for the right to build in the space over its building.

=== United Kingdom ===
Airspace around a property in most of the United Kingdom is divided into the "lower stratum" and "upper stratum". The lower stratum is the area around and above a property that the owner can expect to reasonably enjoy - in other words, interference by others into this area is usually deemed an act of trespass. This can include overhanging trees or signage from a neighbouring property, or movement such as a crane swinging overhead. However the right to enjoy this airspace is not an automatic right to build into that space without planning permission.

The upper stratum is the space above which ordinary use and enjoyment by the property owner is reasonable, and is loosely defined in the Section 76 Civil Aviation Act 1982 as starting between 500 and 1,000 feet (150 and 300 m) above the roof level of the property. In England, Wales and Northern Ireland, property owners have no rights to the upper stratum, but in Scotland the rights are generally extended a coelo usque ad centrum (from the sky to the centre).

The sale of air rights in the UK is generally unusual but it is legal, and becoming increasingly common.

== Railroads and air rights ==
Railroads were the first companies to realize the potential of making money from their air rights. A good example of this is Grand Central Terminal in New York City, where William J. Wilgus, chief engineer of the New York Central and Hudson River Railroad, devised a plan to earn profit from air rights. At first, the railroad simply constructed a platform above the rail yards to allow for the construction of buildings overhead. By 1954, the railroad began to realize it could sell more air rights and Grand Central Terminal was proposed to be replaced by a 50-story tower. The MetLife Building came to be built next to the station, after public protest regarding the original plan to demolish the terminal. This approach has been used in Chicago since the construction of what is now Riverside Plaza in 1929, as well as Prudential Building in 1955 above the Illinois Central Railroad's station at Randolph Street. In 2017, to the west of the Chicago River, River Point and 150 North Riverside were built above tracks leading to Union Station.

Building on platforms over railroad tracks is still potentially very profitable. In the mid-2000s, New York's Metropolitan Transportation Authority (MTA) attempted to sell air rights to the New York Jets so that they could build the West Side Stadium over Manhattan's West Side Yard, near Penn Station, as part of the Hudson Yards Redevelopment. The Hudson Yards mega-development was eventually built over the rail yard. In Brooklyn, the Barclays Center and Pacific Park have been constructed over Atlantic Yards.

== Roads and air rights ==
Similar to railroads, builders of highways have proposed selling their air rights; Boston did this in connection with the Big Dig.

The city of Los Angeles funded a $100,000 feasibility study RFP in January 2007 to explore building a freeway cap park in Hollywood. The park would be built above US highway 101 and contain 24 acres (97,000 m^{2}) of new parkland.

== See also ==
- Ancient lights (legal doctrine)
- Burlesque—a 2010 American film in which air rights play significant part
- Chicago Convention on International Civil Aviation
- Countryside and Rights of Way Act 2000 (in the UK)
- Crown land (see "logging and mineral rights" under Canada)
- Easement ("the right of use over the real property of another")
- Freedom to roam
- Land rights
- Littoral rights: rights to ocean and beach in front of property
- Prior appropriation water rights
- Riparian water rights: rights to river water in front of property
- Subsurface rights: rights to oil or minerals under property
- Transferable development rights
- United States v. Causby
