= Original appropriation =

Property ownership concept

Original appropriation is a process by which previously unowned natural resources, particularly land, become the property of a person or group of persons. The term is widely used in economics in this sense. In certain cases, it proceeds under very specifically defined forms, such as driving stakes or other such markers into the land claimed, which form gave rise to the term "staking a claim." "Squatter's rights" are another form of appropriation, but are usually asserted against land to which ownership rights of another party have been recognized. In legal regimes recognizing such acquisition of property, the ownership of duly appropriated holdings enjoys such protections as the law provides for ownership of property in general.

Under some systems using this method of acquiring ownership of land, it is permitted to employ violence in defending the duly appropriated holding against encroachment against the ownership or usage claims, again usually according to specifically defined forms including warnings to the encroaching party, exhaustion or unavailability of duly constituted law-enforcement resources, etc.

Libertarianism and other property-rights-oriented ideologies define appropriation as requiring the "mixing" of the would-be owner's labor with the land claimed. A prime example of such mixing is farming, although various extractive activities such as mining, and the grazing of herds are often recognized. Personal, physical residence is often recognized after some minimum documented continuous period of time, as is built structures on the land whose ownership has not previously been recognized by the authority whose recognition is sought.

Appropriation through use can apply to resources other than the exclusive right to use of the surface of the land. As mentioned, mineral rights are recognized under various conditions, as are riparian rights. Appropriation can apply to inland waters within a certain distance of appropriated land, and even to the liquid water in a reservoir, lake, or stream. Appropriation has been applied under common law to resources as disparate as radio broadcast frequencies and Internet Web site names, but many such claims have been overturned through legislated arrangements mandating other standards for the assignment of ownership rights in such things.

Appropriation as a means of acquiring property is related to the schools of thought that call for ongoing use as a condition of continued ownership, as is the case in some regimes with trademarks, but it applies to initial ownership.

== Theory ==
=== Labor theory ===
The labor theory of property is a theory of that holds that property originally comes about by the exertion of labor upon natural resources. According to this view, when an individual mixes their labor with unowned land or objects found in nature, they acquire a legitimate claim to ownership over the resulting product. This theory is most famously associated with the English philosopher John Locke, who argued in his Second Treatise of Government that property rights based on the labor theory of property.

However, the labor theory of property has also been subject to significant criticism. Critics have questioned whether mixing labor with a resource should necessarily confer ownership, and whether such a theory can account for complex economic systems or justly resolve disputes over land and resources that have long histories of contested ownership. Despite this, the theory continues to be influential in discussions of property rights, natural law, and political philosophy.

=== First possession theory ===
The "first possession" theory of property holds that ownership of something is justified simply by someone seizing it before someone else does. This contrasts with the labor theory of property where something may become property only by applying productive labor to it, i.e. by making something out of the materials of nature.

==== Real property ====
Pedis possessio is a legal phrase in common law used to describe walking on a property to establish ownership; this concept involves the establishment of first possession of land. By walking on a property and defining its bounds, possession is established. Legal dictionaries put forth this definition.

Pedis possessio has been described as the actual possession of land within bounds set forth by the need of a mine claimant and operator to improve and work a claim for its mineral value.

Violation of set boundaries are avoided and violence prevented by the establishment of title using the concept of pedis possessio.

==== Hunting results ====
In the case of Pierson v. Post, where labor theory and first possession theory were in conflict, the final verdict was that the one who caught the fox owned it.

== See also ==
- Homestead principle
- Eminent domain
- Nationalization
- Georgist theory of property
- Labor theory of property
- Utilitarian theory of property
- Adverse possession
- Structural encroachment
- Trespass
- Pierson v. Post
