= United States v. Causby =

- Supreme Court of the United States

Argued May 1, 1946 Decided May 27, 1946
- Full case name: United States v. Causby
- Citations: 328 U.S. 256 (more) 66 S. Ct. 1062; 90 L. Ed. 1206

Case history
- Prior: 104 Ct. Cls. 342, 60 F. Supp. 751, reversed and remanded.

Holding
- A landowner's domain includes the lower altitude airspace, but that property does not extend "ad coelum" (indefinitely upward).

Court membership
- Chief Justice vacant Associate Justices Hugo Black · Stanley F. Reed; Felix Frankfurter · William O. Douglas; Frank Murphy · Robert H. Jackson; Wiley B. Rutledge · Harold H. Burton

Case opinions
- Majority: Douglas, joined by Reed, Frankfurter, Murphy, Rutledge
- Dissent: Black, Burton
- Jackson took no part in the consideration or decision of the case.

United States v. Causby, 328 U.S. 256 (1946), was a landmark United States Supreme Court decision related to ownership of airspace above private property. The United States government claimed a public right to fly over Thomas Lee Causby's farm located near an airport in Greensboro, North Carolina. Causby argued that the government's low-altitude flights entitled him to just compensation under the Takings Clause of the Fifth Amendment.

The Court held that a taking had occurred, but nullified the common law doctrine that ownership of property extended indefinitely upward. The court also affirmed that navigable airspace was public domain and held that flights which are so low and frequent as to be a direct and immediate interference with the enjoyment and use of real property constitute a taking. Much of the holding has been superseded by more recent cases and changes in the regulations relied upon.

== Background ==
Thomas Lee Causby was a land owner less than a half mile from the end of the runway of Lindley Field, an airstrip in Greensboro, North Carolina. During World War II, the United States military flew planes into the airstrip and as low as 83 feet (25 m) above Causby's Farm thereby interfering with the productive use of the Causby farm. Vibrations and sounds caused by the aircraft prevented use of property as a chicken farm, killing more than 150 chickens.

The Court of Claims ruled that a land owner's domain includes the airspace above it, and ruled that Causby was entitled to just compensation for the government having 'Taken' his property by conducting overflights through the airspace above his property.

The United States appealed this ruling against them, and the Supreme Court agreed to review the case, regarding the contradiction between the common laws of property ownership (without any height limit) against the assertion of a federal claim that flights are made within the navigable airspace without any physical invasion of the property of the landowners, there has been no taking of property.

== Holding ==
The Court recognized that a claim of property ownership indefinitely upward "has no place in the modern world." effectively nullifying the common law ad coelum doctrine.

The Court affirmed the right to of transit through navigable airspace:

"The air above the minimum safe altitude of flight prescribed by the Civil Aeronautics Authority is a public highway and part of the public domain, as declared by Congress in the Air Commerce Act of 1926, as amended by the Civil Aeronautics Act of 1938."

However, the Court held that the flights occurred outside of navigable airspace:

"the flights in question were not within the navigable airspace which Congress placed within the public domain. If any airspace needed for landing or taking off were included, flights which were so close to the land as to render it uninhabitable would be immune. But the United States concedes, as we have said, that, in that event, there would be a taking."

Ultimately the Court agreed with the Court of Claims and held that a taking had occurred because flight occurred outside of navigable airspace :

"there was a diminution in value of the property, and that the frequent, low-level flights were the direct and immediate cause. We agree with the Court of Claims that a servitude has been imposed upon the land."

This meant that the government conducting such low-level flights constituted a "taking" of Causby's property, and under the Constitution's takings clause, he was owed compensation.

On remand, the Court of Claims was tasked with defining the value of the "property interests" that had been taken from Causby by flyovers. Because the lowest plane flew at 83 feet (25 m), the tallest object on Causby's land was 65 feet (20 m) tall, and flights 300 feet (91 m) above the tallest terrain were considered within the public easement declared by Congress, the Court needed to determine the value owed the farmer for public use of his airspace between 83 and 365 feet (25 and 111 m). The Court of Claims did not need to compensate the farmer for use below 83 feet (25 m), because the planes did not fly below that height. Compensation was owed based on the occupancy of the property, and not damage to chickens.

=== Dissent ===
Justice Black, joined by Justice Burton, dissented with the decision. Black wrote that the majority opinion created:

... "an opening wedge for an unwarranted judicial interference with the power of Congress to develop solutions for new and vital national problems."

The minority opinion was predicated on interference with private property being resolved at the State Court level through tort law, rather than in a federal court with constitutional jurisdiction. However, the U.S. government filed its appeal based upon an assertion of ownership to low altitude airspace, which the court roundly rejected, and as a case filed by the federal government it automatically became a federal court issue.

The dissenting opinion would have forced the issue of compensation into State court. The principle on which the dissent was based was later rejected in a 1962 ruling that established that all federal "takings" claims need to be litigated in a federal court with jurisdiction over U.S. Constitutional issues.

== Changes to reliance and precedent ==
In determining that the flights had occurred outside of "navigable airspace", the Court relied on the definition of navigable airspace to reach a decision. At the time, this was defined as "airspace above the minimum safe altitudes of flight prescribed by the Civil Aeronautics Authority." However, shortly after this decision, Congress redefined navigable airspace to include "airspace needed to ensure safety in the takeoff and landing of aircraft."

Currently, some aircraft, such as helicopters, balloons, and ultralights, have no minimum safe altitudes.

The question of whether takings can occur within navigable airspace has been addressed in later cases, most notably in Griggs v. County of Allegheny and Branning v. United States. The former case held that aircraft noise from operations within navigable airspace did amount to a taking.

== See also ==
- Air rights
- Cuius est solum, eius est usque ad coelum et ad inferos
- Energy law
- List of notable United States Supreme Court cases
- List of United States Supreme Court cases, volume 328
- Property law
- Takings clause
