= The Origin of Capitalism =

1999 book by Ellen Meiksins Wood

- Author: Ellen Meiksins Wood
- Language: English
- Subject: History of capitalism
- Publisher: Monthly Review Press
- Publication date: 1999
- Publication place: United States
- Pages: vii, 138
- ISBN: 978-1-58367-007-1
- Dewey Decimal: 330.12/2/09
- LC Class: HB501 .W915

The Origin of Capitalism is a 1999 book on history and political economy, specifically the history of capitalism, by the political theorist Ellen Meiksins Wood, written from the perspective of political Marxism. It was reviewed as an "Outstanding Academic Book" by Michael Perelman.

== Summary ==
The book is divided into three sections. The following summary is based on the second edition (though some references are to the first).

Wood's Marxist approach originates from Karl Marx's critique of political economy in his works Das Kapital and Grundrisse. In the capitalist form of society, human labor power is for sale in the market as one of many commodities. Goods and services, including those regarding the most basic necessities of life, are produced for profitable exchange. All the actors in a such system are driven by competition and profit-maximization. However, the study presents capitalists' appropriation of "workers' surplus labor without coercion" by using the market to set rates of compensation both for wages and for appropriation as the most distinctive and historically important feature of capitalism. Thus it argues that the origin of capitalism lies fundamentally in social property relations rather than in trade and commerce.

Wood argues that past historians have tended to see capitalism as a natural and even inevitable human behaviour, which came into being when barriers to trade and commerce were removed: essentially, in their understanding, people were waiting for the opportunity to become capitalists. Wood argues rather that capitalism did not come about until a set of unique historical circumstances compelled people to.

=== Part I, 'Histories of the Transition' ===
In part I, Wood surveys past work on the transition to capitalism. She sketches how Adam Smith, Max Weber, Fernand Braudel, and Henri Pirenne assumed that capitalism naturally arises from trade, commerce, and urbanisation once city-dwellers have accumulated enough primitive capital to be able to reinvest it in production. However, she also finds that even commentators who were critical of this account tend to argue that the transition to capitalism entailed farmers seizing new opportunities to switch from subsistence to commodity production as the constraints of feudalism were loosened. Examples include Karl Marx himself, Karl Polanyi, Paul Sweezy, Maurice Dobb, Rodney Hilton, and Perry Anderson. This suggests that capitalism is a natural and inevitable behaviour, waiting for its opportunity, rather than historically unusual and specific. Building particularly on the arguments made in the Brenner Debate and on the work of E. P. Thompson, Wood argues that 'we need a form of history that brings this specificity into sharp relief'.

=== Part II, 'The Origin of Capitalism' ===
In part II, Wood argues that capitalism emerged in the unique conditions of late medieval and early modern English agrarian society, basing her argument firmly on Robert Brenner's ‘Agrarian Class Structure and Economic Development in Pre-Industrial Europe’. She argues that commerce is not equivalent to capitalism and does not produce it because 'the dominant principle of trade everywhere was not surplus value derived from production but "profit on alienation", "buying cheap and selling dear" ': that is, although trade involves the seeking of profits, it does not in itself affect how goods are produced. Wood argues that polities which flourished from trade such as medieval Florence and the early-modern Dutch Republic that did not become capitalist are not examples of a 'failed transition', but rather examples of how trade and urbanisation has flourished widely in human history without capitalism developing. She likewise argues that various past societies, such as early modern France, had peasantries with ample opportunity to enter into commercial production, which, however, did not take this opportunity. Thus Wood concludes that capitalism must have arisen from changing imperatives in fundamental relations of production.

Wood sees these unique circumstances arising in late medieval and early-modern England (particularly the south-east). In the wake of the Norman Conquest, the English state was unusually centralised. This gave aristocrats relatively limited powers to extract wealth directly from their feudal underlings through political means (not least the threat of violence). England's centralisation also meant that an unusual number of English farmers were not peasants (with their own land and thus direct access to subsistence) but tenants (renting their land). These circumstances produced a market in leases. Landlords, lacking other ways to extract wealth, were incentivised to rent to those tenants who could pay the most, while tenants, lacking security of tenure, were incentivised to farm as productively as possible to be able to win leases in a competitive market. This led to a cascade of effects whereby successful tenant farmers became agrarian capitalists; unsuccessful ones became wage-labourers, required to sell their labour in order to live; and landlords promoted the privatisation and renting out of common land, not least through the enclosures. 'It was not merchants or manufacturers who drove the process that propelled the early development of capitalism. The transformation of social property relations was firmly rooted in the countryside, and the transformation of England's trade and industry was result more than cause of England's transition to capitalism'.

=== Part III, 'Agrarian Capitalism and Beyond' ===
In part III, Wood sketches how industrial capitalism developed from its agrarian English origins. She argues that the end of subsistence farming produced a large population which needed both to sell its labour and to buy basic necessities of life, creating a mass consumer market quite different from the markets for luxury goods that characterised non-capitalist commerce. This mass market underpinned the development of mass production.

Wood argues that England's rising productivity slowly but inevitably forced competing economies to enter capitalist modes of production: although the development of capitalism was a chance event, it set in motion a transition that would become global. She argues that English capitalism did not cause England's imperialism, noting that neighbouring non-capitalist economies like Spain and France also built overseas empires. She does find, however, that English capitalism produced a distinctive kind of imperialism. Rather than ruling purely through 'extra-economic' methods of exerting power (such as force), England exported its model of social property relations to its colonies, providing powerful economic imperatives for people to adopt capitalism. English imperialism also drew on the nascent capitalist ideology of thinkers such as Thomas More, Sir John Davies, John Locke, and William Petty to justify taking the land of peoples who were thought not to be making sufficiently productive use of it.

Wood sketches the reliance of capitalism on the political structures of the nation-state (particularly its protection of private property), and emphasises that the humane and universalist ideas of the Enlightenment emerged in the still non-capitalist France of the eighteenth century, setting Enlightenment ideas in contrast to capitalist ideologies. Finally, she emphasises that if capitalism is a historically specific and unusual development, it is not inevitable or the only way that humans might organise themselves.

== Editions ==
The book was originally published in 1999 by Monthly Review Press, and then a revised edition was published in 2002 by Verso Books, with the subtitle "A Longer View". A reprint appeared in 2013 and again in 2017.

- Wood, Ellen Meiksins (1999) The Origin of Capitalism, Monthly Review Press, 1999. ISBN 1-58367-000-9, 120 pp.
- Wood, Ellen Meiksins (2002) The Origin of Capitalism: A Longer View, Verso Books, 2002. ISBN 978-1-85984-392-5, 213 pp.
- Wood, Ellen Meiksins (2013) The Origin of Capitalism: A Longer View, Aakar Books, 2013. ISBN 978-93-5002-241-2, 224 pp.
- Wood, Ellen Meiksins (2017) The Origin of Capitalism: A Longer View, Verso Books, 2017. ISBN 978-1-78663-068-1, 213 pp.

== Reviews ==
Reviews include:

- Geoff Kennedy, Labour / Le Travail, Vol. 44 (Fall, 1999), pp. 303–305, https://www.jstor.org/stable/25149026
- Richard Biernacki, Contemporary Sociology, Vol. 29, No. 4 (Jul., 2000), pp. 638–639, https://www.jstor.org/stable/2654574
- Kevin R. Cox, Annals of the Association of American Geographers, Vol. 91, No. 1 (Mar., 2001), pp. 220–222, https://www.jstor.org/stable/3651208
- Michael Perelman's review published in Choice: Current Reviews for Academic Libraries, ( sections: Social & Behavioral Sciences \ Economics ) October 1999, n. 37
- Review in The Economic Journal Volume 109 Issue 459, Pages 867 - 876 Published Online: 28 Jun 2008
