= Vi et armis =

In common law, trespass vi et armis (Latin for "by force and arms") was a tort in which the plaintiff would allege in a pleading that an act was "immediately injurious to another's property, and therefore necessarily accompanied by some degree of force; and by special action on the case, where the act is in itself indifferent and the injury only consequential, and therefore arising without any breach of the peace." Thus it was "immaterial whether the injury was committed willfully or not".

In Taylor v. Rainbow 2 Hen & M. 423 (1808), the defendant negligently discharged a firearm in a public place and caused the loss of the plaintiff's leg. The defendant was held to be liable for medical bills as well as lost earnings as a result of the disability. Thus, proof that the act or omission was unintended was no defense to an action of trespass vi et armis and the liable party would pay for all consequent damages.

Recovery for damages for a trespass vi et armis were limited only to the direct consequences of the act or omission causing the injury. For instance, the state of West Virginia reported that monetary loss for detention from business as an indirect result of the injury were not recoverable under an action for trespass vi et armis, but were available under the related action of trespass on the case, also known as an action ex delicto "against the wrong".

Trespass vi et armis was a precursor to many other forms of lawsuits at common law. The cause came to be formulaic and in many cases fictitious. For instance, a lawsuit against a defendant that had spoiled wine with salt water required an allegation that he had done so with bows and arrows. The ancient courts at common law developed trespass upon the case as an alternative pleading to causes of action which arose neither from force nor weapons. In modern times, the specific formalities of the distinction between the two have dropped in favor of notice pleading or code pleading and actions for negligence, battery, trespass to chattels, and conversion.

The related phrase of contra pacem regis, "against the King's peace", was necessarily not a required element of trespass vi et armis, although it was possible for both allegations to appear in a lawsuit when the intentional use of force or weapons breached the peace.
