= Ellen Meiksins Wood =

American-Canadian Marxist historian (1942–2016)

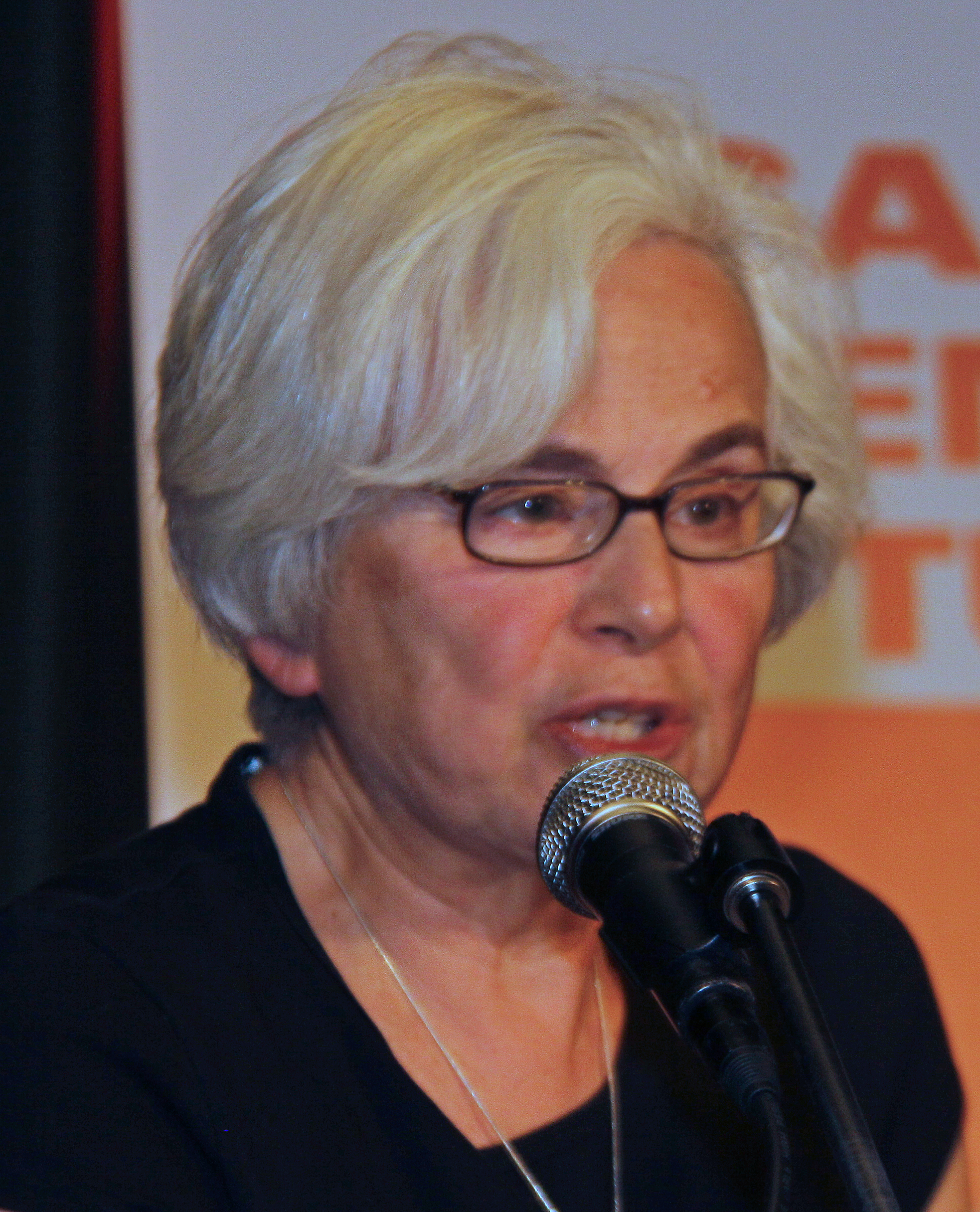
- Meiksins Wood in 2012
- Born: Ellen Meiksins; April 12, 1942; New York City, US
- Died: January 14, 2016 (aged 73); Ottawa, Ontario, Canada
- Other name: Ellen Wood
- Spouses: Neal Wood (m. 1968; died 2003); Ed Broadbent (m. 2014)

Academic background
- Education: University of California, Berkeley; University of California, Los Angeles
- Thesis: Epistemological Foundations of Individualism (1970)

Academic work
- Discipline: Political science
- Sub-discipline: Political theory
- School or tradition: Political Marxism
- Institutions: York University
- Notable works: The Retreat from Class (1986); The Origin of Capitalism (1999)
- Notable ideas: Political Marxism
- Influenced: Gáspár Miklós Tamás

Ellen Meiksins Wood (April 12, 1942 – January 14, 2016) was an American-Canadian Marxist historian, and one of the primary developers of the Marxist tendency known as political Marxism.

== Early life and education ==
Wood was born in New York City on April 12, 1942, as Ellen Meiksins one year after her parents, Latvian Jews active in the Bund, arrived in New York from Europe as political refugees. She was raised in the United States and Europe.

Wood received a Bachelor of Arts degree in Slavic languages from the University of California, Berkeley, in 1962 and subsequently entered the graduate program in political science at the University of California, Los Angeles, from which she received her Doctor of Philosophy degree in 1970.

== Career ==
From 1967 to 1996, Woods taught political science at Glendon College, York University, in Toronto, Ontario, Canada.

Along with Robert Brenner, Wood is credited as a founder of political Marxism, a rejection of orthodox Marxism which focusses on non-teleological approaches to historical change and capitalist development.

Meiksins Wood's many books and articles were sometimes written in collaboration with her first husband, Neal Wood. Her work has been translated into many languages, including Spanish, Portuguese, Italian, French, German, Romanian, Turkish, Chinese, Korean, and Japanese. Of these, The Retreat from Class received the Deutscher Memorial Prize in 1986. Wood served on the editorial committee of the British journal New Left Review between 1984 and 1993. From 1997 to 2000, Wood was an editor, along with Harry Magdoff and Paul Sweezy, of Monthly Review, the socialist magazine.

== Recognition ==
In 1996, she was inducted into the Royal Society of Canada, a marker of distinguished scholarship.

== Personal life, death and legacy ==
She first married Neal Wood (1922–2003). She and Neal divided their time between England and Canada until his death in 2003.

In 2014, she married Ed Broadbent, former leader of the New Democratic Party of Canada, with whom she lived in Ottawa and London for six years until her death from cancer at the age of 73 on January 14, 2016.

In 2017, the Broadbent Institute established the Ellen Meiksins Wood Prize and Lecture, awarded annually in her honour. The first prize was awarded in 2018.

== Selected works ==
- Wood, Ellen Meiksins (1972). Mind and Politics: An Approach to the Meaning of Liberal and Socialist Individualism. Berkeley: University of California Press.
- Wood, Ellen Meiksins (1978). Class Ideology and Ancient Political Theory: Socrates, Plato, and Aristotle in Social Context. Oxford: Blackwell.
- Wood, Ellen Meiksins (1986). The Retreat from Class: A New 'True' Socialism. London; New York: Verso; Schocken Books.
- Wood, Ellen Meiksins (1991). The Pristine Culture of Capitalism: A Historical Essay on Old Regimes and Modern States. London; New York: Verso.
- Wood, Ellen Meiksins (1995). Democracy Against Capitalism: Renewing Historical Materialism. Cambridge: Cambridge University Press.
- Wood, Ellen Meiksins (1997). A Trumpet of Sedition: Political Theory and the Rise of Capitalism, 1509–1688. London; New York: Pluto Press; NYU Press.
- Wood, Ellen Meiksins (1997). Peasant‑Citizen and Slave: The Foundations of Athenian Democracy. London; New York: Verso.
- Wood, Ellen Meiksins (1999). The Origin of Capitalism. New York: Monthly Review Press.
- Wood, Ellen Meiksins (2002). The Origin of Capitalism: A Longer View. London; New York: Verso Books.
- Wood, Ellen Meiksins (2003). Empire of Capital. London; New York: Verso.
- Wood, Ellen Meiksins (2008). Citizens to Lords: A Social History of Western Political Thought from Antiquity to the Middle Ages. London; New York: Verso.
- Wood, Ellen Meiksins (2012). Liberty & Property: A Social History of Western Political Thought from the Renaissance to Enlightenment. London; New York: Verso.

== See also ==
- Brenner debate
- The Origin of Capitalism

Awards
Preceded by Robert Brenner	Deutscher Memorial Prize; 1986	Succeeded by Teodor Shanin
