= Trespass on the case =

Tort in English common law

The writs of trespass and trespass on the case are the two catchall torts from English common law, the former involving trespass against the person, the latter involving trespass against anything else which may be actionable. The writ is also known in modern times as action on the case and can be sought for any action that may be considered as a tort but is yet to be an established category.

== Emergence of the writ of trespass ==
Trespass and trespass on the case, or "case", began as personal remedies in the royal courts in London in the 13th century. These early forms of trespass reflected a wide range of wrongs.

In 1278, however, the Statute of Gloucester was enacted. This limited actions in the royal courts to property damage worth above 40 shillings, maims, beatings or wounds. Soon after this Statute was enacted, writs of trespass appeared in a stereotyped form alleging "force and arms", or "vi et armis". Trespass writs alleging force and arms became known simply as trespass.

Some of the cases brought in vi et armis form probably did not involve force and arms at all and could be regarded as fictions.

An example is Rattlesdene v Grunestone in 1317 on the adulteration of wine with salt water. The form of the writ, stated however, that the defendants "with force and arms, namely with swords and bows and arrows, drew off a great part of the wine from the aforesaid tun and instead of the wine so drawn off they filled the tun with salt water so that all the aforesaid wine was destroyed".

== Emergence of the writ of trespass on the case ==
By the 1350s, writs of trespass could be litigated in the royal courts only if they alleged "force and arms". That was, however, largely a problem of procedure; some sections of the royal courts were more liberal than others in that respect. In particular, procedure under the King's Bench was less strict than procedure by writ in the Court of Common Pleas. Several cases were brought by a procedure of Bill into the King's Bench which did not allege force and arms between the 1340s and 1360s. In the Humber Ferry Case (1348), a horse was lost while being ferried across the Humber, and no force of arms was alleged.

The turning point in the creation of "honest" writs of Case was Waldon v Mareschal (1369). It was alleged that the defendant had negligently treated the plaintiff's horse. The Common Pleas accepted that in such a situation, an allegation of force and arms in a writ would not be appropriate. By the 1390s, actions on the case were common.

== See also ==
- Pierson v. Post, a Supreme Court of New York case from 1805 dealing with Trespass to case.
- Keeble v Hickeringill
- English tort law
