= Keeble v Hickeringill =

17th century english law about wild animals

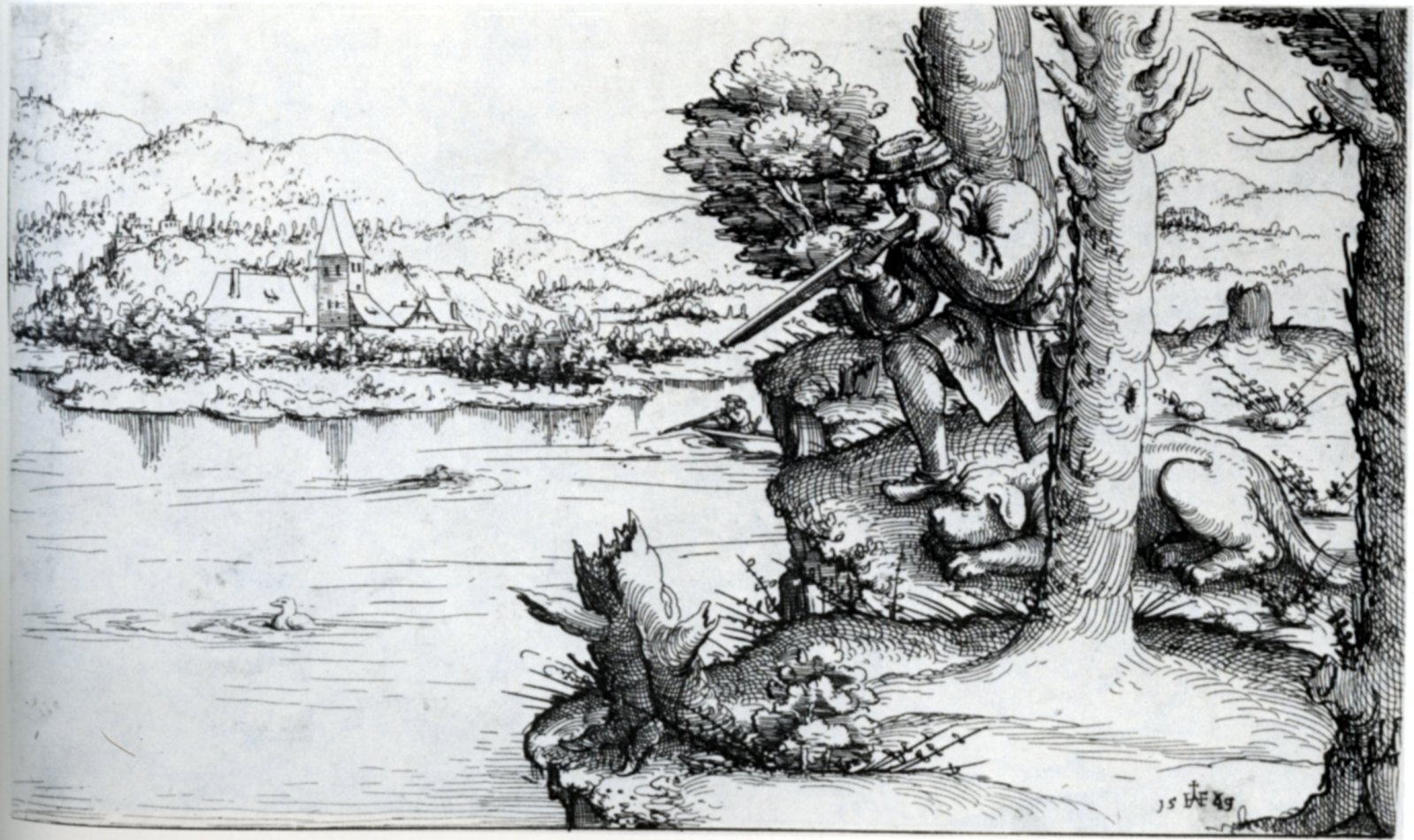
- Duck hunting
- Court: Queen's Bench
- Decided: 1707
- Citation: (1707) 11 East 574; 103 ER 1127

Case history
- Prior action: Plaintiff won £20 at trial

Court membership
- Judge sitting: Holt, C.J.

Keeble v Hickeringill (1707) 103 ER 1127 is a famous English property law and tort law case about rights to wild animals.

== Facts ==
Plaintiff Samuel Keeble owned property called Minott's Meadow, which contained an artificial pond, known as a decoy pond, outfitted with nets and channels in a manner used to catch large numbers of commercially viable ducks. Tame ducks were used to lure their wild counterparts into the decoy.

On three occasions, defendant Edmund Hickeringill, while on his own land, discharged firearms toward Keeble's pond in order to scare away the ducks.

== Judgment ==
Chief Justice Holt sustained the action of trespass on the case, because every person has the right to put his property to use for his own pleasure and profit. If Hickeringill had built a decoy on his own land near Keeble's meadow to draw away ducks (which, in fact, he had done previous to the construction of Keeble's own decoy and may have lent some cause as to Hickeringill's harassing actions), no action could be taken, because Hickeringill would have just as much right to set up a decoy on his own property as Keeble does on his. But, Hickeringill actively disturbed the ducks on Keeble's land, thereby causing damages in that,

he that hinders another in his trade or livelihood is liable.

Furthermore, Keeble had gone through the expense of setting up the decoy and nets, and to allow Hickeringill to disturb the profitable use of the land was bad for commerce. When a person hinders another's use of his own property for profit, it is actionable, even if there is no physical trespassing. Thus, Justice Holt concluded that

in short, that which is the true reason for this action is not brought to recover damage for the loss of the fowl, but for the disturbance.

On appeal, made by Hickeringill the verdict was re-affirmed without any change. Keeble won a verdict of £20.

In the later House of Lords case of Allen v Flood, the Lords held that Keeble v Hickeringill was just a nuisance case, and not an economic torts case.

== See also ==
- Pierson v. Post
- Ghen v. Rich
- Ratione soli
