= Rick Smith (environmentalist) =

Canadian author, environmentalist and non-profit leader

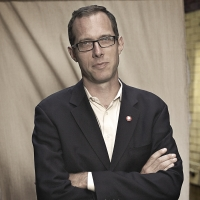
- Rick Smith in November 2012 Environmental Defence Canada
- Born: 1968 (age 57–58); Montreal, Quebec, Canada

Rick Smith (born 1968) is a Canadian author, environmentalist and non-profit leader. He is currently the President of the Canadian Climate Institute. Smith became President in 2021.

== Early life and education ==
Smith was born in Montreal, Quebec, and attended high school in Richmond Hill, Ontario.

He received his Ph.D. in biology in 1999 from the University of Guelph. His research, completed in cooperation with the Cree community of Whapmagoostui, in Nunavik, northern Quebec, focused on a unique population of freshwater harbor seal. Smith's work led to the population's listing as “endangered” under Canada's Species At Risk Act and IUCN Red List of Threatened Species. The need for enhanced protection of this population was one of the key factors in the creation of Tusujuq National Park – the largest protected area in eastern North America – in 2012.

== Career ==
From 1996 to 2002, Smith was Executive Director of the International Fund for Animal Welfare’s (IFAW) Canadian office and a leader in the campaign to create Canada's federal Species At Risk Act. In 2001, he was simultaneously IFAW's UK Director and led the organization's efforts in the UK and EU parliaments.

In 2003, Smith became Jack Layton’s first Chief of Staff upon Layton's election as leader of the federal New Democratic Party. He resigned over controversy within the party related to his previous environmental work.

As Executive Director of Environmental Defence Canada between 2003 and 2012, Smith was an early proponent of an environmentalism rooted in new, sustainable, economic models. He was a key proponent of the Ontario Greenbelt and the Ontario Green Energy Act and a founding Director of the Greenbelt Foundation. Smith led the efforts to create Canada’s modernized Consumer Product Safety Act and Chemicals Management Plan, which resulted in Canada becoming the first nation in the world to ban bisphenol A in children's products. With the United Steelworkers, he founded Blue Green Canada, the first permanent partnership between trade unions and environmental organizations in the country. He was instrumental in the establishment of the Socially and Environmentally Responsible Aggregate (SERA) initiative, the world’s first independently-certified sustainability standard for the global aggregate and concrete industry. Smith was one of the founders of the Strathmere Group.

From 2012 to 2021, Smith was Executive Director of the Broadbent Institute. During that time, the Institute became Canada’s pre-eminent progressive policy and training organization with offices in Montreal, Toronto, Ottawa and Vancouver. The Institute’s media project, PressProgress, became Canada’s most-shared source of progressive news and analysis. Smith is also an advisor to Progress Toronto.

In 2021, Smith was announced as the new President of the Canadian Climate Institute. Under his leadership, the Climate Institute solidified its reputation as Canada’s leading climate change policy research organization, publishing independent research and analysis on Canada's climate policy progress, and establishing an annual conference.

== Books ==
Smith co-authored “Slow Death by Rubber Duck: How the Toxicity of Everyday Life Affects Our Health” (2009, Knopf Canada, re-issued 2019, Knopf Canada) and “Toxin Toxout: Getting Harmful Chemicals Out of Our Bodies and Our World” (2013, Knopf Canada in Canada; St. Martin's Press in the U.S.) A Quill & Quire “Book of the Year” for 2009, “Slow Death by Rubber Duck” has been translated into seven languages, featured at the Sydney Writers’ Festival, and by the Washington Post ( “hard-hitting in a way that turns your stomach and yet also instills hope”), Dr. Oz, Fox News, and Oprah Magazine. In their two books, Smith and his co-author, prominent Canadian environmental expert Bruce Lourie, experiment on their own bodies, raising and lowering levels of toxic chemicals in their blood and urine through the performance of common activities. Their new experimentation in the 2019 re-issue of “Slow Death by Rubber Duck” has sparked a renewed debate on the presence of bisphenol A in consumer items. Smith’s research is featured in the award-winning documentary “Toxic Beauty” and his self-experimentation for a feature on plastic pollution in The Globe and Mail resulted in his being one of the first people in the world, and the first in North America, to find microplastic particles in his body.

== Personal ==
Smith currently lives in the east end of Toronto.
