= Cuius est solum, eius est usque ad coelum et ad inferos =

Principle of property law concerning air and subsurface rights

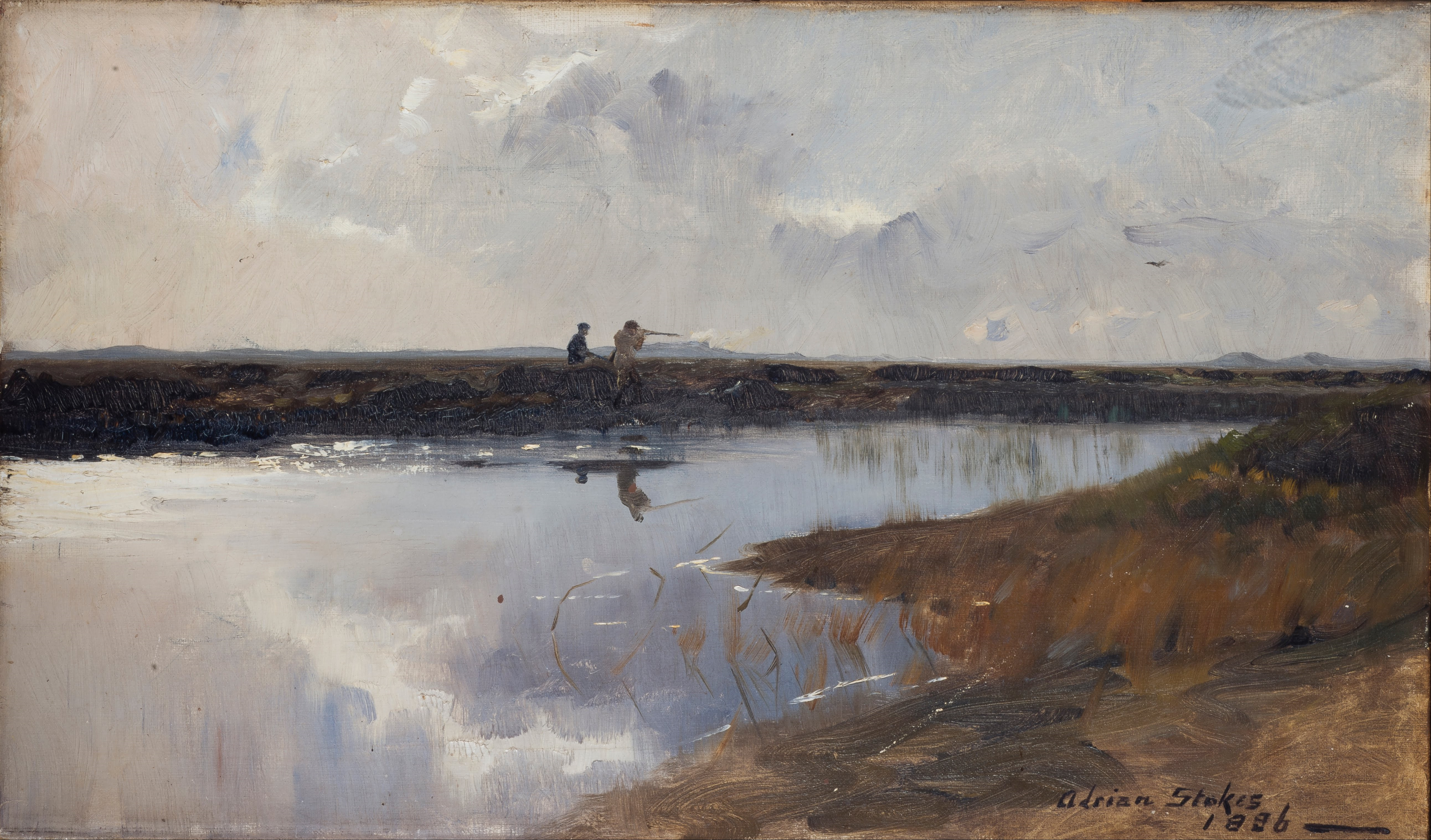
At common law, property owners held title to all resources located above, below, or upon their land

Cuius est solum, eius est usque ad coelum et ad inferos (Latin for "whoever's is the soil, it is theirs all the way to the sky and to the depths") is a principle of property law, stating that property holders have rights not only to the plot of land itself, but also the air above and (in the broader formulation) the ground below. The principle is often referred to in its abbreviated form as the ad coelum doctrine.

In modern law, this principle is still accepted in limited form; the rights are divided into air rights above and subsurface rights below. Property title includes to the space immediately above and below the ground – preventing overhanging parts of neighboring buildings – but do not have rights to control flights far above the ground or in space. In dense urban areas, air rights may be transferable (see transferable development rights) to allow construction of new buildings over existing buildings.

In some jurisdictions, the ability to exploit mineral rights – as a subset of subsurface rights, beyond a specified depth – is completely separate to property title. In such jurisdictions, these rights are often owned permanently by the state and are leased from it for a fixed time period.

Early versions of the maxim have been traced to the 13th-century Italian jurist Accursius, and is said to date in common law to the time of Edward I. It was more recently promulgated, in broad form (air above and ground below), by William Blackstone in his influential treatise Commentaries on the Laws of England (1766).

== Applications ==
As the name describes, the principle is that a person who owns a particular piece of land owns everything above and below it as well. Consequently, the owner could prosecute trespass against people who violated the border but never actually touched the soil. As with any other property rights, the owner can sell or lease it to others, or it may be taken or regulated by the state.

For example, suppose three people owned neighboring plots of land. The owners of the plots on the ends want to build a bridge over the center plot connecting their two properties. Even though the bridge would never touch the soil of the owner in the middle, the principle of cuius est solum would allow the middle owner to stop its construction or demand payment for the right to do so. By the same principle, a person who wants to mine under somebody's land would have to get permission from the owner to do so, even if the mine entrance was on neighboring land.

== Origins ==
The phrase is credited to the Glossa ordinaria of Accursius in the 13th century, who commented "Nota. Cujus est solum, ejus debet esse usque ad coelum, ut hic, & infra 'quod vi aut clam' i f. § pen." to Dig. 8.2.1. It has been suggested that the principle was brought to England by Accursius's son, Franciscus Accursius, who came to England with Edward I on the latter's return from the crusades. The principle was firmly established in common law by Edward Coke in Bury v. Pope (1587), which gives the first statement in English law of the principle, writing (Liber 1, section 1, page 4, section "Terra" (earth)):

And lastly, the earth hath in law a great extent upwards, not only of water as hath been said, but of aire, and all other things even up to heaven, for cujus est solum ejus est usque ad coelum, as it is holden.

The reporter's note to this case ascribes the maxim to the time of Edward I, which accords with the attribution to Accursius (father and son). Two other cases around 1600 also use the principle, and a number of 19th century cases also apply it.

The phrase appears in Blackstone's Commentaries, Book 2, Chapter 2, p. *18:

Land hath also, in its legal signification, an indefinite extent, upwards as well as downwards. Cujus est solum, ejus est usque ad coelum, is the maxim of the law, upwards; therefore no man may erect any building, or the like, to overhang another's land: and, downwards, whatever is in a direct line between the surface of any land, and the center of the earth, belongs to the owner of the surface; as is every day's experience in the mining countries. So that the word "land" includes not only the face of the earth, but every thing under it, or over it. And therefore if a man grants all his lands, he grants thereby all his mines of metal and other fossils, his woods, his waters, and his houses, as well as his fields and meadows.

This formulation, though it omits the et ad inferos "and to hell" wording, includes that interpretation ("and the center of the earth"). Largely through the influence of Blackstone, this broader formulation became influential in American law. See Sweeney reference for various formulations of the principle in Anglo-American law.

The principle does not occur in classical Roman law. The phrase was used by Accursius in discussion of rights to have burial plots or tombs free from the interference of an overhanging building. In Coke's formulation, he cites three cases involving birds; the circa 1600 cases involve overhanging roofs, while the 19th century cases address diverse topics. The principle attracted increased interest with the development of air and space travel occasioning much discussion, particularly in the 1930s, and the development of space travel yielding further review of the ad coelum doctrine in the 1960s.

In American law, the formulation Ab orco usque ad coelum "from Hades all the way to Heaven" by Louis Brandeis is also found.

== Modern history ==
The steadfast ad coelum doctrine of property began to fall into disfavor with the advent of air and space travel:

After the first hot-air balloon flight in 1783, people began to realize that ad coelum could lead to absurd results. Jurists occasionally invoked aerial-balloon trespass as an example of a trivial injury for which the law wouldn't provide redress, and it appears that no one ever sued a balloonist just for flying over. ...even if the balloonists' flights were technically illegal, "the law was out of step with the expectations of the parties, in that neither landowners nor balloonists thought there was anything wrong with overflights".

Although everyone tolerated balloons, the invention of the airplane forced the legal world to seriously rethink the aerial-trespass problem. Most everyone found the old rule undesirable, but people disagreed on how it could be discarded. Adherents of the common-law view that judges "found" the law (in the people's customs or through reason) had to argue either that earlier courts erred in adopting the principle from Roman law (i.e., they argued that this wasn't actually the Romans' rule), or that the earlier rule was narrower in scope than its wording suggested. Legal positivists had an easier argument: if judges just "make" law, then they could now make it one way instead of another. And legal realists could simply predict that judges would modify the law because the facts of cases would persuade them to do so.

=== English law ===
The rights of landowners to the airspace immediately over their land were affirmed in England and Wales in Kelsen v. Imperial Tobacco Co. where a sign erected on a building that overhung the plaintiff's property committed the tort of trespass, even though no harm or nuisance was caused by it. An injunction was granted to the landowner requiring the sign to be removed. The right of landowners to prevent the 'overflying' without their permission of the large crane jibs used in construction has also been affirmed. In Lord Bernstein of Leigh v Skyviews & General Ltd, the Court noted that the ad coelum phrase was 'colourful', but said that it was well settled in the common law that a land owner had rights in the air immediately above the land, extending in particular to signs overhanging from adjacent properties. The right did not extend though to more than was 'necessary for the ordinary use and enjoyment of the land and structures upon it'.

In Star Energy Weald Basin Limited and another v Bocardo SA, the UK Supreme Court (having heard argument that the principle was no longer relevant to land ownership) held that the principle "still has value in English law as encapsulating, in simple language, a proposition of law which has commanded general acceptance. It is an imperfect guide, as it has ceased to apply to the use of airspace above a height which may interfere with the ordinary user of land [cf Bernstein, above]". The Supreme Court nevertheless upheld the claimant's right to claim for trespass at depths of 250 to 400 metres below the surface, whilst acknowledging that subterranean ownership could not extend indefinitely; albeit compensation for such a trespass would be very small as there was no interference in any practical sense with the land through which the pipe was passed. The decision has subsequently been restricted by section 43 of the Infrastructure Act 2015, which permits the exploitation of 'deep level land' (defined as land more than 300 metres below the surface) for certain purposes without liability for trespass. This was passed as a statutory alienation of rights over freehold registered land that proprietors have to facilitate 'fracking', and would have permitted some (though not all) of the intrusions in the Bocardo case.

=== United States ===
In the United States, the end of the indefinitely upward interpretation of the ad coelum doctrine came from a well-reasoned United States Supreme Court case United States v. Causby in 1946. In the Causby case:

low-flying military planes caused the plaintiffs' chickens to "jump up against the side of the chicken house and the walls and burst themselves open and die". The plaintiffs sued the government, arguing that they were entitled to compensation under the takings clause of the Fifth Amendment.

The court's decision, authored by Justice William O. Douglas, could have resolved the case on a narrow ground by simply holding that there was a taking of land because the government's flights affected the land. Justice Douglas did reach that conclusion, but then he went much further and opined on what airspace landowners do and do not own. He wrote that "if the landowner is to have full enjoyment of the land, he must have exclusive control of the immediate reaches of the enveloping atmosphere. Otherwise buildings could not be erected, trees could not be planted, and even fences could not be run". Thus, a landowner "owns at least as much of the space above the ground as he can occupy or use in connection with the land", and invasions of that airspace "are in the same category as invasions of the surface".

The Causby case rejected the notion that property ownership extended upward 'indefinitely', while still recognizing a landowner retains complete domain over the lower altitudes above their property. The court noted that ad coelum "had no meaning in the modern world", while also holding that "if the landowner is to have full enjoyment of the land, he must have exclusive control of the immediate reaches of the enveloping atmosphere. Otherwise buildings could not be erected, trees could not be planted, and even fences could not be run" and "The fact that he does not occupy [the space] in a physical sense -- by the erection of buildings and the like -- is not material. As we have said, the flight of airplanes, which skim the surface but do not touch it, is as much an appropriation of the use of the land as a more conventional entry upon it." id 264 . On remand, the Court of Claims established the landowner's property extends upward to only 365 feet, but not above: see Causby v U.S. court of claims (1948).

The "ad infernum" theory positing property ownership "to the center of the Earth" has also been eroded. A review of modern American jurisprudence demonstrates that the theory is more poetic hyperbole than binding law, and that broadly speaking, the deeper the disputed region, the less likely courts are to recognize that the surface owner holds subsurface title. Appraisal studies of subsurface projects such as subways, deep storm drainage tunnels, and particle colliders consistently conclude that such projects, built well below the area that the vast majority of surface property owners ever put to use, do not deprive the surface owners of any value.

=== International law ===
With the advent of space exploration, the upper limits to the "ad coelum" doctrine now include issues of national sovereignty. Strong arguments can be made for and against the altitude at which national sovereignty ceases and the rights of orbit or travel start. In particular, the making of national territorial claims in outer space and on celestial bodies has been specifically proscribed by the 1967 Outer Space Treaty, which was, as of 2012, ultimately ratified by all space-faring nations. Article II of the treaty notes that "Outer space, including the moon and other celestial bodies, is not subject to national appropriation by claim of sovereignty, by means of use or occupation." The "ad coelum" doctrine - that property or sovereignty extends indefinable upward - is no longer accepted without limitations. This is not surprising insofar as any claim to space based on national boundaries is necessarily defined in a frame of reference based on a rotating planet; any attempt to extend such a framework into space would produce absurd results.

== See also ==
- Air rights
- Airspace, an analogous concept in international law
- Australian mining law
- Chicago Convention on International Civil Aviation
- Energy law
- Kármán line
- Mineral rights
- Ratione soli
- Riparian rights
- Right to light – right to light passing through adjacent air space
- Property law
- United States v. Causby
