= Väätsa Parish =

Former municipality of Estonia

Coordinates: 58°53′N 25°27′E

Väätsa Parish Väätsa vald
- Former municipality of Estonia
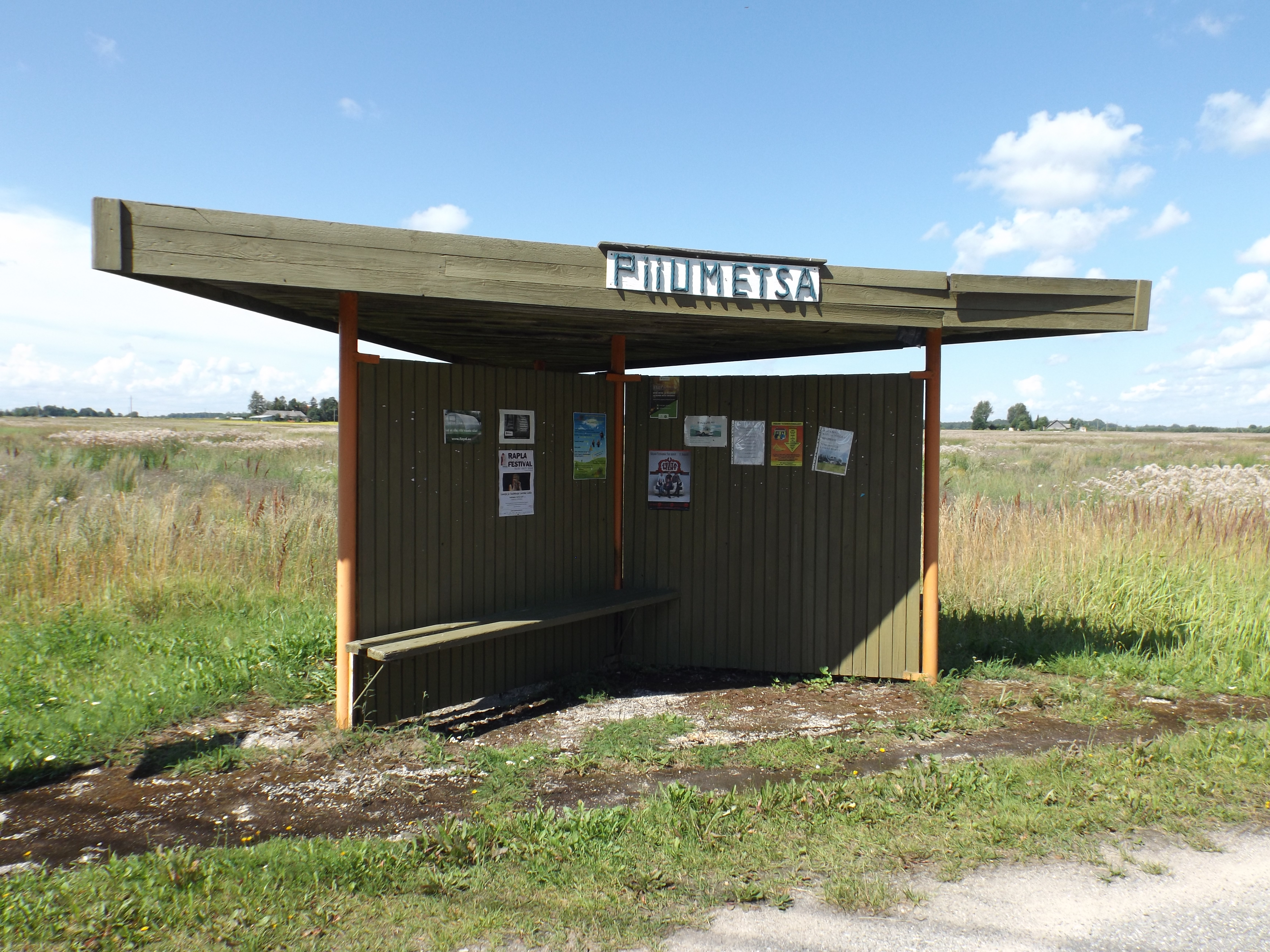
- Bus stop in Piiumetsa village

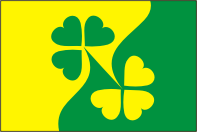
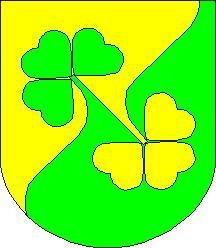
- Flag Coat of arms

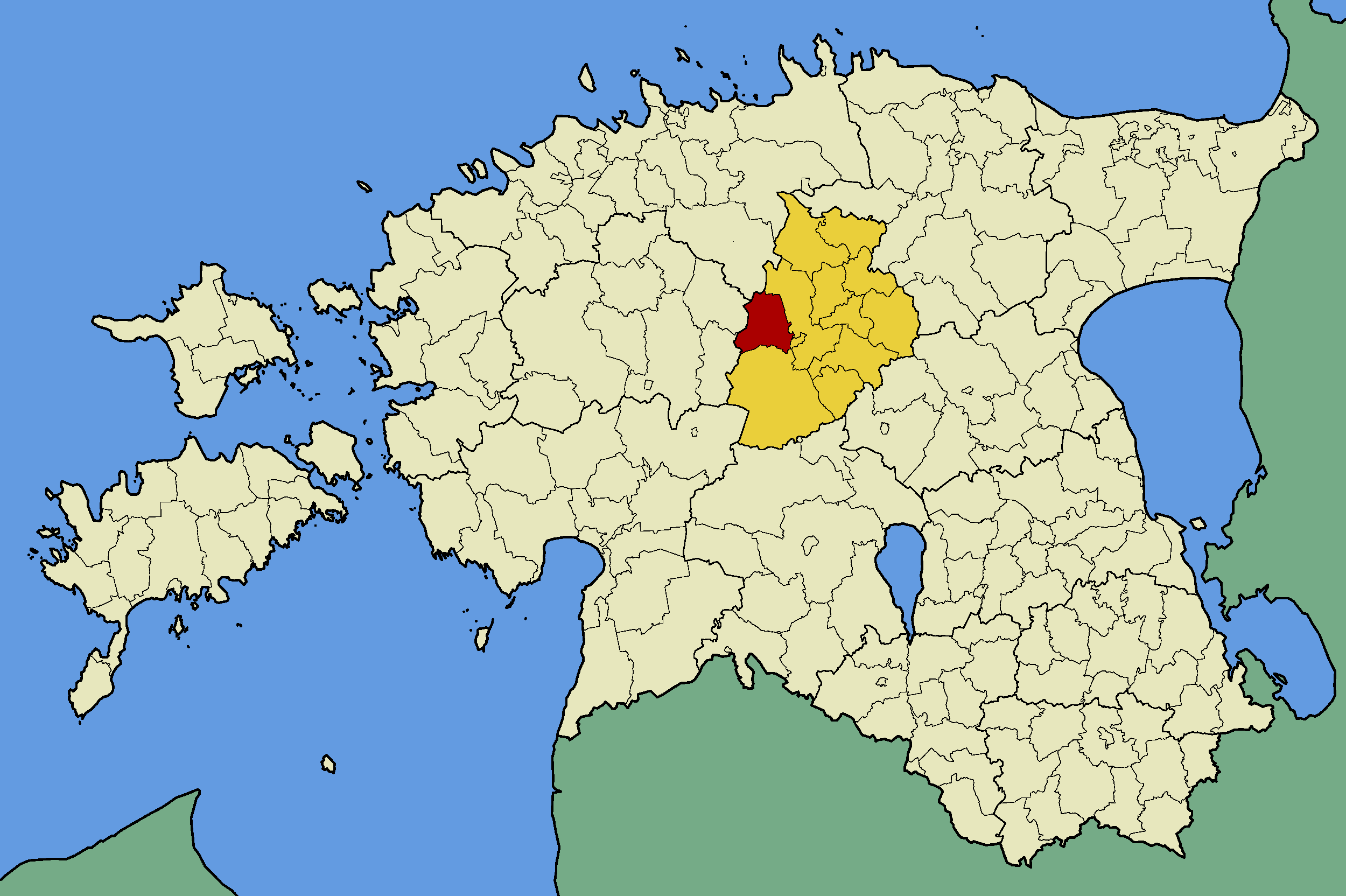
- Väätsa Parish within Järva County.
- Country: Estonia
- County: Järva County
- Administrative centre: Väätsa

Area
  - Total: 195.33 km^{2} (75.42 sq mi)

Population (01.01.2004)
  - Total: 1,479
  - Density: 7.572/km^{2} (19.61/sq mi)
- Website: www.vaatsa.ee

Väätsa Parish (Estonian: Väätsa vald) was a rural municipality in central Estonia. It was a part of Järva County. The municipality had a population of 1,479 (as of 1 January 2004) and covered an area of 195.33 km^{2}. The population density was 7.6 inhabitants per km^{2}.

Administrative centre of the municipality was Väätsa small borough (alevik). There were also 10 villages in Väätsa Parish: Aasuvälja, Lõõla, Piiumetsa, Reopalu, Röa, Roovere, Saueaugu, Ülejõe, Väljataguse, Vissuvere.

== Geography ==
Väätsa is in an area with large cultivated fields and neat woodlands in the northern part of the Türi drumlins and in the upper courses of the Lokuta and Reopalu rivers. In the borough of Väätsa are the manor complex and park dating from the early 19th century, the historic commune house from the late 19th century and the buildings from the collective farm period. In 1970, an extension was attached to the single-storey classicist main building of the Väätsa manor. The manor's stable has been reconstructed as a guesthouse. The irregularly shaped manor complex is integrated with a park with a range of species, a pond in the southern part, and a boundary wall around it. Immediately to the south, west, and north of the manor are modern buildings. A lake created on the Lokuta River has a varied shoreline, with detached houses on the western and eastern shores.
