= Iidva Nature Reserve =

Protected area in Estonia

- Location within Estonia
- Location: Estonia
- Coordinates: 58°51′N 25°18′E
- Area: 810 hectares (2,000 acres)
- Established: 2006

Iidva Nature Reserve is a nature reserve which is located in Järva County, Estonia.

The area of the nature reserve is 810 hectares (2,000 acres).

The protected area was founded in 2006 to protect valuable habitat types and threatened species in Änari village (Türi Parish) and Piiumetsa and Roovere village (both in former Väätsa Parish).
