= Väätsa Nature Reserve =

Protected area in Estonia

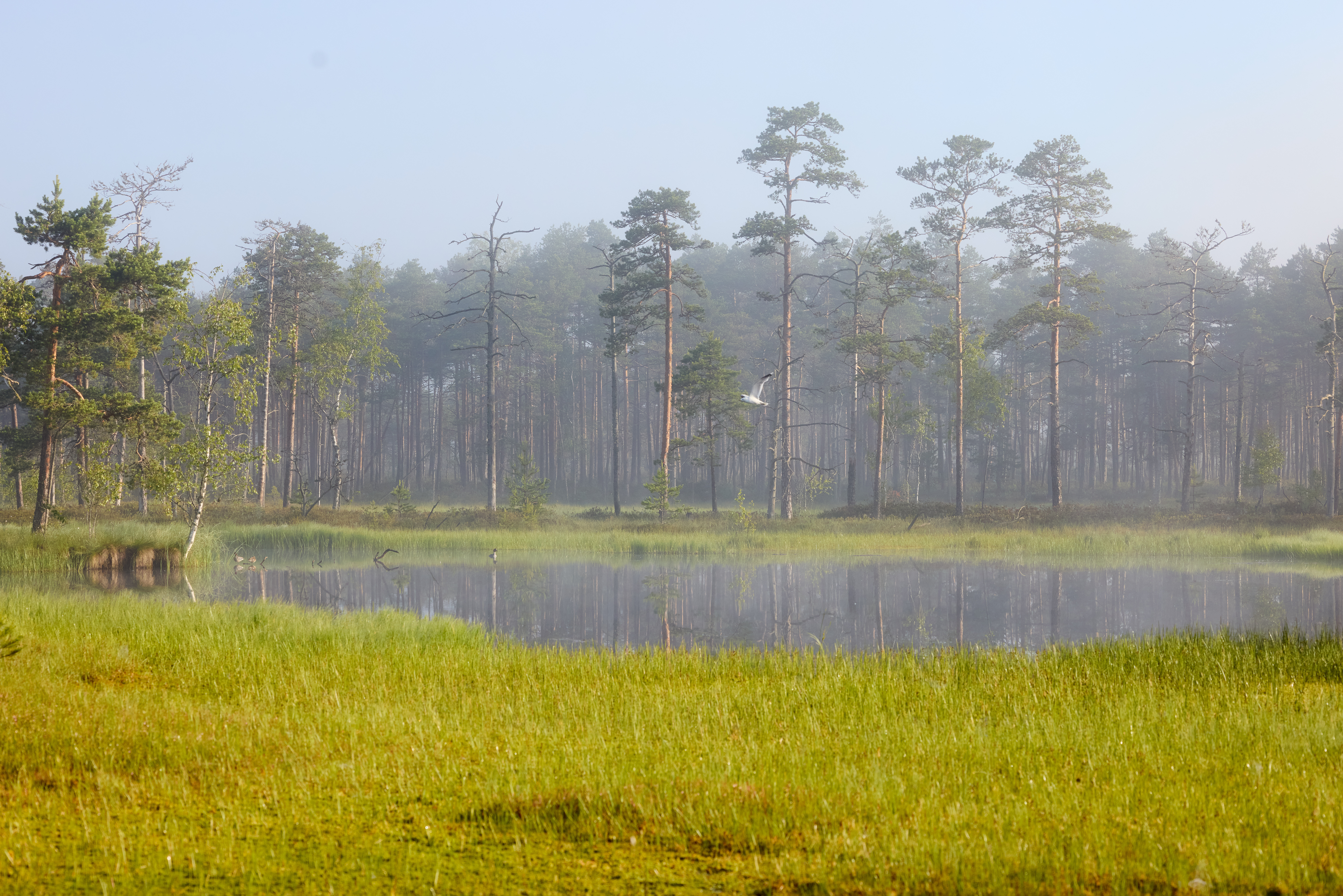

- Location within Estonia
- Location: Estonia
- Coordinates: 58°56′N 25°28′E
- Area: 418 ha (1,030 acres)
- Established: 2005

Väätsa Nature Reserve is a nature reserve which is located in Järva County, Estonia.

The area of the nature reserve is 418 ha.

The protected area was founded in 2005 to protect valuable habitat types and threatened species in Saueaugu, Röa and Vissuvere village (all in Türi Parish).
