= Nõmme Mire Nature Reserve =

Protected area in Estonia

- Location within Estonia
- Location: Estonia
- Coordinates: 58°42′N 25°27′E
- Area: 437 ha (1,080 acres)
- Established: 2006

Nõmme Mire Nature Reserve is a nature reserve which is located in Järva County, Estonia.

The area of the nature reserve is 437 ha.

The protected area was founded in 2006 to protect valuable habitat types and threatened species in Kärevere, Pibari, Tännassilma, and Villevere villages (all in Türi Parish).
