= Väljaotsa =

Väljaotsa may refer to several places in Estonia:

- Väljaotsa, Järva County, village in Türi Parish, Järva County
- Väljaotsa, Jõgeva County, village in Jõgeva Parish, Jõgeva County
