= Anari =

Anari may refer to:

== Films ==
- Anari (1959 film), a Bollywood film directed by Hrishikesh Mukherjee
- Anari (1975 film), a Bollywood film directed by Asit Sen, starring Shashi Kapoor, Sharmila Tagore and Moushumi Chatterjee
- Anari (1993 film), a Hindi film directed by K. Muralimohana Rao and starring Karishma Kapoor and Venkatesh

== Places ==
- Anari, Iranshahr, Sistan and Baluchestan Province, Iran
- Anari River, a river of Rondônia state in western Brazil
- Änari, village in Türi Parish, Järva County, Estonia

== Other uses ==
- Anari cheese, a Cypriot cheese
- Anari (musician) (born 1970), Basque musician
