= Raukla =

Village in Estonia

Coordinates: 58°47′N 25°31′E

- Village
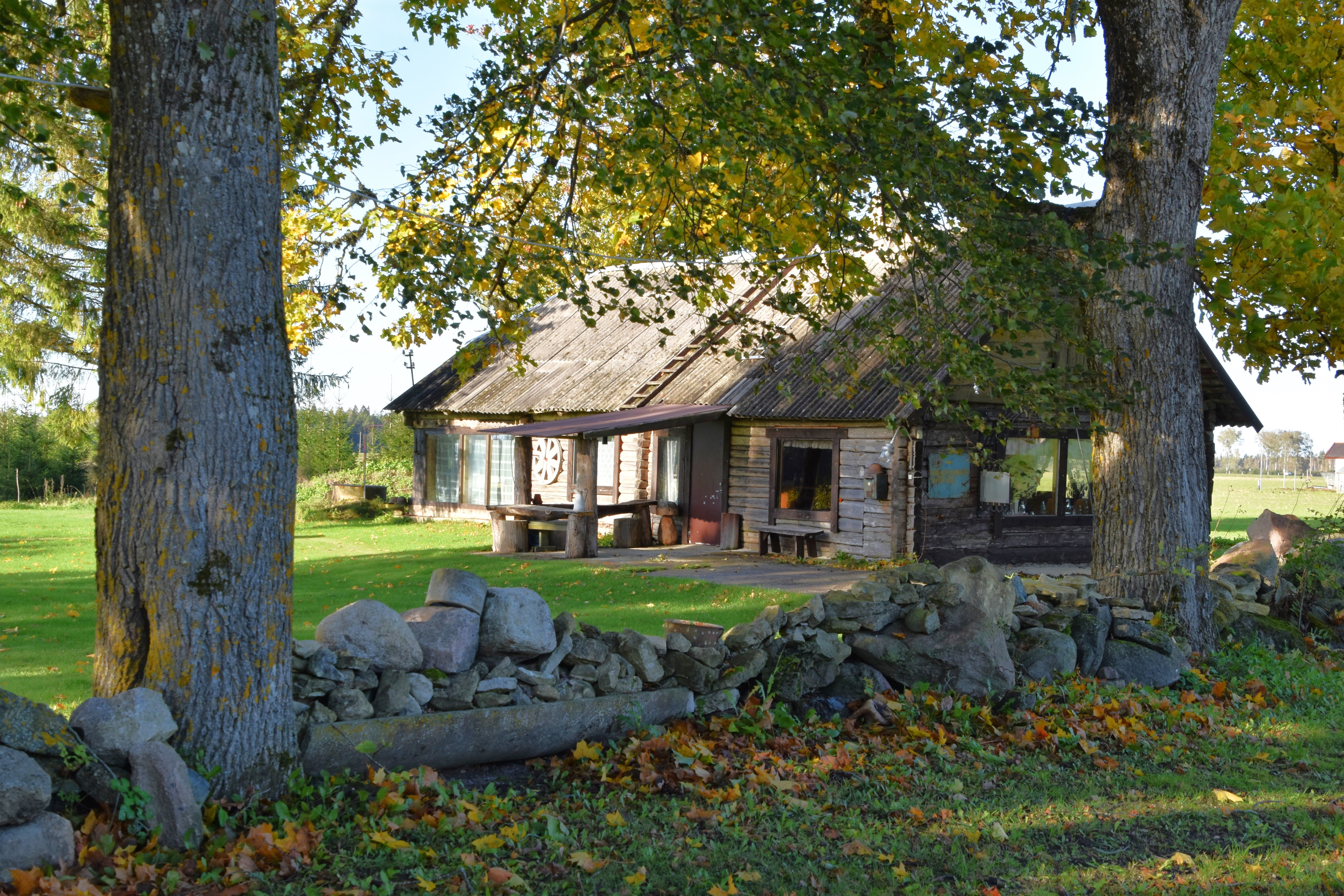
- House in Raukla
- Interactive map of Raukla
- Country: Estonia
- County: Järva County
- Parish: Türi Parish
- Time zone: UTC+2 (EET)
  - Summer (DST): UTC+3 (EEST)

Raukla is a village in Türi Parish, Järva County in central Estonia.
