= Jändja =

Village in Estonia

Coordinates: 58°45′N 25°20′E

- Village
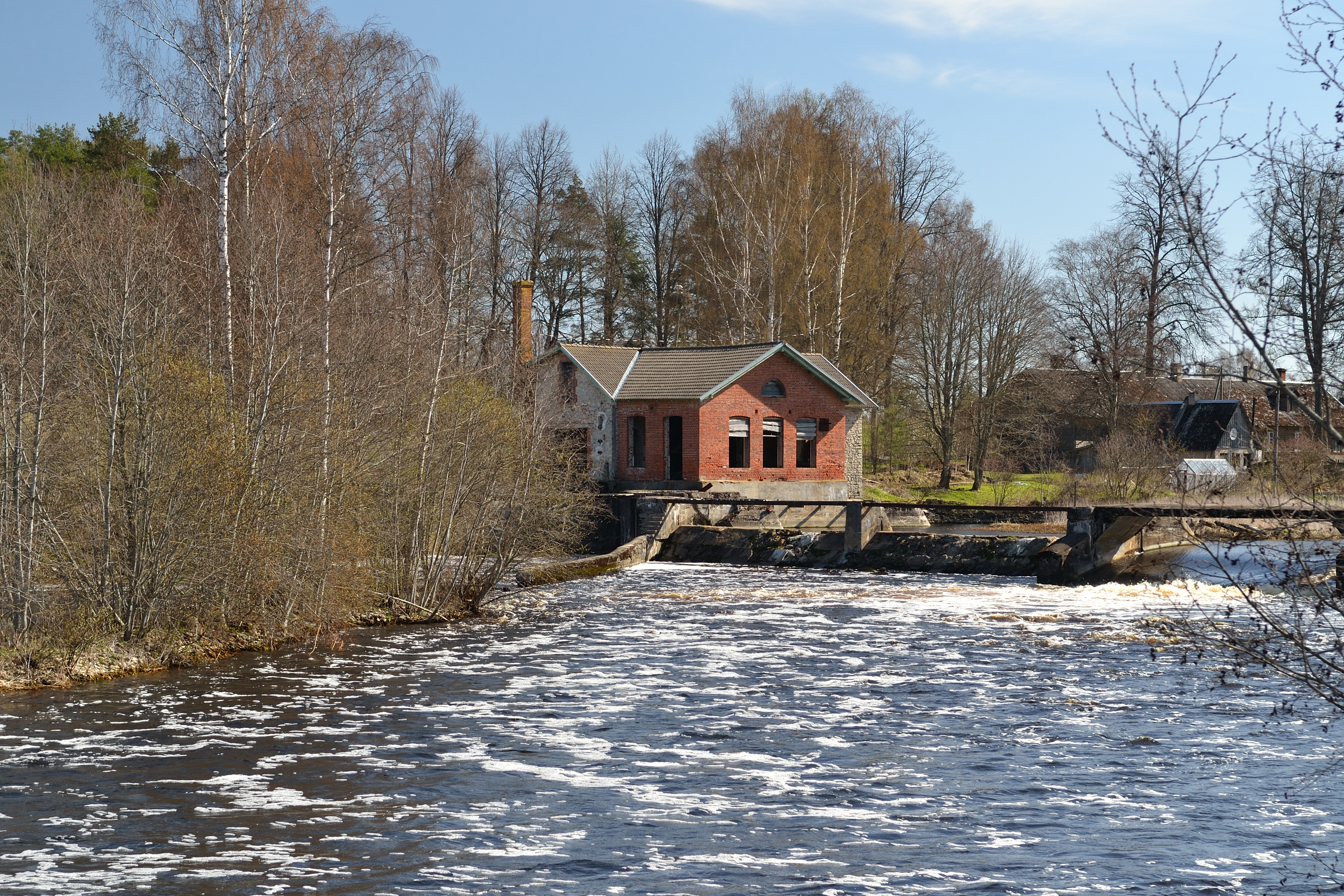
- Jändja watermill
- Interactive map of Jändja
- Country: Estonia
- County: Järva County
- Parish: Türi Parish
- Time zone: UTC+2 (EET)
  - Summer (DST): UTC+3 (EEST)

Jändja is a village in Türi Parish, Järva County in central Estonia.
