= Kirna, Järva County =

Village in Estonia

Kirna
- Village
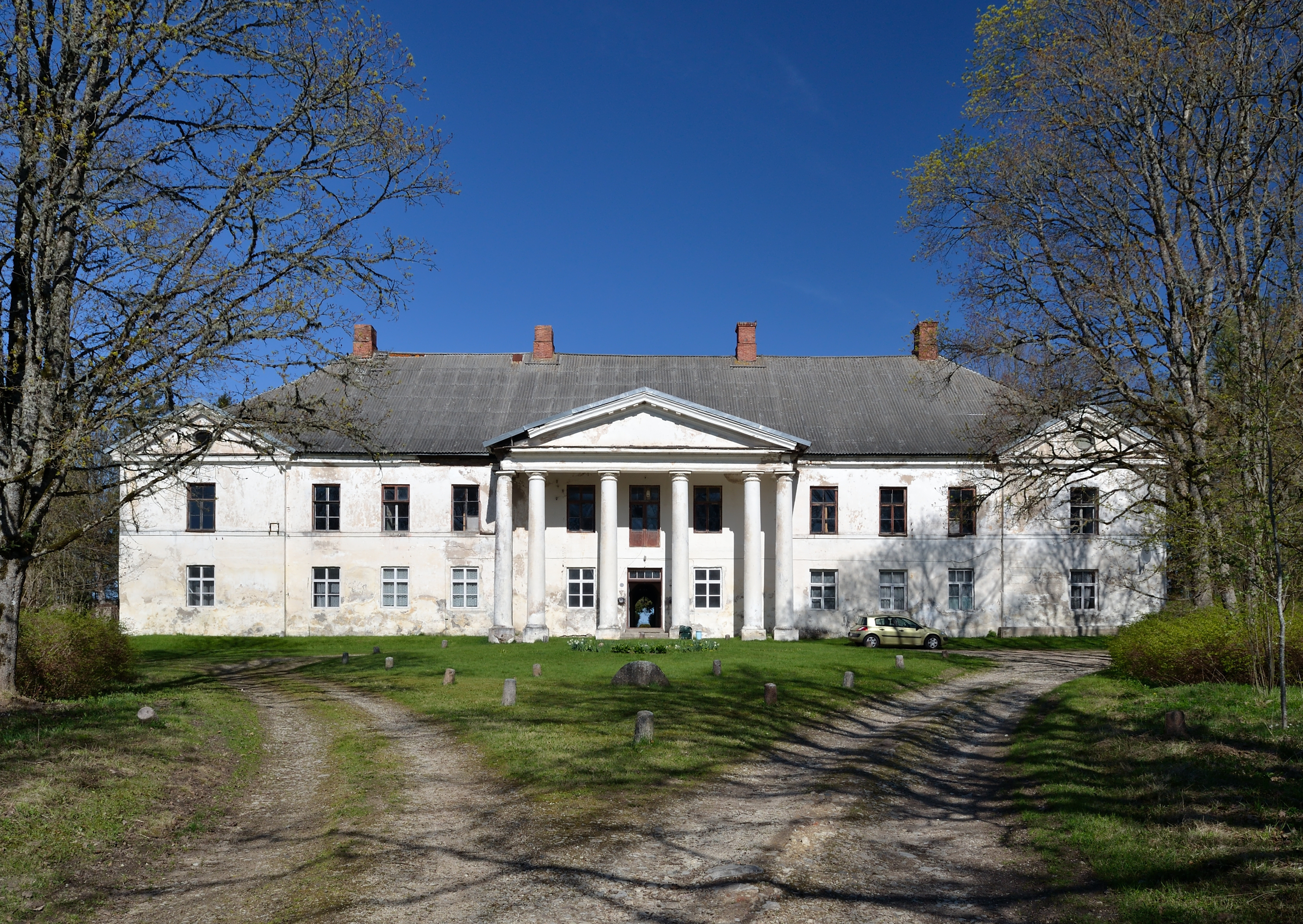
- Kirna Manor

- Location in Estonia
- Coordinates: 58°50′52″N 25°28′27″E
- Country: Estonia
- County: Järva County
- Parish: Türi Parish
- Time zone: UTC+2 (EET)
  - Summer (DST): UTC+3 (EEST)

Kirna is a village in Türi Parish, Järva County in central Estonia.

== Kirna Manor ==
The whole estate was given as a gift to the von Fersen family in 1614 and remained in the ownership for over a hundred years. After 1787, it belonged to various Baltic German and Russian families from the nobility. After 1919 it was used as a school up until World War II. During the Soviet occupation of Estonia, the manor housed the offices of a collective farm.

The building received its present appearance during a neoclassical reconstruction of an earlier building around 1820. The hall and other ceremonial rooms on the main floor was at that time also decorated with typical stucco ornaments. Some later additions were in a neo-Gothic style.

== See also ==
- List of palaces and manor houses in Estonia
