= Kurla, Estonia =

Village in Estonia

Coordinates: 58°41′N 25°41′E

Kurla
- Village
- Interactive map of Kurla
- Country: Estonia
- County: Järva County
- Parish: Türi Parish
- Time zone: UTC+2 (EET)
  - Summer (DST): UTC+3 (EEST)

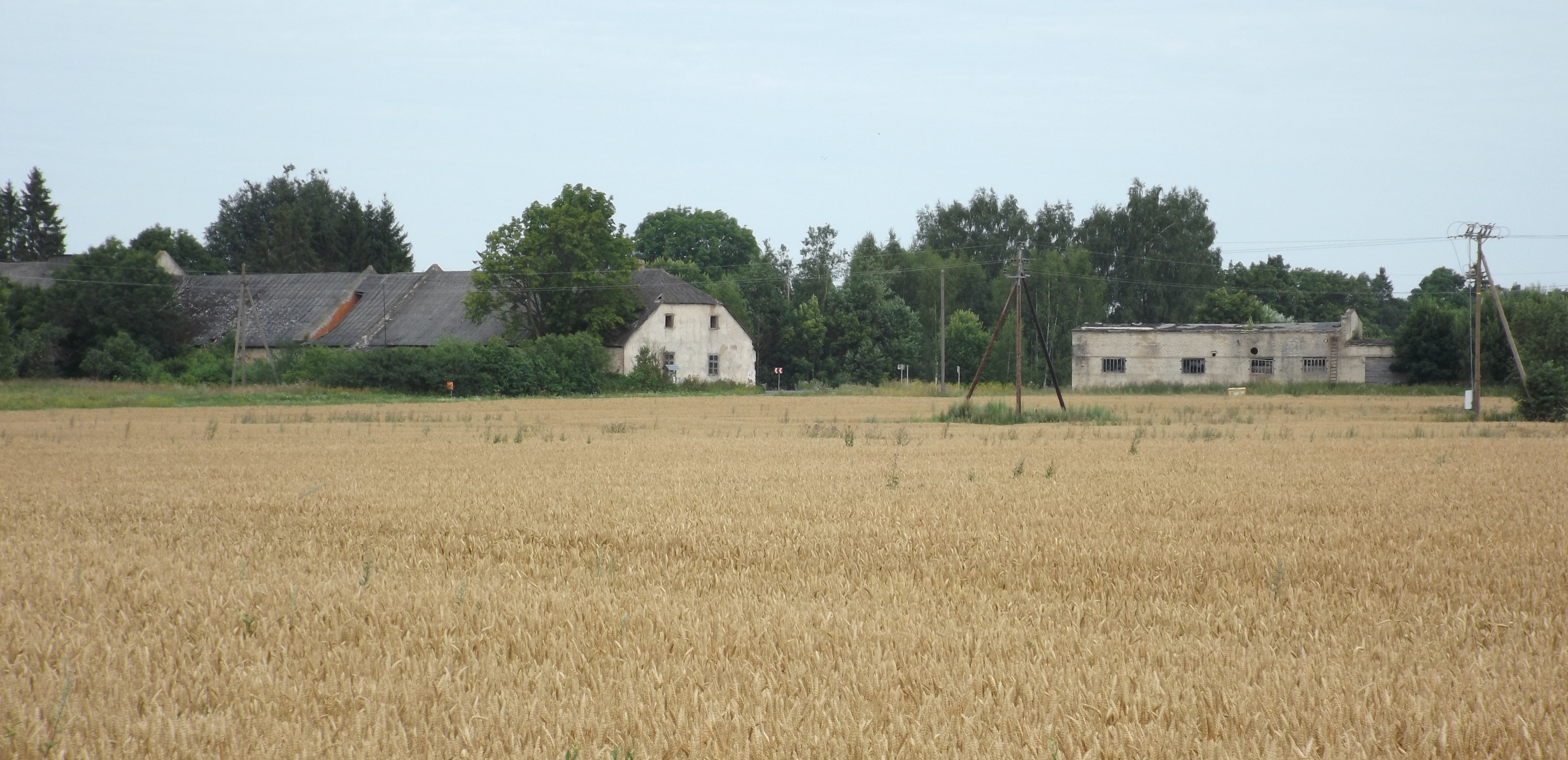
The village

Kurla is a village in Türi Parish, Järva County in central Estonia.

Politician August Rei (1886–1963) was born in Kurla.
