= Äiamaa =

Village in Estonia

- Village
- Location in Estonia
- Coordinates: 58°47′N 25°33′E
- Country: Estonia
- County: Järva County
- Parish: Türi Parish
- Time zone: UTC+2 (EET)
  - Summer (DST): UTC+3 (EEST)

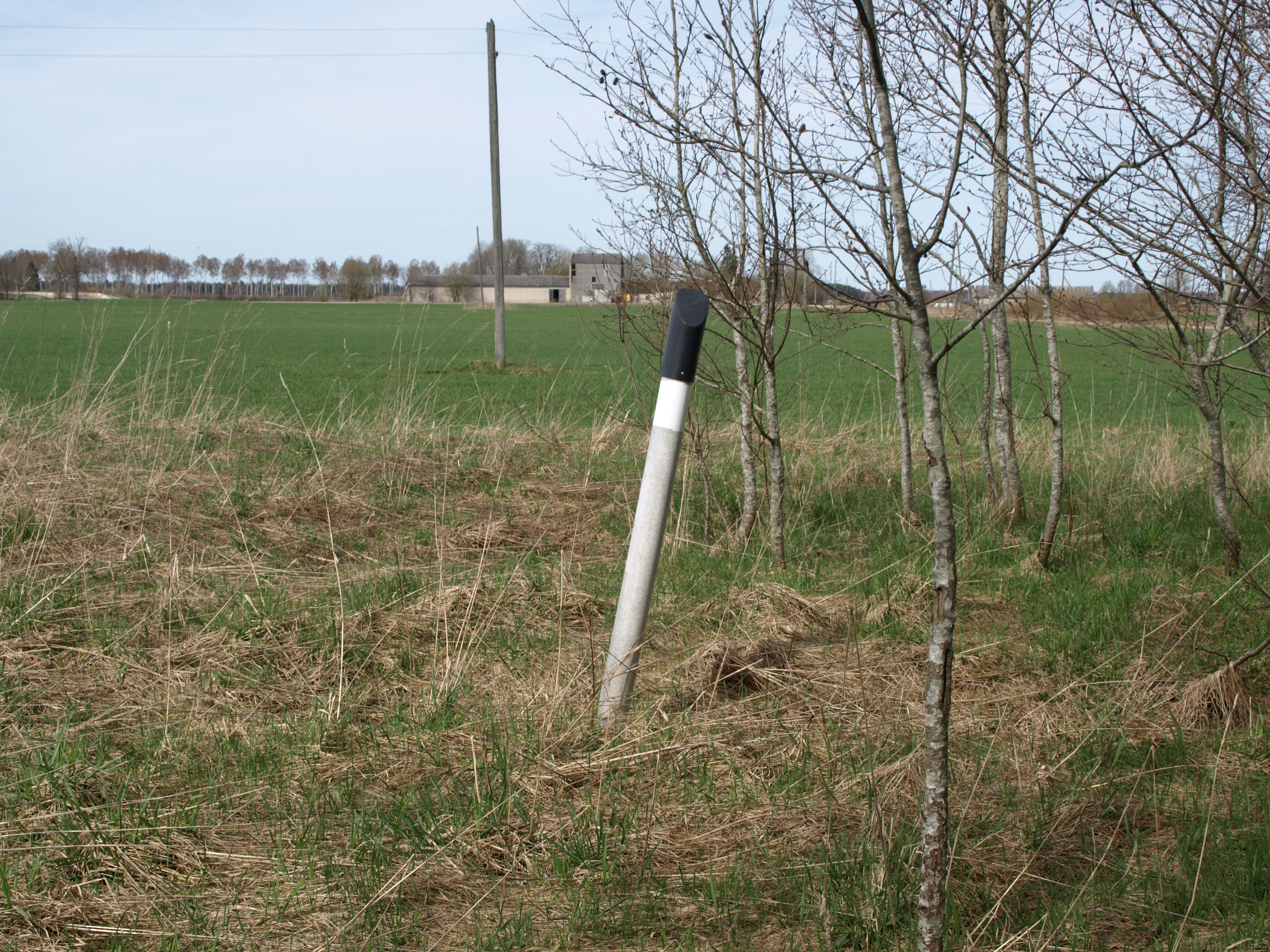

Äiamaa is a village in Türi Parish, Järva County in central Estonia.
