= Väätsa =

Village in Estonia

- Small borough
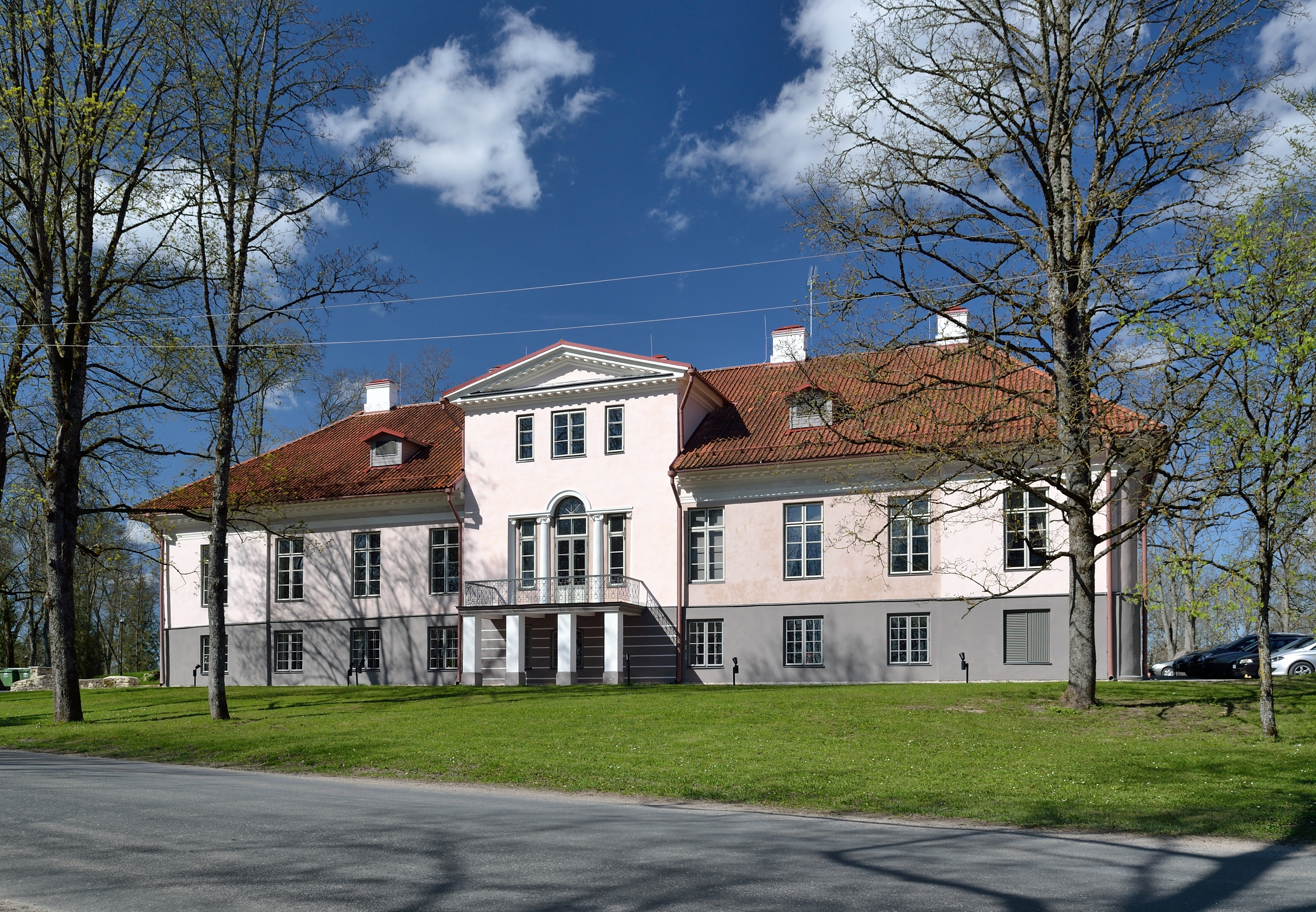
- Väätsa Manor

- Location in Estonia
- Coordinates: 58°53′19″N 25°27′12″E
- Country: Estonia
- County: Järva County
- Municipality: Türi Parish
- First mentioned: 1564

Population (01.01.2006)
  - Total: 704

Väätsa is a small borough (Estonian: alevik) in Järva County, in central Estonia. It's located about 6 km (4 mi) west of the town of Paide, and about 9 km (6 mi) north of Türi. Väätsa was the administrative centre of Väätsa Parish, and is now part of Türi Parish. Väätsa has a population of 704 (as of 1 January 2006).

Väätsa was first mentioned in 1564 as a village. Väätsa Manor (Waetz) was established under the Swedish rule in the 1620s and 1630s by Magnus von Nieroth. After 1686 the manor was owned by the Baranoffs for about two centuries. The Neo-Classicist main building was built from 1796 to 1800. Also the manor centre and Baroque style park were developed that time. After the Estonian independence the manor was dispossessed from Johann Anton von Seydlitz in 1919. From 1925 a local school operated in the main building. In the 1970s an annexe was built for the needs of school. In 2010–2011 the manor and the park were fully restored. The stables are reconstructed into a guesthouse "Vana Tall".
