= Lokuta, Järva County =

Village in Estonia

Coordinates: 58°49′N 25°23′E

Lokuta
- Village
- Interactive map of Lokuta
- Country: Estonia
- County: Järva County
- Parish: Türi Parish
- Time zone: UTC+2 (EET)
  - Summer (DST): UTC+3 (EEST)

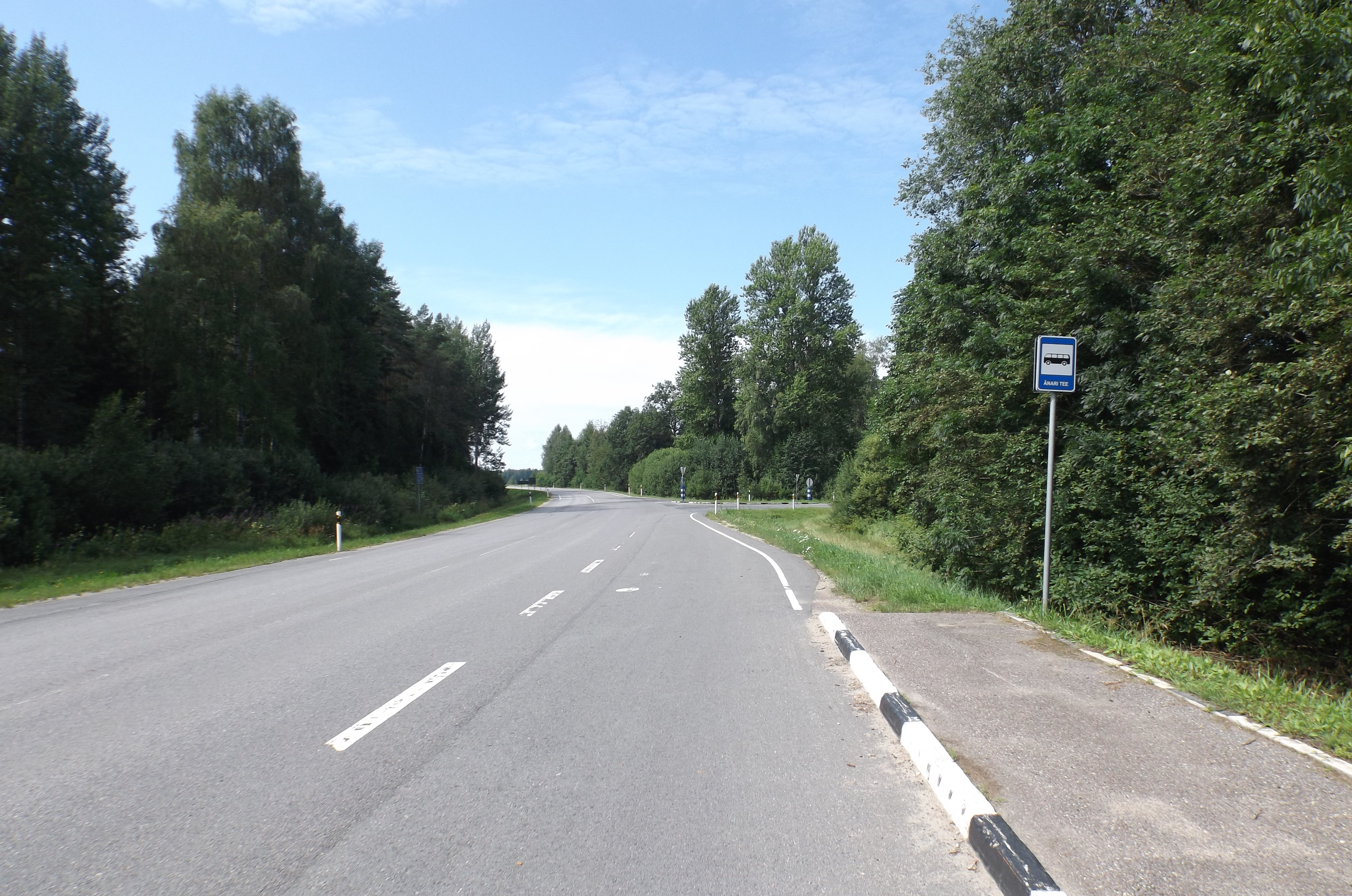
Änari road bus stop in Lokuta village on the Tallinn-Rapla-Türi road (15)

Lokuta is a village in Türi Parish, Järva County in central Estonia.
