= Saarjõgi Landscape Conservation Area =

Protected area in Estonia

- Location within Estonia
- Location: Estonia
- Coordinates: 58°36′N 25°14′E
- Area: 1,759 ha (4,350 acres)
- Established: 2006

Saarjõgi Landscape Conservation Area (Estonian: Saarjõe maastikukaitseala) is a nature park in Viljandi County, Estonia.

The area of the nature park is 1759 ha.

The protected area was founded in 2006 to protect landscapes and biodiversity in Rassi (Türi Parish), Kaansoo (Vändra Parish) and Kootsi village (Suure-Jaani Parish).
