= Tori, Järva County =

Village in Estonia

Coordinates: 58°48′15″N 25°28′45″E

Tori küla
- Village
- Interactive map of Tori küla
- Country: Estonia
- County: Järva County
- Parish: Türi Parish
- Time zone: UTC+2 (EET)
  - Summer (DST): UTC+3 (EEST)

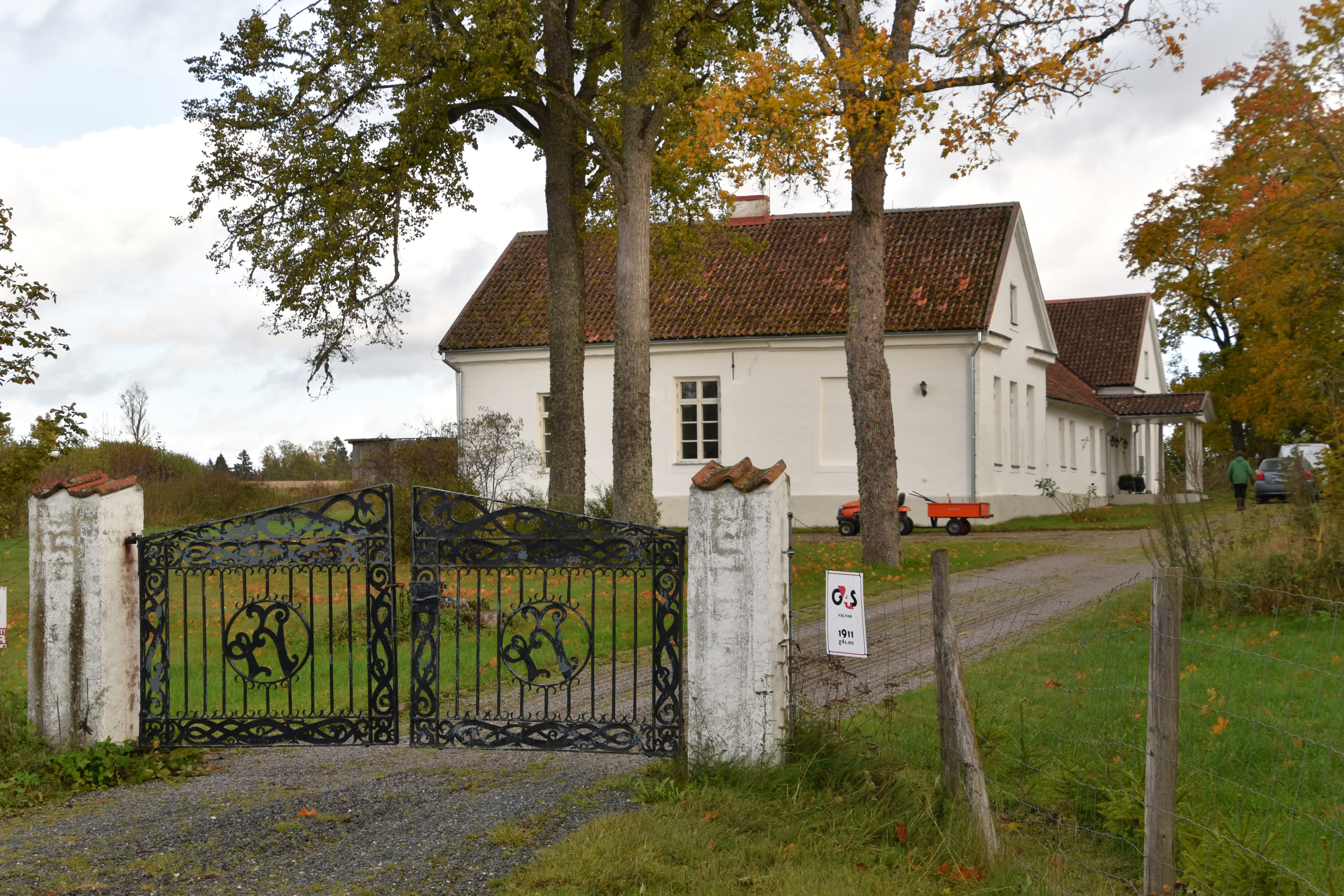
Tori Manor, Türi municipality, Järva County.

Tori küla (German: Torgel) is a village in Türi Parish, Järva County in central Estonia.
