= Kolu, Järva County =

Village in Estonia

Kolu
- Village
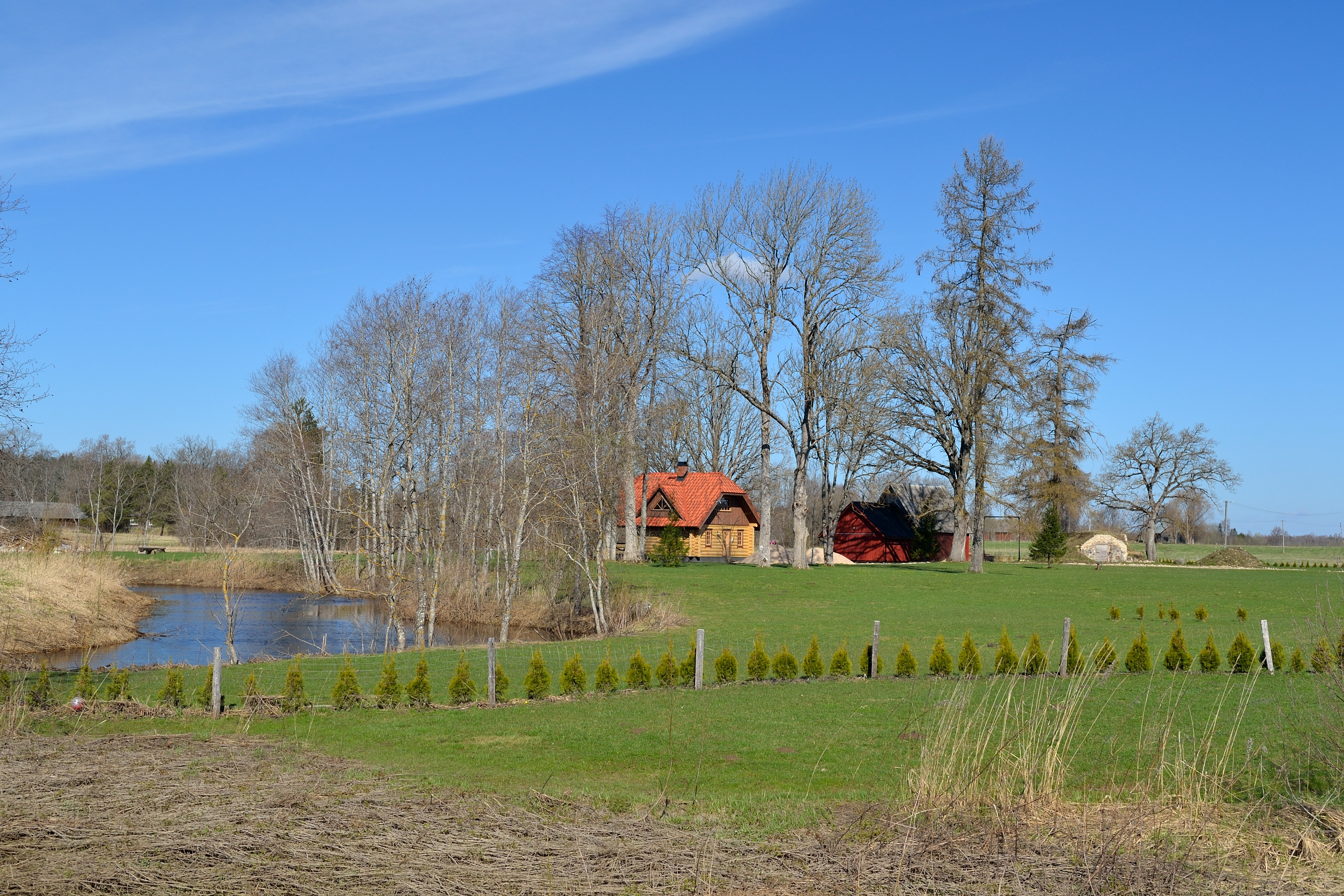

- Location in Estonia
- Coordinates: 58°47′55″N 25°15′53″E
- Country: Estonia
- County: Järva County
- Parish: Türi Parish
- Time zone: UTC+2 (EET)
  - Summer (DST): UTC+3 (EEST)

Kolu is a village in Türi Parish, Järva County in central Estonia. Kolu railway station on the Tallinn - Viljandi railway line operated by Elron (rail transit) is a short distance from the village.

== Kolu Manor ==
Kolu (German: Kollo) estate dates from 1639, when it was founded by Peter Grote. The Baltic German Grote (later Grotenhielm) family owned the property until 1875, after which it switched hands a few times before becoming a school in the 20th century. It is today private property. The main building was built 1888-1890 and designed by architect Erwin Bernhard. In 1905, after being devastated during riots during the Revolution of 1905, a corner tower was added to the building.
