= Mäeküla, Türi Parish =

Village in Estonia

Coordinates: 58°47′09″N 25°28′27″E

Mäeküla
- Village
- Interactive map of Mäeküla
- Country: Estonia
- County: Järva County
- Parish: Türi Parish
- Time zone: UTC+2 (EET)
  - Summer (DST): UTC+3 (EEST)

Mäeküla (German: Mehheküll) is a village in Türi Parish, Järva County in central Estonia.
