= Aasuvälja =

Aasuvälja may refer to the following places in Estonia:

- Aasuvälja, Järva County, village in Türi Parish, Järva County
- Aasuvälja, Lääne-Viru County, village in Vinni Parish, Lääne-Viru County
