= Poaka =

Village in Estonia

Coordinates: 58°50′N 25°30′E

- Village
- Interactive map of Poaka
- Country: Estonia
- County: Järva County
- Parish: Türi Parish
- Time zone: UTC+2 (EET)
  - Summer (DST): UTC+3 (EEST)

Poaka is a village in Türi Parish, Järva County in central Estonia. It lies near localities, such as Tori and Mõnnaku. Poaka, with the village situated at an elevation of around 68 meters above sea level and as of the most recent census of 2021 the village recorded a population of 127 residents.
