= Türi-Alliku =

Village in Estonia

Coordinates: 58°49′N 25°27′E

- Village
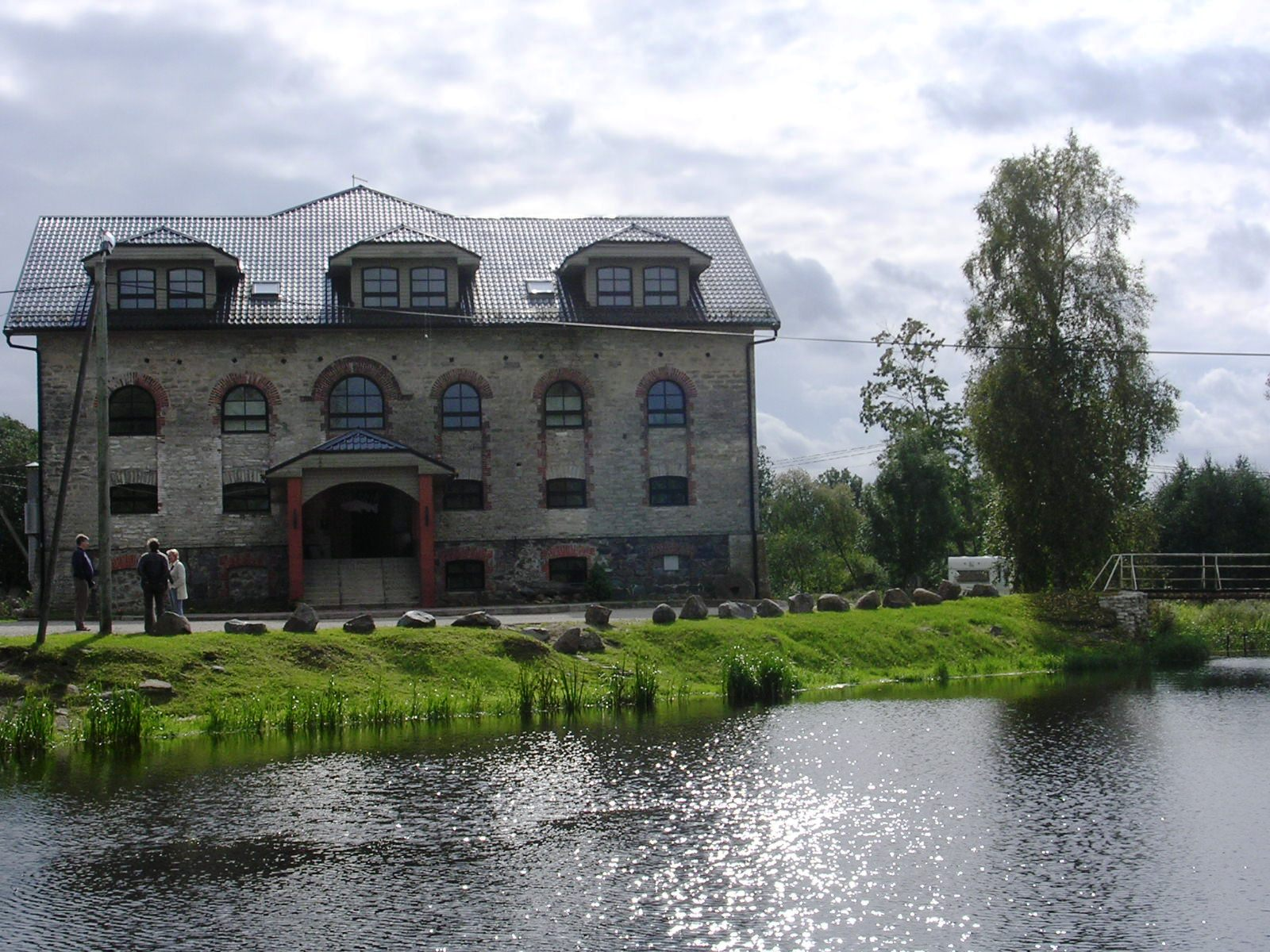
- Former watermill house now used as a hotel.
- Interactive map of Türi-Alliku
- Country: Estonia
- County: Järva County
- Parish: Türi Parish
- Time zone: UTC+2 (EET)
  - Summer (DST): UTC+3 (EEST)

Türi-Alliku (German: Allenküll) is a village in Türi Parish, Järva County in central Estonia.
