= Väljataguse, Järva County =

Village in Estonia

Coordinates: 58°54′N 25°26′E

Väljataguse
- Village
- Interactive map of Väljataguse
- Country: Estonia
- County: Järva County
- Parish: Türi Parish
- Time zone: UTC+2 (EET)
  - Summer (DST): UTC+3 (EEST)

Väljataguse is a village in Türi Parish, Järva County in central Estonia.
