= Lõõla =

Village in Estonia

- Village
- Location in Estonia
- Coordinates: 58°56′30″N 25°22′56″E
- Country: Estonia
- County: Järva County
- Municipality: Türi Parish

Population (2011 Census)
  - Total: 123
- Website: www.lõõla.ee

Lõõla is a village in Türi Parish, Järva County, in central Estonia. As of the 2011 census, the settlement's population was 123.

The largest dairy farm in the Baltic states, is located in the village of Lõõla. It is owned by Väätsa Agro and accommodates 2,200 milk cows.
