= Ülejõe, Türi Parish =

Village in Estonia

Coordinates: 58.88628°N 25.45833°E

Ülejõe
- Village
- Interactive map of Ülejõe
- Country: Estonia
- County: Järva County
- Parish: Türi Parish
- Time zone: UTC+2 (EET)
  - Summer (DST): UTC+3 (EEST)

Ülejõe is a village in Türi Parish, Järva County in central Estonia.
