= Villevere =

Village in Estonia

Coordinates: 58°39′N 25°29′E

- Village
- Interactive map of Villevere
- Country: Estonia
- County: Järva County
- Parish: Türi Parish
- Time zone: UTC+2 (EET)
  - Summer (DST): UTC+3 (EEST)

Villevere is a village in Türi Parish, Järva County in central Estonia.
