= Kärevere, Järva County =

Village in Estonia

Coordinates: 58°43′N 25°31′E

Kärevere
- Village
- Interactive map of Kärevere
- Country: Estonia
- County: Järva County
- Parish: Türi Parish
- Time zone: UTC+2 (EET)
  - Summer (DST): UTC+3 (EEST)

Kärevere (German: Kerrefer) is a village in Türi Parish, Järva County in central Estonia.

It has a railway station on the Tallinn - Viljandi railway line operated by Elron (rail transit).
