= Väljaotsa, Järva County =

Village in Estonia

Väljaotsa
- Village
- Location in Estonia
- Coordinates: 58°45′53″N 25°32′58″E
- Country: Estonia
- County: Järva County
- Parish: Türi Parish
- Time zone: UTC+2 (EET)
  - Summer (DST): UTC+3 (EEST)

Väljaotsa is a village in Türi Parish, Järva County in central Estonia.
