= Röa, Järva County =

Village in Estonia

Coordinates: 58°53′59″N 25°29′58″E

Röa
- Village
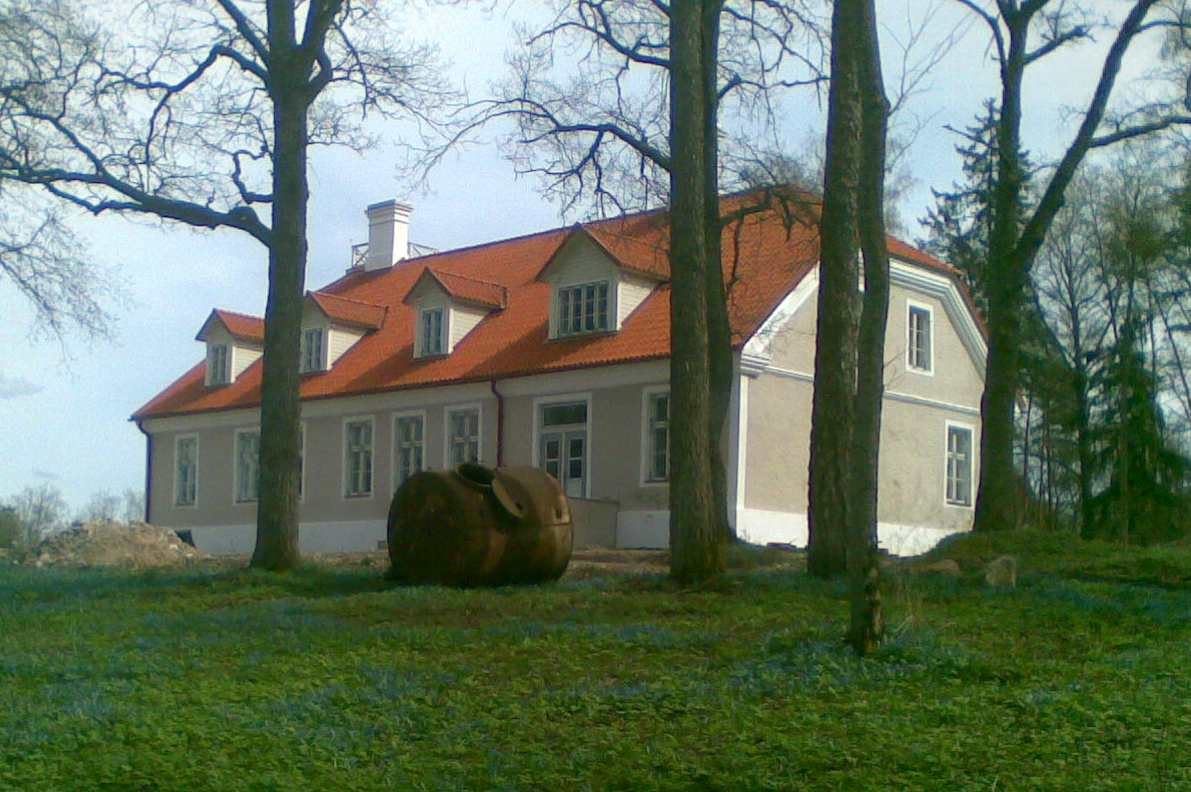
- Röa Manor
- Interactive map of Röa
- Country: Estonia
- County: Järva County
- Parish: Türi Parish
- Time zone: UTC+2 (EET)
  - Summer (DST): UTC+3 (EEST)

Röa is a village in Türi Parish, Järva County in central Estonia. Between 1991–2017 (until the administrative reform of Estonian municipalities) the village was located in Väätsa Parish.
