= Väinjärv =

Lake in Estonia

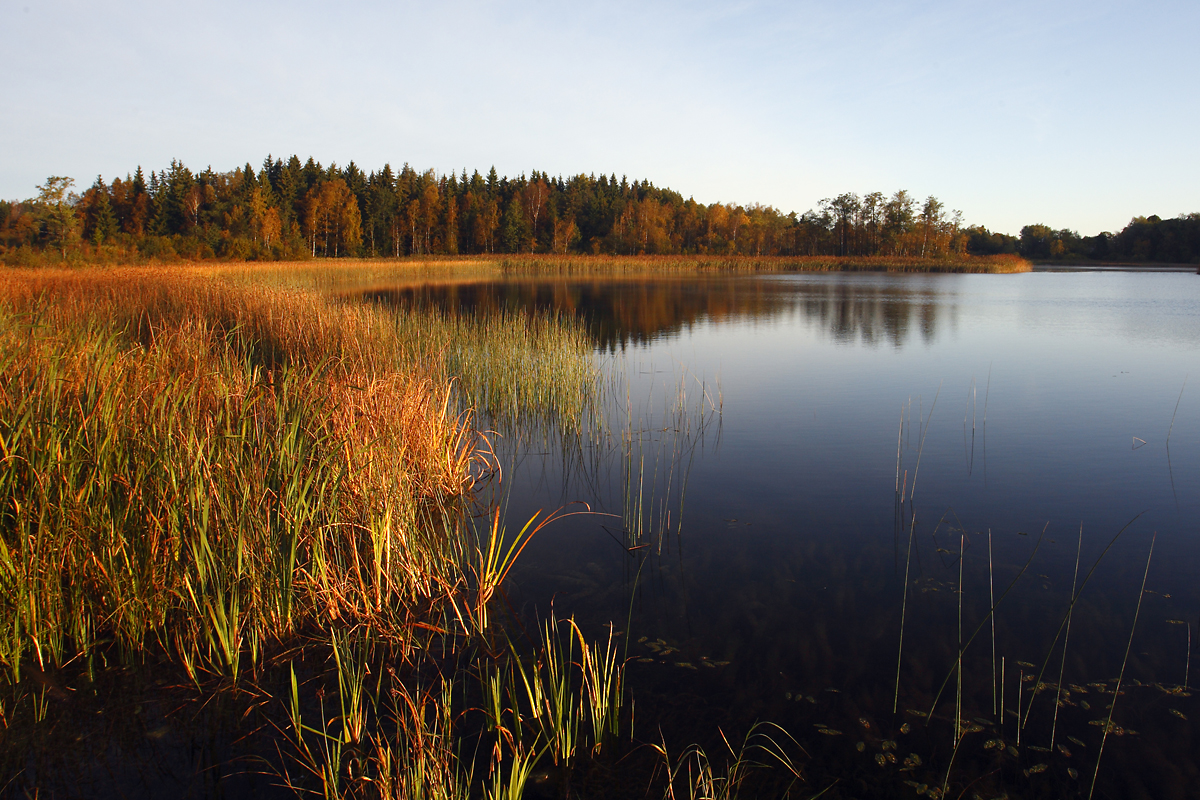

- Location within Estonia
- Coordinates: 58°56′24.01″N 26°5′14.57″E
- Basin countries: Estonia
- Max. length: 1,330 meters (4,360 ft)
- Surface area: 36.7 hectares (91 acres)
- Average depth: 5.6 meters (18 ft)
- Max. depth: 11.5 meters (38 ft)
- Water volume: 2,324,000 cubic meters (82,100,000 cu ft)
- Shore length^{1}: 4,760 meters (15,620 ft)
- Surface elevation: 80.0 meters (262.5 ft)
- Islands: 2
- ^{1} Shore length is not a well-defined measure.

Väinjärv (also known as Veinjärv) is a lake in Estonia. It is located in the village of Väinjärve in Järva Parish, Järva County. It is the largest lake in Järva County. It is an artificial lake.

== Physical description ==
The lake has an area of 36.7 hectares (91 acres), and it has two islands with a combined area of 1.1 hectares (2.7 acres). The lake has an average depth of 5.6 meters (18 ft). It is 1,330 meters (4,360 ft) long, and its shoreline measures 4,760 meters (15,620 ft). It has a volume of 2,324,000 cubic meters (82,100,000 cu ft).

== Gallery ==
Drone video of Väinjärv, July 2021

== See also ==
- List of lakes of Estonia
