= Türi Parish =

Municipality of Estonia (2017)

Coordinates: 58.8°N 25.933333°E

Türi Parish Türi vald
- Municipality of Estonia
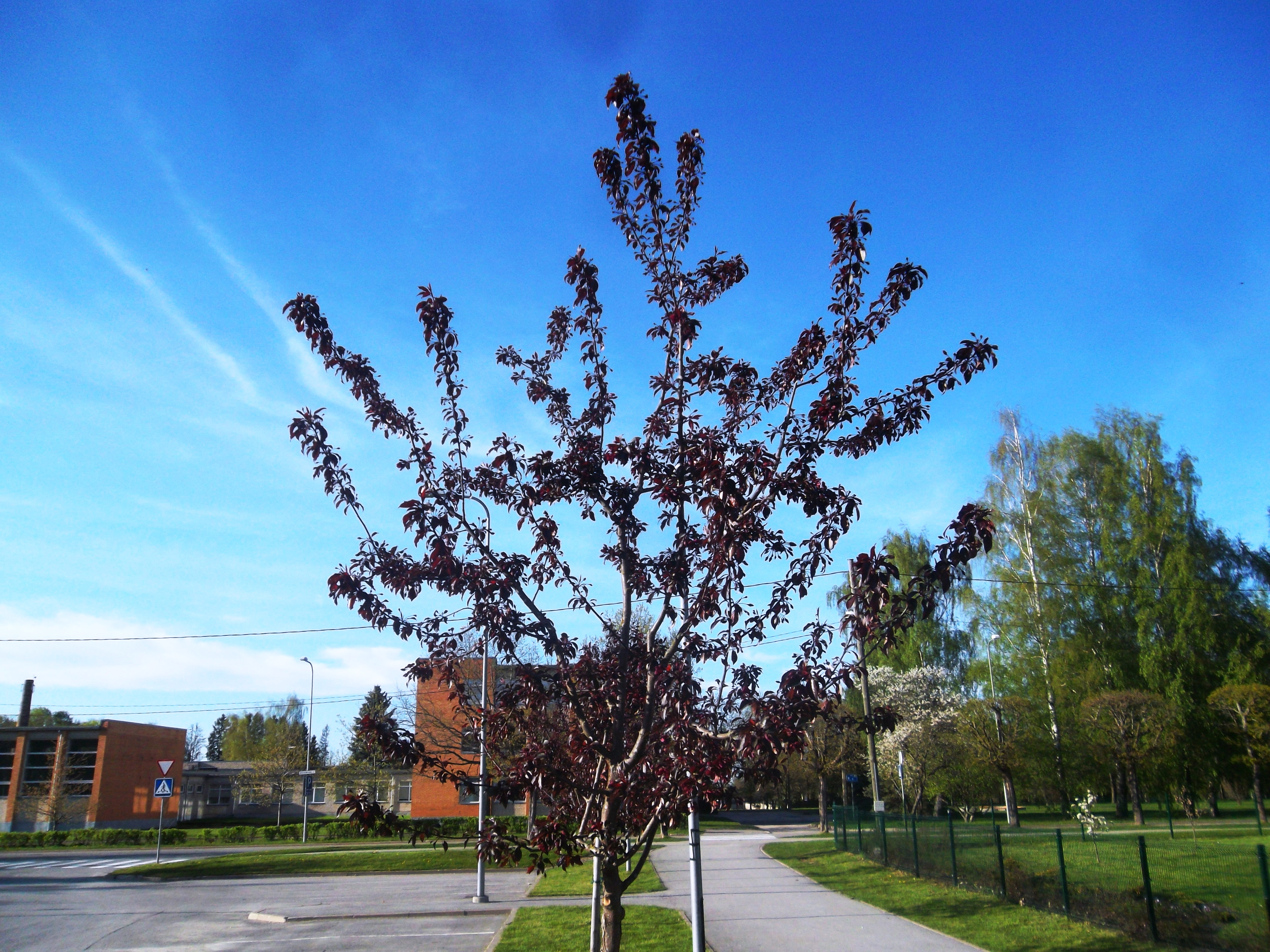
- Türi town

- Flag Coat of arms

- Türi Parish within Järva County.
- Country: Estonia
- County: Järva County
- Administrative centre: Türi

Area
  - Total: 1,008 km^{2} (389 sq mi)

Population (2022)
  - Total: 10,623
  - Density: 10.54/km^{2} (27.30/sq mi)
- ISO 3166 code: EE-834
- Website: www.tyri.ee

Türi Parish (Estonian: Türi Vald) is a rural municipality in Järva County, Estonia.

On 16 October 2005 Kabala Parish, Oisu Parish, Town of Türi and the former Türi Parish were united to form a new Türi Parish. In 2017 the parishes of Türi, Käru and Väätsa were united into the current Türi Parish.

== Settlements ==
There is 1 town (Türi), 4 small boroughs (Käru, Oisu, Särevere and Väätsa), and 53 villages in Türi Parish.

Villages

Aasuvälja, Äiamaa, Änari, Arkma, Jändja, Jõeküla, Kabala, Kädva, Kahala, Kändliku, Kärevere, Karjaküla, Kirna, Kõdu, Kolu, Kullimaa, Kurla, Laupa, Lauri, Lokuta, Lõõla, Lungu, Mäeküla, Meossaare, Metsaküla, Näsuvere, Ollepa, Pala, Pibari, Piiumetsa, Poaka, Põikva, Rassi, Raukla, Reopalu, Retla, Rikassaare, Röa, Roovere, Saareotsa, Sagevere, Saueaugu, Sonni, Taikse, Tännassilma, Tori, Türi-Alliku, Ülejõe, Väljaotsa, Väljataguse, Vilita, Villevere, Vissuvere.

== Religion ==
In terms of religion in the 2021 census, 8.2% of the municipality's residents declared themselves Lutheran, 2.1% declared themselves Orthodox, 1.2% other Christians. The majority of residents of the parish, 86.7% declared themselves religiously unaffiliated. 1.8 % of the population follows other religions or did not specify their religious affiliation.

== Twinned municipalities ==
Türi Parish is a member of the Douzelage, a town twinning association across the European Union. This active town twinning began in 1991 and there are regular events, such as a produce market from each of the other countries and festivals. Other members are:

- Agros, Cyprus
- Altea, Spain
- Asikkala, Finland
- Bad Kötzting, Germany
- Bellagio, Italy
- (Republic of Ireland) Bundoran, Ireland
- Chojna, Poland
- Granville, France
- Holstebro, Denmark
- Houffalize, Belgium
- Judenburg, Austria
- Kőszeg, Hungary
- Marsaskala, Malta
- Meerssen, Netherlands
- Niederanven, Luxembourg
- Oxelösund, Sweden
- Preveza, Greece
- Rokiškis, Lithuania
- Rovinj, Croatia
- Sesimbra, Portugal
- Sherborne, England, United Kingdom
- Sigulda, Latvia
- Siret, Romania
- Škofja Loka, Slovenia
- Sušice, Czech Republic
- Tryavna, Bulgaria
- Zvolen, Slovakia

Other twin municipalities of Türi Parish are:

- Åmål, Sweden
- Frogn, Norway
- Ingå, Finland
- Karkkila, Finland
- Loimaa, Finland
- Prienai, Lithuania
- Säkylä, Finland
- Siuntio, Finland

== Notable people ==
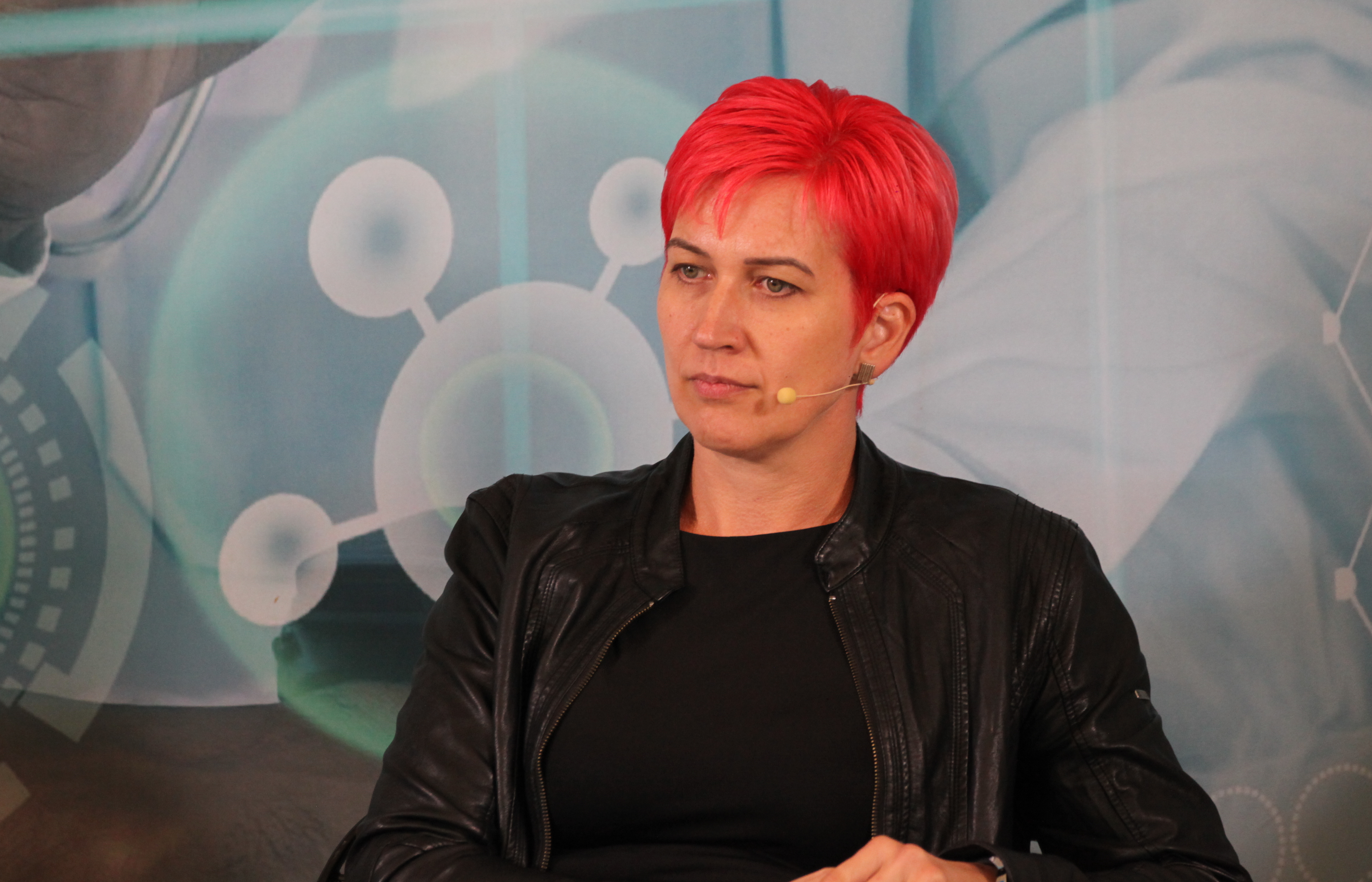
Pipi-Liis Siemann, 2021

- Eduard Aule (1878 in Kabala – 1947), politician and president of the Bank of Estonia, 1921 to 1925
- August Rei (1886 in Kurla – 1963), politician, State Elder of Estonia, from 1928 to 1929
- Jüri Vilms (1889 in Arkma – 1918), the first Deputy Prime Minister of the Republic of Estonia.
- Jüri Lossmann (1891 in Kabala – 1984), long-distance runner, silver medallist in the marathon at the 1920 Summer Olympics
- Ragnar Nurkse (1907 in Käru – 1959), economist and policy maker, pioneer of Balanced Growth Theory
- Harald Nugiseks (1921 in Karjaküla – 2014), serviceman in the Nazi Waffen-SS in WWII
- Jaan Eilart (1933 in Pala – 2006), a phytogeographer, landscape ecologist, cultural historian and conservationist.
- Laine Erik (1942 in Särevere – 2024), an agricultural scientist and middle-distance runner.
- Pipi-Liis Siemann (born 1975 in Retla), politician, member of the XV Riigikogu and Mayor of Türi Parish, 2012 to 2021.
