= Änari =

Village in Estonia

Coordinates: 58°51′N 25°22′E

- Village
- Interactive map of Änari
- Country: Estonia
- County: Järva County
- Parish: Türi Parish
- Time zone: UTC+2 (EET)
  - Summer (DST): UTC+3 (EEST)

Änari is a village in Türi Parish, Järva County in central Estonia.
