= Roovere =

Village in Estonia

Coordinates: 58°53′N 25°19′E

- Village
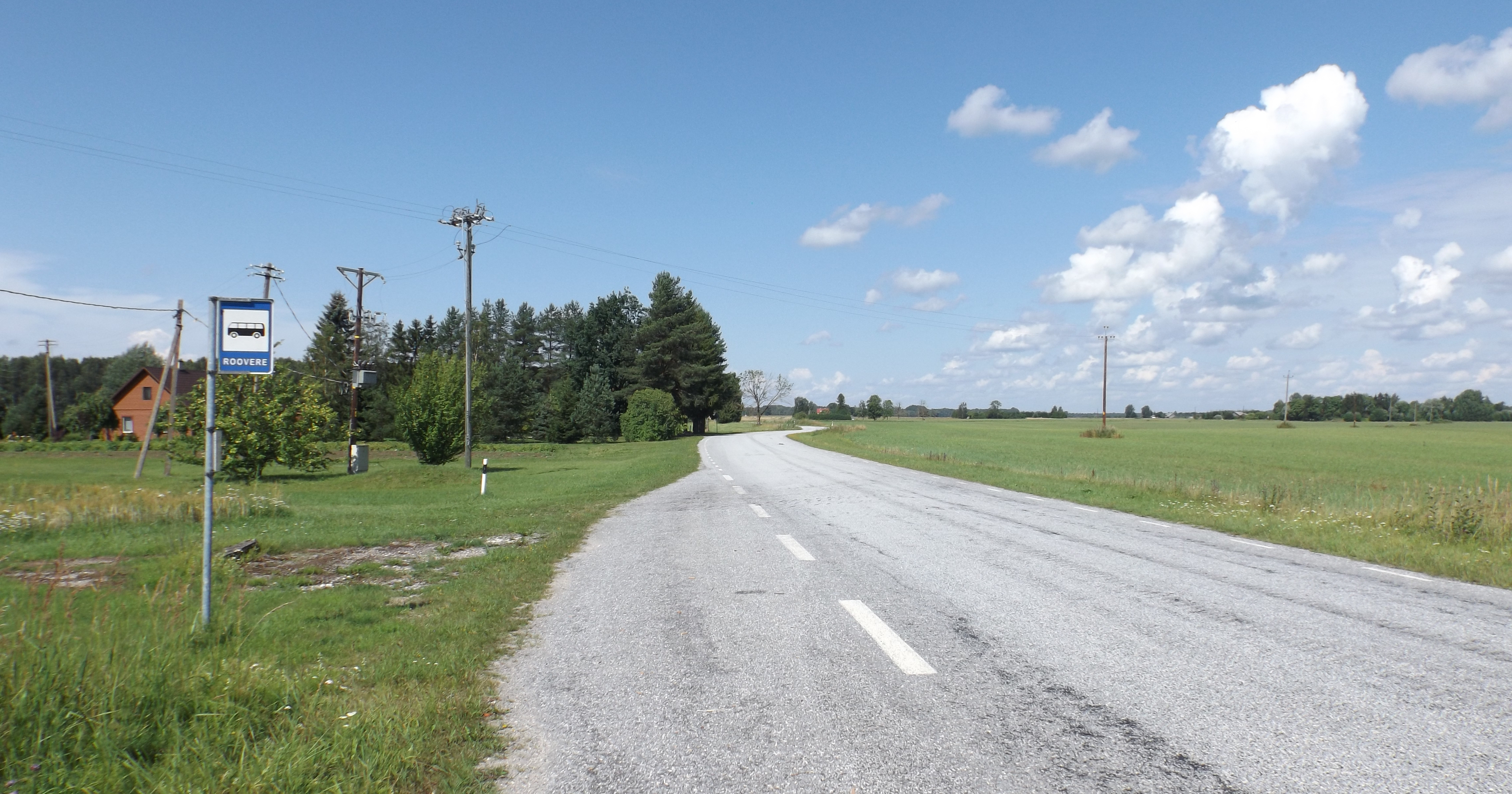
- Roovere, Järva county, central Estonia
- Interactive map of Roovere
- Country: Estonia
- County: Järva County
- Parish: Türi Parish
- Time zone: UTC+2 (EET)
  - Summer (DST): UTC+3 (EEST)

Roovere is a village in Türi Parish, Järva County in central Estonia.
