= Anari, Iranshahr =

Anari اناري
- Village
- Location within Iran
- Coordinates: 27°03′12″N 61°02′45″E
- Country: Iran
- Province: Sistan and Baluchestan
- County: Iranshahr
- Bakhsh: Central
- Rural District: Abtar

Population (2006)
  - Total: 76
- Time zone: UTC+3:30 (IRST)
  - Summer (DST): UTC+4:30 (IRDT)

Anari (Persian: اناري, also Romanized as Anārī) is a village in Abtar Rural District, in the Central District of Iranshahr County, Sistan and Baluchestan Province, Iran. At the 2006 census, its population was 76, in 17 families.
