= Väljaotsa, Jõgeva County =

Village in Estonia

Coordinates: 58°42′51″N 26°22′33″E

Väljaotsa
- Village
- Interactive map of Väljaotsa
- Country: Estonia
- County: Jõgeva County
- Parish: Jõgeva Parish
- Time zone: UTC+2 (EET)
  - Summer (DST): UTC+3 (EEST)

Väljaotsa is a village in Jõgeva Parish, Jõgeva County in eastern Estonia.
