= Vissuvere, Järva County =

Village in Estonia

Coordinates: 58°56′22″N 25°24′39″E

Vissuvere
- Village
- Interactive map of Vissuvere
- Country: Estonia
- County: Järva County
- Parish: Türi Parish
- Time zone: UTC+2 (EET)
  - Summer (DST): UTC+3 (EEST)

Vissuvere (German: Wissofer) is a village in Türi Parish, Järva County in central Estonia.
