= Järva County =

County of Estonia

Coordinates: 58°53′N 25°33′E

Järva County Järvamaa
- County
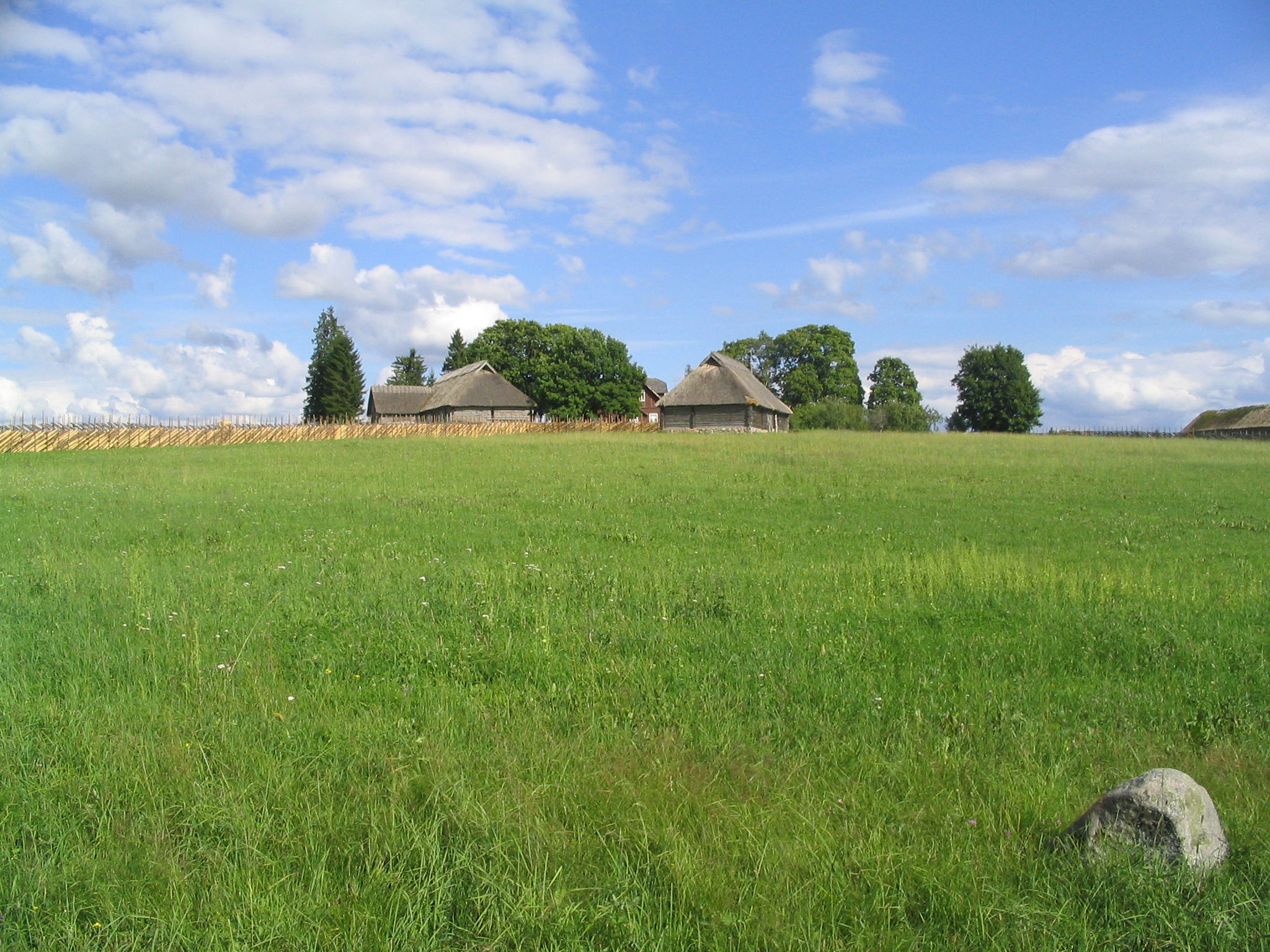

- Flag Coat of arms

- Country: Estonia
- Capital: Paide

Area
  - Total: 2,459.58 km^{2} (949.65 sq mi)

Population (2022)
  - Total: 29,693
  - Rank: 12th
  - Density: 12.072/km^{2} (31.267/sq mi)

Ethnicity (2023)
  - Estonians: 92.7%
  - Ukrainians: 3.1%
  - Russians: 2.3%
  - Other: 2.0%

GDP
  - Total: €610 million (2022)
  - Per capita: €20,405 (2022)
- ISO 3166 code: EE-52
- Vehicle registration: P

Järva County (Estonian: Järva maakond or Järvamaa; German: Jerwen; Latin: Jervia) is one of 15 counties of Estonia. It is located in the central part of the country, and it borders Lääne-Viru County to the east, Jõgeva County to the southeast, Viljandi County to the south, Pärnu County to the southwest, Rapla County to the west, and Harju County to the north. Residents of Järva County are called Järvamaalased. In 2022, Järva County had a population of 29,693, constituting 2.7% of the total population in Estonia.

== History ==
In the first centuries AD, political and administrative subdivisions began to emerge. Two larger subdivisions appeared: the parish (kihelkond) and the county (maakond). The parish consisted of several villages. Nearly all parishes had at least one fortress. The defense of the local area was directed by the highest official, the parish elder. The county was composed of several parishes, also headed by an elder. By the 13th century, the following major districts had developed in Estonia: Saaremaa (Osilia), Läänemaa (Rotalia or Maritima), Harjumaa (Harria), Rävala (Revalia), Virumaa (Vironia), Järvamaa (Jervia), Sakala (Saccala), and Ugandi (Ugaunia).

=== County government ===
Until 2017, the County Government (Estonian: maavalitsus) was led by Governor (Estonian: maavanem), who was appointed by the Government of Estonia for a term of five years. Since 2014, the Governor position was held by Alo Aasma.

== Municipalities ==
The county is subdivided into municipalities. There are two rural municipalities (Estonian: vallad 'parishes') and one urban municipality (Estonian: linnad 'towns') in Järva County.

The county has two towns - Paide and Türi, and one borough - Järva-Jaani. There are also 10 small boroughs in the county, the largest of which is Koeru. There are 217 villages in Järvamaa, the largest of which is Türi-Alliku, with a population of 357.

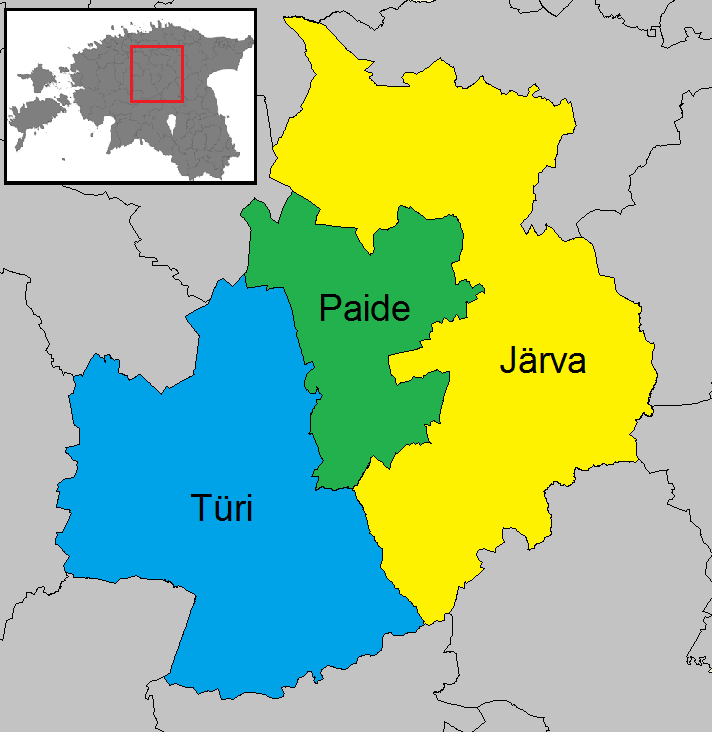
Municipalities of Järva County

Rank	Municipality	Type	Population (2018)	Area km^{2}	Density
1	Järva Parish	Rural	9,121	1,223	7.5
2	Paide	Urban	10,898	443	24.6
3	Türi Parish	Rural	11,063	1,009	11.0

== Religion ==
The Lutheran congregations in the county are under the Järva Deanery of the Estonian Evangelical Lutheran Church.

Orthodox congregations in the county are predominantly under the administration of the Estonian Apostolic Orthodox Church but also one of them is under the Estonian Orthodox Church of the Moscow Patriarchate.

Catholic masses are also held regularly in Paide.

Other Christian congregations such as Baptists, Methodists, Jehovah's Witnesses, and other Christian congregations operate in the county.

Religious affiliations in Järva County, census 2000–2021*
Religion	2000		2011		2021	
Religion	Number	%	Number	%	Number	%
Christianity	5,647	18.3	3,774	14.6	3,250	12.9
—Orthodox Christians	542	1.7	584	2.2	530	2.1
—Lutherans	4,544	14.7	2,655	10.2	1,960	7.8
—Catholics	64	0.2	40	0.1	270	1.1
—Baptists	174	0.5	90	0.3	120	0.4
—Jehovah's Witnesses	172	0.5	164	0.6	110	0.4
—Pentecostals	47	0.1	28	0.1	50	0.2
—Old Believers	3	0.01	6	0.02	-	-
—Methodists	37	0.1	22	0.08	20	0.08
—Adventists	64	0.2	44	0.1	30	0.1
—Other Christians	-	-	153	0.6	160	0.6
Islam	8	0.02	4	0.01	-	-
Buddhism	-	-	10	0.03	20	0.08
Other religions**	201	0.6	160	0.6	340	1.3
No religion	14,796	48.0	18,694	72.2	18,890	74.9
Not stated***	10,166	33.0	3,165	12.2	2,610	10.3
Total population*	30,818		25,865		25,210	
*The censuses of Estonia count the religious affiliations of the population older than 15 years of age. ".

== Images ==
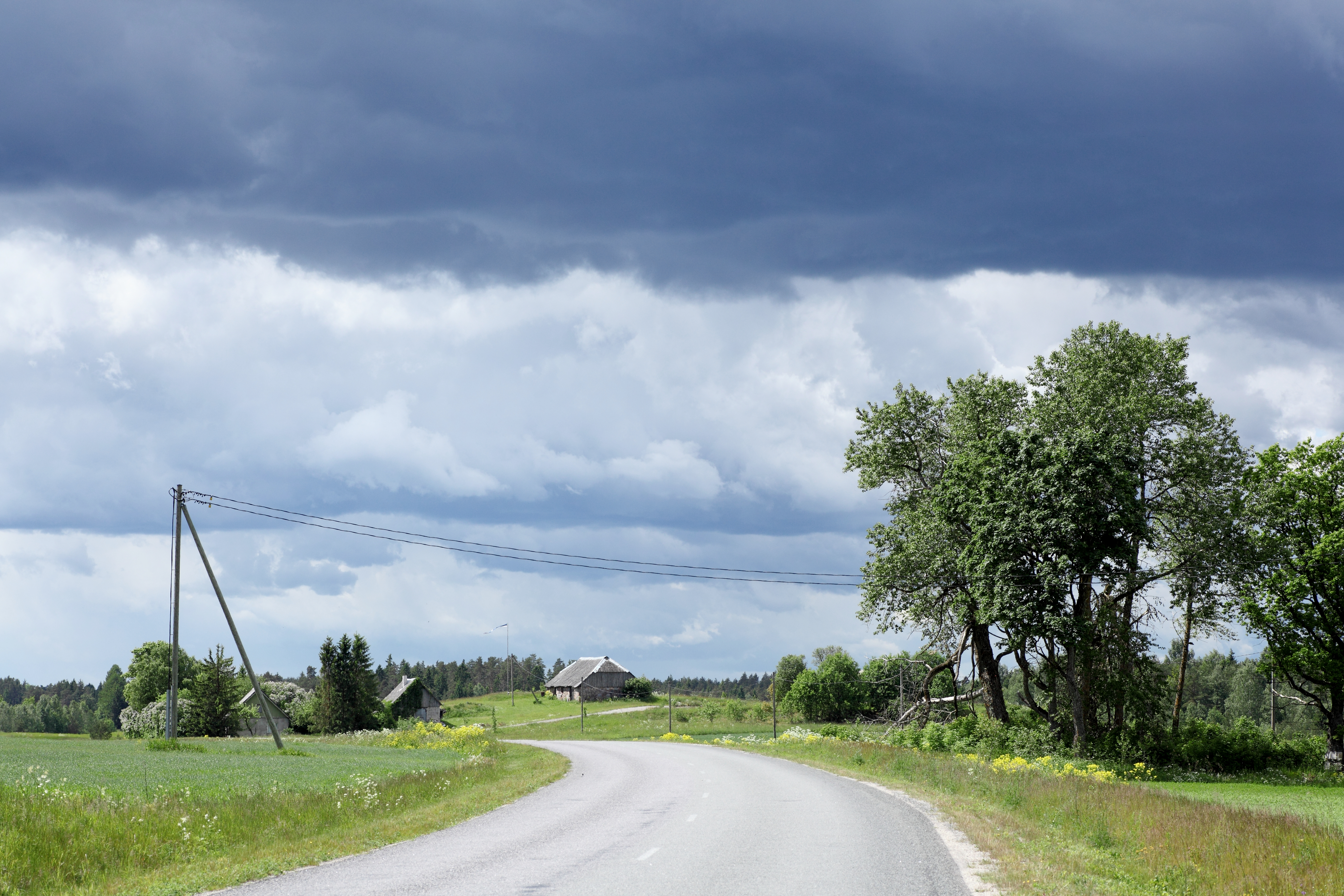
The northern part of the county

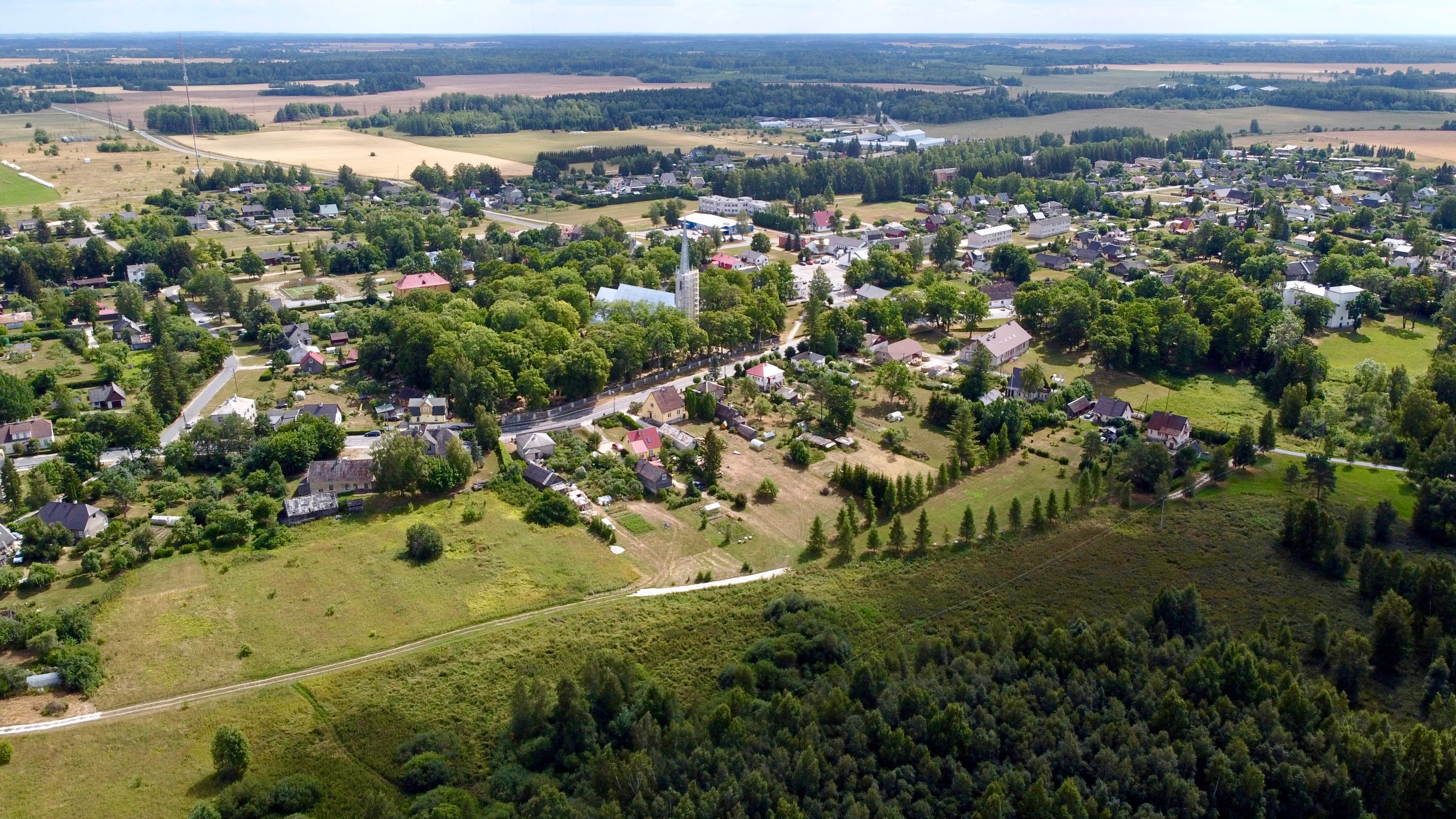
Järva-Jaani

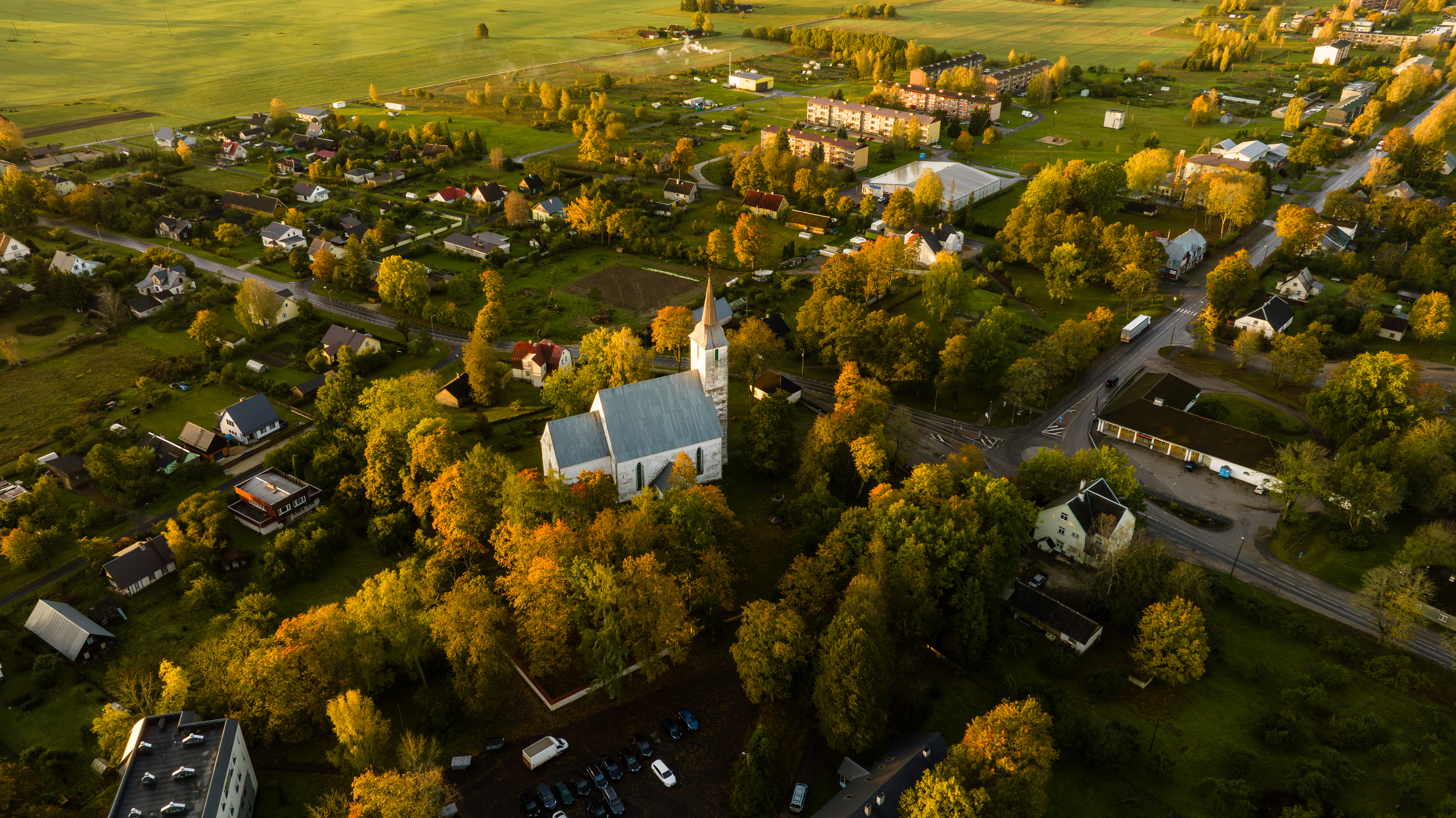
Koeru

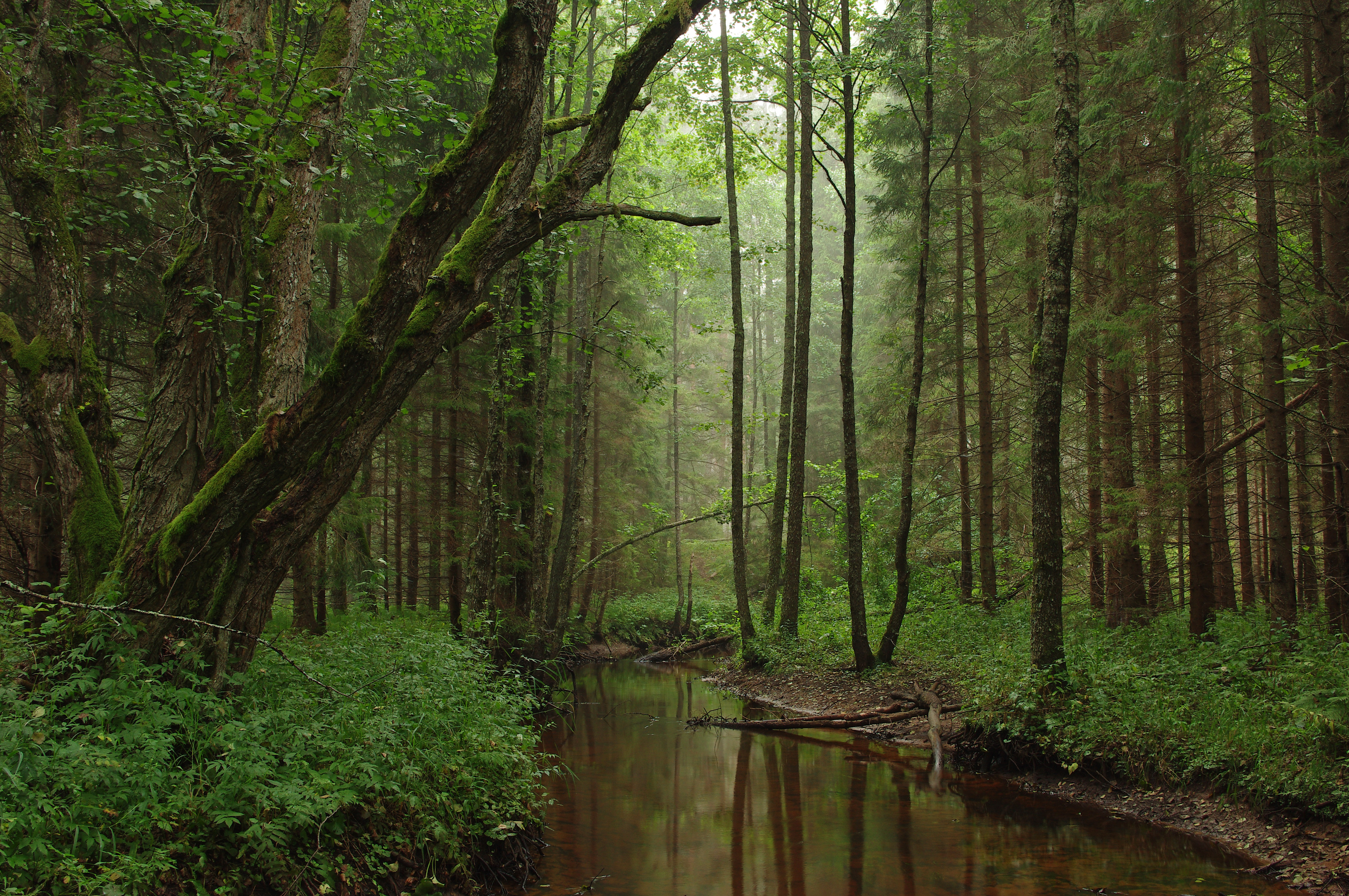
Tarvasjõgi river in Kõrvemaa Nature Park

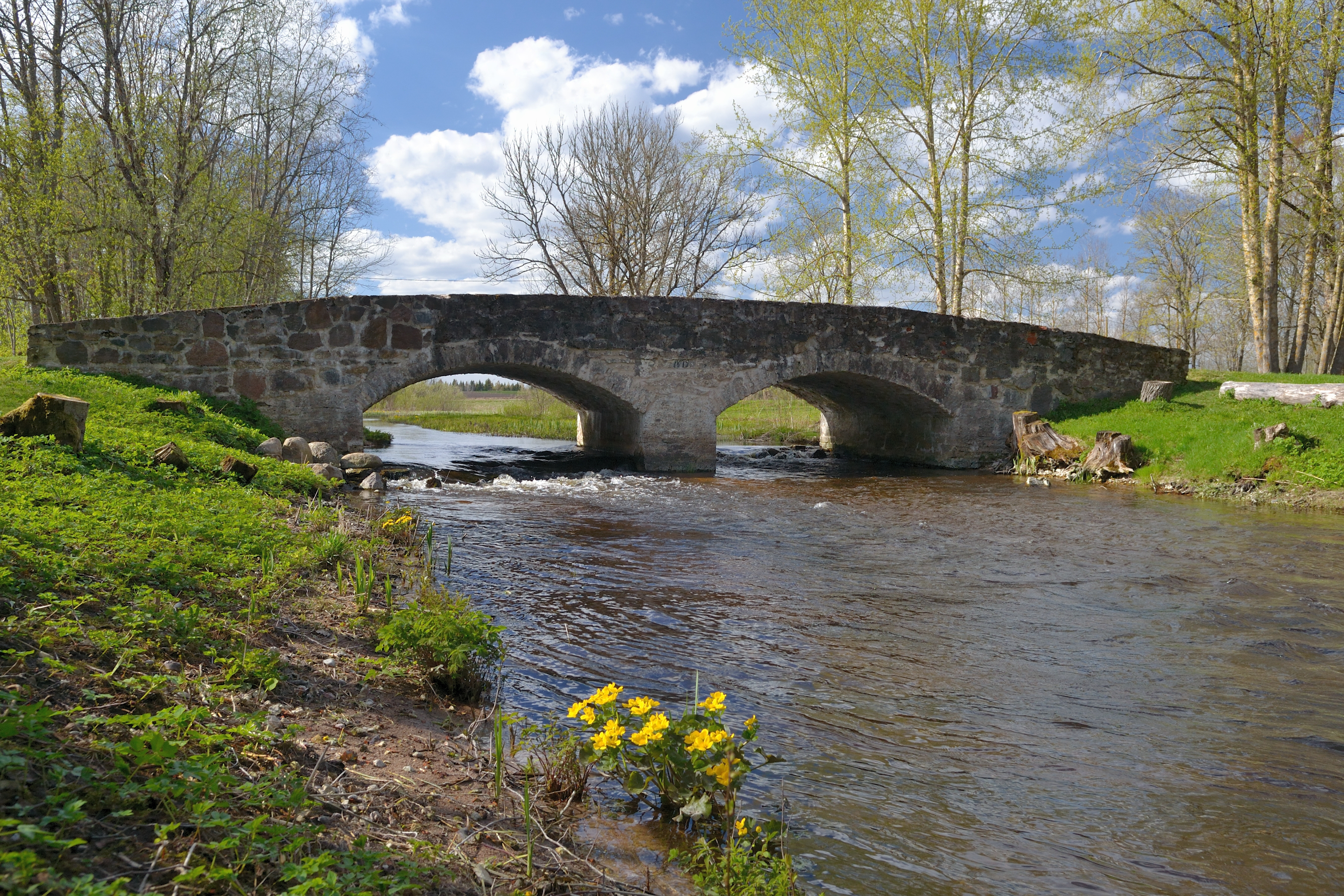
Albu manor stone bridge on Ambla River, built in 1879

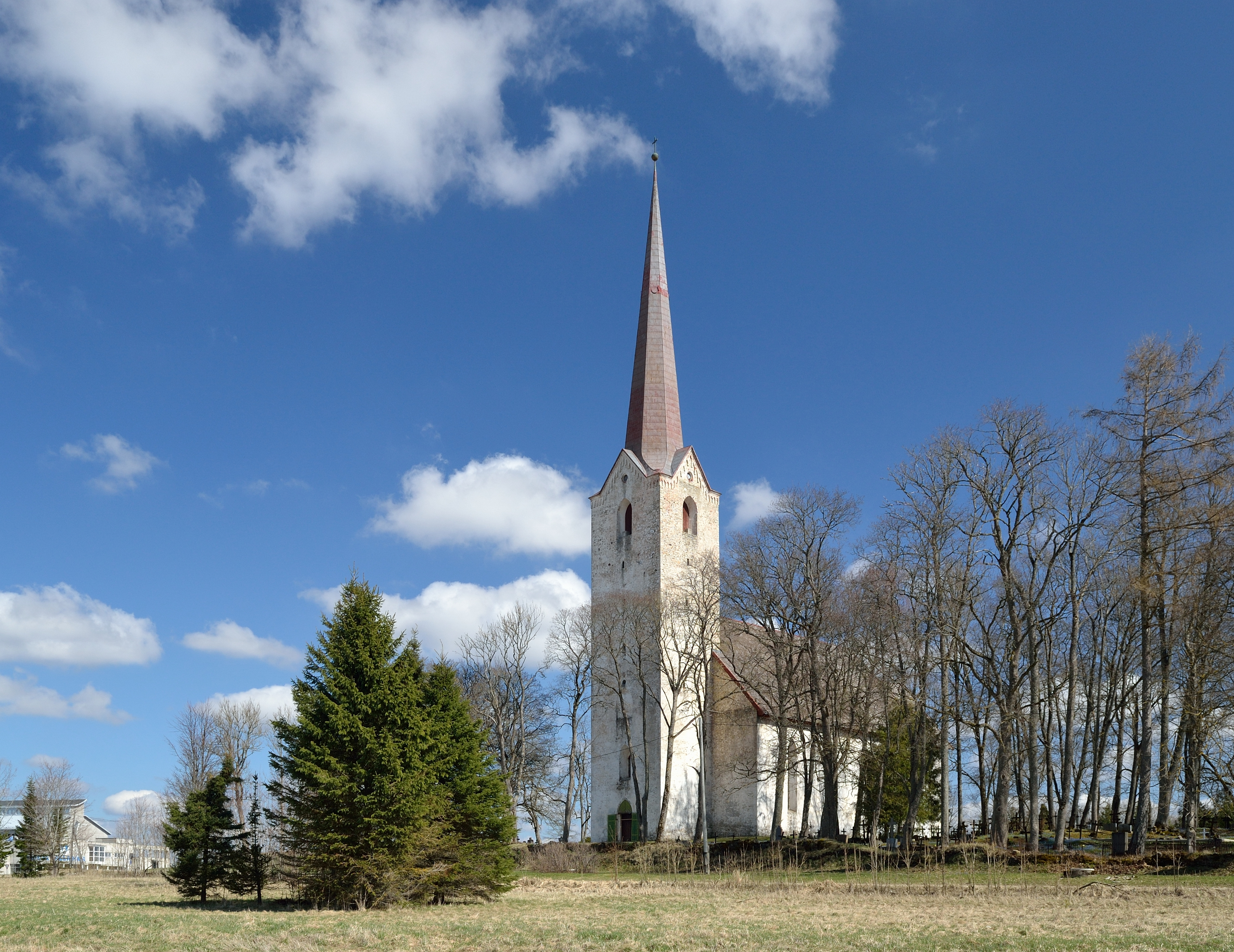
Järva-Peetri church

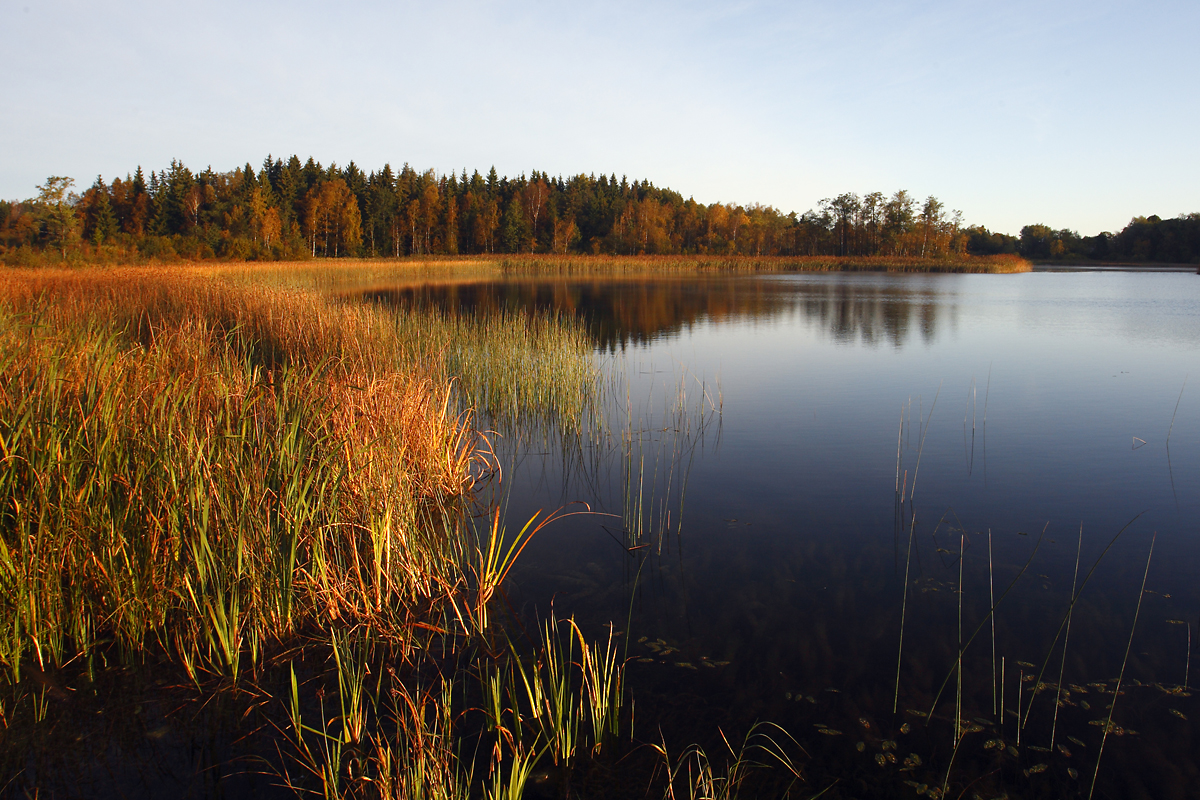
Lake Väinjärv

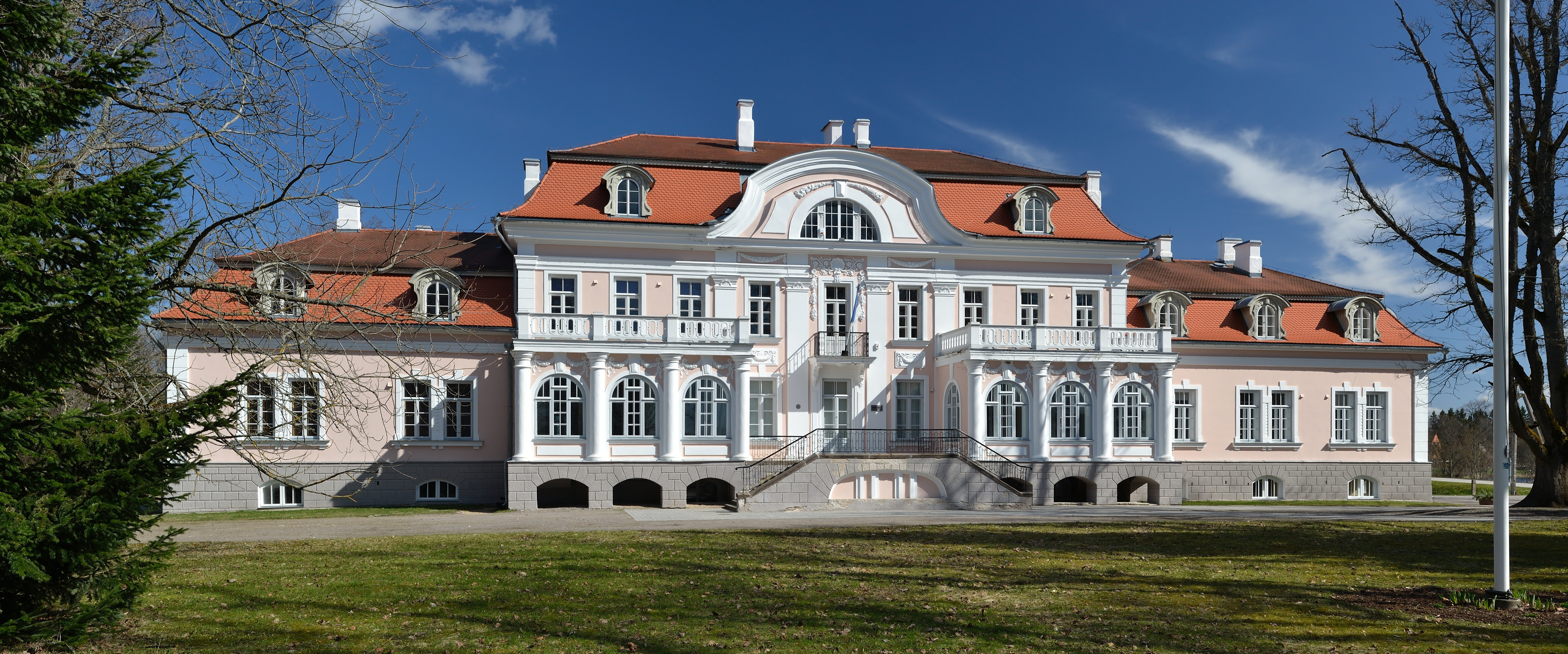
Laupa manor

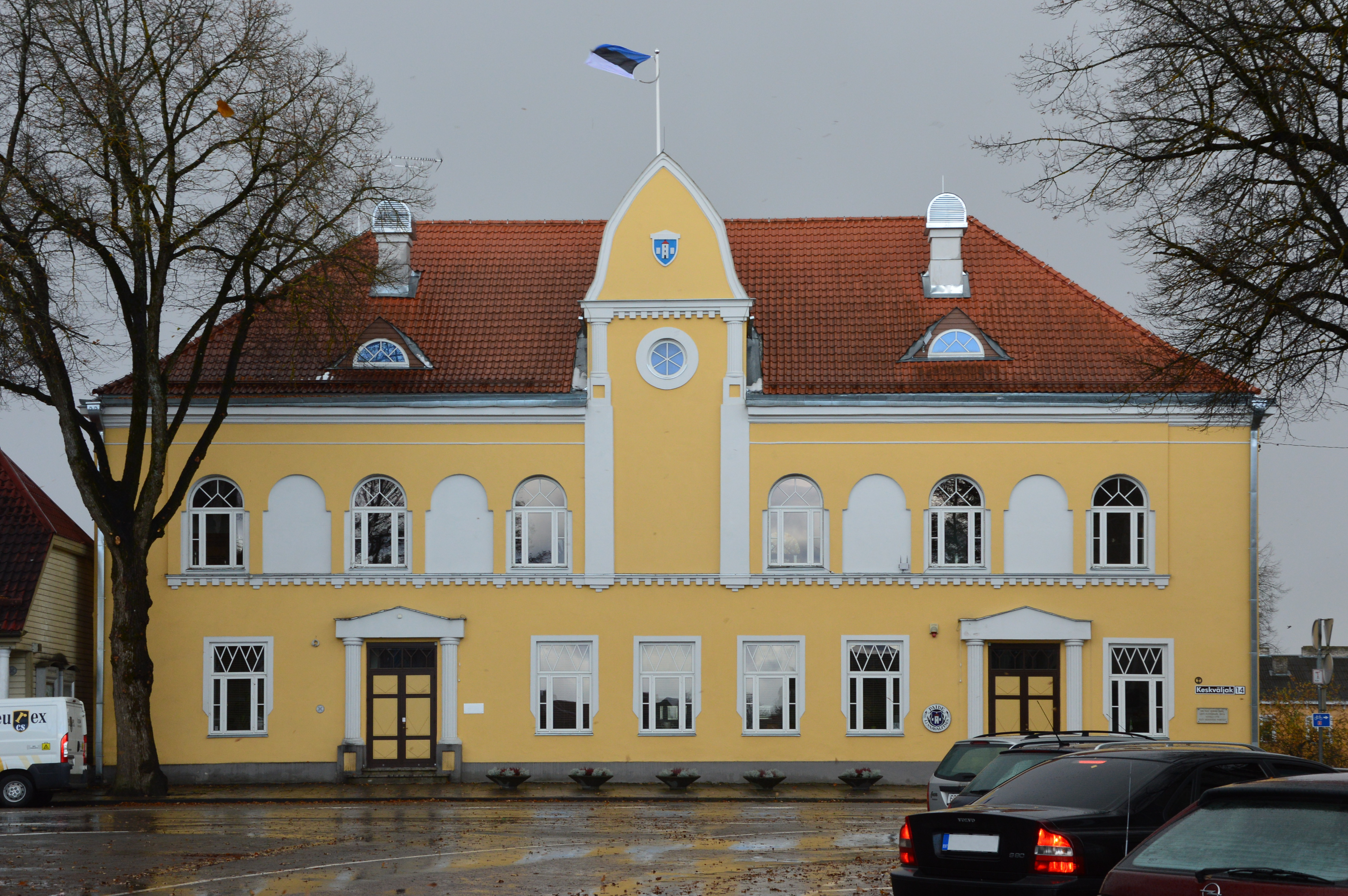
Paide Town Hall

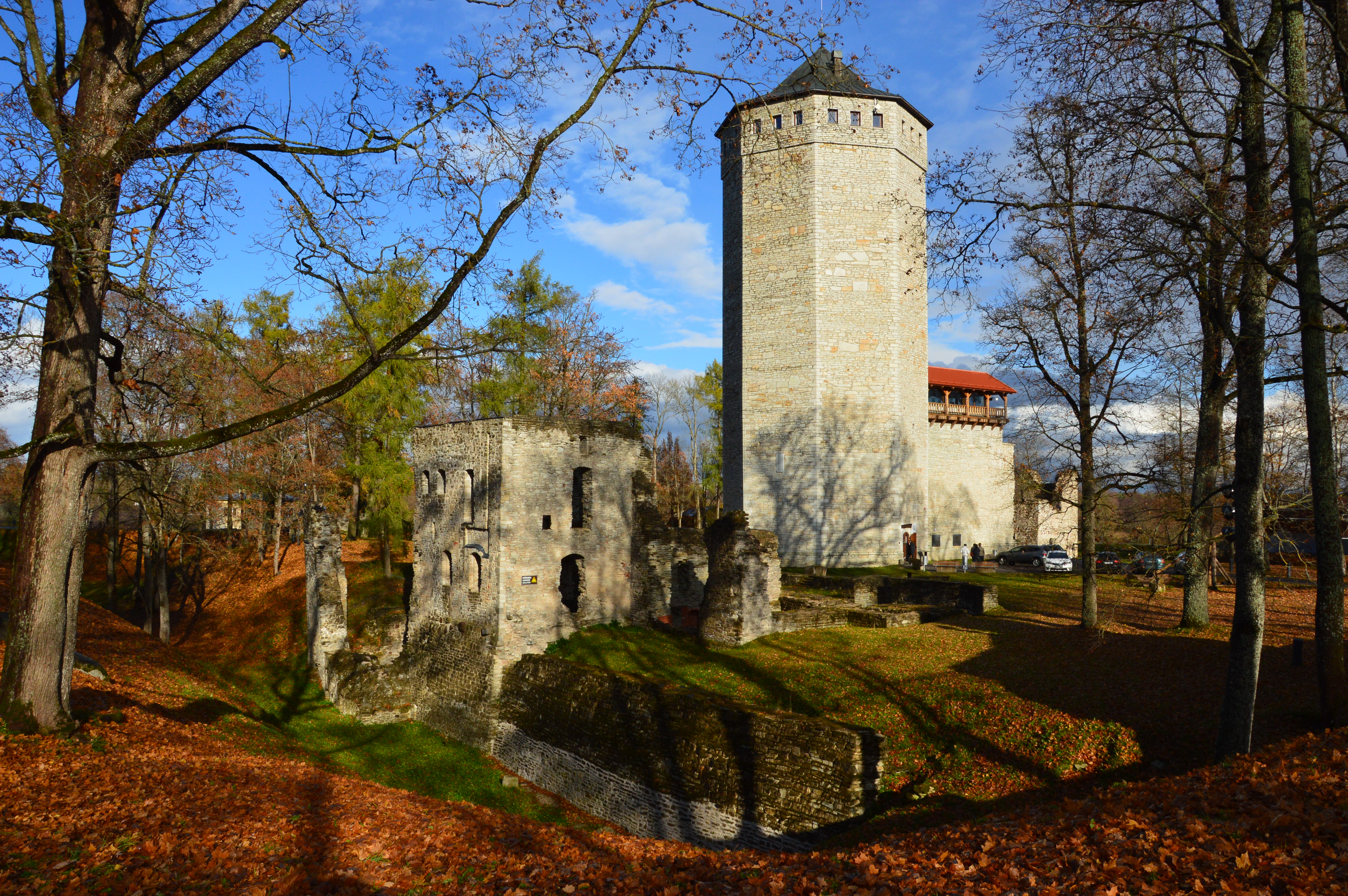
Paide Castle
