= List of Italian-American entertainers =

This is a list of Italian American entertainers.

== Composers and conductors ==
- Alfredo Antonini
- Trey Anastasio
- Frankie Avalon
- Angelo Badalamenti
- Josefina Benedetti
- Joe Bonamassa
- Jon Bon Jovi
- Curt Cacioppo
- Teddy Castellucci
- Mario Castelnuovo Tedesco
- Giancarlo Castro D'Addona
- Lou Christie
- Russ Columbo
- Bill Conti
- Anton Coppola
- Carmine Coppola
- John Corigliano
- Chick Corea
- Don Costa
- Glen Danzig
- Bobby Darin
- Norman Dello Joio
- Vince DiCola
- Carmen Dragon
- JoAnn Falletta
- John Ferritto
- Nicolas Flagello
- Dominic Frontiere
- Michael Giacchino
- Buddy Greco
- George Greeley
- Vittorio Giannini
- Vince Guaraldi
- Giuseppe Guttoveggio
- Chris Isaak
- Alicia Keys
- Guy Lombardo
- Henry Mancini
- David Mancuso
- Chuck Mangione
- Giancarlo Menotti
- Giorgio Moroder
- Francesco Maria Scala
- Dario Marianelli
- Natalie Merchant
- Tom Morello
- Joe Perry
- Leonard Pennario
- Martin Perna
- John Petrucci
- Al Piantadosi
- Louis Prima
- Suzi Quatro
- Nicola Rescigno
- L. Scinti Roger
- Pete Rugolo
- Jeff Russo
- Thom Russo
- Bobby Rydell
- Joe Satriani
- Alan Silvestri
- Ray Sinatra
- Robert Spano
- Nikki Sixx
- Dick Stabile
- Glenn Scarpelli
- Terig Tucci
- Arturo Toscanini
- Steven Tyler
- Steve Vai
- Jerry Vale
- Frank Zappa

== Models ==
- Lily Aldridge
- Ruby Aldridge
- Alessandra Ambrosio
- Hailey Baldwin
- Brian Bianchini
- Alyssa Campanella
- Gia Carangi (1960–1986)
- Anthony Catanzaro
- Olivia Culpo
- Adrianne Curry
- Lil Debbie
- Charles Dera
- Emily Didonato
- Christine Dolce
- CJ Gibson
- Vanessa Hessler
- Willa Holland
- Laura Lyons
- Jonathon Prandi
- Claudia Romani
- Isabella Rossellini
- Elettra Rossellini Wiedemann
- Amanda Sudano

== Theater directors ==
- Gerard Alessandrini
- Michael Bennett
- Lawrence Carra
- Michael Cassara
- Bart DeLorenzo
- Frank Ferrante
- Leonard Foglia
- Albert Innaurato
- Joe Mantello
- Tom Palumbo
- John Rando

== Movie directors and producers ==
- Emile Ardolino (1943-1993), filmmaker, choreographer and producer
- Annabelle Attanasio (born 1993), actress and filmmaker, daughter of producer Paul Attanasio
- Paul Attanasio (born 1959), screenwriter and film and television producer
- Joseph Barbera (1911–2006), Oscar and Emmy-winning animation director and producer (Hanna-Barbera Productions)
- Greg Berlanti (born 1972), writer, producer and film director, known for his work on the television series Dawson's Creek and Riverdale
- Ed Bianchi (born 1942), television director and producer. He is better known for his work on Deadwood, Boardwalk Empire
- Frank Borzage (1893–1962), film director and actor famed for his mystical romanticism. The first person to win the Academy Award for Best Director for his film 7th Heaven (1927) at the 1st Academy Awards.
- Albert R. Broccoli (1909–1996), producer of all but one of the first 17 James Bond movies
- Barbara Broccoli (born 1960), producer, daughter of producer Albert R. Broccoli
- Nicolas Cage, actor, director and producer
- Frank Capra (1897–1991), film director and a major creative force behind a number of popular films of the 1930s and 1940s
- David Chase (born 1945), creator of The Sopranos
- Michael Cimino (1939–2016), film director, The Deer Hunter
- Chris Columbus (born 1958), film director, Home Alone
- Francis Ford Coppola (born 1939), five-time Academy Award-winning film director, producer, and screenwriter
- Roman Coppola (born 1965), film and music video director
- Sofia Coppola (born 1971), director, actress, producer
- Frank Coraci (born 1966), film director
- Gerard Damiano (1928–2008), former adult film director
- Pat DiCicco (1909–1978), movie producer, and occasional actor, as well as an alleged mobster working for Lucky Luciano
- Raymond De Felitta (born 1964), independent film director, screenwriter and musician
- Barbara De Fina (born 1949), film director
- Dino De Laurentiis (1919–2010), film producer. He produced or co-produced more than 500 films, of which 38 were nominated for Academy Awards
- Brian De Palma (born 1940), movie director
- Tom DeSanto (born 1968), film producer
- Danny DeVito (born 1944), actor, director, and Oscar-nominated producer
- Tom Savini (born 1946) actor, prosthetic makeup artist, director
- Denise Di Novi (born 1956), film producer
- Anthony C. Ferrante, film director
- Abel Ferrara (born 1951), film director
- Vincent Gallo (born 1962), movie actor and director starring in independent movies; also a recognized painter, male fashion model, musician, motorcycle racer and breakdancer
- Gregory La Cava (1892–1952), film director of the 1930s
- Walter Lantz (1899–1994), Oscar-winning animation director and producer, creator of Woody Woodpecker
- John R. Leonetti, director, cinematographer
- Matthew F. Leonetti, cinematographer
- Garry Marshall, TV and film producer, director, writer, and actor
- Theodore Melfi, screenwriter, film director, and producer
- Vincente Minnelli, director
- Greg Mottola, director
- Nicholas Pileggi (born 1933), film director
- Robert Pulcini, film director
- Frank Renzulli, actor, writer and producer
- Lou Romano, member of the Art Department at Pixar Animation Studios
- David O. Russell (born 1958), film director
- Russo brothers, film and television directors
- Aaron Russo, film producer
- SallyAnn Salsano, executive producer, known for Jersey Shore
- Damon Santostefano
- Martin Scorsese (born 1942), iconic Academy Award-winning film director
- Tina Sinatra (born 1948), movie producer and former actress
- Quentin Tarantino (born 1963), film director, actor, and Oscar-winning screenwriter
- Marlo Thomas (born 1937), actress, producer, author, and social activist
- Stanley Tucci (born 1960), actor, writer, film producer and film director
- Luigi Vendittelli, film maker, documentalist
- Thomas Vitale, Senior Vice President of Programming & Original Movies for the Sci Fi Channel
- Robert Zemeckis, filmmaker and screenwriter

== Television personalities ==
- Farrah Abraham (born 1991), reality TV star
- Aquaria (born: Giovanni Palandrani, 1996), drag queen
- Maria Bello (born 1967), actress
- Mike Bongiorno (1924–2009), television host. After a few experiences in the US, he started working on RAI in the 1950s and was considered to be the most popular host in Italy.
- Ruth Buzzi (1936–2025), actress, singer and comedian. She was best known for her performances on the comedy-variety show Rowan & Martin's Laugh-In from 1968 to 1973
- Carmine Gotti Agnello (born 1986), reality TV star
- Frank Gotti Agnello (born 1990), reality TV star
- John Gotti Agnello (born 1987), reality TV star
- Michael Carbonaro (born 1976) actor, magician, and improv artist
- Adam Carolla (born 1964), comedic radio and television personality
- Kristin Cavallari (born 1987)[, television personality, fashion entrepreneur and author
- Neil Cavuto (born 1958), television host and commentator hosting Your World with Neil Cavuto and Cavuto on Business on the Fox News Channel
- Stephen Colletti (born 1986), reality TV star
- Erin Coscarelli (born 1984), anchor, who works for NFL Network
- Deena Cortese (born 1987), reality TV star, known for Jersey Shore
- Chris Cuomo (born 1970), journalist is the presenter of Cuomo Prime Time, a weeknight news analysis show on CNN
- Tony Danza (born 1951), actor and talk show host
- Giada De Laurentiis (born 1970), chef, writer, TV personality, host of the Food Network programs Everyday Italian, Behind the Bash, Giada's Weekend Getaways and Giada in Paradise
- Robert De Laurentiis, television director
- Pauly DelVecchio (born 1980), reality TV star, known for Jersey Shore
- Gary Dell'Abate (born 1961), producer of The Howard Stern Show and co-host of The Wrap-Up Show
- Giuliana DePandi (born 1975), host of E! News
- Perla Farías Lombardini (born 1962), Venezuelan born Italian American screenwriter, television director, producer, and an executive at Telemundo
- Jennifer "JWoww" Farley (born 1986), reality TV star, known for Jersey Shore
- Guy Fieri (born 1968), restaurateur, author and television personality
- Annette Funicello (1942–2013), singer and actress, Walt Disney's most popular Mouseketeer
- Sammi "Sweetheart" Giancola (born 1987), reality TV star, known for Jersey Shore
- Vinny Guadagnino (born 1987), reality TV star, known for Jersey Shore
- Victoria Gotti (born 1962), star of Growing Up Gotti on the A&E Network
- Jimmy Kimmel (born 1967), television comedy talk-show host and producer
- Jay Leno (born 1950), comedian, known as host of The Tonight Show and the Jay Leno Show
- Ronnie Ortiz-Magro (born 1985), reality TV star, known for Jersey Shore
- Anthony Melchiorri (born 1966), reality TV star
- Alyssa Milano (born 1972), actress, producer and former singer. Star of Who's the Boss?
- Kelly Monaco (born 1976), model, actress, and reality television contestant
- Danny Pintauro (born 1976), actor best known for his role as Jonathan Bower on the popular American sitcom Who's the Boss?
- Angelina Pivarnick (born 1986): reality TV star, known for Jersey Shore
- Rachael Ray (born 1968), Emmy-winning television personality and author
- Gina Carano (born 1982), model, former MMA fighter and actress
- Leah Remini (born 1970), actress
- Kelly Ripa (born 1970), actress and talk show host
- Jai Rodriguez (born 1979), actor and culture guide on Queer Eye for the Straight Guy
- Andy Samberg (born 1978), actor, comedian, writer, producer and musician
- Dave Filoni (born 1974), director, producer, writer and voice actor
- Maria Sansone (born 1981), host of "The 9" on Yahoo! and special events for TV Guide Network
- Mike "The Situation" Sorrentino (born 1982), reality TV star, known for Jersey Shore
- Will Sasso (born 1975), actor, podcaster; American citizen of Canadian birth
- Kim Zolciak (born 1978), reality TV star

== Musicians ==
See also List of Sicilian-American jazz musicians.

- Buffy Sainte-Marie, born Beverly Jean Santamaria, a singer-songwriter, musician, and social activist
- Sal Abruscato, hard rock/heavy metal drummer, known for his work with early Type O Negative and Life of Agony
- Roberto Alagna, operatic tenor
- Steve Albini (1962–2024), indie rock musician, producer
- Trey Anastasio, leader of jam band Phish
- Phil Anselmo, heavy metal singer, a leading member of Pantera.
- Vinny Appice, heavy metal drummer
- Frankie Avalon, (born 1940) trumpet, singer, and actor
- Veronica Ballestrini, singer-songwriter
- Frankie Banali, drummer, Quiet Riot
- Joey Belladonna, heavy metal singer
- Remo Belli (1927–2016), jazz drummer
- Frank Bello, heavy metal bass player for Anthrax
- Louie Bellson, born Luigi Ballassoni, big band drummer
- Charlie Benante, heavy metal drummer for Anthrax
- Tony Bennett, American jazz and traditional pop singer
- Dean Benedetti, jazz saxophonist
- Bia, rapper
- Corbin Bleu, singer and actor in High School Musical; Italian mother
- Joe Bonamassa, blues rock musician, singer, and songwriter.
- Anthony Bongiovi, record producer
- Jon Bon Jovi (born 1962), born John Francis Bongiovi, rock star, actor
- Bizzy Bone, born Bryon McCane, a rapper from the group Bone Thugs N Harmony, part Italian on mother's side
- Mike Bordin, rock drummer from band Faith No More
- Chris Botti, jazz trumpeter; Italian on father's side
- Terry Bozzio (born 1950), drummer best known for his stint with Frank Zappa
- Vito Bratta, glam metal guitarist and songwriter, former member of glam metal band White Lion
- Jeff Buckley (1966–1997), rock musician with distinctive vocal and compositional abilities; grandmother of Italian descent
- Tim Buckley (1947–1975), folk, jazz, and rock artist; father of the musician Jeff Buckley; mother of Italian descent
- Sam Butera, jazz saxophonist
- Conte Candoli, jazz trumpeter
- Pete Candoli, jazz trumpeter
- Freddy Cannon (born 1940), born Frederick Anthony Picariello, rock and roll singer, had three top ten hits
- Chris Carrabba, lead singer of Dashboard Confessional and former lead singer of Further Seems Forever
- Carmen Cavallaro (1913–1989), pianist called the Poet of the Piano
- Harry Wayne Casey, leader of K.C. & the Sunshine Band; credited for inventing the boogie disco band sound; Italian on his mother's side
- Suzette Charles, singer, entertainer, former Miss America
- Anthony Checchia (1930– 2024), basson player, co-founded the Philadelphia Chamber Music Society
- Gary Cherone, former lead singer of Extreme and Van Halen
- Lou Christie (born 1943), born Lugee Alfredo Giovanni Sacco on February, singer-songwriter
- Dr. Chud, born David Calabrese, former drummer for the Misfits
- John Cocuzzi, jazz musician
- Vinnie Colaiuta, drummer famous in jazz circles for his virtuosity and his stint with Frank Zappa
- Ry Cooder, guitarist
- Louie Clemente, born Luciano Angelo Di Clemente in Lioni, Italy, original drummer of thrash metal band Testament
- Jerry Colonna (1904–1986) actor, entertainer, singer, trombonist
- Russ Columbo (1908–1934), composer, singer, violinist and actor
- Perry Como, American singer, actor, and television personality
- Chick Corea, jazz pianist virtuoso, played with Miles Davis
- John Corigliano Sr., violinist concertmaster of New York Philharmonic Orchestra
- Alessandro Cortini, rock star, keyboardist for Nine Inch Nails
- Don Costa, pianist, pop music arranger
- Jack Costanzo, percussionist, The King of Bongo
- Ashley Costello, singer, New Years Day
- Ward Costello (1919–2009), actor/composer/lyricist
- Peter Criss, born George Peter John Criscuola, drummer, formerly of KISS
- Jim Croce, folk and rock singer-songwriter
- Warren Cuccurullo, guitarist for Frank Zappa, Missing Persons and Duran Duran
- Rivers Cuomo (born 1970), member of Weezer
- Alan Dale (1926–2002), born Aldo Sigismondi, singer of traditional popular and rock'n'roll music
- Vic Damone, American traditional pop and big band singer and actor.
- Glenn Danzig, born Glenn Anzalone, former lead singer and one of the founders of Misfits
- Bobby Darin (1936–1973), born Walden Robert Cassotto, one of the most popular rock and roll teen idols of the late 1950s
- Decoy, born Nicholas Edward Galluzzo, also known as Nicholas Edward Case; Italian-French mother and Italian father; rapper and singer
- Pietro Deiro, accordionist
- Buddy DeFranco, jazz musician
- Tony DeFranco, lead singer and guitarist of The DeFranco Family
- Chris DeGarmo, ex-guitarist of 1980s rock band Queensrÿche
- Joey DeMaio, bassist, main songwriter and one of the founding members of the heavy metal band Manowar
- Warren DeMartini, former guitarist of Ratt, born to an Italian-American family.
- Liberty DeVitto, rock drummer for Billy Joel
- Tommy DeVito (musician)
- Al Di Meola, jazz fusion guitarist
- Vince DiFiore, trumpeter and keyboardist
- Ani DiFranco, singer-songwriter
- Orlando DiGirolamo, jazz musician
- Mike DiMeo, former singer of Riot and Masterplan
- Dion DiMucci, leading doo wop, rock and roll, and blues artist of the 1950s and 60s
- Ronnie James Dio (1942–2010), heavy metal singer
- Joe Dolce, Australian born singer-songwriter, poet and essayist
- Micky Dolenz, singer and drummer for The Monkees
- Charlie Dominici, ex-Dream Theater vocalist, founding member of Dominici
- Sully Erna, born Salvatore Erna, lead singer of the band Godsmack, of full Italian descent
- Faith Evans, singer
- Queen Naija, singer, (African American and Italian mother)
- Nick Falcon, psychobilly guitarist, founding member of The Young Werewolves
- Santo Farina, one half of the guitar duo Santo and Johnny, who had a huge instrumental hit with "Sleepwalk" in 1959.
- Joe Farrell, born Joseph Firrantello, jazz saxophonist
- Josh Farro, lead guitarist for Paramore
- Zac Farro, drummer for Paramore
- Ted Fio Rito, composer, orchestra leader, and keyboardist
- Sam Fogarino, drummer for Interpol
- Lita Ford, singer and guitarist, formerly of The Runaways
- Johnny Frigo, jazz violinist and bassist
- John Frusciante, guitarist for the Red Hot Chili Peppers
- Steve Gadd, world-famous jazz and session drummer
- Theodore L. Gargiulo (1915–2006), conductor, composer, and musicologist.
- Bob Gaudio, singer, keyboardist and composer
- Lady Gaga, singer, actress, songwriter. Mother and Father of Italian descent
- Selena Gomez, singer, actress, songwriter. Mother of Italian descent.
- Ariana Grande, singer, actress of Italian descent.
- Stéphane Grappelli, jazz violinist
- George Greeley, pianist, film and television composer, conductor, recording artist
- DJ Green Lantern, born James D'Agostini, hip-hop DJ; father is Puerto Rican and mother is Italian
- Carla Harvey (born 1976), singer for the Butcher Babies
- Davey Havok (born 1975), born David Paden Passaro, later changed to David Paden Marchand, vocalist for AFI
- Frank Iero, rhythm guitarist for the band My Chemical Romance
- Chris Impellitteri, guitarist
- Chris Isaak, songwriter, singer and actor; mother is Italian-American
- Alicia Keys, pianist; mother is Italian (Augello)
- Morgana King, jazz singer
- Scott LaFaro, jazz musician
- Danny Lamagna, drummer of Agnostic Front
- John LaPorta, jazz clarinetist
- Eddie Lang, guitarist
- Mario Lanza, tenor, actor and Hollywood film star
- Nick LaRocca, jazz musician
- Nicholas Laucella (1882-1952), composer and the principal flautist at the New York Philharmonic and the Metropolitan Opera
- Adam Lazzara, lead singer of Taking Back Sunday
- Kenny Loggins, singer-songwriter and guitarist
- Carmen Lombardo, vocalist and composer
- Dave Lombardo, drummer of Testament and Misfits
- Guy Lombardo, born Gaetano Alberto "Guy" Lombardo, bandleader and violinist
- Lebert Lombardo, named by Louis Armstrong as one of his favorite trumpeters
- Victor Lombardo, saxophonist
- James LoMenzo, bassist, formerly of White Lion and currently of Megadeth
- Joe Long, born Joseph LaBracio, bassist and vocal arranger for The Four Seasons
- Joe Lovano, jazz saxophonist
- Lydia Lunch, musician, poet, actress, spoken word
- Joe Lynn Turner, former vocalist of Deep Purple and Rainbow, born Joseph Arthur Mark Linquito
- Madonna, pop singer, known as the Queen of Pop since the 1980s
- Mike Mangini, drummer of Dream Theater
- Dodo Marmarosa, jazz pianist
- Dean Martin (1917–1995), singer and film actor, one of the most famous artists and TV personality of the 20th century period
- Al Martino, American traditional pop and jazz singer
- Pat Martino, jazz guitarist
- Fred Mascherino, guitarist and backing vocalist of Taking Back Sunday
- Nick Massi (1927–2000), bassist and singer of The Four Seasons
- Pat Mastelotto, drummer for Mr. Mister and King Crimson
- Nick Menza (1964–2016), former drummer of Megadeth
- Natalie Merchant, singer and songwriter, father is of Italian descent
- Jo Dee Messina, country music artist
- Joe Messina, guitarist
- Lucia Micarelli, violinist
- Bobby Militello, saxophonist for Dave Brubeck Quartet
- Chieli Minucci, smooth jazz guitarist
- Tom Morello, guitarist for Rage Against the Machine
- Joe Morello, jazz drummer
- Sal Mosca, jazz pianist
- Tony Mottola, guitarist
- DJ Muggs, DJ, audio engineer and record producer
- Mitchel Musso, musician, actor, star of Disney's Hannah Montana; part Italian on father's side
- Vido Musso, jazz clarinetist, saxophonist and bandleader
- Ken Navarro, contemporary jazz guitarist
- Jerry Only, born Gerald Caiafa, bassist for the Misfits
- Frankie Palmeri, Emmure singer
- Daryl Palumbo, singer, frontman for bands Glassjaw, Head Automatica, and Color Film
- Felix Pappalardi, rock and roll bassist and producer
- Gretchen Parlato, Jazz singer
- Joe Pass (1929–1994), born Joseph Anthony Jacobi Passalaqua, jazz guitarist
- John Patitucci, electric and acoustic bass virtuoso; played with Chick Corea and Wayne Shorter
- Art Pepper, jazz musician
- Joe Perry born Joseph Anthony Pereira, lead guitarist and contributing songwriter for the rock band Aerosmith
- Vincent Persichetti, composer
- John Petrucci, heavy metal guitarist, founding member of Dream Theater
- Roxy Petrucci, drummer for Madam X and Vixen
- Flip Phillips, jazz saxophonist
- Guy Picciotto, early Emo personality, noted for Rites of Spring and Fugazi
- Bucky Pizzarelli, classical jazz guitarist
- John Pizzarelli, jazz guitarist
- Martin Pizzarelli, jazz double-bassist
- Jeff Porcaro, rock drummer from band Toto
- Joe Porcaro, jazz drummer, dad of three Porcaro's brothers members of the rock band Toto
- Mike Porcaro, rock bassist from band Toto
- Steve Porcaro, keyboardist, songwriter, singer, and film composer from band Toto
- Mike Portnoy, drummer, founding member of Dream Theater
- Teddy Powell, born Teodoro Paolella, jazz guitarist, composer and big band leader
- Louis Prima (1910–1978), Italian-American jazz musician, singer, and actor
- Suzi Quatro, born Susan Kay Quattrocchi, rock star, bassist singer-songwriter
- Moxie Raia, born Laura Raia, singer-songwriter
- Twiggy Ramirez, born Jeordie Osbourne White, rock star, ex-bassist for Marilyn Manson
- Ruggiero Ricci (1918–2012), violin virtuoso
- Johnny Rivers, born John Ramistella, early rock'n roll singer with many hit records
- Adrian Rollini, jazz saxophonist and vibraphonist
- Tony Romano, jazz guitarist and singer
- Leon Roppolo (1902–1943), prominent early jazz clarinetist and composer
- Frank Rosolino, jazz trombonist
- Matt Rubano, bassist of Taking Back Sunday
- Pete Rugolo, jazz composer, arranger and record producer
- Russ – Hip hop rapper of Italian descent
- William Russo, jazz musician
- Bobby Rydell (born 1942), born Robert Louis Ridarelli in Philadelphia, Pennsylvania, "teen idol" in the early days of rock and roll
- Melanie Safka, mother is of Italian descent
- Buffy Sainte-Marie, singer-songwriter
- Sal Salvador (1925–1999), whose name was originally Silvio Smiraglia, was an bebop jazz guitarist
- Ralph Santolla, metal guitarist; has a custom Jackson guitar with the Italian flag painted on it
- Joe Satriani, guitar virtuoso
- Haley Scarnato, American Idol season 6 contestant
- Jack Scott (1936–2019), born Giovanni Dominico Scafone Jr. in Ontario, Canada, Canadian/American singer and songwriter
- Anthony Sepe, former Memphis May Fire rhythm guitarist
- John Serry, Sr. (1915–2003), born Giovanni Serrapica, concert accordionist, composer, arranger, educator; father of John Serry, Jr.
- Frank Sinatra, arguably the most famous personality in American history
- Ramón Stagnaro, Peruvian American guitarist of Italian father
- Nikki Sixx, born Frank Carlton Serafino Feranna Jr., songwriter and bassist of Mötley Crüe and Sixx:A.M.
- DJ Skribble, DJ and producer
- Jamie Spaniolo, rapper
- Robert Spano, conductor and pianist
- Bruce Springsteen, songwriter, guitarist, rock star; mother is of Italian descent
- Gwen Stefani, singer, frontwoman for the rock band No Doubt
- Vinnie Stigma, lead guitarist of Agnostic Front
- Taylor Swift, singer-songwriter; father is part Italian
- Joseph Tarsia, recording engineer
- Susan Tedeschi, blues rock singer and guitarist
- Johnny Thunders, born John A. Genzale, rock musician
- Mark Tremonti, lead guitarist of Tremonti
- Lennie Tristano, jazz pianist and composer
- Steven Tyler, born Steven Victor Tallarico, rock star, songwriter; Italian on his father's side
- Steve Vai, guitar virtuoso
- Wolfgang Van Halen, member of rock group Van Halen, mother Valerie Bertinelli is of part Italian descent
- Giada Valenti, singer
- Francis Valentino, drummer
- Steven Van Zandt (born 1950), musician, songwriter, arranger, record producer, actor (The Sopranos), and radio disc jockey
- Ronnie Vannucci, drummer for The Killers
- Zacky Vengeance, rhythm guitarist for the band Avenged Sevenfold
- Joe Venuti, jazz violinist
- Holly Beth Vincent, leader of punk - pop band Holly and the Italians
- Tony Visconti, rock music producer (based in Britain)
- Doyle Wolfgang Von Frankenstein, born Paul Caiafa, former guitarist for the Misfits
- Chris Vrenna (born 1967), producer and drummer
- George Wallington, jazz pianist
- Gerard Way, lead singer for the band My Chemical Romance
- Mikey Way, bass guitarist for the band My Chemical Romance
- Dean Ween, born Michael Melchiondo, Ween guitarist
- XXXTentacion, rapper
- "Weird Al" Yankovic (born 1959), parodist and comedy musician; mother's side is Italian
- Timi Yuro, soul and R&B singer
- Z-Trip, born Zach Sciacca, DJ and producer
- Dweezil Zappa, rock guitarist
- Frank Zappa (1940–1993), composer, guitarist, singer and satirist; Sicilian father and 3/4 Italian mother
- Neil Zaza, neo-classical melodic guitarist

== Songwriters ==
- Francesca Battistelli (born 1985), gospel music songwriter and performer
- Bhad Bhabie, rapper and social media personality
- Michael Bradley, songwriter, singer, artist; 3/4 Italian
- Peter Cincotti (born 1983), singer-pianists and songwriter
- Rivers Cuomo (born 1970), member of Weezer
- Bob DiPiero, songwriter, Nashville Songwriter Hall of Fame
- Waka Flocka Flame, rapper
- Bob Gaudio, songwriter, member of The Four Seasons
- Christina Grimmie, singer and songwriter
- James V. Monaco, early American songwriter "You Made Me Love You"
- Laura Nyro, songwriter, Italian father, Russian Jewish and Polish Jewish mother
- Tony Romeo, songwriter, known for work on The Partridge Family
- Patti Scialfa, father of Sicilian ancestry
- Holly Beth Vincent, songwriter, Italian father
- Harry Warren (1893–1981), born Salvatore Guaragna, wrote more hit songs than anyone else in early 20th-century America

== Singers ==
- Al Alberts, born Al Albertini, singer and musician known for work with The Four Aces
- Trey Anastasio, singer, guitarist, songwriter
- Romina Arena, pop classical crossover singer
- Billie Joe Armstrong (born 1972), singer, songwriter, musician, actor and record producer (great-grandparent)
- Frankie Avalon (born 1940), born Francis Avallone, singer, actor
- Daniela Avanzini Llorente (born 2004), Venezuelan American singer and dancer
- Kelsea Ballerini (born 1993), country music singer
- Sara Bareilles (born 1979), singer and songwriter
- Kaci Battaglia, singer
- Tony Bennett (1926–2023), born Anthony Dominick Benedetto, singer
- Lory Bianco (born 1963), singer and actress
- Sonny Bono (1935–1998), born Salvatore Phillip Bono, producer, actor, and politician
- Eddie Brigati (born 1945), singer, composer for the 60s rock band The Young Rascals
- Gioia Bruno, born Carmen Gioia Bruno, singer
- Freddy Cannon (born 1940), born Frederick Anthony Picariello Jr., rock and roll singer
- Mina Caputo, singer, member of Life of Agony
- Harry Wayne Casey (born 1940), leader of K.C. and the Sunshine Band; Italian grandmother
- Felix Cavaliere (born 1942), singer-songwriter for 60s rock band The Young Rascals
- Michael Cerveris (born 1960), actor, singer, and guitarist
- Lou Christie (born 1943), born Luigi Alfredo Giovanni Sacco
- Perry Como (1912–2001), born Pierino Ronald Como
- Jill Corey (1935–2021), born Norma Jean Speranza
- Don Cornell (1919–2004), born Luigi Francesco Varlaro, a popular singer
- Chrissy Costanza (born 1995), singer-songwriter for Against The Current
- Jim Croce (1943–1973), singer
- Rivers Cuomo (born 1970), member of Weezer; father
- Victor Damiani
- Vic Damone (1928–2018), born Vito Rocco Farinola, singer
- Vic Dana, singer
- Bobby Darin (1936–1973), born Walden Robert Cassotto, singer
- James Darren (born 1936), born James Ercolani, actor, singer, teen idol
- Jimmy Durante (1893–1980), singer, pianist, comedian, and actor
- Johnny Desmond (1920–1985), born Giovanni Alfredo De Simone, popular singer
- Tommy DeVito (1928–2020), musician and singer, member of The Four Seasons
- Ani DiFranco (born 1970), Grammy Award-winning singer, guitarist, songwriter, Italian American on father's side
- Dion DiMucci (born 1939), better known as Dion
- Kara Dioguardi, singer of Italian and Albanian heritage
- Eamon, Italian mother (née Zizzo), Irish father
- Pasquale Esposito, Italian born tenor
- Lita Ford, also guitarist, born in England; Italian mother
- Fabian Forte (born 1942), singer, teen idol, actor
- Sergio Franchi (1926–1990), born Sergio Franci Galli, singer, Broadway and television actor
- Connie Francis (born 1936), born Concetta Rosa Maria Franconero, singer
- Frankee, born Nicole Francine Aiello, singer
- Farrah Franklin, singer-songwriter, actress, also African-American
- Annette Funicello (1942–2013), singer, actress, Mickey Mouse Club and beach party movies in the 60s
- Frank Gari (born 1942), late 1950s singer; founder of Gari Communications
- Bob Gaudio (born 1942), singer, songwriter, and record producer, member of The Four Seasons
- Sonny Geraci (1946–2017), singer
- Selena Gomez, Italian on mother's side
- Mikalah Gordon (born 1988), singer
- Eydie Gorme (1928–2013), father was from Sicily
- Lou Gramm (born 1950), born Louis Andrew Grammatico, rock vocalist for Foreigner
- Ariana Grande (born 1993), born Ariana Grande-Butera, singer, songwriter and actress
- Mitch Grassi, member of Grammy Award-winning a cappella group Pentatonix
- Buddy Greco (1926–2017), born Armando Greco, singer
- Francesca Gregorini (born 1968), singer and songwriter; daughter of Jewish/Irish American model Barbara Bach and Italian businessman Augusto Gregorini
- Frank Guarrera (1923–2007), opera baritone
- Halsey (born 1994), born Ashley Nicolette Frangipane, singer-songwriter
- Jessicka, born Jessica Fodera in Brooklyn
- Alicia Keys (born 1981), born Alicia Augello Cook, R&B singer, Italian mother
- Morgana King (1930–2018), born Maria Grazia Morgana Messina, jazz singer
- Julius La Rosa (1930–2016), singer popular in the 1950s
- Rudy La Scala (born 1954) – singer and composer
- Lady Gaga (born 1986), born Stefani Joanne Angelina Germanotta, singer and songwriter
- Frankie Laine (1913–2007), born Frank Paul LoVecchio, one of the most successful singers in history
- Mario Lanza (1921–1959), born Alfred Arnold Cocozza, recording star, operatic tenor, film actor
- Cyndi Lauper, part Italian
- Lil Skies, rapper, Italian mother.
- Demi Lovato, singer, also has Mexican ancestry
- Madonna, born Madonna Louise Ciccone in Michigan, singer, songwriter, record producer and film director, daughter of Italian father and French-Canadian mother
- Sanjaya Malakar, American Idol season six finalist; half-Italian through his mother
- Pablo Manavello – Italian-born Venezuelan composer, guitarist, singer and songwriter
- Al Martino, singer
- Guy Marks (1923–1987) (Mario Scarpa) actor, comedian, singer and impressionist
- Dean Martin (1917–1995), born Dino Crocetti, singer and film actor
- Deana Martin, singer, actress, and author; daughter of Dean Martin
- Al Martino (1927–2009), born Alfred Cini in Philadelphia, Pennsylvania
- Nick Massi (1935–2000), born Nicholas Macioci, bass singer for the Four Seasons
- Jo Dee Messina (born 1970), country music singer
- Don Mclean (born 1945), singer-songwriter; Italian mother
- Tim McGraw (born 1967), country music singer and actor, mother is of Italian descent
- Liza Minnelli (born 1946), singer, actress; Italian father
- Anna Moffo (1932–2006), lyric-coloratura soprano
- Lou Monte (1917–1989)
- Mya (born 1979)
- Stacie Orrico (born 1986), contemporary Christian music/pop singer
- Nicola Paone (1915–2003), singer-songwriter
- Gretchen Parlato (born 1976), jazz singer
- Christina Perri (born 1986), singer and songwriter
- Rosa Ponselle born Rosa Ponzillo, (1897–1981), operatic dramatic soprano
- Charlie Puth (born 1991), singer and songwriter, brother of Stephen Puth, father is German and Hungarian
- Johnny Rivers (born 1942), born John Ramistella, popular rock singer, songwriter and guitarist
- Beri Rosse (1917–2003), singer leader of The Fontane Sisters
- Jimmy Roselli (1925–2011), singer
- Bobby Rydell (born 1942), born Robert Ridarelli, singer
- Buffy Sainte-Marie singer-songwriter, musician, and social activist, father of Italian ancestry
- Haley Scarnato
- Frank Sinatra (1915–1998)
- Frank Sinatra, Jr. (1944–2016)
- Nancy Sinatra
- Bruce Springsteen, (born 1949), mother of Italian ancestry
- Gwen Stefani, singer and musician, Italian father
- Connie Stevens (born 1938), born Concetta Rosalie Ann Ingoglia, singer and actress
- Susan Tedeschi (born 1970), blues and soul singer and songwriter
- John Tartaglia (born 1978), singer, actor, dancer and puppeteer
- Marc Terenzi (born 1978), pop star, songwriter
- Salli Terri (1922–1996), singer, arranger, recording artist, and composer.
- Pia Toscano (born 1988), contestant on the tenth season of American Idol
- Steven Tyler (born 1948), born Steven Tallarico – Italian Grandfather – Rock Vocalist for Aerosmith
- Jerry Vale (1930–2014), born Genaro Louis Vitaliano, singer
- Benita Valente (1934-2025), soprano in opera, lieder, chamber music and oratorio
- Frankie Valli (born 1934), born Francis Stephen Castelluccio, member of The Four Seasons
- Holly Beth Vincent, singer and songwriter Holly and the Italians father Italian
- Franco Ventriglia (1922–2012), born Francesco Ventriglia, opera singer
- Zhavia Ward (born 2001)
- Timi Yuro (1940–2004), born Rosemarie Timotea Aurro
- Frank Zappa (1940–1993), rock singer, guitarist

== Stand-up comedians ==
- Dan Licata
- Chris Distefano
- Bryan Callen
- Mario Cantone (born 1959), comedian, writer, actor
- Pat Cooper, born Pasquale Caputo
- Chris D'Elia
- Nick DiPaolo
- Adam Ferrara
- Janeane Garofalo, comedian, actor, liberal political activist and writer, half Italian
- Chris Hardwick, comedian, TV host, and musician, half Italian
- Pat Henry, comedian, born Patrick Henry Scarnato, long-time opening act for Frank Sinatra
- Dom Irrera
- Richard Jeni, born Richard John Colangelo
- Lisa Lampanelli, three-quarters Italian
- Matteo Lane (born 1982), comedian, part Italian
- Artie Lange, comedian, actor, radio personality, and author best known for The Howard Stern Show and the comedy sketch series MADtv, half Italian
- Jay Leno (born 1950), comedian, former host of The Tonight Show and host of The Jay Leno Show, half Italian
- Sebastian Maniscalco
- Guy Marks (1923–1987) (Mario Scarpa) actor, comedian, singer and impressionist
- Tammy Pescatelli
- Joe Rogan, comedian, former host of Fear Factor, three-quarters Italian
- Ray Romano, actor, stand-up comedian, screenwriter and voice actor, best known for his role on the sitcom Everybody Loves Raymond
- Chris Rush
- Judy Tenuta, entertainer, actress, comedian, author, producer, and accordionist; half Italian
- Jackie Vernon (1924–1987), born Ralph Verrone, stand-up comic and the cartoon voice of Frosty the Snowman
- Brittany Furlan (born 1986), comedian and internet personality
- Lou Costello
- Vic DiBitetto, comedian and internet personality

== Adult movie stars ==
- Farrah Abraham, of Italian and Syrian descent from her father's side, Sicilian and Danish descent from her mother's side
- Lizzy Borden, born Janet Romano-Zicari
- Jewel De'Nyle, half Italian, part English, part Spanish, part Native American (Blackfoot)
- Tommy Gunn
- Ariana Jollee, half Russian Jewish, half Italian
- Leena La Bianca
- Shy Love, half Italian, half Puerto Rican
- Gina Lynn, born Tanya Mercado, half Italian, part Puerto Rican, part Dutch
- Lisa Ann, of Italian descent
- Nica Noelle, of Italian and Danish descent on her father's side, Irish and Welsh descent on her mother's side
- Kirsten Price, born Katherine L'Heureux, mother of Italian descent and father of French descent
- Raylene, born Stacey Bernstein, of Italian and Mexican descent on her mother's side, her father is Jewish of Polish and Austrian descent
- Amber Rayne (1984–2016), born Meghan Wren, was of mixed Italian, Scottish, Irish and Native American descent
- Raven Riley, half Italian, half Cherokee
- Bonnie Rotten, of Italian, German, Polish and Jewish descent
- Dylan Ryder, half Italian, half German
- Joey Stefano (1968–1994)
- Michael Stefano
- Taryn Thomas, of full Italian descent (Sicilian and Neapolitan)

== Adult models ==
- Aria Giovanni, born Cindy Renee Preto, adult model with Penthouse, Hustler, and Club magazines

== Professional wrestlers ==
- Trent Acid (1980–2010), born Michael Verdi
- Lou Albano (1933–2009)
- Mike Awesome (1965–2007), born Michael Lee Alfonso, former ECW and WCW wrestler; mother of Italian descent
- The Bella Twins, former professional WWE wrestlers, half Italian, mother of Italian descent
- Carmella, born Leah Van Dale, best known for her time in WWE, daughter of Paul Van Dale
- Primo Carnera (1906–1967)
- Kacy Catanzaro
- Catrina, born Karlee Leilani Perez, best known for her time in WWE under the ring name Maxine, of Spanish, Cuban, Italian, Hawaiian and Chinese ancestry
- Rhyno, born Terrance Guido Gerin, WWE wrestler; Italian immigrant grandparents
- John Cena, half Italian, father of Italian descent
- Antonio Cesaro, born Claudio Castagnoli
- Rico Chiapparelli
- Tommaso Ciampa
- Mark Copani, wrestler best known for his Muhammad Hassan character in WWE; half Italian, half Arab
- Bo Dallas, born Taylor Rotunda
- Sonya Deville, born Daria Rae Berenato
- Ilio DiPaolo
- Tommy Dreamer, born Thomas James Laughlin
- Bubba Ray Dudley, born Mark LoMonaco
- Elias, born Jeffrey Daniel Sciullo
- Johnny Gargano
- Joy Giovanni, briefly worked for WWE on SmackDown! in 2005, winning female Rookie of the Year
- Big Sal E. Graziano, former ECW wrestler
- Horace Hogan, born Michael Allan Bollea, nephew of Hulk Hogan
- Hulk Hogan, born Terry Eugene Bollea; Italian on father's side
- Hook, born Tyler Senerchia
- April Hunter
- Cora Jade, born Brianna Coda
- Low Ki, born Brandon Silvestry, best known for his time in WWE as Kaval, of Italian and Puerto Rican descent
- Karrion Kross, born Kevin Robert Kesar, of Costa Rican, Puerto Rican, Italian, Greek, Scandinavian, Croatian, British, and Irish descent
- Steve Lombardi
- Joey Marella (1963–1994), born Joseph Anthony Marella, professional wrestling referee; son of legendary wrestler Gorilla Monsoon
- Eva Marie, half Italian, Italian on father's side
- Ashley Massaro (1979–2019), former WWE wrestler
- Gorilla Monsoon (1937–1999), born Robert James Marella
- Lenny Montana (1926–1992), former professional wrestler known as "The Zebra Kid" and "Chief Chewacki" in the 1960s
- Lisa Moretti (born 1961), born Lisa Mary Moretti, best known by her stage name Ivory, professional wrestler
- Liv Morgan, born Gionna Jene Daddio, of Italian descent, majority of her ancestry linked to Salerno
- Nunzio, born James Maritato, professional wrestler
- Nic Nemeth, born Nicholas Nemeth
- Ryan Nemeth, brother to Nic Nemeth, claimed partial Italian ancestry
- Chuck Palumbo, born Charles Ronald Palumbo, professional wrestler
- Angelo Poffo
- Lanny Poffo, known as "Leaping Lanny" or "The Genius"; son of Angelo Poffo; brother to Randy Savage
- Val Puccio
- Tony Parisi, born Antonio Pugliese
- Deonna Purrazzo
- Roman Reigns, born Leati Joseph Anoa'i, Samoan father and Italian mother
- Paul Roma
- Romeo Roselli
- Mandy Rose, born Amanda Rose Saccomanno, professional wrestler
- Mike Rotunda, known as "Irwin R. Schyster", wrestled with the WWF from 1991 to 2004
- Tino Sabbatelli
- Bruno Sammartino (1935–2018), born Bruno Leopoldo Francesco Sammartino, former professional wrestler
- "Macho Man" Randy Savage (1952–2011), born Randall Mario Poffo; son of Angelo Poffo; brother of Lanny Poffo
- Tazz, born Peter Senerchia, former professional wrestler and currently wrestling commentator
- Velvet Sky, born Jamie Lynn Szantyr, of Polish and Italian descent
- Bray Wyatt (1987–2023), born Windham Lawrence Rotunda (father of Italian descent), third generation professional wrestler, son of Mike Rotunda, grandson of Blackjack Mulligan, brother of Bo Dallas
- Vince Russo, Creative writer, and booker at WCW
- A.J. Befumo, (born 1976)

== Others ==
- Toni Basil (born 1943), born Antonia Christina Basilotta, dancer, actress, singer
- Andrew "A.J." Befumo Jr. (born 1976), social media personality
- Eric Befumo (born 2013), social media personality
- James Berardinelli, film critic
- Judy Canova (1913–1983), born Juliette Canova, comedian, actress, singer, and radio personality
- Joe Cino (1931–1967), theater director and café owner credited with launching off-off-Broadway
- Danny Daniels, dancer
- Joe Dallesandro (born 1948), underground film star and model made famous by Andy Warhol and Paul Morrissey
- Sofie Dossi (born 2001), YouTuber, contortionist, aerialist, dancer and internet personality.
- Giancarlo Esposito (born 1958), actor and director
- Fabian (born 1943), born in Philadelphia, Pennsylvania; teen idol of the late 1950s and early 1960s; rose to national prominence after performing several times on American Bandstand; born Fabiano Anthony Forte, he adopted the stage name Fabian Forte but has always been known by his first name only
- Eugene Louis Faccuito, dancer and choreographer
- Angelo Faticoni, contortionist
- Rosina Ferrara (1861–1934), model to 19th-century American and British painters, muse of American expatriate artist John Singer Sargent
- Peter Gennaro, choreographer
- Phillip James DeFranco (born 1985), born Philip James Franchini Jr., YouTube personality
- Christian Joseph (born 2016), social media personality
- Keemstar (born 1982), born Daniel M. Keem, YouTuber, podcaster, and streamer
- Frank Lentini (1889–1966), born Francesco A. Lentini, born in Siracusa, Sicily; born with three longer legs, two sets of genitals and one rudimentary foot on his third leg; his primary legs also grew into different lengths; at age nine, he moved to the United States and entered the sideshow business
- Tom and Ray Magliozzi conductors of radio show Car Talk
- Mario Nugara, Ballet dancer, choreographer, educator
- Anthony Pusateri, choreographer
- Anthony Fantano, YouTube Personality and Music Journalist
- Shane Salerno (born 1972), screenwriter, producer, and director
- Hank Sanicola (1914–1974), American music manager, publisher, businessman, and pianist
