= Gargiulo =

Gargiulo (Italian: [ɡarˈdʒuːlo], Neapolitan: [ɡarˈdʒuːlə]) is a surname from Southern Italy, primarily Naples, but also common in North and South America, especially the United States and Argentina. A small number of Gargiulo's change the spelling to Corjulo when they immigrated to the U.S.

== Origin and derivation ==
Though very common there, it is not specific to Naples: it is the 11th most common surname in the region of Campania, which was 9.5% of the population of Italy in 1980, and Naples made up at that time only roughly 23% of the population of Campania. The surname was extremely common in both Naples and the Sorrentine area quite early, and is well documented in church records in the end of the 16th century. In Sorrento alone there was an estimated minimum Gargiulo population of 500 at any one time in the 17th century based on a 2008 study of at least 600 Gargiulo church records from 8 area churches. For such a large Gargiulo community to have existed in the Sorrentine area in the 17th century, it is estimated that the surname must already have been in common usage there in the 16th century before the commencement of church records ca. 1580, and probably also as early as the 15th century. The same could almost certainly also be documented for the same period for Naples and the surrounding area.

Sometimes said to be derived from a diminutive of gargia, Sicilian for "jaw", "mandible" or Calabrian for "open mouth", presumably applied as a nickname. However, there is no known source for this pure speculation: the exact origin of the surname and when it first came into common usage is not presently known, and it is perhaps derived from Gargiu or from the common Roman family name Gargilius (as many surnames in Campania are derived from Roman ones). The best known Roman of this name today was Quintus Gargilius Martialis, a soldier, Roman official, and writer on medical subjects, though not a physician; a lot is known about him because of the admiration for his medical writings in the Middle Ages.

It is unusual that so many in the Sorentine surroundings (and Naples) were already using the Gargiulo surname in 1600, since ordinary people in other parts of Europe had not yet started using surnames at this early time. However, Romans commonly did use 2 names, and even 3, which could help explain the early use of 2 and 3 names in southern Italy. However, so far no connection between Gargiulo and Gargilius has been documented.

== Variations ==
- Garguilo (misspelling)
- Gargulio
- Gargiula
- Gargiullo
- Gurgiolo
- Cargiulo
- Corjulo (U.S. variant spelling)
- Garguiolo

== Notable individuals surnamed Gargiulo ==
- Anthony Gargiulo (born 1984), American former football player
- Anton Gargiulo, New Zealand badminton player
- Antonino Bonaventura Gargiulo (1848–1904), Italian monsignor, editor, publisher and Bishop of San Severo
- Domenico Gargiulo (1612–1679), Baroque painter, better known as Micco Spadaro
- Elvino Gargiulo (1925–2005), Italians serial killer
- Eric Gargiulo (born 1972), American wrestler and commentator
- Frank J. Gargiulo (born 1939) is an American Republican Party politician
- Juan Gargiulo (born 1992), Argentine football player
- Julian Gargiulo (born 1972), Italian-American concert pianist
- Lou Gargiulo, American real estate businessman and politician
- Ludovico Gargiulo (born 1995), Italian football player
- Mario Gargiulo (born 1996), Italian footballer
- Michael Gargiulo (born 1976), American serial killer
- Michael Gargiulo (journalist) (born 1960), American television news anchor
- Nick Gargiulo (born 2000), American football player
- Rafael Gargiulo (born 1936), Argentine boxer
- Theodore L. Gargiulo (1915–2006), American conductor, composer and musicologist

=== Gargiullo ===
- Alfredo Gargiullo (1906–1928), Italian sprinter

=== Garguilo ===
- Neil Garguilo (born 1982), American writer, producer, director and actor

== See also ==
- Gargiulo's Italian Restaurant
- What if Gargiulo Finds Out?

== Sources ==
- De Felice, Emideo (1980). I Cognomi Italiani Rilevamenti Quantitativi dagli Elenchi Telefonici; Informazione Socio Economiche e Culturali, Onomastiche e Linguistiche (in Italian). Bologna: Società Editrice il Mulino.
- Norwalk, Jay (1999). Genealogy of the Gargiulo Family of Capri, and Related Families of Vuotto, Lembo, and DeMartino. Newcastle, Me.: Axion Press. 330 pages.
- Norwalk, Jay; Federico, Angela (2010). Some Gargiulo Families of Sorrento, Italy. A Study of a Large Community in the 17th and 18th Centuries, Including Photographs of 250 Records. Newcastle, Me.: Axion Press. 650 pages.
