= Prandi =

Prandi may refer to:

== People ==
- Enrichetta Thea Prandi (1922-1961), Italian actress and singer
- Elohim Prandi (born 1998), French handballer
- Giulio Prandi, Italian conductor and musicologist
- Jonathon Prandi (born 1972), American male fashion model, actor and IT consultant
- Kyle Prandi (born 1979), American diver
- Raoul Prandi (born 1969), former French Handballer
- Silvano Prandi (born 1947), Italian volleyball coach

== Places ==
- Prandi (river), Estonia
- Prandi, Estonia, village in Estonia
