= Lunette =

Architectural feature

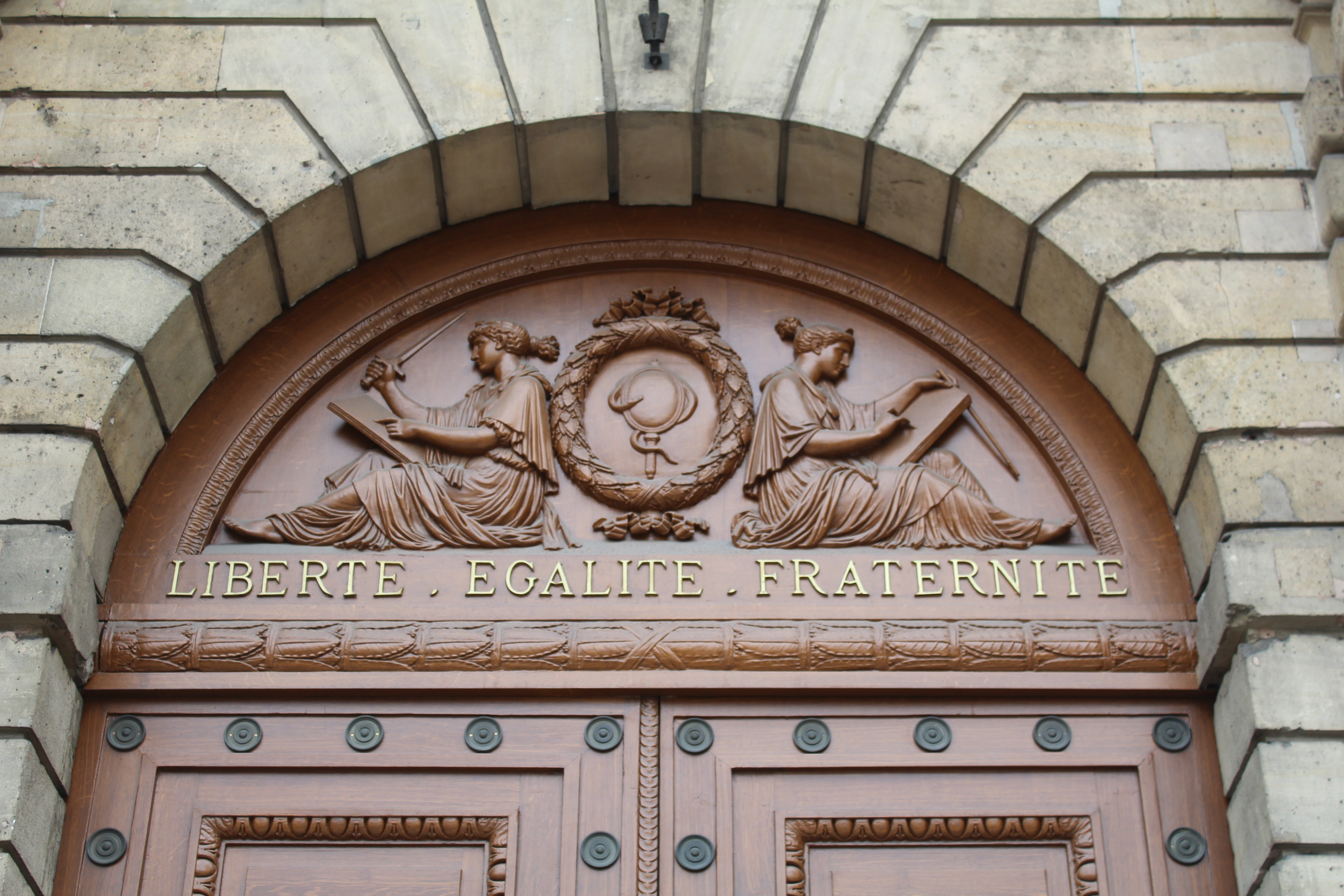
Lunette over the main door of the Luxembourg Palace in Paris.

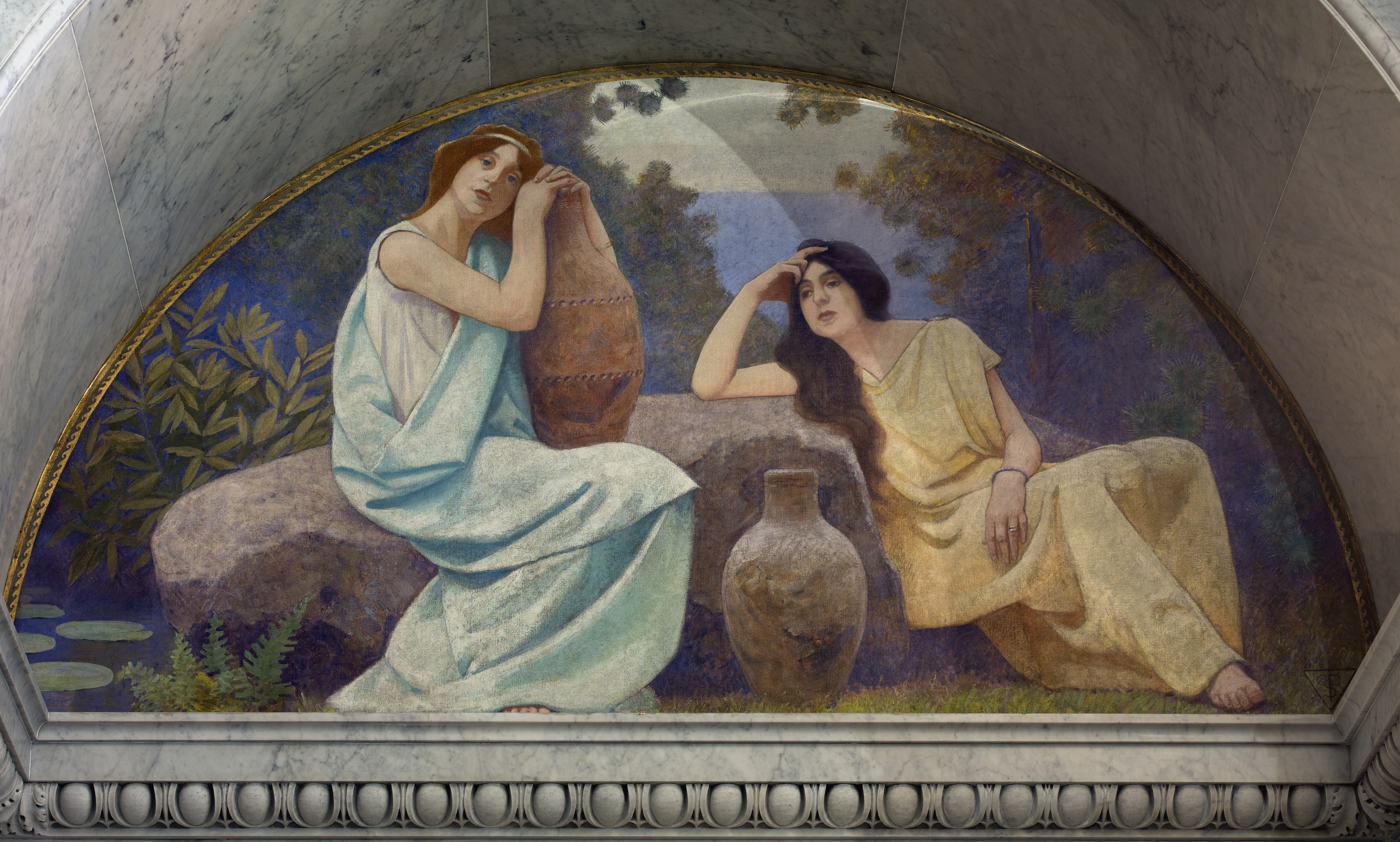
Charles Sprague Pearce, Rest (1896). Mural in a lunette in the Thomas Jefferson Building of the Library of Congress, Washington, D.C.

A lunette (French for 'little moon') is a crescent- or half-moon–shaped or semicircular architectural space or feature, variously filled with sculpture, painted, glazed, filled with recessed masonry, or void. A lunette may also be segmental, and the arch may be an arc taken from an ellipse. A lunette window is commonly called a half-moon window, or a fanlight if its muntins (the bars separating its panes) diverge radially.

== Appearance ==
If a door is set within a round-headed arch, the space within the arch above the door, masonry or glass is a lunette. If the door is a major access, and the lunette above is massive and deeply set, it may be called a tympanum.

A lunette is also formed when a horizontal cornice transects a round-headed arch at the level of the imposts, where the arch springs. If the top of the lunette itself is bordered by a hood mould it can also be considered a pediment.

== Usage ==
The term is also employed to describe the section of interior wall between the curves of a vault and its springing line. A system of intersecting vaults produces lunettes on the wall surfaces above a cornice. The lunettes in the structure of the Sistine Chapel ceiling inspired Michelangelo to come up with inventive compositions for the spaces.

== History ==
In the Neoclassical architecture of Robert Adam and his French contemporaries such as Ange-Jacques Gabriel, a favorite scheme set a series of windows within shallow blind arches. The lunettes above lent themselves to radiating motifs: a sunburst of bellflower husks, radiating fluting, a low vase of flowers, etc.

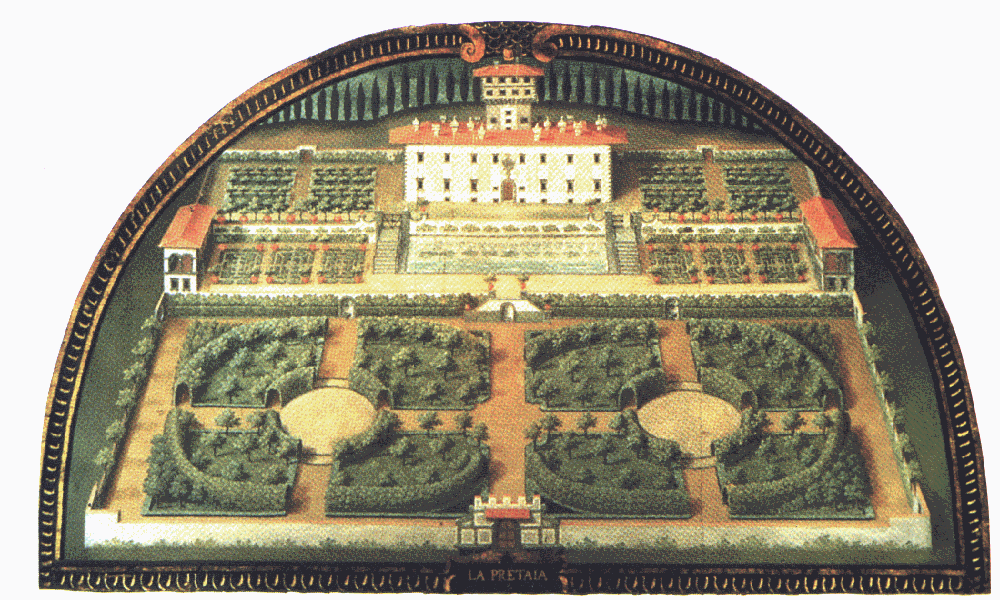
Villa La Petraia in lunette form by Giusto Utens.

The Flemish painter Giusto Utens rendered a series of Medicean villas in lunette form for the third grand duke of Tuscany, Ferdinando I, in 1599–1602.

== See also ==
- Fanlight
