= Frank Hyde (painter) =

British painter

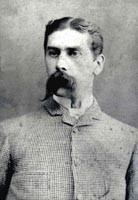
- Frank Hyde in 1878
- Born: 1849; London, England
- Died: 4 September 1937 (aged 87)
- Known for: Painting

Frank Hyde (1849–1937) was a British portrait and figure painter. He was a war artist and portrait painter, best known for his works of Capri. He also created comic characters for greeting cards for Raphael Tuck.

== Early life and education ==
Frank Hyde was born in Surrey to a gentleman who retired from the army, Captain John Francis, and Elizabeth Gudge Hyde in 1849. His father inherited Hyde End Manor, the family seat and a 1,500-acre estate in Berkshire, where he grew up with five brothers.

Hyde studied and exhibited his works of art in London at the Royal Academy of Arts. Later, Hyde inherited Hyde End Manor and later sold it.

== Career ==
During the Franco-Prussian War of 1870–71, he served the Royal Engineers as a 1st Lieutenant and then began created illustrations for The Graphic, working as a war artist. Battle of Sedan was depicted by Hyde for The Graphic.

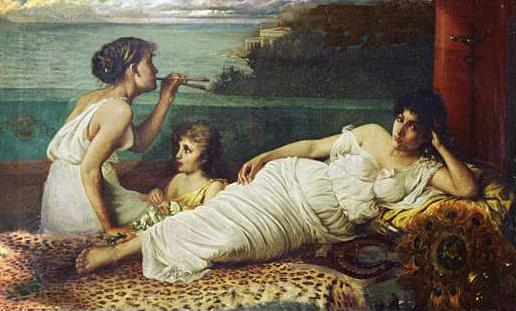
Portrait of Rosina Ferrara (around 1880)

In the late 1870s, he purchased a villa or the former Santa Teresa monastery at Anacapri on the island of Capri, where he made portraits of local model Rosina Ferrara and became a friend of John Singer Sargent. In 1914, he wrote the article Island of the Sirens about Capri for the International Studio about the allure of the people, culture, and island for artists over the years. It was one of many travel articles written by Hyde.

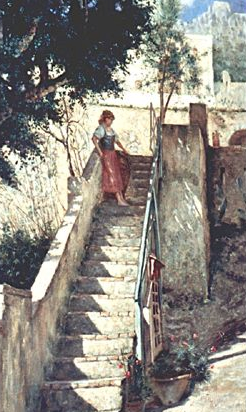
Steps at Capri

He is likely best known for his paintings of Ferrara and the one entitled Capri. In the late 1880s, he made the painting The Eton Boy.

During World War I, Hyde was a Captain and made paintings of the war, including First Battalion, the Royal West Kent, at Neuve Chapelle, 1914. An exhibit about the war, "Coming Home: Conflict & Care", at Maidstone Museum has shown three of his paintings, including Arrival of a Convoy of Wounded Soldiers at Maidstone East and Trones Wood, about the Queen's Own Royal West Kent Regiment.

His painting, Bugler Timmins RM, The Boy Hero, about 14-year-old World War I hero Charles Timmins of HMS Chatham, in the collection of Napier Road School is on loan to the Historic Dockyard in Chatham. Tug of War (1891) is in the collection of the Salford Museum and Art Gallery of Manchester. Capri Coastal Scene with Some Figures and Arrival of a Convoy of Wounded Soldiers at Maidstone East (1917) and in the collection of Maidstone Museum.

== Personal life ==
In November 1876, Hyde was married to Constance Mary Louise Felgate, who died within a year. In 1881, he married Florence Ellen Louise Rowley. In a year, they had a daughter named Mina and in 1884 had a son, Francis Angerstein Clarendon Rowley-Hyde. The couple divorced in 1887 and Florence died three years later.

Since the 1870s, Hyde travelled extensively. He then lived in Pett Wood Cottage, his final residence in England at Stockbury, Kent. He lived there for the rest of his life. He died while living there on 4 September 1937 and was buried on Sutton Road at the Maidstone Cemetery.
