= Nick Falcon =

American musician

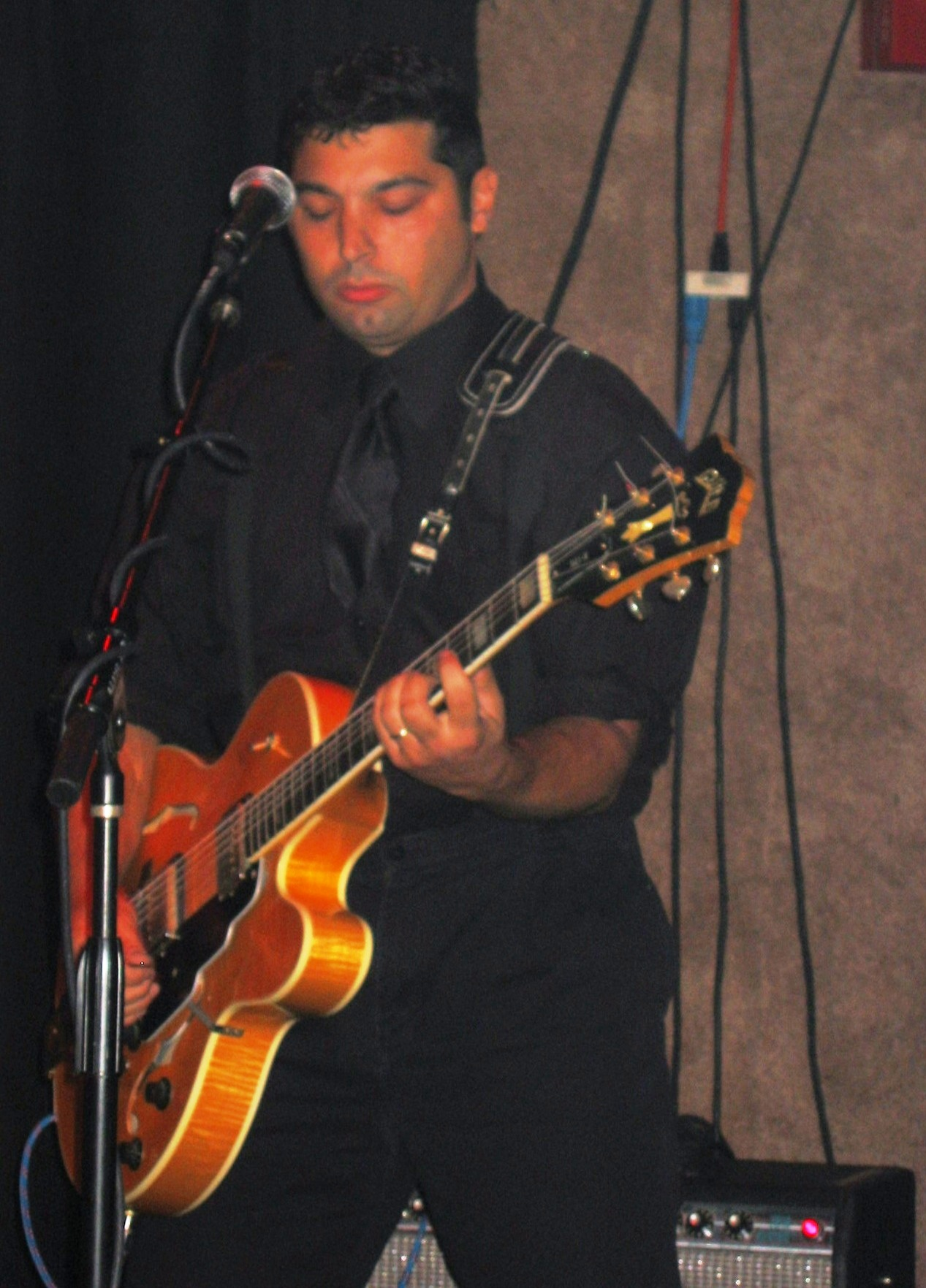
- Nick Falcon at the Knitting Factory (2006)

Background information
- Born: Nicholas Joseph DiFalco; 20 July 1968 (age 57); Philadelphia, Pennsylvania, USA
- Genres: Psychobilly, Rockabilly, Surf, Punk, Garage Rock, Indie rock, Alternative rock
- Instruments: Guitar, Vocals
- Years active: 2002 - present
- Website: http://www.theyoungwerewolves.com/

Nick Falcon (born Nicholas Joseph DiFalco; July 20, 1968) is an American musician best known as guitarist, composer, lyricist and singer of the band The Young Werewolves.

== Early life ==
Falcon was born in Philadelphia. An early interest in design and comics led to a career in the then nascent local graffiti scene. He grew up in the Overbrook section of the city and graduated from Robert E. Lamberton High School in 1986. As a teenager in the 1980s, Falcon was featured in The Philadelphia Inquirer, The Philadelphia Daily News and retrospectively in Print Magazine, Philadelphia Weekly and Philadelphia City Paper for his work as a noted graffiti writer. In 1984 his artwork was shown in an exclusive underground exhibit held at the defunct Kennel Club. He influenced many young writers, most notably by pioneering modern graffiti on freight trains. A synopsis of Falcon’s graffiti experience has been documented in the book The Art of Getting Over. Upon graduating High School, Falcon attended Temple University and studied communications and journalism which enabled him to launch his writing career under the pseudonym, Buford Youthward, for On the Go magazine published by Stephen Powers. He maintained a monthly column from 1999 until 2014 under the pseudonym for the Art Crimes website and was also interviewed in Adbusters under the assumed name. He enlisted in the U.S. Army in 1991 and served as a paratrooper for four years.

=== Music career ===
From an early age, Falcon had an interest in playing the guitar and after developing an affinity for rock and blues, moved on to swing and bebop, ultimately studying under Billy Bauer. While sharpening his skills, he managed a nightclub and worked as a retail promoter for Red Ant Records supporting diverse acts such as Cheap Trick, Ozzy Osbourne and Chick Corea.

== Young Werewolves ==
Falcon formed the band in 2002 after meeting drummer Jonny Wolf and bonding over a mutual respect for the Flat Duo Jets. Tryouts were held to fill in the rest of the group, which included lead singers, alto sax players and bassists, and several auditions later the duo met bassist Shewolf Dana Kain, completing the line up.

Falcon’s guitar style incorporates rockabilly, swing, and traditional rock while maintaining a clean sound with very limited use of effects, usually no more than reverb and vibrato. His main guitar is a 1988 Guild X-170 custom fit with a Bigsby and he uses a 1975 Fender Twin amplifier.
