= Bonaventura Gargiulo =

Italian bishop

Antonino Bonaventura Gargiulo (March 26, 1843 – May 9, 1904) was an Italian Capuchin friar, editor and publisher, and Roman Catholic Bishop of the Roman Catholic Diocese of San Severo, Italy.
