= Prandi (river) =

River in Estonia

Coordinates: 58°46′56.08″N 25°25′18.31″E

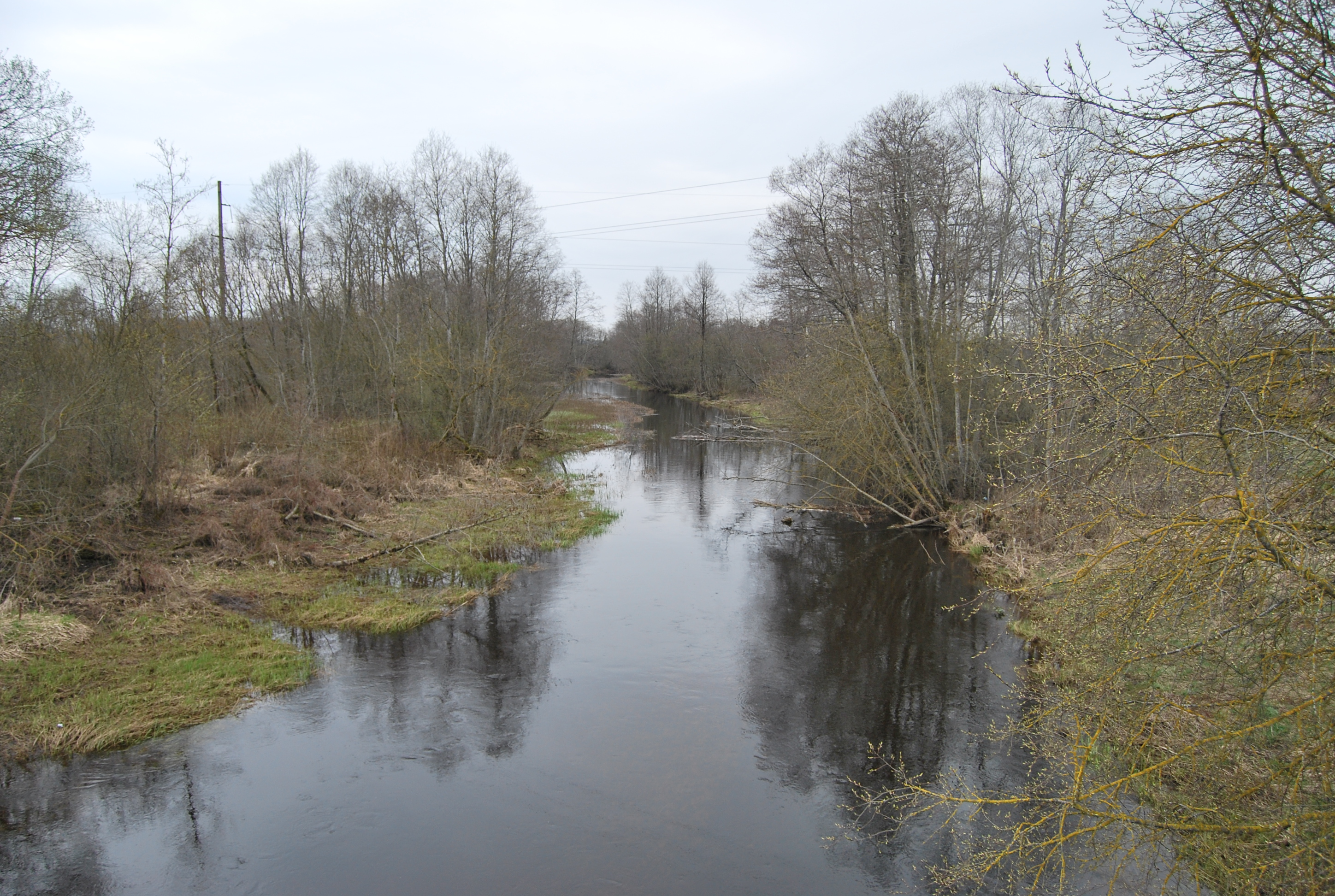
- The Prandi in the village of Näsuvere

Location
- Country: Estonia

Physical characteristics
- Source
  - location: Prandi Allikajärv
- Mouth
  - location: Pärnu
- Length: 25 km (16 mi)
- Basin size: 285 km^{2} (110 sq mi)

The Prandi is a 25 km (16 mi)-long river in Järva County, Estonia. Its source is Prandi Allikajärv in the village of Prandi, Koigi Parish. It is a left tributary of the Pärnu, which it flows into near Särevere in Vilita. The basin area of the Prandi is 285 km^{2}.

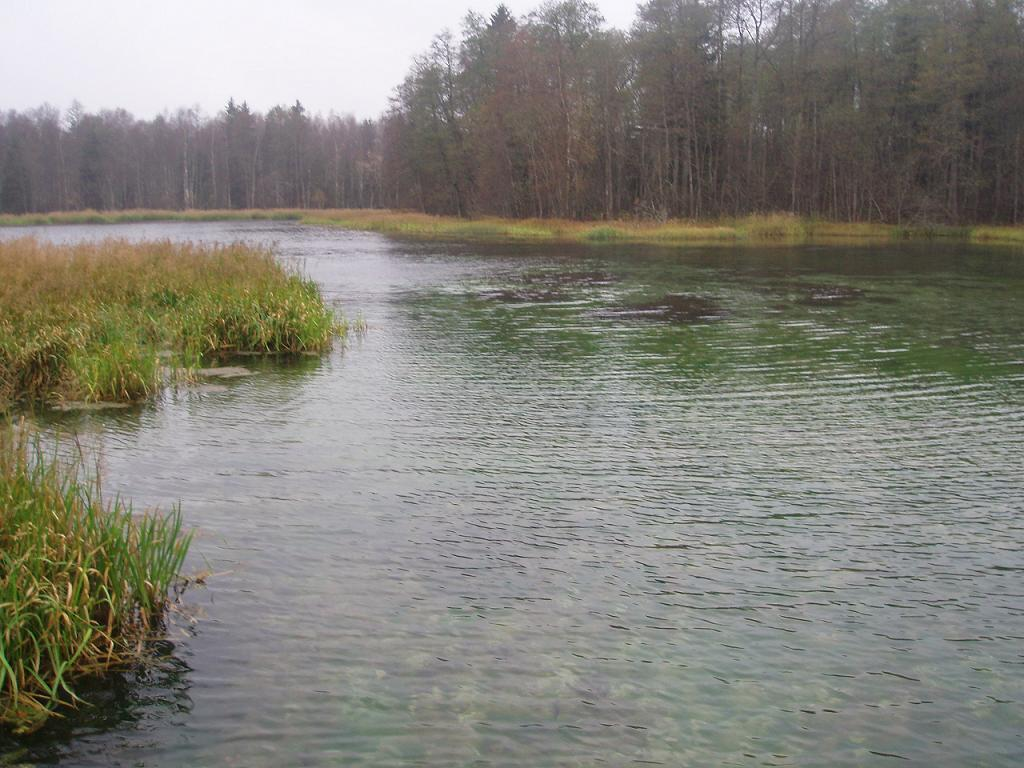
Prandi Allikajärv is the source of the Prandi.
