= Juan Gargiulo =

Argentine footballer

Personal information
- Full name: Juan Pablo Gargiulo
- Date of birth: 16 January 1992 (age 34)
- Place of birth: Mar del Plata, Argentina
- Height: 1.80 m (5 ft 11 in)
- Position: Defender

Team information
- Current team: Cairese

Senior career*
| Years | Team | Apps | (Gls) |
| 2012–2016 | Aldosivi | 11 | (1) |
| 2016 | Quintanar del Rey | | |
| 2016–2017 | Marbella | | |
| 2016–2017 | → Mantova (loan) | 16 | (0) |
| 2017–2019 | Albissola | 41 | (4) |
| 2019–2023 | Albenga | | |
| 2023– | Cairese | 5 | (0) |
- * Club domestic league appearances and goals as of 10 November 2024

Juan Pablo Gargiulo (born 16 January 1992) is an Argentine footballer who plays as a defender for Italian Serie D club Cairese.

== Club career ==
Gargiulo started his career in his home town club Aldosivi, playing in the Primera B Nacional. He signed to Spain in 2016 to lower league team Quintanar del Rey. He spent here only 7 months, before he was sold to Marbella. On the next day, the Segunda División B team loaned him to Italian Lega Pro side Mantova. At the end of 2016–17 season, Serie D side Albissola signed him.

On 30 July 2019, he joined Eccellenza side Albenga.

== Sources ==
- Juan Gargiulo at TuttoCalciatori.net (in Italian)
- Juan Gargiulo at Soccerway (archived)
