= Charles Sprague Pearce =

American painter (1851–1914)

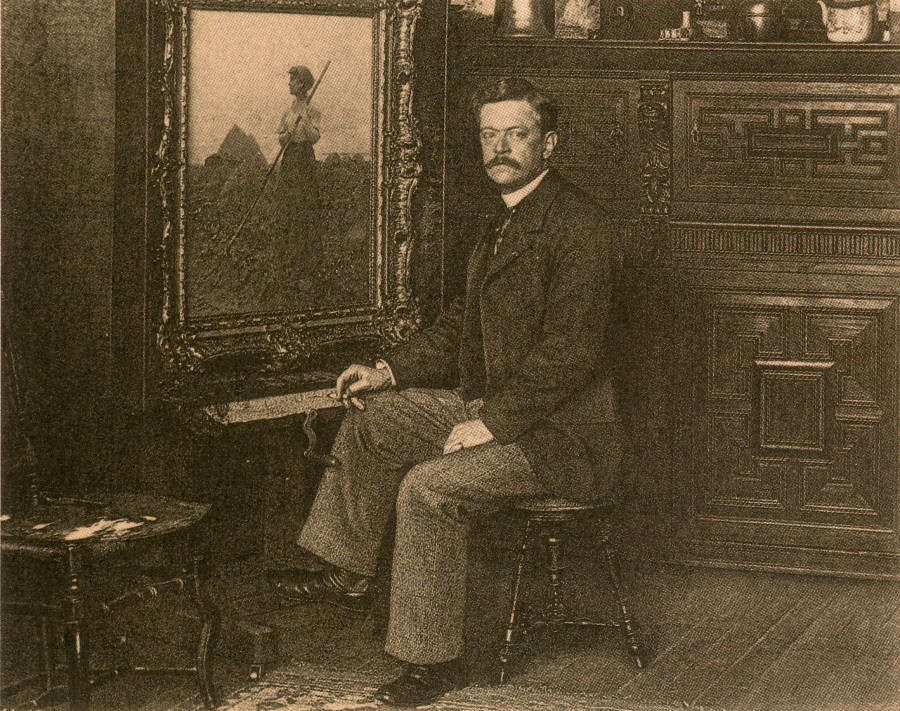
- Pearce in his studio in Auvers-sur-Oise, c. 1895
- Born: October 13, 1851; Boston, Massachusetts
- Died: May 18, 1914 (aged 62); Auvers-sur-Oise
- Education: Léon Bonnat in Paris
- Known for: Painter, draughtsman, sculptor and print-maker
- Movement: Orientalist
- Awards: Chevalier of the French Legion of Honor: Order of Leopold, Belgium; Order of the Red Eagle, Prussia, and Order of the Dannebrog, Denmark.

Charles Sprague Pearce (October 13, 1851 – May 18, 1914) was an American artist.

== Biography ==
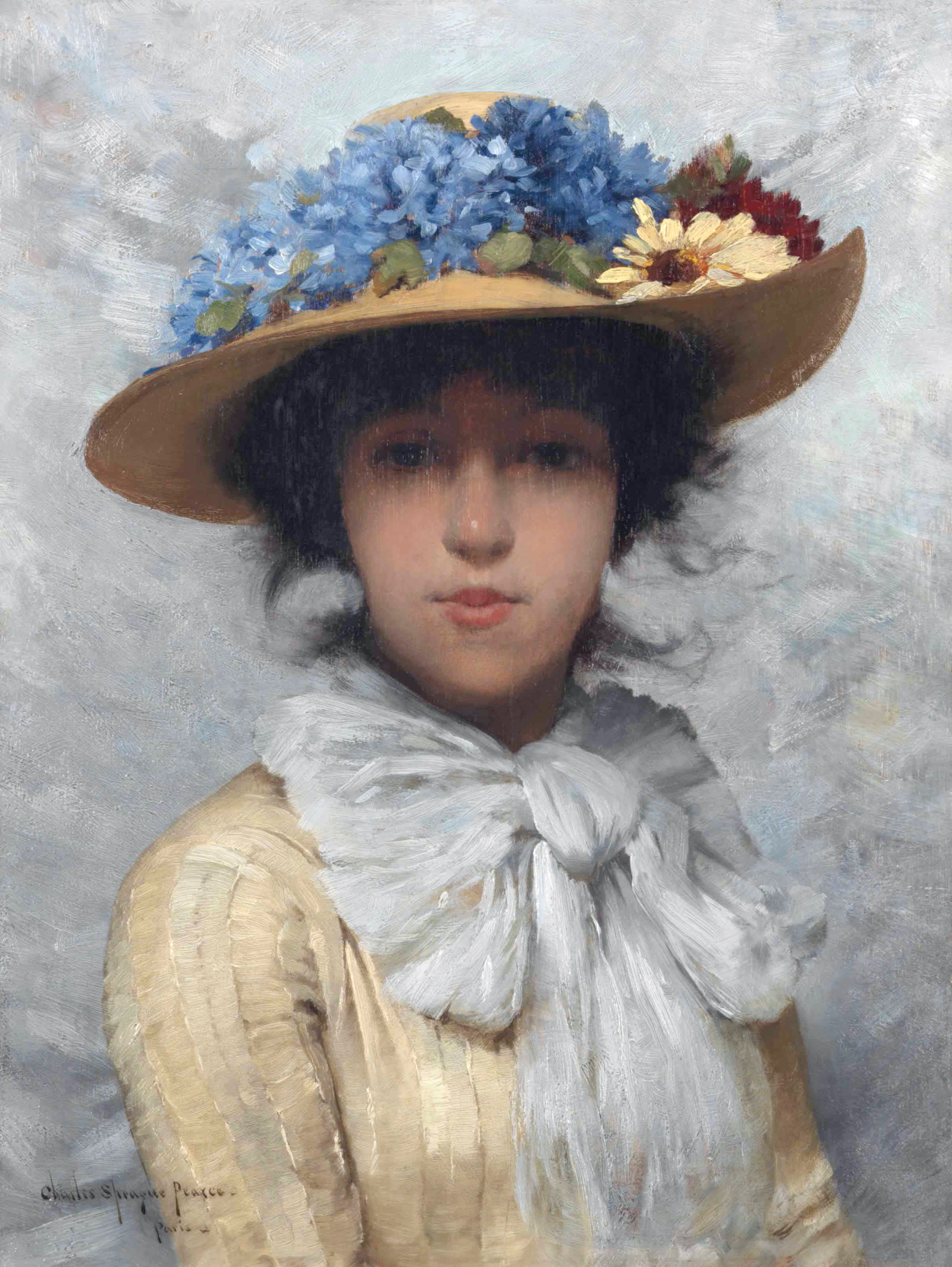
Woman in white dress and straw hat (c. 1880)

Pearce was born in Boston, Massachusetts. In 1873 he became a pupil of Léon Bonnat in Paris, and after 1885 he lived in Paris and at Auvers-sur-Oise. He painted Egyptian and Algerian scenes, French peasants, and portraits, and also decorative work, notably for the Thomas Jefferson Building at the Library of Congress at Washington. He received medals at the Paris Salon and elsewhere, and was made Chevalier of the French Legion of Honor, decorated with the Order of Leopold, Belgium, the Order of the Red Eagle, Prussia, and the Order of the Dannebrog, Denmark.

== Works ==
Among his best-known paintings are The Decapitation of St John the Baptist (1881); Prayer (1884), The Return of the Flock, and Meditation. Pearce was also among those who knew and painted the Capri muse Rosina Ferrara.

== Images ==
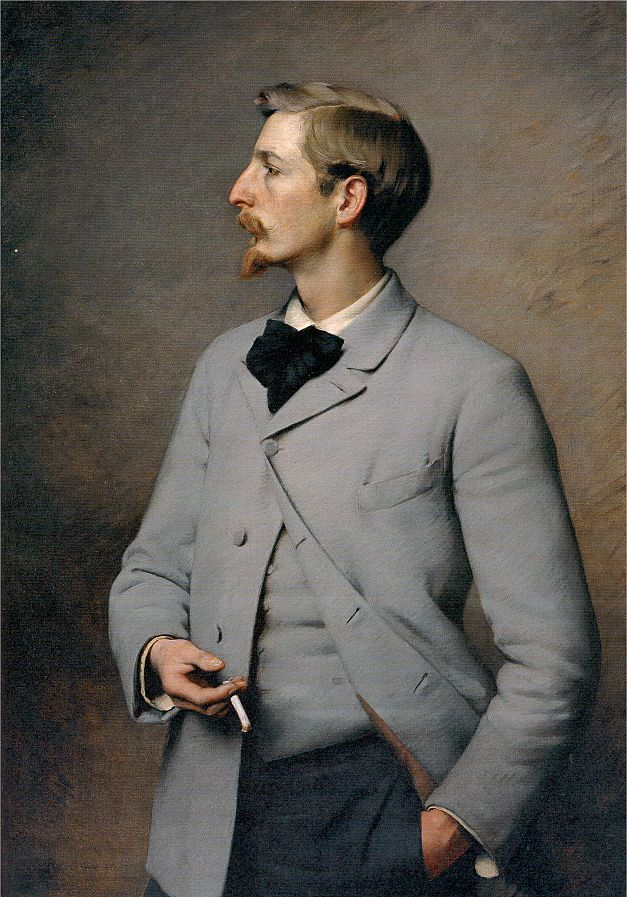
Paul Wayland Bartlett (1890)

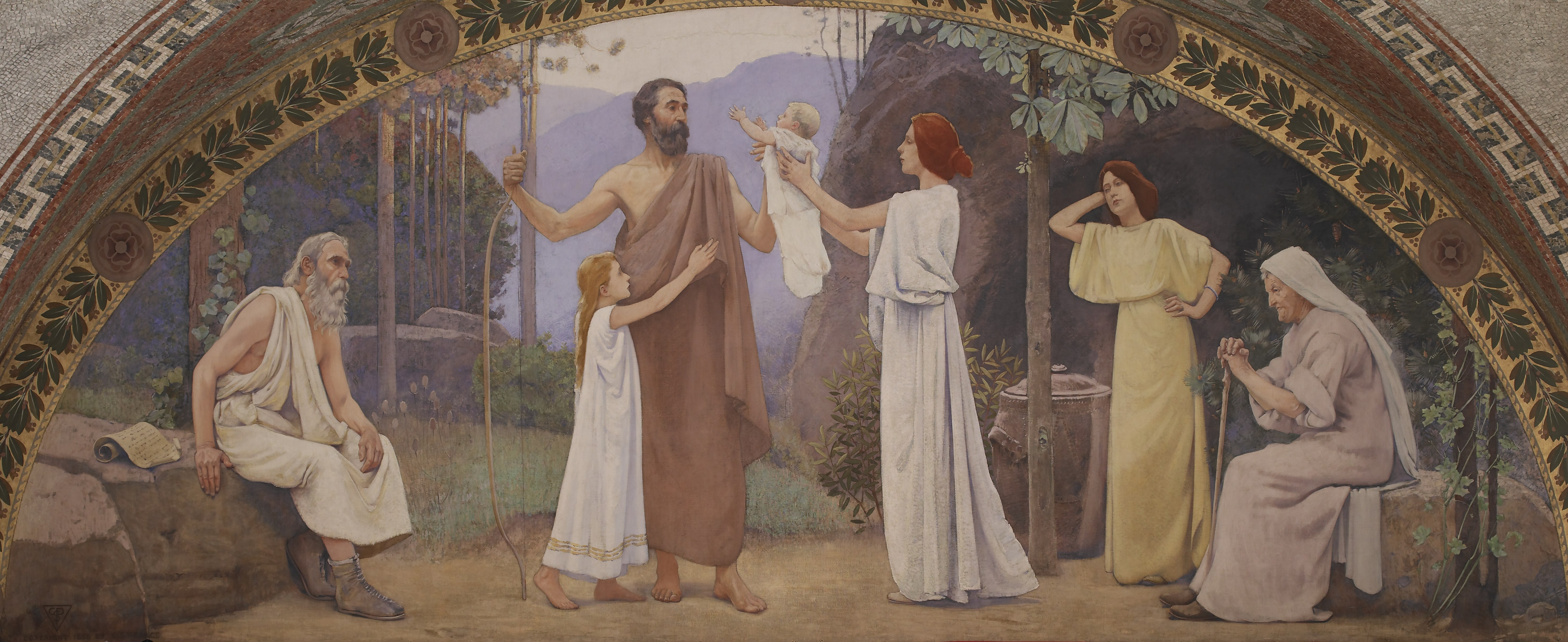
Family (1896)

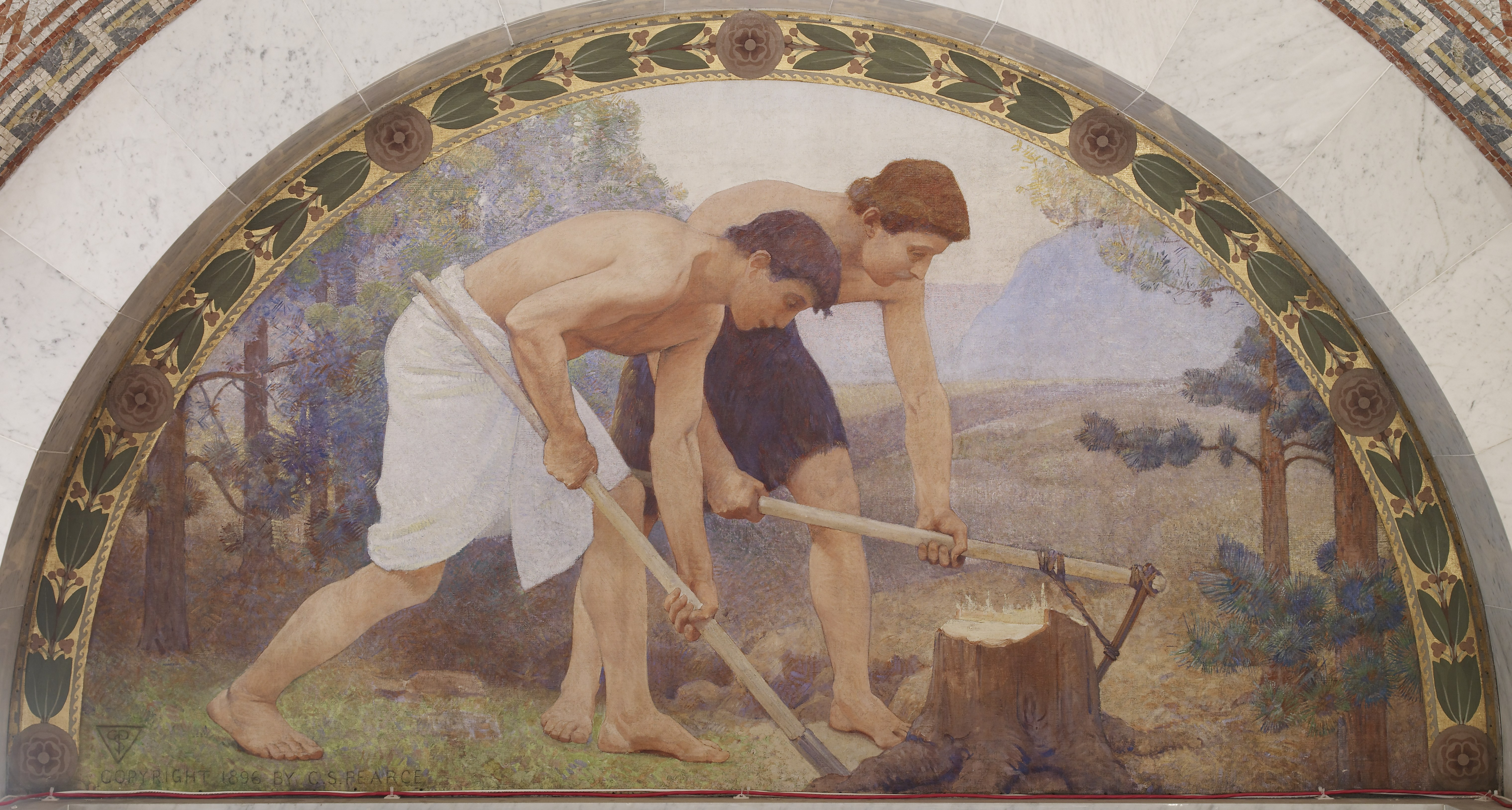
Labor (1896)

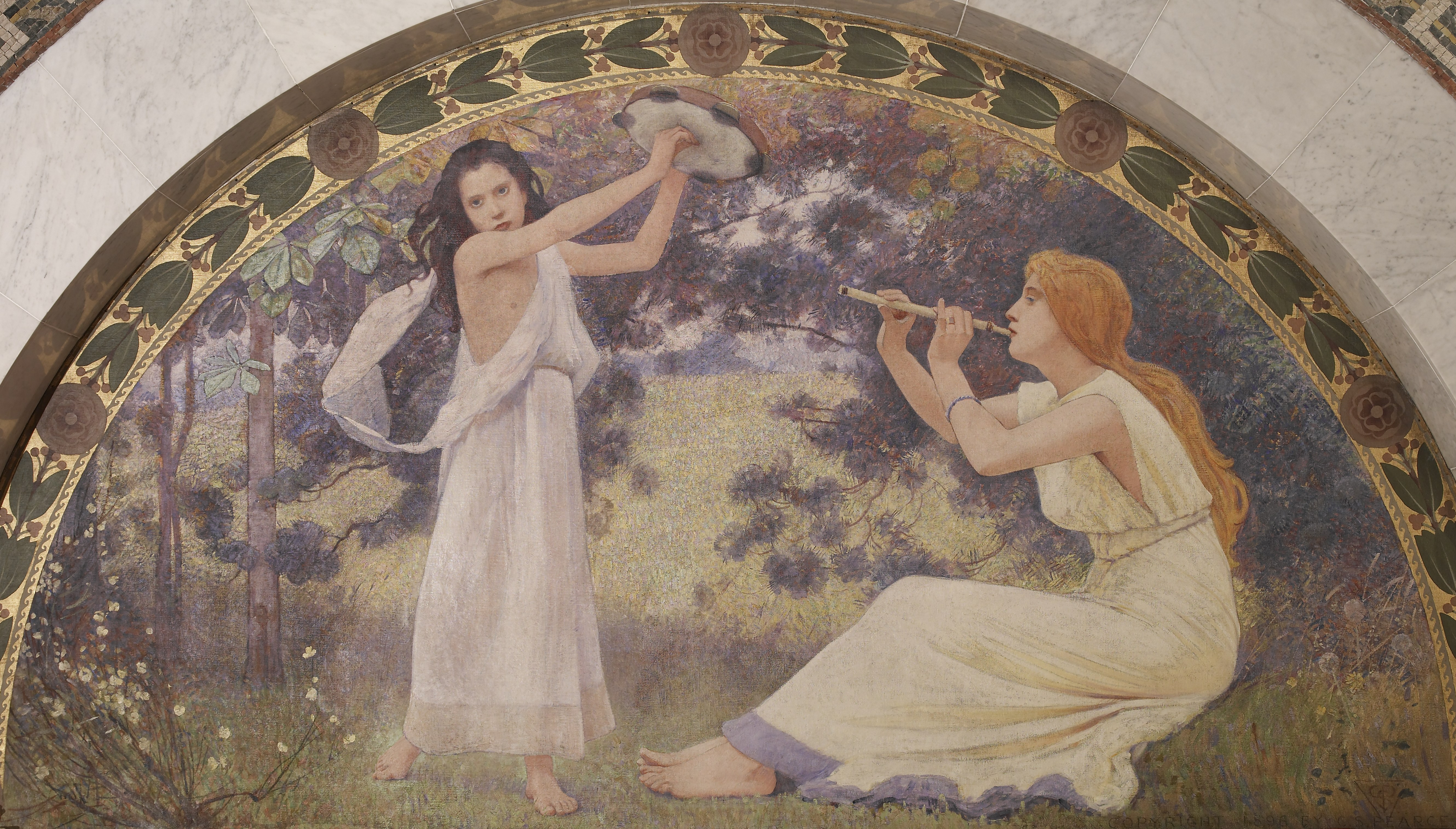
Recreation (1896)

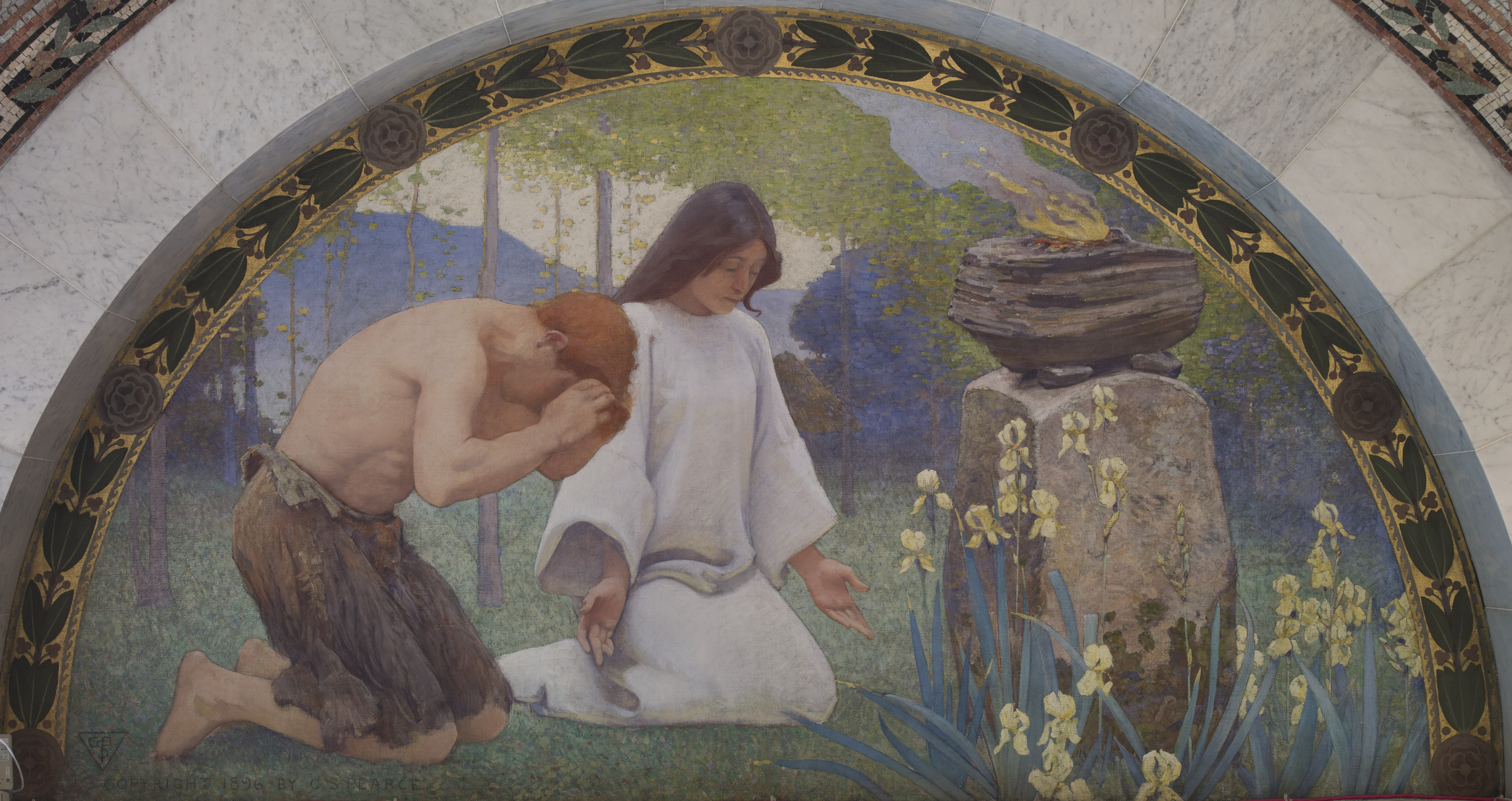
Religion (1896)

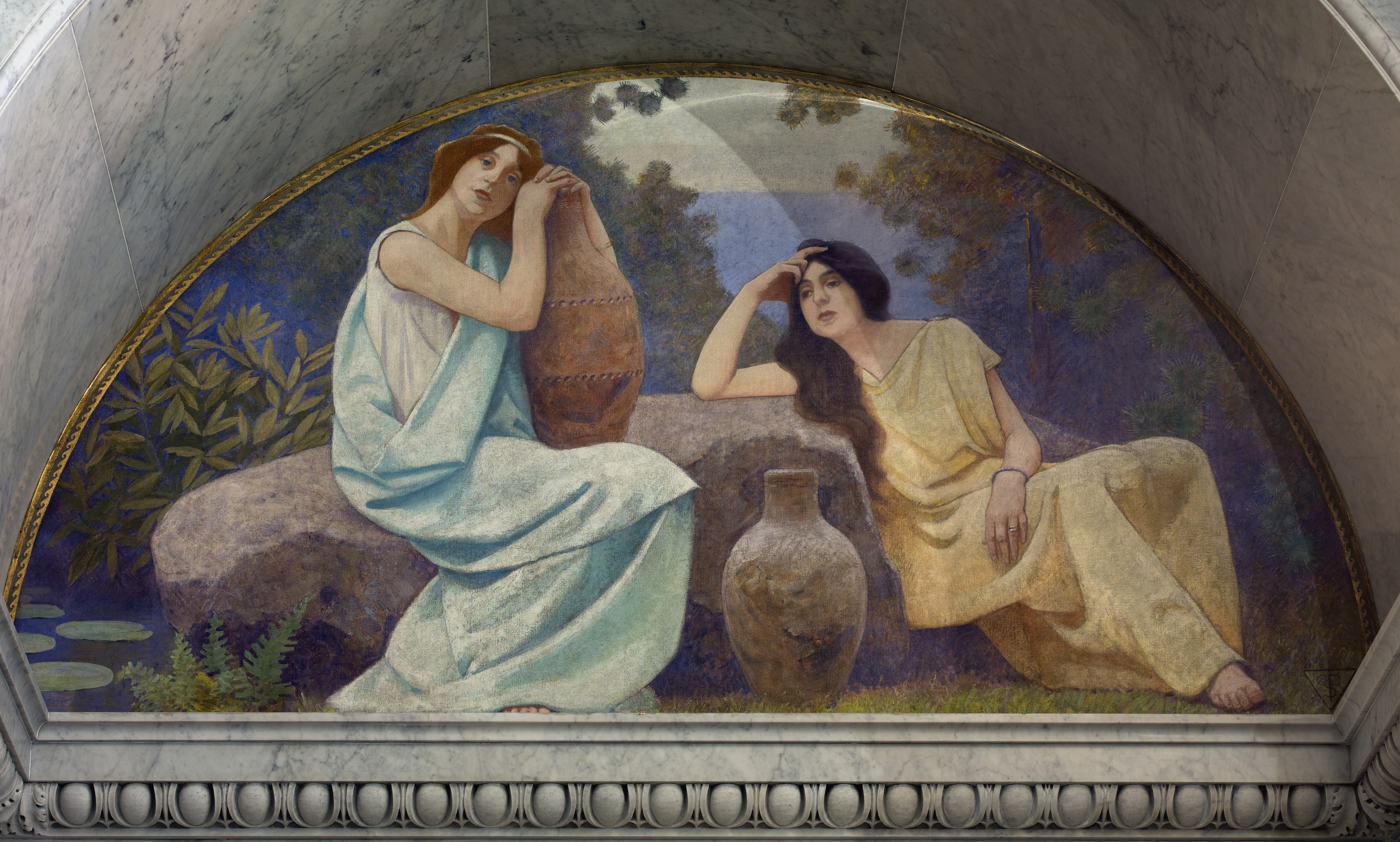
Rest (1896)

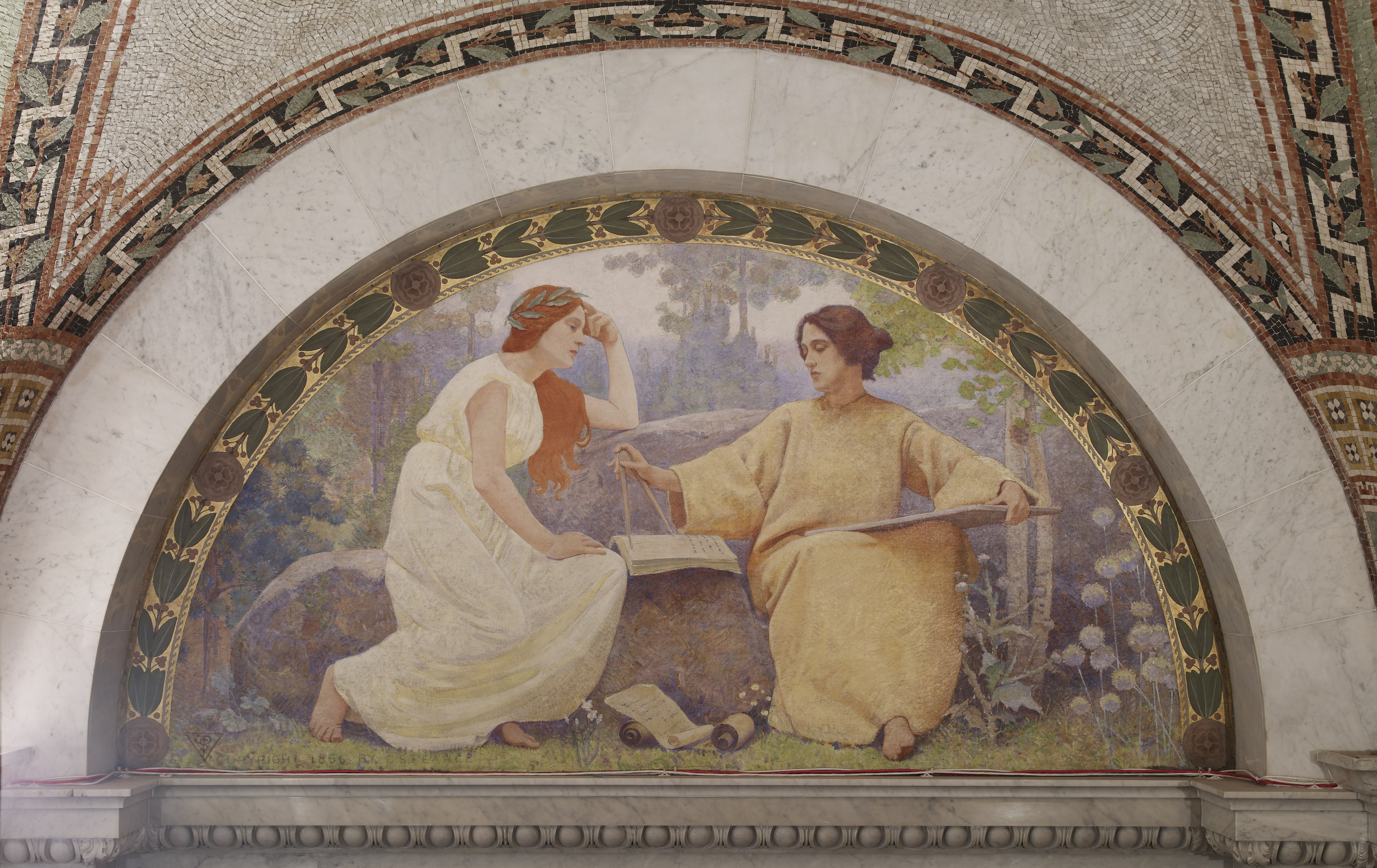
Study (1896)
