= Mario Nugara =

American ballet director

Mario Nugara is an American ballet artist, director and teacher. He is the founder and artistic director of the City of Angels Ballet School. Artistic Director of the California Riverside Ballet from 2010 to 2015.

Born in Pittsburgh, Pennsylvania, of Italian (Sicilian) and Polish descent, parents Millio Nugara Jr and Irene (Bober) Nugara, the second of four children. He started training at the age of 8. He received a full scholarship to train at the School of American Ballet, official school of the New York City Ballet. Danced with Boston Ballet, Fort Worth Ballet, on Broadway and guest artist with numerous ballet companies. Dancing mostly classics and Balanchine. Obtained a BFA and MFA from New York University's Tisch School of the Arts. He is the first ballet dancer to be awarded a Fulbright Scholarship. The Fulbright Scholarship was in conjunction with the Royal Danish Ballet and the University of Copenhagen. During this time he taught at the Royal Danish Ballet, Culberg Ballet, Ballet Academy of Stockholm, the New Danish Dance Theatre, the Marie Brolin – Tani Dance Theatre, and Dansens Hus.

Mario studied at the School of American Ballet, with Stanley Williams, Richard Rapp, Andrei Kramarevsky, Alexandra Danilova, Antonina Tumkovsky, Muriel Stuart, and John Taras, and with distinguished ballet instructors: Christina Bernal, Maggie Black, Edward Caton, Léonide Massine, Melissa Hayden and David Howard. He is the subject of a television documentary "Turning Point, City of Angels Ballet" and featured in the book "Unselfish, Love Thy Neighbor As Thy Selfie". Lives in Los Angeles, CA.

In 1990 he began working on the City of Angels Ballet a not for profit ballet academy for youth from underserved communities throughout Los Angeles. The City of Angels Ballet (CAB) has worked with over 35 schools in the Los Angeles Unified School District. CAB has educated over 50,000 children in the fine performing arts, doing community outreach, lecture demonstrations, career day opportunities and the after school ballet classes at no cost to the schools or families. CAB encourages higher education, most of the youth are the first in their families to attend college. He brought art, education and culture to the most underserved communities in Los Angeles.

LAUSD and CAB comparison stats:

These statistics are district-wide numbers, combining affluent with low income areas. Unfortunately, most of the students in CAB reside in high risk areas where these figures are higher in reality .

LAUSD statistics

30% drop-out rate

85 live births/1000

39% Body Composition Failure - Obesity

49% Aerobic fitness test failure

Using a CAB student count of 4000, this is the profile of students using LAUSD statistics.

~1200 CAB students would have dropped out of high school CAB 0 drop out

~319 girls would have babies -(based on 3600 girls in ballet school) CAB 0 teen pregnancy

~1600 of your students would be clinically obese CAB 0 Clinically obese

~2000 would have failed a basic aerobic fitness test CAB 0 fail basic aerobic fitness

List of Colleges and Universities CAB students have gone on to attend

UCLA, UC Santa Cruz, Cal State LA, Cal State Long Beach, Cal State Northridge, UC San Diego, LA City College, Pasadena City College, UC Berkeley, UC Santa Barbara, University of Southern California, New York University, Wellesley College, UC Riverside, Bennington, Stanford University, Yale University and Columbia University.

A few have gone on to dance professionally: American Ballet Theatre, Boston Ballet, Lines Ballet San Francisco, Tucson Ballet

Performed at theaters; Music Center of LA, Japan American Theater, Segerstrom Theater, Universal Amphitheater, LA County Museum of Art, Fox Theater Riverside, CA, East LA City College, Los Angeles City College, Children’s Hospital LA.
