= Rosina Ferrara =

Italian artist's model from the island of Capri (1861–1934)

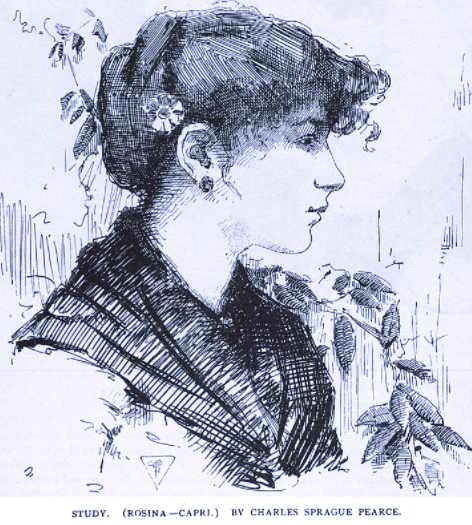
Charles Sprague Pearce, Study, Rosina, Capri, 1880

Rosina Ferrara (1861–1934) was an Italian artist's model from the island of Capri, who became the favorite muse of American expatriate artist John Singer Sargent. Captivated by her exotic beauty, a variety of 19th-century artists, including Charles Sprague Pearce, Frank Hyde, and George Randolph Barse, made works of art of her. Ferrara was featured in the 2003 art exhibit "Sargent's Women" at New York City's Adelson Galleries, as well as in the book Sargent's Women published that year.

At about the age of thirty, Ferrara married Barse and they moved to the United States, settling in Westchester County, New York.

== Background ==
In the 19th century, American and European painters and writers traveled to the island of Capri for its beautiful coastline, blue-green water, architecture, relaxed and rich culture and the "exceptional beauty of its people" who are a mix of descendants of Roman, Greek, and Phoenician people. For instance, inspired by the beautiful women from Capri and Naples, Alphonse de Lamartine wrote the romantic novel Graziella.

== Biography ==
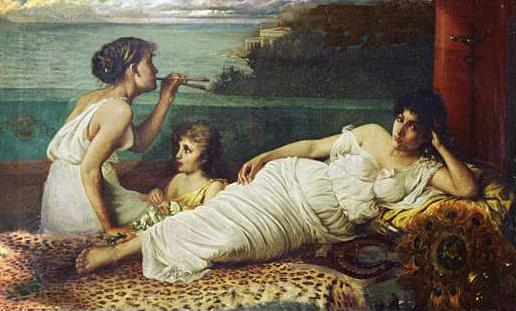
Frank Hyde, Rosina, c. 1880. Rosina reclined sensually on a couch, clad in a seductive classical toga while another young girl performs on a flute

Of Greek ancestry, Ferrara was born in Anacapri on the island of Capri in 1861. She is considered a descendant of Barbarossa, a 16th-century pirate.

Beginning in the 1870s, she modeled for European and American artists, including British artist Frank Hyde, who had a studio in the former Santa Teresa monastery.

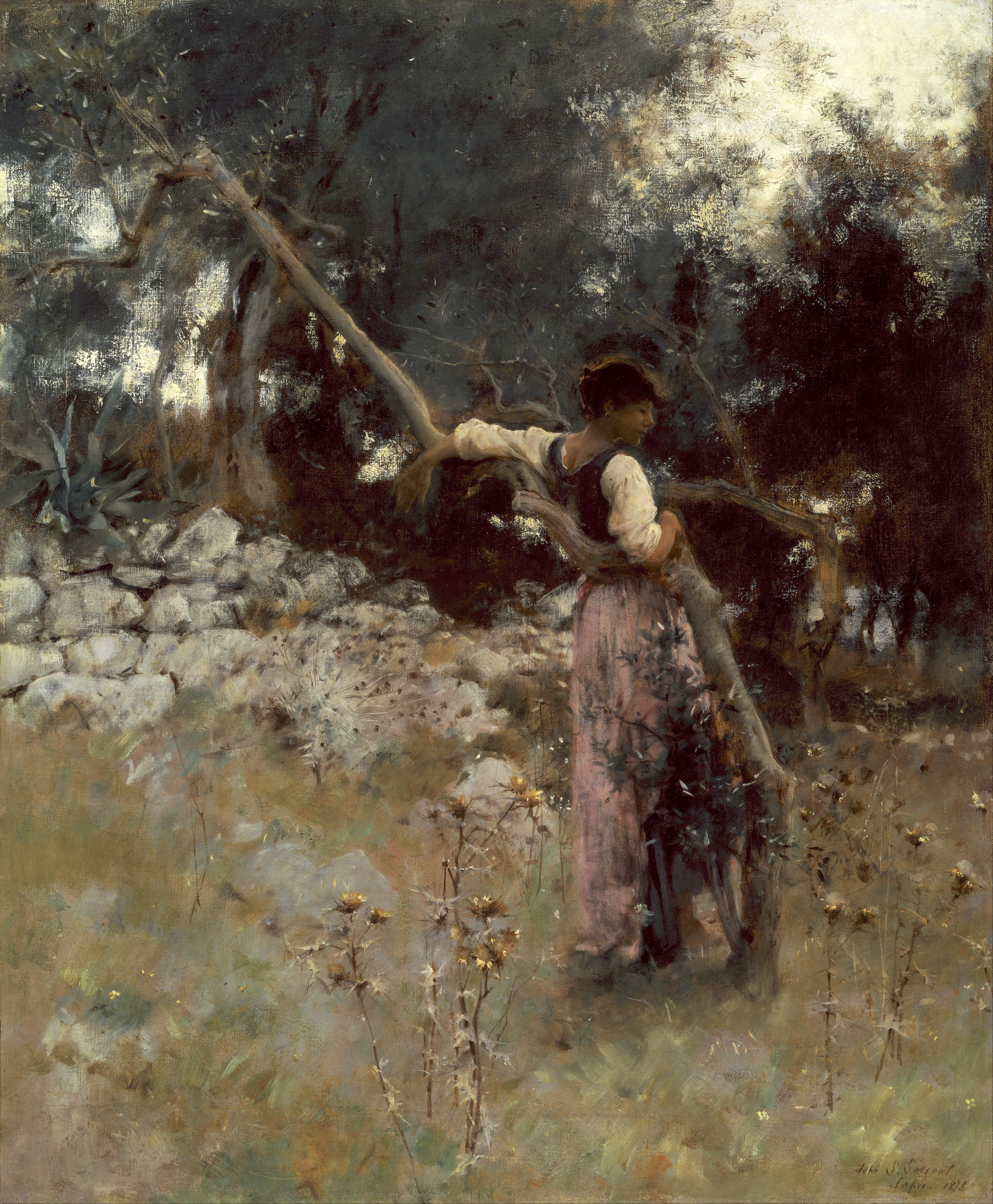
John Singer Sargent, A Capriote, 1878

John Singer Sargent came to Anacapri in the summer of 1878, as had other of his friends who were artists. While there, he met and became a friend of Frank Hyde and worked in his studio. Taken by Ferrara's beauty, he made twelve paintings of her over one year, including A Capriote, Head of an Anacapri Girl, and Capri Girl on a Rooftop.

In 1891 in Rome, she married American painter George Randolph Barse of Detroit and moved to the United States shortly after the marriage. They lived in Katonah, Westchester County, New York. In 1934, Ferrara died of pneumonia. Four years after her death, Barse committed suicide at his home in Katonah.

== Image in art and culture ==
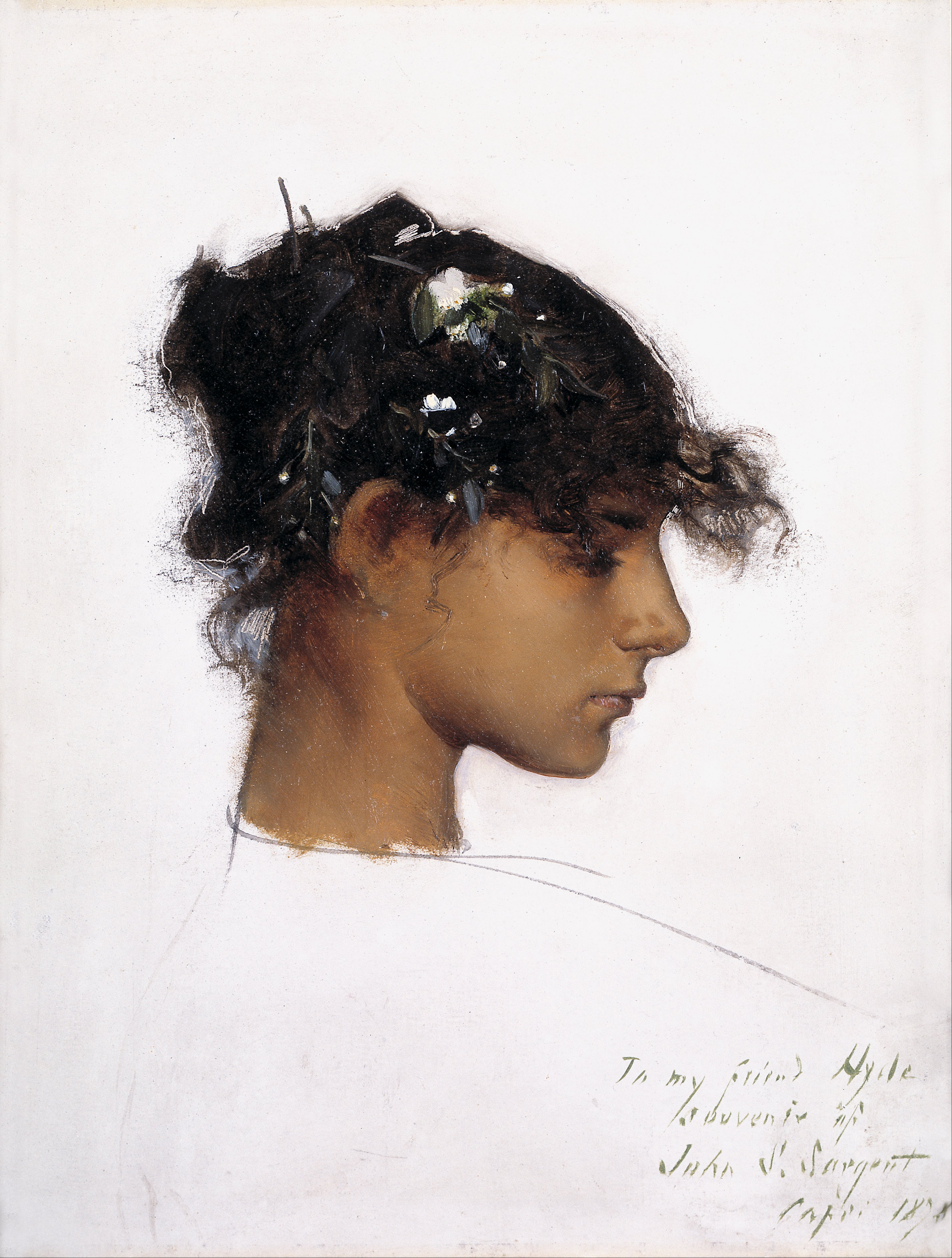
John Singer Sargent, Rosina Ferrara, Head of Anacapri Girl, 1878, Berger Collection Educational Trust. Sargent, who gave the work to Frank Hyde, made an inscription in the lower right-hand corner of the painting.

Ferrara was described by various painters as having the look of an Arab or Greek, the type seen in classical art such as that of Ancient Greece. Greek colonists settled in Capri in ancient times and left their mark in their descendants. When Charles Sprague Pearce showed his cabinet picture of Rosina for the Salon of 1882 he described her as "the tawney skinned, panther eyed, elf-like Rosina, wildest and lithest of all the savage creatures on the savage isle of Capri."

English painter Adrian Stokes wrote of Rosina: "It used to be very easy for artists to find models; but now the grown-up girls are rather shy of strangers, and the priests think it is dangerous for them to pose. For all of that, there are some regular models to be had. Rosina is considered the first on the island, and certainly is a remarkably handsome young woman. She sits perfectly as a model of London or Paris."

One of the John Singer Sargent paintings, Dans les Oliviers à Capri (Among the Olive Trees, Capri), was shown at the Salon of 1879 in Paris. Another version of the painting, A Capriote, held by the Museum of Fine Arts, Boston, was submitted to the Society of American Artists in New York in March 1879 for its annual exhibition. The museum describes the painting of Rosina, "Her twisted stance echoes the forms of the branches, expressing a kinship between them of wild and natural beauty. Sargent equates his model with a classically inspired dryad, making her an elemental part of the wild Capri landscape." He also made a third painting of the same setting.

=== List of paintings ===
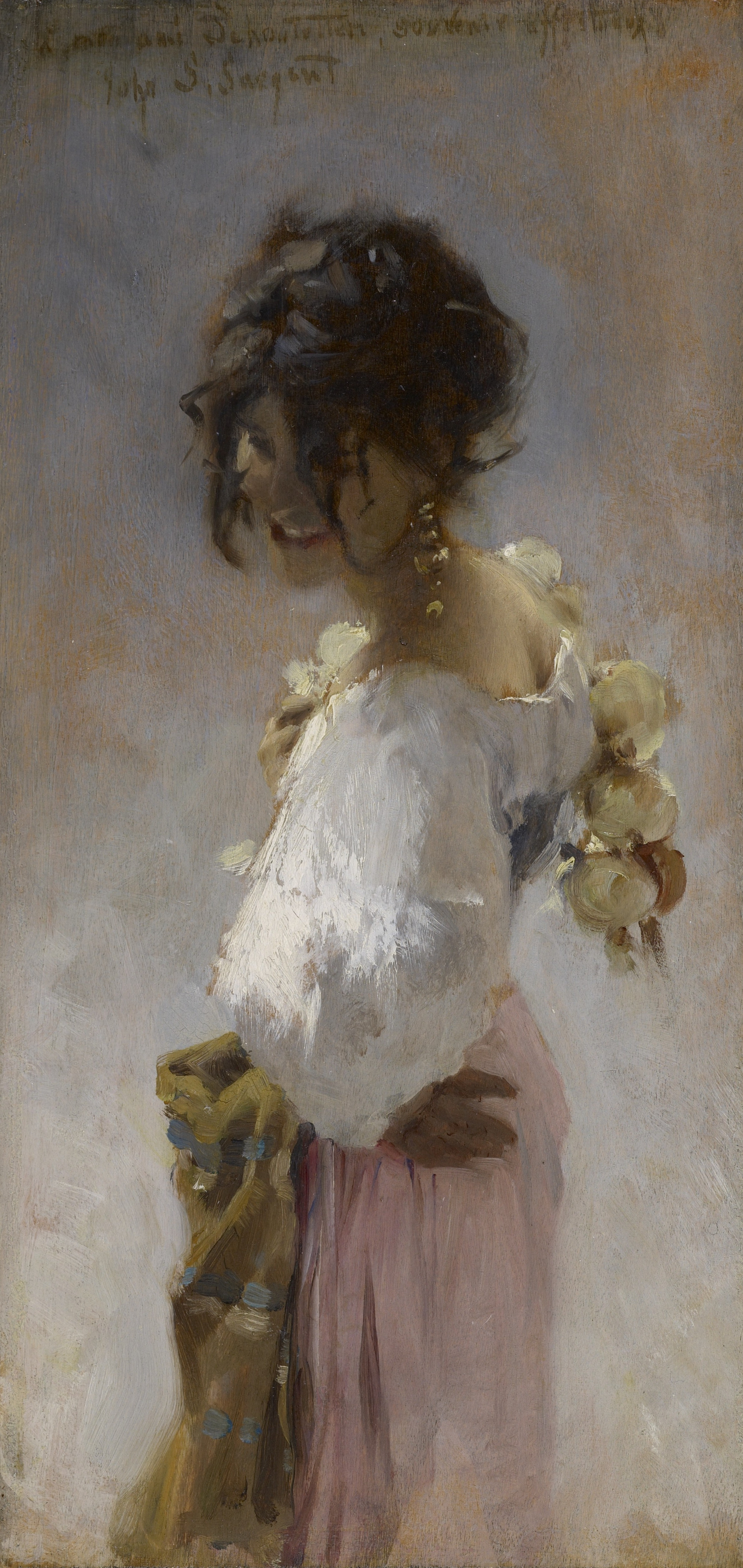
John Singer Sargent, Rosina, 1878, depicting Ferrara

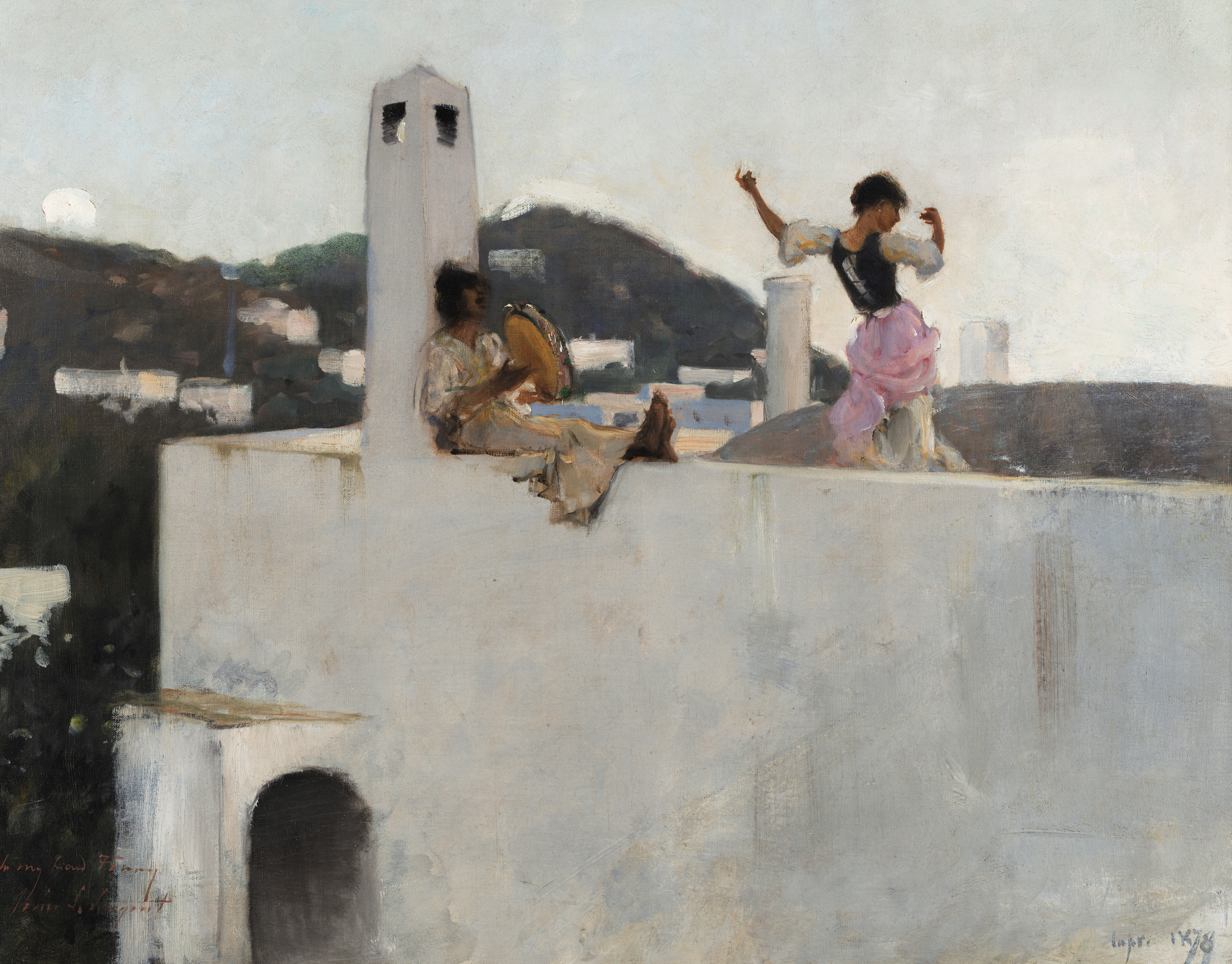
John Singer Sargent, Capri Girl on a Rooftop, 1878, Crystal Bridges Museum of American Art, Rosina Ferrara doing a tarantella dance on the rooftop

John Singer Sargent, primarily painted in 1878:

- A Capriote - Museum of Fine Arts, Boston
- Capri or Rosina Ferrara and Unidentified Woman - Westervelt Company, Tuscaloosa
- Capri Girl on a Rooftop - Crystal Bridges Museum of American Art
- Capri Peasant, Study or Study Head for the Capri Girl - Private collection, formerly in the collection of Violet Sargent Ormund (John Singer Sargent's sister)
- Dans les Oliviers à Capri - Private collection
- Dans les Oliviers à Capri - Private collection (third of three near identical paintings, two known today by the same name and the third A Capriote)
- Head of Anacapri Girl or Rosina Ferrara - Private collection
- Head of Rosina - Denver Art Museum
- Rosina - Colby College Museum of Art, Waterville, Maine
- Rosina Ferrara, 1882 - Private collection
- Rosina Ferrara, Head of Anacapri Girl - Berger Collection Educational Trust
- Rosina Ferrara - The Capri - Private collection
- Stringing Onions - Private collection, "Sargent's Women" exhibit
- View of Capri or Rosina Ferrara- Yale University Art Gallery, New Haven

Other artists:

- Donna Rosina by George Randolph Barse - Speed Art Museum, Louisville, Kentucky
- Rosina Ferrara or Rosina by Charles Sprague Pearce
- Rosina by Frank Hyde (1880) - Private collection
