= L. Scinti Roger =

Italian composer

Luigi Scinti Roger (15 January 1885 – 10 February 1964) was an Italian composer, who emigrated to New York in 1910, and composed music mainly for Italian immigrants in United States.

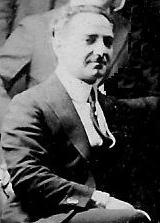
Luigi Scinti Roger

Sometimes known as Louis Roger, he was a talented organist, pianist and orchestra leader. He played in several theaters in United States and Canada including La Sirena Theater, the Verdi Theater and the Naples Garden Theater in Rhode Island and the Columbia Theater in New York. He wrote music for several songs including Vieneme ‘nzuonno Napule!, and he composed marches, symphonies and musical dramas, among them, Voglio Turnà a Mamma, ’O Ritorno d’ o ferito, A parteza pè Tripoli, O Richiamato.

== Biography ==
Born on 16 January 1885 in Santa Maria a Vico, Italy, Luigi Scinti Roger was the son of Baron Tommaso Scinti Roger and Lady Vincenza Petrucci.

He studied music at the San Pietro a Maiella Conservatory in Naples. But he said to be a composer already when he was eleven years old, when he used to be up early on Sundays, singing and playing in several Churches. He was a friend of the famous Italian musician E.A. Mario (real name Giovanni Ermete Gaeta), and also of the famous inventor of the wireless, Guglielmo Marconi. Luigi earned a Certificate of Radio Operator signed by the inventor of wireless, one of the first awarded in this field.

For about 4 years in his youth Luigi travelled on the big liners as a wireless operator, then as chief, but in his free time he liked to play the piano for the ship's passengers. He preferred playing the piano because the wireless work had become monotonous. On one of these trips, Luigi decided not to return to Italy.

In his Document of Request for Certificate of Arrival he declared that he had left Naples in September 1910 and landed in New York from the vessel Duca di Genova. His first American years, at least up to 1914 were spent in Rhode Island. There his first work was as a musician in the local theaters, focal points of entertainment for the Italian immigrant community, and he was Manager of the Compagnia Partenopea. In 1911, in Federal Hill, the Little Italy section of Providence, Rhode Island, Luigi met and married Lucia D’Ambra, a relative of the impresario of “La Sirena Theater”. Their relationship did not last long and in 1914 Luigi moved to Pittsburgh, Pennsylvania.

During the First World War, Luigi was leader of the 319th Regimental Band at Camp Lee, Virginia. There he composed music for the troops, including the much loved patriotic song “My Soldier Volunteer”, dedicated to the Homestead boys in Camp Lee.

In Stamford, Connecticut, where he went for a concerto, he met the beautiful soprano Maria Cozza, who he accompanied with his orchestra, and there his courtship began. In 1922 they married. Maria was a talented dramatic soprano with a full rich voice, effective in all registers. She was very proud that her family came from Waterbury, the same town as Rose Ponselle's. After the war he moved from Pennsylvania to Connecticut where he was resident up to 1937. After Luigi moved to New York (Bronx) where he lived up until his death on February 10, 1964.
