= The Young Werewolves =

American rock band

Background information
- Origin: Philadelphia, Pennsylvania
- Genres: Rockabilly; Psychobilly; Garage rock Surf rock Horror punk
- Years active: 2002–2015
- Members: Nick Falcon; Shewolf Dana Kain; Jonny Wolf
- Website: http://theyoungwerewolves.com/

The Young Werewolves are a Philadelphia rock band formed in 2002. The trio have been labeled rockabilly, psychobilly, punk, garage, and surf by publications such as Allmusic, Fangoria, The Village Voice, Maximum RocknRoll, assorted Horror, Tattoo, Hot Rod magazines, several alternative weeklies and international fanzines. The band is distributed through Cargo Music.

== History ==
The trio met after guitarist Nick Falcon posted ads on the internet and in music shops searching for "musicians interested in forming a band with a sound like The Ramones-meets-Buddy Holly at a Beef-and-Beer. All greasers please apply." Attracting attention from the underground press and steady airplay on specialty radio have enabled a frequent touring schedule.

In 2004, their music was licensed for broadcast on the fifteenth season of MTV's popular reality television series The Real World based in Philadelphia. AMC licensed music from the band for broadcast during the network's annual Monsterfest programming during Halloween season in 2007. In 2011, Showtime used The Young Werewolves’ music during an episode of Shameless starring William H. Macy. USA Network and Spike TV have also incorporated music from the band in Burn Notice and Blue Mountain State respectively.

Their second full-length recording, Cheat The Devil, was released in 2008. Sid Haig is the executive producer and is featured on the cover artwork. He also provides the introductory narration on the track Dr. Jeckyll and Mr. Hyde. Their third recording, Sins of The Past., was released in 2011 and included saxophones. In 2015 VH1 listed The Young Werewolves as a defining band within the Horror Rock genre.

== Discography ==
=== Albums ===
- The Young Werewolves
- Cheat The Devil
- Sins of the Past

=== Compilations ===
- CMJ ON AIR Vol. 006 (CMJ)
- This is Horror Punk Vol. 2 (Fiend Force Records)
- Pledge Your Allegiance... To Satan! (Necro-Tone Records)
- Ghouls Gone Wild (Poptown Records)
- Innocence is Bliss (Dionysus Records)
- Welcome to Circus Punk-A-Billy Vol. 2 (Wolverine Records)
- Continental Magazine No. 18 (Double Crown Records)
- Rockabilly & Psychobilly Madness | Psychobilly Goes Pop (Cleopatra Records)
