= Theodore L. Gargiulo =

Theodore Luigi Gargiulo (December 19, 1915 - December 11, 2006) was an American conductor, composer, and musicologist.

== Early life and education ==
Born in New York City, Taddeo Gargiulo was the son of immigrant parents Salvatore Gargiulo, a baker from Sorrento, and Erminia Mascia from Castellamare di Stabia, Italy. During the Great Depression, Theodore discovered his passion for the piano and found a way to begin his studies. His talent and pursuit led to a scholarship to the Manhattan School of Music. As he studied music theory and harmony, he was asked to join the National Youth Administration Symphony under the direction of Leopold Stokowski, where he expanded his knowledge of orchestration and composition.

In 1935, he received another scholarship from the New York Philharmonic Symphony Society and studied under a pupil of Rimsky-Korsakoff. He was asked to be a part of the Simeon Bellison Clarinet Ensemble, where he played bass clarinet. His concentration here continued to be harmony and composition. An original Romanza and his arrangement of Borodin’s On the Steps of Central Asia received a monetary prize and was performed by the ensemble at Town Hall on April 28, 1938 to standing ovations. He continued to do music in New York City and was writing, arranging and leading the Coro d’Italia to three gold cups at the 1939 New York World's Fair. According to one of New York’s newspapers, "Thirty-two nations joined hands in bringing colorful songs and dances of the old world to the world of tomorrow…The talent and grace of the young and old performers all costumed was something the huge crowd will never forget. The show lasted over seven hours.”

He also studied vocal arts at Teachers’ College of Columbia University. Maestro Fritz Stiedry of the Metropolitan Opera embraced him as his protégé. Here his passion grew deeper in the world of opera.

== Career ==
Sponsored by the City of New York, the Department of Parks, and local 802 A.F.M., Gargiulo conducted a series of outdoor summer concerts called “Live Music for Millions.”

Subsequent years found Maestro Gargiulo performing as Music Director, Assistant Conductor and Conductor with opera companies such as the Miami Opera Guild, Wagner Opera Company’s National Tour, New York Opera Festival in Washington, DC, Cafarelli Opera in Cleveland, the Brooklyn Academy of Music, the Columbus Symphony Orchestra in Columbus, Georgia, the Connecticut Opera Association, the Philadelphia Opera and the Cincinnati Summer Opera. As a member of the Sacred Musical Service in New York City he was a freelance choir master, organist and pianist.

Theodore’s last international conducting tour included the symphony orchestra of Ottawa, Vancouver and other cities in Canada. These orchestras provided accompaniment to the four hour silent film epic of the restoration of Abel Gance’s 1927 classic Napoleon produced by Francis Ford Coppola.

He was chief music critic, reviewer and feature writer for the Columbus Ledger-Enquirer newspapers for seven years and his articles appeared in many publications.

The Gargiulo family came to Monterey in 1972. He organized the Peninsula Clarinet Quartet for the Monterey Museum of Art and established the chamber concert series, "Music in the Museum." Colonel Moskowitz, and Theodore organized the Pan Cultural Orchestra of the Defense Language Institute (DLI). The orchestra performed concerts in Steinbeck Forum and throughout the community. With Specialist Bill Zornes, a student from the Russian Department, Theodore wrote a pageant to celebrate the Army’s 208th Birthday Ball, "Music – the Great Motivator." Interspersed with narration, the pageant revealed how music has inspired patriotism throughout history. It was described as a "spine thrilling performance."

In November 2001 Maestro Gargiulo received a lifetime achievement award at Lincoln Center for the Performing Arts in New York City. The award was presented by the Licia Albanese – Puccini Foundation.

Maestro Gargiulo was a prolific composer with a collection of art songs in various genres, symphonic works, chamber music, a wedding mass, and two operas. One of his last commissions was a popular romantic ballad titled Tehama Monterra Now and Forever and recorded on CD with a chamber orchestra. On August 30, 2006 Maestro Gargiulo composed his last composition, a musical setting of the Credo from the Catholic mass.

== Family ==
Theodore married Gloria Moschella in September 1959. They have two children, Franca Gargiulo and Terrence Gargiulo. Occhiata Productions (aka Occhiata Foundation) was founded by Franca and Terrence Gargiulo in honor of their father. The mission of Occhiata is to bring opera and music opportunities to underserved schools in Monterey County and surrounding Central Coast areas.
