= Jonathon Prandi =

American actor

- Born: August 11, 1972 (age 54) (United States) Kalamazoo, Michigan, U.S.
- Modeling information
- Height: 6 ft (1.8 m)

Jonathon Prandi (born August 11, 1972) is an American male fashion model, actor and IT-consultant. He was born in Kalamazoo, Michigan and grew up in Miami, Florida. Jonathon Prandi has been modeling for fashion shows, catalogs and magazines and has appeared in training videos and fitness- and training magazines such as Men's Health, Men's Workout, and Exercise for Men.

He has also appeared several times in Playgirl Magazine, the first time in February 1996. In the September 1996 issue he was their Centerfold, and in 1997 he was Playgirl Magazine's "Man of the Year."

He has appeared in TV shows like Guiding Light, Entertainment Tonight and Extra, and made guest appearances on Fox After Breakfast, Good Day New York, and The Montel Williams Show.

Prandi has also appeared on stage and in films; for example, he played the villain in the Off Broadway Play The Three Musketeers, and he also played himself in the independent film Three's A Crowd. He had a role in Deadly Ties as well as in the independent film Passion Fruits. Jonathon also was Pierce Brosnan's body double in the film The Thomas Crown Affair in 1999.

Prandi also holds a B.S. degree in information technology and an A.S. degree in computer information systems, and has in recent years started a successful web design company.

Prandi (sometimes referred to as Jonathan Prandi or "Sparkles") is 6 ft (1.8 m) tall and weighs 198 pounds (90 kg). According to his Playgirl interview, Jonathan is of Italian-American and Native-American ancestry.

== Filmography ==
- Little Shop of Erotica
- Guiding Light
- Entertainment Tonight
- Extra
- Fox After Breakfast
- Good Day New York
- The Montel Williams Show
- Three's A Crowd
- Deadly Ties
- Passion Fruits
- The Thomas Crown Affair

== Stage Appearances ==
- There's Something About Sparkles (performed Spring 2019)
