= Accountability =

Concept of responsibility in ethics, governance and decision-making

Accountability is a state of being often equated with answerability, culpability, liability, and the expectation of account-giving.

As in an aspect of governance, it has been central to discussions related to problems in the public sector, nonprofit, private (corporate), and individual contexts. In leadership roles, accountability is the acknowledgment of and assumption of responsibility for actions, products, decisions, and policies such as administration, governance, and implementation, including the obligation to report, justify, and be answerable for resulting consequences.

In governance, accountability has expanded beyond the basic definition of "being called to account for one's actions". It is frequently described as an account-giving relationship between individuals, e.g. "A is accountable to B when A is obliged to inform B about A's (past or future) actions and decisions, to justify them, and to suffer punishment in the case of eventual misconduct."

Accountability cannot exist without proper accounting practices; in other words, an absence of accounting means an absence of accountability. Another key area that contributes to accountability is good records management.

== History and etymology ==
The word accountability derives from the late Latin accomptare (to account), a prefixed form of computare (to calculate), which in turn is derived from putare (to reckon). While the word itself does not appear in English until its use in 13th century Norman England, the concept of account-giving has ancient roots in record-keeping activities related to governance and money-lending systems that first developed in Ancient Egypt, Israel, Babylon, Greece, and later Rome.

== Accountability modes ==
The scientific literature identifies several forms of accountability, which can be referred to as accountability modes. Examples of these modes include:

- administrative accountability,
- judicial accountability,
- market accountability,
- political accountability,
- professional accountability and
- social accountability.

== Administrative accountability ==
Administrative accountability refers to how public administrators monitor each other through various mechanisms. It includes:

- Program accountability, where different actors within the government demand responsibility for results.
- Hierarchical accountability, where superiors hold subordinates accountable for delegated duties. Administrative accountability involves both answerability, which aligns actions to principals' goals, and expectation management, where actors handle multiple stakeholder expectations.

== Political accountability ==
Political accountability is when a politician makes choices on behalf of the people, and the people have the ability to reward or sanction the politician. In representative democracies, citizens delegate power to elected officials through periodic elections, and such officials are empowered to represent or act in the citizens' interest. A challenge is how to see to it that those with such power, who presumably have divergent interests from the citizens, nonetheless act in their best interests. Citizens can rely on rewards or sanctions to reward or threaten politicians who might otherwise act in a manner that is antithetical to the people's interest. Accountability occurs when citizens only vote to re-elect representatives who act in their interests, and if representatives then select policies that will help them be re-elected. "Governments are 'accountable' if voters can discern whether governments are acting in their interest and sanction them appropriately, so that those incumbents who act in the best interest of the citizens win reelection and those who do not lose them."

Representatives can be held accountable through two mechanisms: electoral replacement and rational anticipation. In electoral replacement, citizens vote to replace representatives who are out of step with their interests. Rational anticipation requires that representatives anticipate the consequences of being out of step with their constituency and then govern in accordance with citizens' wishes to avoid negative consequences. Accountability can still be achieved even if citizens are not perfectly knowledgeable about their representatives' actions; as long as representatives believe that they will be held accountable by citizens, they will still be motivated to act in accordance with the citizens' interests.

=== Electoral accountability ===
Electoral accountability refers to citizens using their vote to sanction or reward politicians.

Some researchers have considered accountability using formal theory, which makes assumptions about the state of the world to draw larger conclusions. Voters can hold representatives accountable through the process of sanctioning—voting the incumbent out of office in response to poor performance. While politicians face a decrease in vote share as a result of poor performance, they are less likely to see an increase in vote share for good performance. Selection—voters choosing candidates based on who will best represent their interests—is another method by which voters hold their representatives accountable. These methods of accountability can occur simultaneously, with voters holding representatives accountable using both sanctioning and selection. These conclusions rely on the assumption that voters do not observe the policy implemented by the incumbent, but do know their own welfare.

Some factors make it harder for voters to sanction incumbents. When politicians do not have control over outcomes, it becomes harder to hold them accountable. Additionally, when organizations are unable to monitor elections and provide information to voters, then voters struggle to sanction the incumbent. When voters are better informed about the incumbent's performance, the incumbent is more vulnerable to voter sanctioning. Furthermore, when incumbents face sanctioning, challengers are more likely to enter the race.

While elections provide a mechanism which can theoretically increase government accountability to citizens, they may instead lead to less egalitarian policy outcomes, because those who hold the government accountable tend to be from wealthier segments of society. For example, a study of elected versus appointed property assessors in the state of New York shows that the election of property assessors leads to policies that severely undertax wealthier homes relative to poorer homes.

Studies on political accountability have emphasized the key role of elections in promoting accountability in democratic settings. It is through elections that citizens hold governments accountable for past performance.

==== Electoral manipulation ====
The role of elections in fostering accountability is often undermined by electoral manipulation and fraud. By preventing citizens from removing leaders through elections based on their performance in office, electoral manipulation breaks down accountability and may undercut the consolidation of democratic institutions.

Electoral manipulation is not rare; some estimates are that in the 1990s and 2000s, up to one fourth of elections suffered some form of substantial manipulation. This includes a large array of pre-election and election-day tactics, such as outlawing rival parties and candidates, employing violence and intimidation, and manipulating voter registration and vote count. Some efforts to improve accountability by preventing electoral manipulation and fraud have obtained a certain measure of success, such as using cell phone applications for monitoring and disseminating polling station results and employing domestic or international election observers. However, governments may simply alter the type of manipulation or where it occurs in order to deceive observers and monitoring agencies.

Governments, politicians, and political parties are more likely to resort to electoral manipulation and fraud when they believe they might be removed from office and when they face few institutional constraints to their power. Low political competition has also been linked to some forms of manipulation, such as abolishing presidential term limits. Well-connected candidates are more likely to resort to vote count fraud. Governments may engage in electoral manipulation not only to obtain victory at a given election or to remain in office longer, but also for post-election reasons, such as reducing the strength of the opposition or increasing their own bargaining power in the subsequent period.

=== Administrative ===
==== Common goods ====
Politicians may be incentivized to provide common goods as a means of accountability. The ability of voters to attribute the credit and blame of outcomes also determines the extent of public goods provision. Research suggests that public goods provision is conditional on being able to attribute outcomes to politicians as opposed to civil servants. This attribution can be enhanced by more short-run and visible inputs and outcomes such as famine relief or access to drinking water, whereas lower-visibility issues such as sanitation and education may be more difficult to attribute credit for and thus less likely to provide for.

Another condition determining how voters use the provision of public goods to hold leaders accountable is whether the prioritization of public goods is determined either directly via vote or delegated to a governing body. An experiment in New Mexico regarding proposed spending during the state's 2008 special summer legislative session provides evidence that legislators update their positions when learning about voters' policy preferences, indicating that a representative democracy can increase accountability when politicians learn about voters' preferences. A 2016 experiment in Afghanistan regarding rural development projects, however, finds that when voters directly prioritize their preferences at the ballot box, they perceive the quality of local government to be higher than when a governing committee prioritizes development projects. These contrasting outcomes highlight a debate between trustees and delegates, though the lack of objective superior outcomes in projects decided by vote as opposed to committee in the Afghanistan experiment indicate neither is superior to the other in determining which public goods should be given priority.

Other research indicates that voters use elections to hold politicians accountable for the provision of public goods. In India, rural areas are charged a flat rate for electricity, but in the province of Uttar Pradesh, line loss—electricity that is consumed but not billed—is significantly higher in election years than non-election years, and increases in line loss reliably predict electoral gains. Voters rewarded incumbent politicians with a 12% increase in party seats in response to a 10% increase of unbilled electricity, in 2007 elections. In Ghana, the improvement of road conditions is linked to an increasing vote share for incumbent parties. Both of these research outcomes hinge on voters being able to attribute the service of public goods to politicians.

Politicians may also have incentives to respond to pressure for public goods provision in electoral autocracies. There is evidence that as autocratic governments lose seats in their party's legislatures, they respond by increasing spending on public goods such as education, healthcare, and pensions. There is further evidence suggesting higher quality of life, civil liberties, and human development in electoral autocracies, lending credence to the theory that autocratic rulers use elections as a bellwether against popular discontent and citizen opposition, and in turn increase public goods provision to dampen the grievances of disgruntled citizens, even in non-democracies.

While the introduction of elections is generally thought to improve public goods provision, in some cases, researchers have shown that it may reduce its quality. For example, the introduction of direct elections for local district office in Indonesia resulted in political interference in the hiring process for bureaucrats in the public education sector, reducing the quality of education provision; politicians were incentivized to dole out patronage positions in the education sector, especially in election years, and where such positions were added, student test scores were lower.

== Non-electoral ==
Governments are held accountable if citizens can punish or reward the government to influence it to pursue their best interests. While scholars who study democratic theory emphasize the role of elections in ensuring accountability, another strand of scholars investigates non-electoral forms of accountability in democracies and non-democracies and the conditions that make unelected leaders represent the interests of the general public.

=== Political protests ===
Political changes after protests can be the result of the protests per se, or symptoms of shifts in political preferences underneath the observable phenomena of the protests. One study of the Tea Party movement in the United States has shown that protests per se have an impact on political change.

Other scholars studied the effect of protests on political changes in developing countries. Mass protests instigated by economic hardship and political repression occurred in 16 sub-Saharan African countries, and 21 governments in the region implemented significant political reforms, such as the adoption of multi-party elections. Authoritarian regimes in Africa distorted the market and reduced the cost of farm produce in favor of urban workers at the cost of rural farmers in the 1980s to prevent urban unrest, which is more visible and easier to mobilize than rural protests.

=== Selectorates ===
Belsky et al. point out that whereas, under more democratic governance, accountability is built into the institution of the state by a habit of regular elections, accountability in autocratic regimes relies on a selectorate—a group that legitimizes or delegitimizes the autocrat's powers according to selectorate theory. Selectorates are those on whom a leader depends in order to hold onto power, and those who have the ability to depose a leader. When a selectorate's hold on power is not overly dependent on the leader in office, selectorates can remove poorly performing leaders, and this accountability by selectorates renders it possible for autocracies to perform better for the benefit of all. Beyond that, institutions can act as credible restraints on autocracy as well.

=== Civil societies ===
In democracies, voluntary associations, interest groups, and associational activity can improve the performance of the government. One study showed that civil society organizations such as NGOs can increase the performance of local government according to the central government's standards by monitoring and disclosing information about local government performance in authoritarian regimes like China. Solidarity groups in rural China, in which members share moral obligations and interests, can hold local officials accountable as well when (i) the solidarity group encompasses everyone under the local government's jurisdiction, and (ii) local officials are embedded in the group as members. The social standing and recognition of these groups encourages local officials to perform well, as they value high moral standing in the group.

At the local level, various accountability measures exist that impact the job performance of elected officials. In Uganda, civil society organizations (CSOs) that divulge to the public how well an incumbent is performing their job duties, in a district with an upcoming competitive election, increase the performance of the politician for the rest of their term. In contrast to these works, a meta-analysis released in 2019 uncovers no effects from CSO voter information campaigns on political accountability after examining the results from seven trials across six countries. In Ghana, election-day monitoring of polling centers for district-level positions, as well as an increase in the awareness of monitoring in an upcoming election, increases job performance among incumbents, who spend more of their annual Constituency Development Fund allocations from the central government on public goods for the electorate. In locales with weaker institutions, when citizens elect leaders with higher levels of competency, these officials have a greater ability to overcome the barriers of bad informal institutions, and deliver more goods and long-term investment projects for the constituency without needing to raise taxes. Additionally, many local elections are for positions that involve performing jobs with a single function, such as a school board member or a sheriff. These elected officials are held accountable to their positions mainly through information provided to the public through the media. When the media focuses attention on data trends associated with these positions, constituents are then able to use this information to retrospectively vote for or against an incumbent based on their performance in office.

=== Public opinion polls ===
Approval ratings generated through public opinion polling create a measure of job performance during an incumbent's term that has implications for whether the official will retain their seat, or if reelection will even be sought. These approval ratings predict election outcomes when combined with other factors included in Bayesian Model Averaging forecasts. In the United States, senator job approval ratings affect whether a senator will retire, the quality of candidates that seek to challenge them, the amount of money the senator can raise to seek reelection if they decide to run, and the outcome of the election itself. Strategic incumbent senators will seek reelection less when their approval ratings are low during their time in office.

=== Shared interests ===
Traditional leaders in Zambia provide local public goods despite the fact that they lack an electoral incentive to do so. Many customary chiefs never leave the communities they lead and depend on local sources for a significant portion of their income; thus, traditional leaders may facilitate bringing in local public goods and benefit from the community's development over time just like stationary bandits in Olson's argument.

== Accountability and corruption ==
Political corruption refers to "the misuse or the abuse of public office for private gains". Corrupt practices include fraud, appropriation of public funds, and accepting bribes. Corruption can cause people to negatively evaluate politicians, since citizens may perceive corruption as a signal of poor performance, motivating them to sanction an incumbent. As the model of retrospective voting suggests that voters incentivize good politicians' behavior by rewarding good performance and punishing bad performance, citizens are expected to sanction corrupt politicians. However, studies suggest that though voters have a distaste for corruption, they often fail to punish corrupt incumbents; some of them receive benefits from their representatives' corrupt practices, and prefer to retain this type of politician. In high-corruption contexts, voters may become more tolerant of or even prefer corrupt politicians because others are also perceived as corrupt, leading to a corrupt equilibrium "where voters are generally willing to retain corrupt politicians", referred to as a "political corruption trap". This high corruption equilibrium is difficult to break due to interaction between corrupt politicians, voters who tolerate and retain corrupt politicians, and potential entrants or challengers who also engage in corrupt practices, leading to the maintenance of corruption. Economic development is associated with a decrease in corruption. Freedom of the press contributes to the reduction of corruption by exposing corrupt actions. Documentation on how a corrupt government (e.g. Alberto Fujimori's government from 1998 to 2000 in Peru) can strategically undermine checks-and-balances institutions, suggests that the news media—i.e. newspapers and mainly television—is crucial to the dissemination of information to the public. There is also evidence about the importance of local media, such as local radio stations, in holding corrupt incumbents accountable and in promoting non-corrupt politicians. Information about corruption may not only lead to vote losses for the incumbent parties, but also for challenging parties, as well the erosion of partisan attachments, which implies that information about corruption also provokes citizens' disengagement from the political process.

Scholarly literature about corruption finds mixed results about the role of political institutions on the level of a country's corruption. For example, some scholarly research suggests that more horizontal accountability, or oversight across branches of government, would generally decrease corruption. However, other research shows that increased oversight could increase corruption when actors in one branch can pressure actors in another to collude; in Ghana, bureaucrats are more likely to engage in corruption on behalf of politicians when politicians have higher levels of discretion to oversee the bureaucracy (e.g., by threatening to transfer noncompliant bureaucrats).

Low accountability for corruption is difficult to combat, and some anti-corruption activities may also lead to perverse consequences. For example, in places where private sector work pays better than public sector work (e.g., China), highly qualified individuals engaging in public sector work may only find such work attractive because it allows for further compensation through corrupt activities. Government anti-corruption activities can therefore decrease the quality and overall representativeness of the bureaucracy as a result. On the other hand, there is evidence that, despite strategic evasion and unintentional consequences, anti-corruption initiatives are beneficial, as they lower malfeasance and increase social welfare, even where strategic evasion is relatively large.

== Police accountability ==
Police accountability involves holding both individual police officers and law enforcement agencies responsible for effectively delivering basic crime control services and maintaining order, while treating individuals fairly and within the bounds of the law. Police are expected to uphold laws, regarding due process, search and seizure, arrests, discrimination, as well as other laws relating to equal employment, sexual harassment, etc. Holding police accountable is important for maintaining the public's "faith in the system". Research has shown that the public prefers independent review of complaints against law enforcement, rather than relying on police departments to conduct internal investigations. Public perception of police accountability can be partisan. Electoral accountability can improve police accountability of asset forfeiture.

== Organizational ==
=== Ethical ===
Within an organization, the principles and practices of ethical accountability aim to improve both the internal standard of individual and group conduct as well as external factors, such as sustainable economic and ecologic strategies. Also, ethical accountability plays an important role in academic fields, such as laboratory experiments and field research. Debates around the practice of ethical accountability on the part of researchers in the social field – whether professional or others – were explored by Norma R.A. Romm in her work on Accountability in Social Research, and elsewhere. Researcher accountability implies that researchers are cognizant of, and take some responsibility for, the potential impact of their ways of doing research – and of writing it up – on the social fields of which the research is part. Accountability is linked to considering carefully, and being open to challenge in relation to, one's choices concerning how research agendas are framed and the styles in which research results are written.

=== Security ===
The traceability of actions performed on a system to a specific system entity (user, process, device) also affects accountability. For example, the use of unique user identification and authentication supports accountability, and the use of shared user IDs and passwords degrades accountability.

=== Individuals within organizations ===
Because many individuals in large organizations contribute in many ways to decisions and policies, it is difficult even in principle to identify who should be accountable for the results. This is what is known, following Dennis F. Thompson, as "the problem of many hands". It creates a dilemma for accountability. If individuals are held accountable or responsible, individuals who could not have prevented the results are either unfairly punished, or they "take responsibility" in a symbolic ritual without suffering any consequences. If only organizations are held accountable, then all individuals in the organization are equally blameworthy or all are excused.

Various solutions have been proposed. One is to broaden the criteria for individual responsibility so that individuals are held accountable for not anticipating failures in the organization. Another solution, recently proposed by Thompson, is to hold individuals accountable for the design of the organization, both retrospectively and prospectively.

Accountability is an element of a responsibility assignment matrix which indicates who is ultimately answerable for the correct and thorough completion of a deliverable or task, as well as the delegation of the work to those responsible.

=== Public and private overlap ===
With the increase in public service provided by private entities, especially in Britain and the United States, some have called for increased political accountability mechanisms for otherwise non-political entities. Legal scholar Anne Davies, for instance, argues that the line between public institutions and private entities like corporations is becoming blurred in certain areas of public service in the United Kingdom, and that this can compromise political accountability in those areas. She and others argue that some administrative law reform is necessary to address this accountability gap.

With respect to the public/private overlap in the United States, public concern over the contracting of government services (including military) and the resulting accountability gap was highlighted following the Nisour Square massacre perpetrated by the Blackwater security firm in Iraq.

== In education ==
As defined by National Council on Measurement in Education (NCME), accountability is "[a] program, often legislated, that attributes the responsibility for student learning to teachers, school administrators, or students. Test results typically are used to judge accountability, and often consequences are imposed for shortcomings."

Student accountability is traditionally based on school and classroom rules, combined with sanctions for infringement.

In contrast, some educational establishments such as Sudbury schools believe that students are personally responsible for their acts, and that traditional schools do not permit students to choose their course of action fully; they do not permit students to embark on the course, once chosen; and they do not permit students to suffer the consequences of the course, once taken. Freedom of choice, freedom of action, freedom to bear the results of action are considered the three great freedoms that constitute personal responsibility. Sudbury schools claim that "'Ethics' is a course taught by life experience". They adduce that the essential ingredient for acquiring values—and for moral action—is personal responsibility, that schools will become involved in the teaching of morals when they become communities of people who fully respect each other's right to make choices, and that the only way the schools can become meaningful purveyors of ethical values is if they provide students and adults with real-life experiences that are bearers of moral import. Students are given complete responsibility for their own education and the school is run by a direct democracy in which students and staff are equals.

== Media and accountability ==
Econometric research has found that countries with greater press freedom tend to have less corruption. Greater political accountability and lower corruption were more likely where newspaper consumption was higher, according to data from roughly 100 countries and from different states in the US. Congressmen who receive less press coverage are less likely to produce a positive impact for their constituencies, are less likely to stand witness before congressional hearings, and federal spending for their district is lower. One explanation for the positive impact of media on accountability stems from Besley and Burgess' work. They argue that media resolves the information asymmetries between citizens and government and provides a way of overcoming obstacles preventing political action. When elected officials and the public gain information, the public is better equipped to hold politicians accountable and politicians are more responsive. Ferraz & Finan demonstrate this in the Brazilian context. In their work, they find releasing audit reports prior to elections creates a more informed electorate which holds incumbent officials accountable.

While evidence supports the positive impact of press freedom on political accountability, other work highlights the risk of media capture through factors such as media concentration and ownership as government tools for influencing or controlling news content. Non-democratic regimes use media for a variety of purposes such as – (i) to enhance regime resilience, (ii) censor, or (iii) strategically distract the public. Control of the media may also be especially beneficial to incumbents in new or developing democracies, who consider media control a spoil of office.

An analysis of the evolution of mass media in the U.S. and Europe since World War II noted mixed results from the growth of the Internet: "The digital revolution has been good for freedom of expression [and] information [but] has had mixed effects on freedom of the press": It has disrupted traditional sources of funding, and new forms of Internet journalism have replaced only a tiny fraction of what's been lost. Various systems have been proposed for increasing the funds available for investigative journalism that allow individual citizens to direct small amounts of government funds to news outlets or investigative journalism projects of their choice.

== Standards ==
Accountability standards have been established that organizations can voluntarily commit to. Standards apply in particular to the non-profit world and to Corporate Social Responsibility initiatives. Accountability standards include the:

INGO Accountability Charter
signed by a large number of NGOs to "demonstrate their commitment to accountability and transparency"
AccountAbility's AA1000 series
"principles-based standards to help organisations become more accountable, responsible and sustainable. They address issues affecting governance, business models and organizational strategy, as well as providing operational guidance on sustainability assurance and stakeholder engagement"
Humanitarian Accountability Partnership 2010 standards
for humanitarian organizations to help them "design, implement, assess, improve and recognize accountable programmes"

In addition, some non-profit organizations set up their own commitments to accountability:

Accountability, Learning and Planning System (ALPS) by ActionAid
a framework that sets out key accountability requirements, guidelines, and processes

== See also ==
- Accountability partner – Person who helps another to keep a commitment
- Accountability software – Type of surveillance software
- Accountability for reasonableness – Ethical framework for decision making
- Campaign finance reform in the United States – Efforts to regulate election campaign fundraising
- Committee on Standards in Public Life – UK ethical standards advisory body
- Euthenics – Study of improving living conditions to increase well-being
- Exit, Voice, and Loyalty – Book on economic and political theory
- Exit, Voice, and Loyalty Model – Framework for modelling political and economic behavior
- Freedom of information laws by country – Legal frameworks for the right to know
- Good governance – Performing public services competently for the benefit of all citizens
- Government Accountability Office – US federal government agency
- Moral responsibility – Concept in ethics
- One World Trust – Global trust
- Open government – Practice of sharing state documents and proceedings publicly and reusably
- Right to be forgotten – Legal concept
- Security sector governance and reform – Process in international development
- Special district (United States) – Independent special-purpose governmental units, other than school districts
- Supreme audit institution – Independent governmental audit agencies
- Transparency International – International non-governmental organization
- Worldwide Governance Indicators – Measurement of quality of governance
- World Bank's Inspection Panel
