= Cost overrun =

Unexpected incurred costs in excess of budgeted amounts

A cost overrun, also known as a cost increase or budget overrun, involves unexpected incurred costs. When these costs are in excess of budgeted amounts due to a value engineering underestimation of the actual cost during budgeting, they are known by these terms.

Cost overruns are common in infrastructure, building, and technology projects. For IT projects, a 2004 industry study by the Standish Group found an average cost overrun of 43 percent; 71 percent of projects came in over budget, exceeded time estimates, and had estimated too narrow a scope; and total waste was estimated at $55 billion per year in the US alone. Other studies concluded that costs for it projects are overrun by an average of 33 to 34 percent.

Many major construction projects have incurred cost overruns; cost estimates used to decide whether important transportation infrastructure should be built can mislead grossly and systematically.

Cost overrun is distinguished from cost escalation, which is an anticipated growth in a budgeted cost due to factors such as inflation.

== Causes ==
A 2014 essay by Dominic Ahiaga-Dagbui and Simon Smith suggests an alternative to what is traditionally seen as an overrun in the construction field. They attempt to make a distinction between the often conflated causes of construction cost underestimation and eventual cost overruns. Critical to their argument is the point of reference for measuring cost overruns. Whereas some measure the size of cost overruns as the difference between cost at the time of decision to build and final completion costs, others measure the size of overruns as the difference between cost at contract award and final completion cost. This leads to a wide range in the size of overruns reported in different studies.

Four types of explanation for cost overrun exist: technical, psychological, political-economic, value engineering. Technical explanations account for cost overrun in terms of imperfect forecasting techniques, inadequate data, etc. Psychological explanations account for overrun in terms of optimism bias with forecasters. Scope creep, where the requirements or targets rises during the project, is common. Finally, political-economic explanations see overrun as the result of strategic misrepresentation of scope or budgets. Historically, political explanations for cost overrun have been seen to be the most dominant. In the USA, the architectural firm Home Architects has attributed this to a human trait they call "Psychology of Construction Cost Denial", regarding the cost inflation of custom homes.

A less explored possible cause of cost overruns on construction project is the escalation of commitment to a course of action. This theory, grounded in social psychology and organisation behaviour, suggests the tendency of people and organisations to become locked-in and entrapped in a particular course of action and thereby 'throw good money after bad' to make the venture succeed. This defies conventional rationality behind subjective expected utility theory. Ahiaga-Dagbui and Smith explore the effects of escalation of commitment on project delivery in construction using the case of the Scottish Parliament project. Also, a recent study has suggested that principles of chaos theory can be employed to understand how cost overruns emerge in megaprojects. This paper seeks to reclassify megaprojects as chaotic systems that are nonlinear and therefore difficult to predict. Using cases of cost overruns in oil and gas megaprojects, this study makes strong argument that chaos theory can indeed be a silver bullet in finding solutions to the recurring problem of cost overruns in megaprojects.

A newly discovered possible cause of cost overruns is value engineering, and an approach to correct value engineering cost overruns known as value-driven-design.

== Prevention and mitigation ==
In response to problem of cost overruns on major projects, the UK Government set up a Major Projects Authority to provide project assurance to HM Treasury and other Government departments undertaking major projects. Independent review of the financial effectiveness of project assurance in reducing cost overruns found the project assurance process to be effective in reducing cost overruns and recommended an expansion of the process to cover most of the Government's project portfolio. Project assurance is now also being used by private sector companies undertaking major projects.

== Describing ==
Cost overrun can be described in multiple ways.

- As a percentage of the total expenditure
- As a total percentage including and above the original budget
- As a percentage of the cost overruns to original budget

For example, consider a bridge with a construction budget of $100 million where the actual cost was $150 million. This scenario could be truthfully represented by the following statement

- The cost overruns constituted 33% of the total expense.
- The budget for the bridge increased to 150%.
- The cost overruns exceeded the original budget by 50%.

The final example is the most commonly used as it specifically describes the cost overruns exclusively whereas the other two describe the overrun as an aspect of the total expense. In any case care should be taken to accurately describe what is meant by the chosen percentage so as to avoid ambiguity.

== List of projects with large cost overruns ==
=== Australia ===
- Sydney Opera House was completed ten years late and more than fourteen times over budget.

=== Canada ===
- Canadian Firearms Registry, initially projected to cost Canadian taxpayers $CAN 2 million, ended up being 1,000 times over budget at $CAN 2 billion
- Trans Mountain pipeline expansion comes in 70 per cent higher than expected. Trans Mountain Corporation announced the projected cost of the pipeline expansion has soared from its earlier estimate of $12.6 billion to $21.4 billion.

=== Finland ===
- Olkiluoto Nuclear Power Plant Unit 3: 3 billion euro → 8.5 billion euro (as of 2017, project still ongoing)
- Helsinki Western Metro Extension: 400 million euro → 1.19 billion euro (September 2017)

=== Germany ===
- Berlin Brandenburg Airport: 1 billion euro → 6 billion euro
- Elbe Philharmonic Hall in Hamburg: 77 million euro → 789 million euro
- Landesarchiv Nordrhein-Westfalen in Duisburg: 30 million euro → 195 million euro
- Staatsoper Unter den Linden: 240 million euro → 400 million euro

=== Russia ===
- 2014 Winter Olympics in Sochi: US$12 billion → US$51 billion
- Krestovsky Stadium in St Petersburg = 548%

=== United Kingdom ===
- The NHS patient records system, implemented as part of the National Programme for IT, was originally estimated to cost £6.4bn and eventually abandoned before completion after £10bn were spent. It was described as "one of the worst and most expensive contracting fiascos in the history of the public sector".
- Scottish Parliament Building, originally "expected to take two years and cost £40 million" but "took five years and cost £400 million".
- Edinburgh Trams

=== United States ===
- The Big Dig, a multi-billion dollar highway reconstruction in Boston, was delivered nine years late with a cost overrun of 190% adjusted for inflation.
- The Boeing Dreamliner programme, announced in 2003, was supposed to cost $6 billion and see the plane take to the air in 2008. The final bill was closer to $32 billion; and the plane arrived three years late.

== See also ==
- Admissible heuristic – Computer science pathfinding concept
- Benefit shortfall – When the actual benefits of a venture are less than the projected or estimated benefits
- Downside risk – Risk of the actual return being below the expected return
- Efficient contract theory – Hypothesis in microeconomics
- Escalation of commitment – Human behavior pattern in which the participant takes on increasing risk
- Hiding hand principle – How ignorance intersects with rational choice to undertake a project
- Megaproject – Extremely large-scale construction and investment project
- Optimism bias – Type of cognitive bias
- Planning fallacy – Cognitive bias of underestimating time needed
- Reference class forecasting – Method of predicting the future
- Scope creep – Project management issue
