= Benefit shortfall =

When the actual benefits of a venture are less than the projected or estimated benefits

When the actual benefits of a venture are less than the projected or estimated benefits, the result is known as a benefit shortfall.

If, for instance, a company is launching a new product or service and projected sales are 40 million dollars per year, whereas actual annual sales turn out to be only 30 million dollars, then the benefit shortfall is said to be 25 percent. Sometimes the terms "demand shortfall" or "revenue shortfall" are used instead of benefit shortfall; see volume risk.

Public and private enterprises alike fall victim to benefit shortfalls. Prudent planning of new ventures will include the risk of benefit shortfalls in risk assessment and risk management.

The discipline of benefits realisation management seeks to identify any benefits shortfall as early as possible in a project or programmes delivery in order to allow corrective action to be taken, costs to be controlled and benefits realised.

== Causes ==
Benefit shortfalls may arise from systematic forecasting errors, unexpected market developments, or strategic misrepresentation during project appraisal. Economic research has identified optimism bias—where planners systematically overestimate benefits and underestimate risks—as a common cause of discrepancies between projected and actual outcomes.

Changes in demand conditions, technological developments, regulatory environments, or competitive responses may also reduce realized benefits relative to projections. In some cases, incentive structures during project approval stages may encourage overstatement of expected returns in order to secure funding or political support.

== See also ==
- Boondoggle – A project continued despite awareness of a benefit shortfall
- Cost overrun – Unexpected incurred costs in excess of budgeted amounts
- Cost-benefit analysis – Systematic approach to estimating the strengths and weaknesses of alternatives
- Downside risk – Risk of the actual return being below the expected return
- Efficient contract theory – Hypothesis in microeconomics
- Hiding hand principle – How ignorance intersects with rational choice to undertake a project
- Optimism bias – Type of cognitive bias
- Planning fallacy – Cognitive bias of underestimating time needed
- Reference class forecasting – Method of predicting the future
- Underconsumption – Economic stagnation from inadequate consumer demand
