= Kenjeran Bridge =

Bridge in Surabaya, Indonesia

Suroboyo Bridge Kenjeran Bridge Jembatan Kenjeran
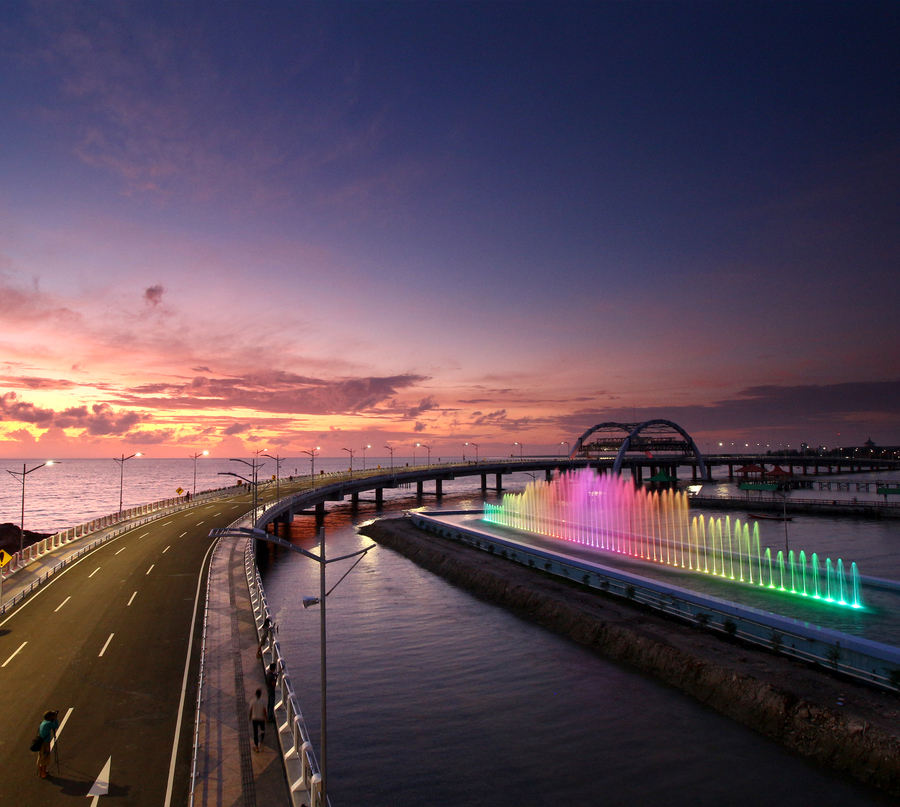
- Kenjeran Bridge with illuminated fountain at dawn
- Coordinates: 7.237073°S 112.796956°E
- Carries: Vehicles
- Crosses: Eastern Coastal of Surabaya and Madura Strait
- Locale: East Java (Surabaya)
- Official name: Suroboyo Bridge

Characteristics
- Design: Through arch bridge
- Total length: 800 meters (2,625 ft)
- Width: 18 meters (59 ft)
- Clearance below: 12 meters (39.4 ft)

History
- Designer: Tri Rismaharini
- Contracted lead designer: PT Hutama Karya
- Construction start: 20 January 2015; 11 years ago
- Construction end: 20 June 2016; 10 years ago
- Opened: 9 July 2016; 10 years ago

Location
- Interactive map of Suroboyo Bridge; Kenjeran Bridge

Suroboyo Bridge commonly known as Kenjeran Bridge is a through arch bridge across the coastal area of Eastern Surabaya in Kenjeran Beach, District Kenjeran, Surabaya, East Java, Indonesia. This bridge has a length of 800 meters with a width of 18 meters and a height of 12 meters which is held with 150 stakes. The design of the bridge is built in a circle with a view of the fountain in the center of the bridge.

== History ==
=== Construction ===
The construction of the bridge began in January 2015 and was built by PT Hutama Karya, an Indonesian state-owned construction company. The bridge was built from the Kenjeran Beach Amusement Park (THP), part of the Eastern Surabaya Outer Ring-road project, across to the Bulak Fisheries Center (SIB) area and fishing settlements in Nambangan, Kedung Cowek.

=== Opening ===
The bridge was inaugurated on 9 July 2016, which was marked by the release of hundreds of fireworks and lanterns by the Mayor of Surabaya after pressing the button to sign the inauguration of the Suroboyo Bridge.

== Critics ==
The bridge project was criticized by members of the Surabaya city council because it was assessed without good planning. An economic lecturer from Airlangga University, Nisful Laila, believes that the Kenjeran bridge is inefficient. Sepuluh Nopember Institute of Technology's urban planning expert Putu Rudy Setiawan added that the construction of the Kenjeran Bridge was lacking in planning. At the time, the Head of the Public Works and Public Works Office of the Surabaya City Highways and Eradication Office, Erna Purnawati, denied various arguments that the Kenjeran Bridge was built to advance the tourism sector in Surabaya.

== Gallery ==
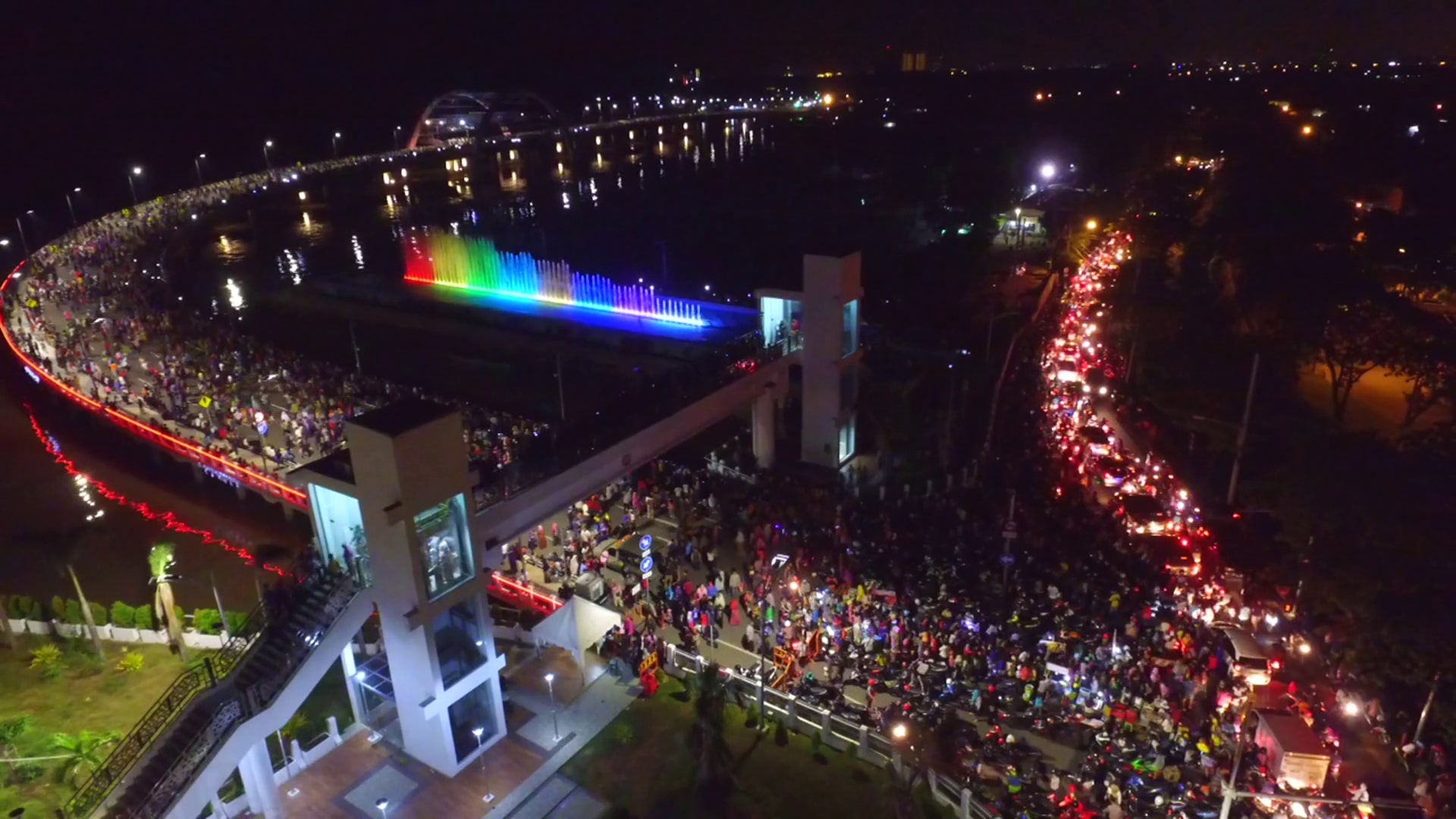

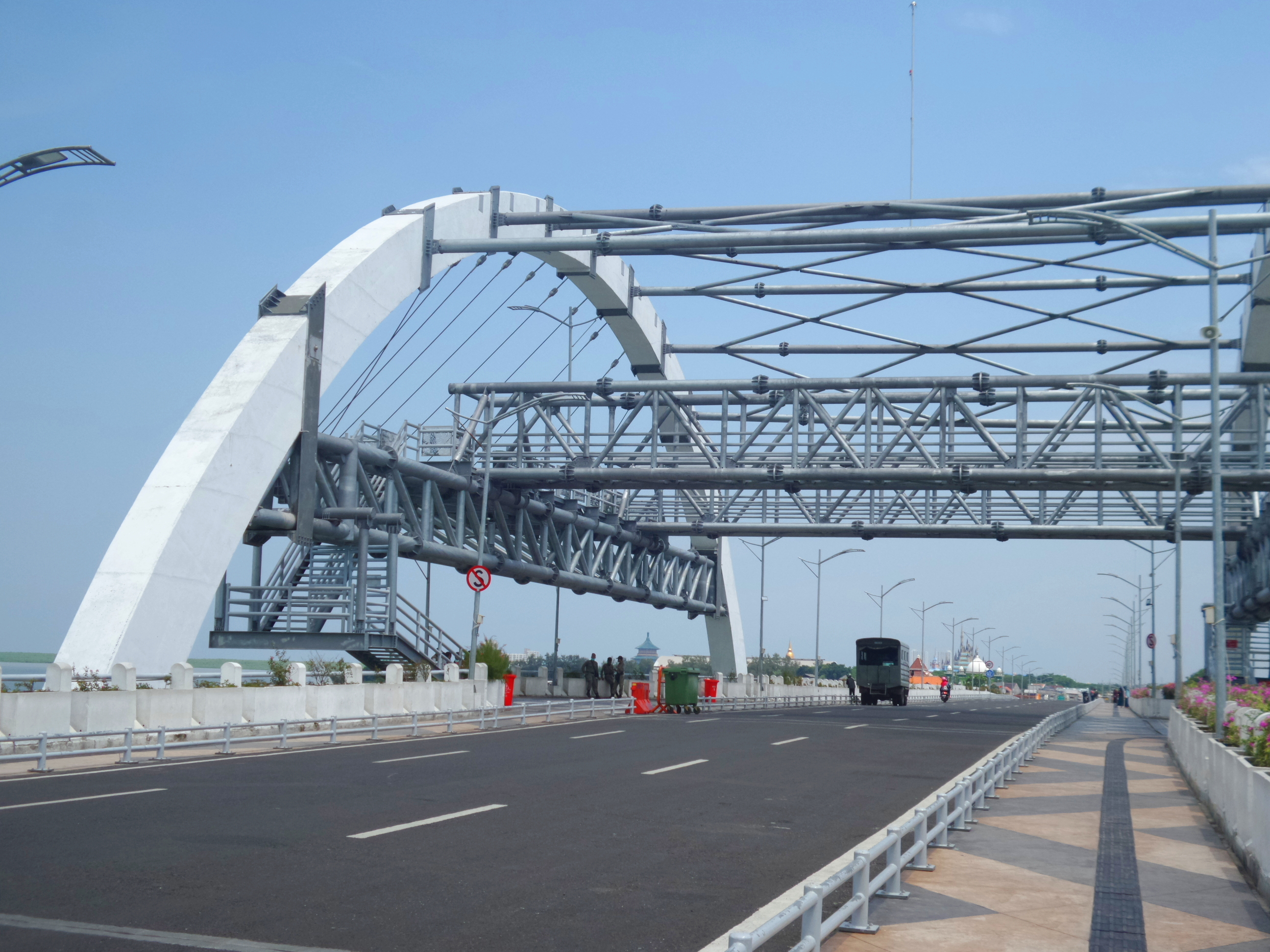

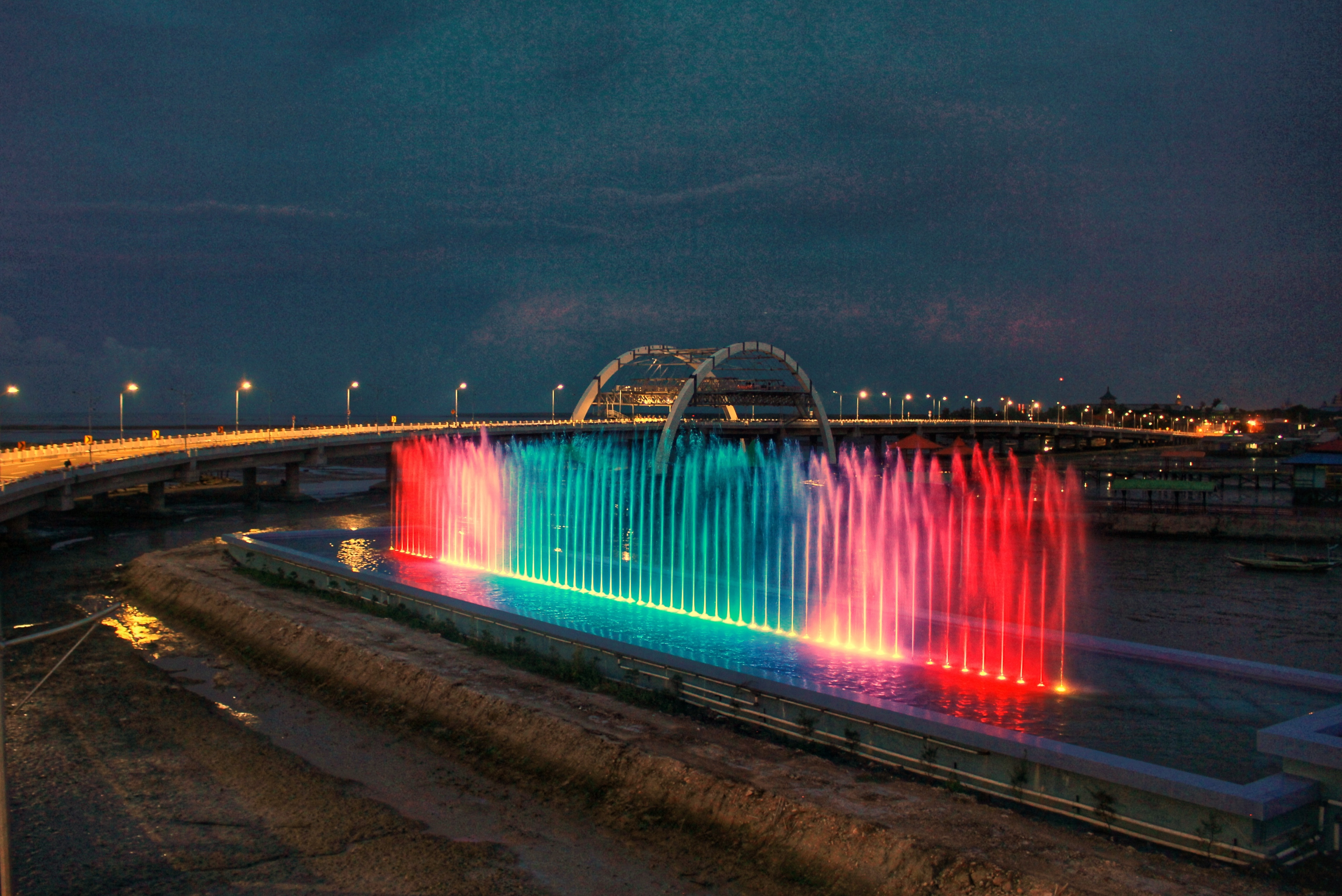

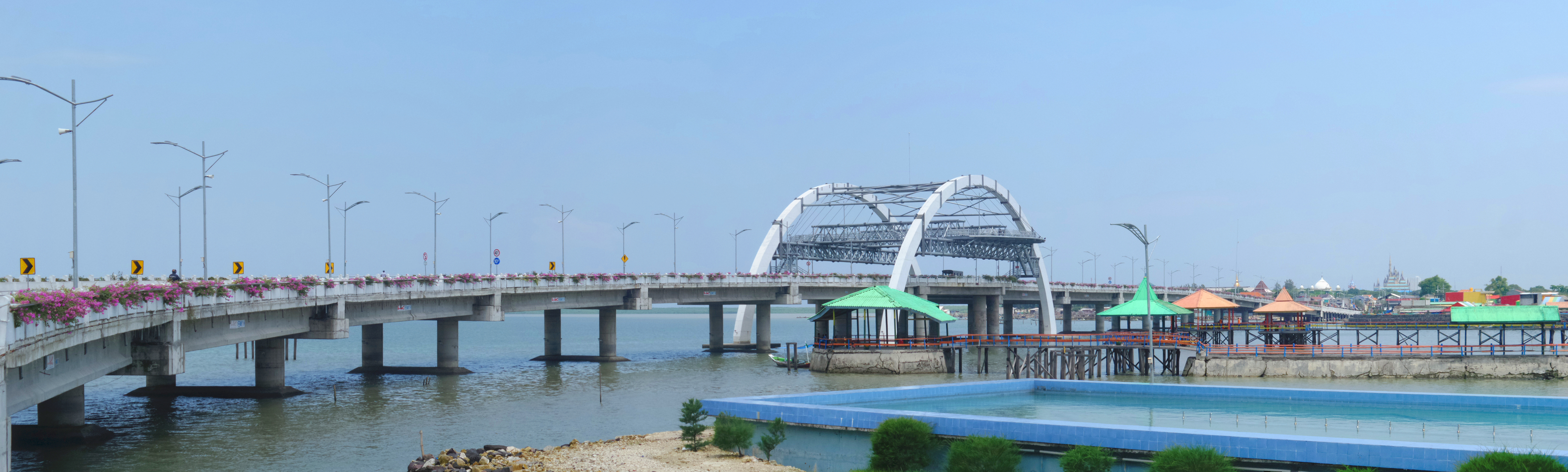

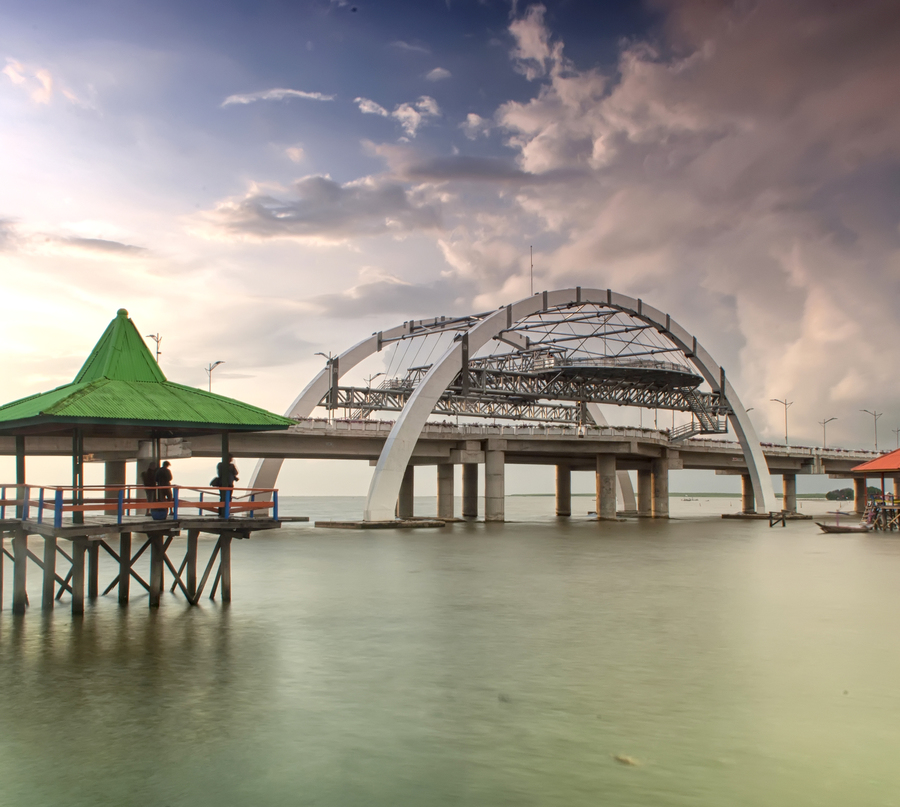

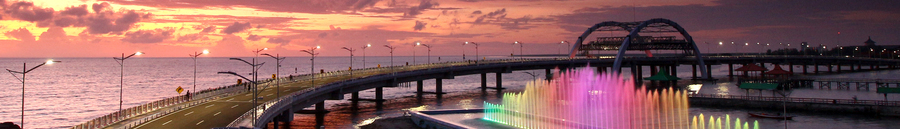

== See also ==
- Arch bridge
- Through arch bridge
- List of bridges
