= Hirschman cycle =

First mentioned by economist Albert O. Hirschman in his 1982 book Shifting Involvements the Hirschman cycle attempts to describe cycles in American political power. Simply put, the Hirschman cycle states that since the Industrial Revolution American society has regularly shifted between focus on private interest and public action. One example occurred in the 1960s when newly affluent Americans perhaps became dissatisfied with acquisition of goods and turned to political action.
