= Benefits realisation management =

Benefits realization management (BRM), also benefits management, benefits realisation or project benefits management, is a project management methodology, often visual, addressing how time and resources are invested into making desirable changes. BRM is used to manage the investment by organizations in procurement, projects, programmes and portfolios, and has been shown to increase project success across different countries and industries. (Note: Although the Project Management Institute (PMI) identified that only one in five organizations report high maturity in benefits realization.)

The popularity of BRM began in 1995 in the UK, when Scottish Widows created a Benefits Realisation Management method as part of its Project Management Handbook , (then titled Benefits Realisation), and rolled its use out across the entire firm. It grew in the UK with the inclusion of BRM by the UK Government in their standardized approach to programmes, Managing Successful Programmes (MSP).

== Definitions ==
Benefits realization management has four main definitions.

The first definition is to consider benefits management as an organisational change process. It is defined as "the process of organizing and managing, such that the potential benefits arising from the use of IT are actually realized".

The second definition perceives it as a process. Benefits management is defined by the Association for Project Management (APM) as the identification, definition, planning, tracking and realization of business benefits.

The third definition is to apply this concept on project management level. Project benefits management is defined as "the initiating, planning, organizing, executing, controlling, transitioning and supporting of change in the organisation and its consequences as incurred by project management mechanisms to realize predefined project benefits".

Finally, benefits realization management is perceived as a set of processes structured to "close the gap" between strategy planning and execution by ensuring the implementation of the most valuable initiatives.

== Process ==
BRM process
- Identify the investment outcomes
- Define benefit measures for each outcome
- Collect current benefit measure data to have a quantitative basis for decision making
- Agree to a tailored BRM approach for this investment
- Plan the new or changed capabilities necessary to realize the benefits
- Plan the investments needed to make the changes necessary to create or change the capabilities
- Optimize the plan to reduce waste and have acceptable levels of resource, risk, cost, quality and time
- Implement the plan
- Review the impact of the plan implementation on the Benefit Measures and use insights to improve
- On completion of the plan, ensure BRM continues to sustain the capabilities and realisation of benefits

BRM practices aim to ensure the alignment between project outcomes and business strategies:

"If value is to be created and sustained, benefits need to be actively managed through the whole investment lifecycle. From describing and selecting the investment, through programme scoping and design, delivery of the programme to create the capability and execution of the business changes required to utilise that capability, and the operation and eventual retirement of the resulting assets. Unfortunately, this is rarely the case."

— APM Benefits Management Special Interest Group

Under BRM, outcomes are changes identified as important by stakeholders and can be strategic or non-strategic. A benefit is a measurable positive impact of change. A dis-benefit is a measurable negative impact of change. Successful BRM requires accountable people, relevant measures and proactive management.

As with all project management methodologies, BRM has clear roles and responsibilities, processes, principles and deliverables. The main roles are Business Change Managers (BCMs) who help the Benefits Owners (i.e. the main beneficiaries) identify, plan and review the expected benefits from the change and project managers who deliver the reliable capability on time and within budget. A generic BRM process is then as aside.

To identify the investment outcomes, pictorial views of the outcomes of interest on an outcome map (also called a results chain, benefits dependency network or benefit map) can be created. See next section. This technique supports agreement of the outcomes sought as it shows the outcomes and relationships between them on a single page. They can be agreed upon and communicated clearly as a result.

Data can then be captured either separately or within a suitable modelling tool for each outcome that will include the benefit measures used for each, ownership and accountability information and information to support realisation management.

== Benefit mapping ==
Constructing benefits maps or graphs is usually done from right to left, with what is attempting to be achieved (often called objectives, strategic outcomes etc.) being the start point, then moving through intermediate outcomes to the things required to cause these to happen at the very left.

=== Benefits dependency networks ===
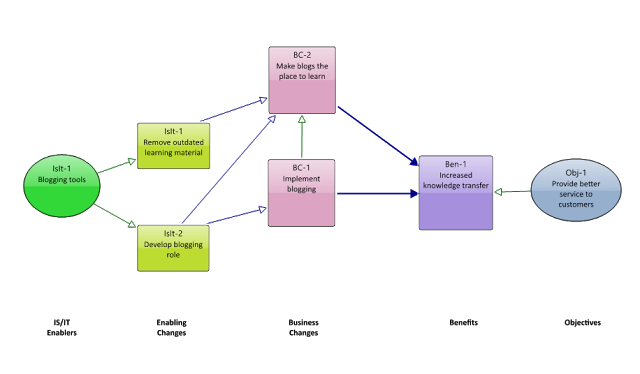
A diagram showing the benefits dependency network modelling style by John Ward and Elizabeth Daniel

The benefits dependency network (BDN) has five types of object within maps.

- Investment objectives: A small number of statements that define the focus of the project and how it links to investment drivers.
- Benefits: Advantages to specific individuals or groups of individuals.
- Business changes: Changes required in the business to hit the Benefits.
- Enabling changes: Changes required to allow the business changes to happen.
- IS/IT enablers: "The information systems and technology required to support the realization of identified benefits and allow the necessary changes to be undertaken."

=== Benefits dependency map ===
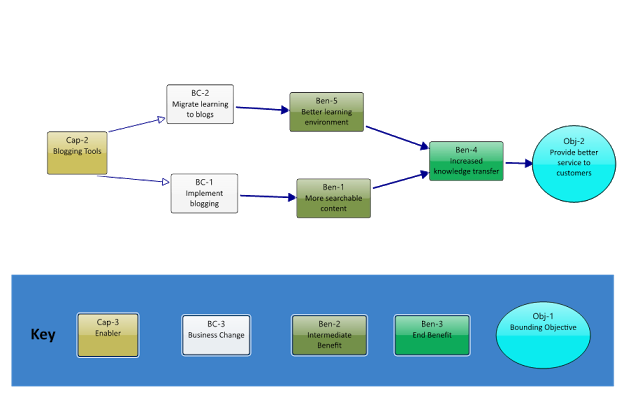
A diagram showing the benefits dependency map modelling style by Gerald Bradley

The benefits dependency map (BDM) also has five types of object on the maps

- Bounding objective: Measurable end goals which support the vision of what is being attempted.
- End benefit: Independent benefits (not interlinked) that achieve the objective.
- Intermediate benefit: "An outcome of change which is perceived as positive by a stakeholder".
- Business change: Changes to the business or environment of the business.
- Enabler: Something developed / purchased to enable the realisation of benefit.

=== Results chain ===
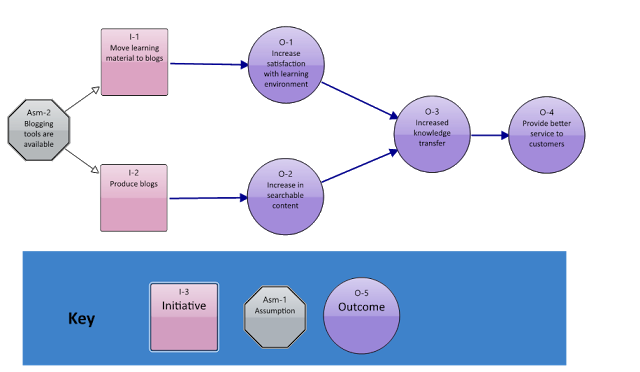
A diagram showing the results chain modelling style by John Thorp

The results chain has four types of object on the maps.

- Outcome: The results being aimed at.
- Initiative: An action or activity that contributes to outcomes.
- Contribution: A measurable description of how an initiative is expected to contribute to an outcome.
- Assumption: Something believed to be required to realize outcomes or initiatives which the organisation has no or little control over.

== See also ==
- Benefit shortfall
- Business case
- Cost-benefit analysis
- Value engineering
