= Albert O. Hirschman =

American economist (1915–2012)

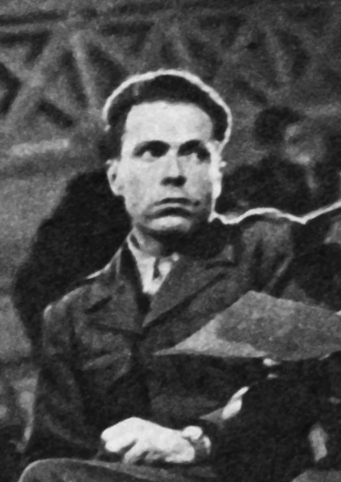
- Hirschman in 1945
- Born: Otto Albert Hirschmann; April 7, 1915; Berlin, German Empire
- Died: December 10, 2012 (aged 97); Ewing Township, New Jersey, U.S.

Academic background
- Education: University of Berlin (transferred, 1933); HEC Paris (diploma, 1935); London School of Economics (fellowship, 1935–1936); University of Trieste (laurea, 1938)

Academic work
- Discipline: Political economy
- Institutions: University of California, Berkeley (1941–1942); Federal Reserve Board (1946–1951); World Bank (1952–1954); Yale University (1956–1958); Columbia University (1958–1964); Harvard University (1964–1974); Institute for Advanced Study (1974–2012)
- Notable ideas: Strategy of unbalanced growth; Hiding hand principle; Exit, voice, and loyalty model; Hirschman cycle
- Website: Information at IDEAS / RePEc

Albert Otto Hirschman (born Otto Albert Hirschmann; April 7, 1915 – December 10, 2012) was an American economist. He was the author of several influential books on development economics, political economy, and political ideology including The Strategy of Economic Development (1958), Exit, Voice, and Loyalty (1970), The Passions and the Interests (1977), and The Rhetoric of Reaction (1991). He was a founding figure in the School of Social Science at the Institute for Advanced Study and an influential economic advisor to Latin American leaders. In World War II, he played a key role in rescuing refugees from occupied France with the Emergency Rescue Committee.

== Early life and education ==
=== Childhood in Germany, 1915–1933 ===
Albert Otto Hirschman was born Otto Albert Hirschmann on April 7, 1915 to a middle-class Jewish family in Berlin, Germany, the son of Carl Hirschmann, a surgeon, and Hedwig Marcuse Hirschmann. He had one elder sister, Ursula Hirschmann, and one younger, Eva. The family was "distant from Jewish tradition and religion," in his own words, and he was baptized as Lutheran though never confirmed. The family rented an apartment on Berlin's Hohenzollernstrasse and paid for personal tutors in music and French through the early 1930s.

Hirschman attended the Französiches Gymnasium Berlin, graduating in 1932. In 1931, he joined the Social Democratic Party's youth movement, the Workers Socialist Youth, where he became interested in economics through the lectures and pamphlets of the Austro-Marxist economist Otto Bauer, particularly a lecture on Kondratiev cycles. He was strongly influenced by the philosophy of Hegel at this time and wrote his first independent essay on the Hegelian philosophy of the family from The Phenomenology of Spirit.

In 1932, he began studying economics at the law faculty of the University of Berlin, where he remained active in anti-fascist politics. His studies "appear to have focused on deep background readings in classical political economy and on the pamphlets he was studying in [Workers Socialist Youth] study groups."

=== Anti-fascism in Europe, 1933–1941 ===
In 1933, after Hitler's rise to chancellorship in Germany in January and his father's death from cancer on March 31, Hirschman emigrated to Paris on April 2 at the invitation of his former French tutor. He continued his economic studies at HEC Paris, where he was introduced to interregional commerce by Albert Demangeon. In Paris, he and his sister Ursula grew close to Raphael Abramovitch Rein and his children Lia and Mark Rein and also to the Italian anti-fascist activist Eugenio Colorni, who would marry Ursula in December 1935. Hirschman completed his diploma at the HEC in the summer of 1935.

Next he took a fellowship at the London School of Economics (LSE), where he was particularly influenced by economist Piero Sraffa (Colorni's cousin) and the international trade economist Philip Barrett Whale. Whale introduced him to empirical work and recommended a career in economic intelligence.

Hirschman returned to Paris in June 1936 and reached out to Neu Beginnen contacts from his time in the Workers Socialist Youth to become involved in anti-fascist fighting on behalf of the Spanish Republic in the Spanish Civil War from July to the end of October. He fought under the banner of POUM, most likely at the Battle of Monte Pelado.

After his time in Spain, Hirschman relocated to Trieste to join Ursula and Eugenio Colorni. In Trieste, he began to work on Italian demographic statistics with Pierpaolo Luzzatto-Fegiz, applying the ideas of British demographer George Knibbs. Soon after, he also began economic intelligence work to counter Fascist economic propaganda, and he worked as an illegal newspaper and document smuggler between Trieste and Paris for Colorni's anti-fascist resistance. He received his laurea, later translated to a doctorate in economics, from the University of Trieste in 1938 for a thesis on the franc Poincaré begun with Whale at the LSE.

Hirschman returned to Paris in the summer of 1938 and began to work under Robert Marjolin and Charles Rist producing a quarterly bulletin for the Institut de recherches économiques et sociales of the Sorbonne, backed by the Rockefeller Foundation. He enlisted in the French army in the spring of 1939 and served briefly on a work gang in the Loire Valley.

After France's 1940 surrender to the Nazis during World War II, Hirschman worked with Varian Fry from the Emergency Rescue Committee to help many of Europe's leading artists and intellectuals escape from occupied France to Spain through paths in the Pyrenees Mountains and then to Portugal, with their exodus to end in the United States. Those rescued included Marc Chagall, Hannah Arendt, and Marcel Duchamp. Hirschman's participation in these rescues is one aspect of the 2023 Netflix series Transatlantic, in which a fictionalized version of him is played by Lucas Englander. His own escape was arranged by economist John Bell Condliffe and the Rockefeller Foundation; he left Europe at the end of 1940 and arrived in the US on January 14, 1941, taking the name Albert Otto Hirschman on his arrival.

=== Arrival in America, 1941–1943 ===
From 1941 to 1943 Hirschman was a Rockefeller Fellow at the University of California, Berkeley. At Berkeley, he worked in an open-ended fellowship with John Bell Condliffe on matters of "autarchy, bilateralism, and the formation of trading blocs" in international trade. This work included work on indices of market concentration that would lead him to what is now called the Herfindahl–Hirschman index. He shared an office with Alexander Gerschenkron, who would remain an important colleague for many years later. Also at Berkeley, he met Sarah Chapiro and proposed to her within eight weeks of meeting. They married in June 1941 and would remain married until her death in 2012. The final product of this fellowship was his first book, National Power and the Structure of Foreign Trade; the manuscript was rushed to completion by the end of 1942 to allow Hirschman to join the Army after the Pearl Harbor attack.

== Career ==
=== US government service, 1943–1951 ===
Hirschman served in the United States Army from 1943 to 1946, where he initially enlisted in the infantry as a private in April and then was assigned to the Office of Strategic Services (the forerunner of the CIA) in the autumn, on the basis of his language skills. He shipped out to Europe in February 1944. He spent seven months in Algiers, working as a French instructor. He was next assigned to follow the front up from Italy in September 1944, beginning in Monte Casserta, then to Florence, and finally to Udine. After the end of the war, he served as the interpreter for German general Anton Dostler at the first Allied war crimes trial, concluding with Dostler's execution December 1, 1945. While away, his wife gave birth to their first daughter, Katia, in October 1944.

After returning, he struggled to find government intelligence work due to FBI security concerns over his prior involvement in the Workers Socialist Youth and at length he took a job in the United States Department of Commerce's Clearing Office for Foreign Transactions. His prior colleague Gerschenkron recruited him to the Federal Reserve Board by the end of 1946 and he became chief of the Western European and British Commonwealth Section from 1946 to 1952. In this role, he conducted and published analyses of postwar European reconstruction and newly created international economic institutions and came to the attention of Richard M. Bissell Jr., who set him to work at the Economic Cooperation Administration for the Marshall Plan. He sought transfer to Paris in 1951, but was refused the position due to an FBI security review.

=== First work in Latin America, 1951–1956 ===
Instead, he took an offer from the World Bank to aid the national government of Colombia in economic development during the civil war period known as La Violencia. From 1952 to 1954 he was a financial advisor to the National Planning Board of Colombia, but often clashed with fellow advisors Lauchlin Currie and Jacques Torfs. The advisory council fell apart in the wake of the coup d'état of 1953, and Hirschman's two-year contract expired in 1954.

Rather than leave, Hirschman stayed in Bogotá for another 2 years, working as a private economic consultant with George Kalmanoff. Here he worked directly with private sector corporations to solve business problems directly and wrote appeals to investors such as the pamphlet "Columbia: Highlights of a Developing Economy" and a "Guidebook for American Investors" for Central America. He attended an October 1954 Massachusetts Institute of Technology development economics conference to present "Economics and Investment Planning: Reflections Based on Experience in Columbia" at the invitation of Max Millikan, but otherwise had little contact with academic economics in these years.

=== First academic positions, 1956–1972 ===
In July 1956, he received an invitation to serve as a visiting professor at Yale University 1956–1957 at the suggestion of his friend Thomas Schelling, bringing the family back to the US. Here, he began work on his The Strategy of Economic Development and extended the professorship one more year with funding from Norman S. Buchanan at the Rockefeller Foundation. Next, still without a permanent position, he arranged a summer as a scholar in residence at the RAND Corporation for 1958 in partnership with Charles Lindblom.

Columbia University next hired him for a temporary teaching position to cover for the recently deceased Ragnar Nurske, but then as The Strategy of Economic Development made an impact in the fall of 1958, Columbia converted it to a permanent professorship. Here, he became a Latin America specialist for the Twentieth Century Fund, where he provided the opening chapter for Latin American Issues (1961) and completed his Journeys Towards Progress (1962) begun with Lindblom. Throughout this time he made frequent trips back to Latin America and collaborated with Latin American scholars and politicians including Orlando Fals Borda, Carlos Lleras Restrepo, Celso Furtado, and Camilo Torres Restrepo.

In 1963, Hirschman's former colleague Gerschenkron arranged a new position for Hirschman at Harvard University jointly in political economy at the Graduate School of Public Administration (later the Harvard Kennedy School) and as a Latin America specialist in the Department of Economics. This position began in 1964, which coincided with a Brazilian coup which forced his friend Furtado into exile and inspired Hirschman to change his research directions, which would lead to his Development Projects Observed (1967) with its "hiding hand" principle and Exit, Voice, and Loyalty (1970). He spent 1964–1965 engaged in extensive international travel to observe World Bank development projects for his research, and only moved into Cambridge, Massachusetts in the fall of 1966.

He did not fit in well into Harvard's Department of Economics culturally. He spent a year visiting Stanford University at the behest of political scientist Gabriel Almond 1968–1969, exploring a permanent position but deciding against. He began to reach out to the Princeton University Institute for Advanced Study (IAS) as a possible next position in 1971, particularly to work with Clifford Geertz and Carl Kaysen on their new Program in Social Change.

=== Institute for Advanced Study, 1972–2012 ===
Hirschman took a visiting position at the IAS 1972–1973 and a permanent position in 1974; he remained until his death in 2012. His first year was overshadowed by a vicious controversy around the IAS appointment of Robert Bellah, but he nonetheless made important, lasting contacts with colleagues Pierre Bourdieu and David Apter. He was unanimously offered a permanent position and opted to return, in large part to permanently escape teaching duties.

He visited Latin America again in the summer of 1973, and, concerned about a collapsing political middle, he wrote "The Changing Tolerance for Income Inequality in the Course of Economic Development." Ten days before the 1973 Chilean coup d'etat, Hirschman was made chairman of the Joint Committee on Latin American Studies of the Social Science Research Council in New York City, and he immediately used the position to support Latin Americans fleeing authoritarian government, such as Osvaldo Sunkel, Alejandro Foxley, Fernando Henrique Cardoso, Guillermo O'Donnell, and Tomás Eloy Martínez. He organized a multinational collaboration to organize this research while moving to the IAS and then brought in Indiana University political scientist David Collier, then visiting Princeton at its Center of International Studies, to coordinate the project. He was also assisted at the IAS for two years by Brazilian economist José Serra. Hirschman took another trip to Latin America in the summer of 1976, visiting Colombia, Venezuela, Brazil, Argentina, and Chile. The project's focus became the nature of authoritarianism in the heavily industrialized countries of Latin America. One of its culminating achievements was the anthology The New Authoritarianism in Latin America (1980).

In this period, Hirschman's work went to the historical roots of political economy and ideological justifications for capitalism in a project that would result in The Passions and the Interests (1977). Hirschman's book originated in reflection on a quote of Montesquieu's that became an epigraph for the manuscript: "It is fortunate for men to be in a situation where, though their passions may prompt them to be wicked, they have nevertheless an interest in not being so." At this time he returned to Hegel for the first time since childhood via a book of Paul Chamley's, via a manuscript of Judith Shklar's on The Philosophy of Right, and via Shlomo Avineri's Hegel's Theory of the Modern State (1974), which together brought him to James Steuart. Simultaneously, he worked with Quentin Skinner at the IAS and became familiar with the Cambridge School in the history of ideas and developed a close intellectual relationship with Amartya Sen, who had married his niece Eva.

After the publication of The Passions and the Interests, Hirschman began collaborating with more European social scientists at the IAS, such as Alessandro Pizzorno and Claus Offe, as well as the visiting John Rawls. An IAS group formed to discuss crises of liberal welfare states, discussing Mancur Olson's The Logic of Collective Action and Jürgen Habermas's Legitimation Crisis. At the same time, Hirschman and Geertz worked to expand the School of Social Science at the IAS, recruiting Michael Walzer. In the summer of 1979, at the invitation of Robert Bellah, Hirschman attended the "Morality as a Problem in the Social Sciences" conference at Berkeley with Habermas, Richard Rorty, Charles Taylor, and Michel de Certeau. After 1979, Hirschman increasingly moved away from development economics and began to speak of it as past work, as in the lecture "The Rise and Decline of Development Economics." In order to counter what he felt were pessimistic and fatalistic conclusions in Olson's work, Charles Taylor's and others', such as Christopher Lasch's The Culture of Narcissism, he wrote his next book Shifting Involvements: Private Interest and Public Action (1982), which introduced the Hirschman cycle. In the spring of 1982 he gave the Marc Bloch Lecture at the Sorbonne at the invitation of historian François Furet.

After Shifting Involvements was received relatively poorly, Hirschman returned to Latin America at the behest of the Inter-American Foundation' s director Peter Hakim and produced Getting Ahead Collectively: Grassroots Experiences in Latin America (1984). For this trip, from January to June 1983 he visited forty-five development projects across six countries: the Dominican Republic, Colombia, Peru, Chile, Argentina, Uruguay, and Brazil. Hirschman described the book as "not a scholarly treatise" but rather a "reasoned travelogue."

Hirschman retired from active membership of the IAS in 1985, but continued working emeritus; his final major book was The Rhetoric of Reaction (1991) and his final fieldwork was in Berlin after the fall of the Berlin Wall, winter 1990–1991. He became the namesake of the Albert O. Hirschman Chair in Economics at the IAS, which first went to game theorist Eric Maskin. He had four festschrifts: one at the University of Notre Dame in 1984, one at the IAS in 1988, one in 1989 at the University of Buenos Aires, and finally one at the Massachusetts Institute of Technology. The Social Science Research Council created an Albert O. Hirschman Prize, first awarded in 2007.

Hirschman began to decline in health after a fall in the Swiss Alps in July 1996 that caused a cerebral hematoma. He became unable to write and speak, but took up painting. He died at the age of 97 on December 10, 2012, less than a year after the death of his wife of over 70 years, Sarah Hirschman (née Chapiro), in January.

== Work ==
Hirschman's first major contribution was in the area of development economics with the 1958 book The Strategy of Economic Development. Here he emphasized the need for unbalanced growth, and Unbalanced Growth was its working title. He argued that disequilibria should be encouraged to stimulate growth and help mobilize resources and that developing countries are short of decision-making skills. Key to this was encouraging industries with many linkages to other firms. He argued against "Big Push" approaches to development, such as those advocated by Paul Rosenstein-Rodan.

In the 1960s, Hirschman praised the works of Peruvian intellectuals José Carlos Mariátegui and Víctor Raúl Haya de la Torre, stating "paradoxically, the most ambitious attempt to theorize the revolution of Latin American society arose in a country that to date has experienced very little social change: I am talking about Peru and the writings of Haya de la Torre and Mariátegui". He developed the hiding hand principle in his 1967 book Development Projects Observed (1967), and it was later extracted into the essay "The principle of the hiding hand" in The Public Interest magazine in collaboration with editor Irving Kristol.

His later work was in political economy. In Exit, Voice, and Loyalty (1970) he described the three basic possible responses to decline in firms or polities: quitting, speaking up, and staying quiet. He characterized three types of arguments typically made by conservatives, arguments from perversity, futility, and jeopardy, in The Rhetoric of Reaction (1991).

In The Passions and the Interests (1977) Hirschman recounted a history of the ideas laying the intellectual groundwork for capitalism. He describes how thinkers in the seventeenth and eighteenth centuries embraced the sin of avarice as an important counterweight to humankind's destructive passions. Capitalism was promoted by thinkers including Montesquieu, Sir James Steuart, and Adam Smith as repressing the passions for "harmless" commercial activities. Hirschman noted that terms including "vice" and "passion" gave way to "such bland terms" as "advantage" and "interest." Hirschman described it as the book he most enjoyed writing. According to Hirschman biographer Jeremy Adelman, it reflected Hirschman's political moderation, a challenge to reductive accounts of human nature by economists as a "utility-maximizing machine" as well as Marxian or communitarian "nostalgia for a world that was lost to consumer avarice."

=== Herfindahl–Hirschman Index ===
In 1945, Hirschman proposed a market concentration index which was the square root of the sum of the squares of the market share of each participant in the market. In 1950, Orris C. Herfindahl proposed a similar index (but without the square root), apparently unaware of the prior work. Thus, it is usually referred to as the Herfindahl–Hirschman index.

== Awards ==
Hirschman was a member of the American Academy of Arts and Sciences (1965), the American Philosophical Society (1979), and the United States National Academy of Sciences (1987).

In 2001, Hirschman was named among the top 100 American intellectuals, as measured by academic citations, in Richard Posner's book, Public Intellectuals: A Study of Decline.

In 2002, Hirschman was awarded Doctor Honoris Causa by the European University Institute, Florence, Italy.

In 2003, he won the Benjamin E. Lippincott Award from the American Political Science Association to recognize a work of exceptional quality by a living political theorist for his book The Passions and the Interests: Political Arguments for Capitalism before Its Triumph.

In 2007, the Social Science Research Council established a biennial prize in honor of Hirschman.

== Selected works ==
=== Books ===
- 1945. National Power and the Structure of Foreign Trade 1980 expanded ed., Berkeley : University of California Press
- 1955. Colombia; highlights of a developing economy. Bogotá: Banco de la Republica Press.
- 1958. The Strategy of Economic Development. New Haven, Conn.: Yale University Press. ISBN 0-300-00559-8
- 1961. Latin American issues; essays and comments New York: Twentieth Century Fund.
- 1963. Journeys toward Progress: Studies of Economic Policy-Making in Latin America. New York: Twentieth Century Fund
- 1967. Development Projects Observed. Washington, D.C.: The Brookings Institution. ISBN 0-815-73651-7 (paper).
- 1970. Exit, Voice, and Loyalty: Responses to Decline in Firms, Organizations, and States. Cambridge, Massachusetts: Harvard University Press. ISBN 0-674-27660-4 (paper).
- 1971. A Bias for Hope: Essays on Development and Latin America. New Haven: Yale University Press.
- 1977. The Passions and the Interests: Political Arguments For Capitalism Before Its Triumph. Princeton, NJ: Princeton University Press. ISBN 0-691-01598-8.
- 1980. National Power and the Structure of Foreign Trade. Berkeley: University of California Press.
- 1981. Essays in trespassing: economics to politics and beyond. Cambridge (Eng.); New York: Cambridge University Press.
- 1982. Shifting involvements: private interest and public action. Princeton, N.J.: Princeton University Press.
- 1984. Getting ahead collectively: grassroots experiences in Latin America (with photographs by Mitchell Denburg). New York: Pergamon Press
- 1985. A bias for hope: essays on development and Latin America. Boulder: Westview Press.
- 1986. Rival views of market society and other recent essays. New York: Viking.
- 1991. The Rhetoric of Reaction: Perversity, Futility, Jeopardy. Cambridge, Massachusetts: The Belknap Press of Harvard University Press. ISBN 0-674-76867-1 (cloth) and ISBN 0-674-76868-X (paper).
- 1995. A propensity to self-subversion. Cambridge, Massachusetts: Harvard University Press.
- 1998. Crossing boundaries: selected writings. New York: Zone Books; Cambridge, Massachusetts: Distributed by the MIT Press.
- 2013. The Essential Hirschman edited by Jeremy Adelman (Princeton University Press) 384 pages; 16 essays

=== Articles ===
- "On Measures of Dispersion for a Finite Distribution." Journal of the American Statistical Association 38, no. 223 (September 1943): 346–352.
- "The Commodity Structure of World Trade." The Quarterly Journal of Economics 57, no. 4 (August 1943): 565–595.
- "Devaluation and the Trade Balance: A Note." The Review of Economics and Statistics 31, no. 1 (February 1949): 50–53.
- "Negotiations and the Issues." The Review of Economics and Statistics, 33, no. 1 (February 1951): 49–55.
- "Types of Convertibility." The Review of Economics and Statistics, 33, no. 1 (February 1951): 60–62.
- "Currency Appreciation as an Anti-Inflationary Device: Further Comment." The Quarterly Journal of Economics, 66, no. 1 (February 1952): 117–120.
- "Economic Policy in Underdeveloped Countries." Economic Development and Cultural Change, 5, no. 4 (July 1957): 362–370.
- "Investment Policies and 'Dualism' in Underdeveloped Countries." The American Economic Review 47, no. 5 (September 1957): 550–570.
- "Invitation to Theorizing about the Dollar Glut." The Review of Economics and Statistics 42, no. 1 (February 1960): 100–102.
- "The Commodity Structure of World Trade: Reply." The Quarterly Journal of Economics 75, no. 1 (February 1961): 165–166.
- "Models of Reformmongering." The Quarterly Journal of Economics 77, no. 2 (May 1963): 236–257.
- "Obstacles to Development: A Classification and a Quasi-Vanishing Act." Economic Development and Cultural Change 13, no. 4 (July 1965): 385–393.
- "The Political Economy of Import-Substituting Industrialization in Latin America." The Quarterly Journal of Economics 82, no. 1 (February 1968): 1–32.
- "Underdevelopment, Obstacles to the Perception of Change, and Leadership." Daedalus 97, no. 3 (Summer 1968): 925–937.
- "An Alternative Explanation of Contemporary Harriednes." The Quarterly Journal of Economics 87, no. 4 (November 1973): 634–637.
- "The Changing Tolerance for Income Inequality in the Course of Economic Development", World Development, Vol. 1, No. 12, (December 1973).
- "On Hegel, Imperialism, and Structural Stagnation", Journal of Development Economics 3 (1976): 1–8. doi:10.1016/0304-3878(76)90037-7
- "Beyond Asymmetry: Critical Notes on Myself as a Young Man and on Some Other Old Friends." International Organization 32, no. 1 (Winter 1978): 45–50.
- "Exit, Voice, and the State." World Politics 31, no. 1 (October 1978): 90–107.
- "The Rise and Decline of Development Economics." International Symposium on Latin America, Bar-Ilan University, Israel, 1980.
- "'Exit, Voice, and Loyalty': Further Reflections and a Survey of Recent Contributions." The Milbank Memorial Fund Quarterly. Health and Society 58, no. 3 (Summer 1980): 430–453.
- "Rival Interpretations of Market Society: Civilizing, Destructive, or Feeble?." Journal of Economic Literature 20, no. 4 (December 1982): 1463–1484.
- "Against Parsimony: Three Easy Ways of Complicating Some Categories of Economic Discourse." Bulletin of the American Academy of Arts and Sciences 37, no. 8 (May 1984): 11–28.
- "Against Parsimony: Three Easy Ways of Complicating Some Categories of Economic Discourse." American Economic Review 72, no. 2 (1984): 89–96
- "University Activities Abroad and Human Rights Violations: Exit, Voice, or Business as Usual." Human Rights Quarterly 6, no. 1 (February 1984): 21–26.
- "The Political Economy of Latin American Development: Seven Exercises in Retrospection." Latin American Research Review 22, no. 3 (1987): 7–36.
- "Exit, Voice, and the Fate of the German Democratic Republic: An Essay in Conceptual History." World Politics 45, no. 2 (January 1993): 173–202.
- "Social Conflicts as Pillars of Democratic Market Society." Political Theory 22, no. 2 (May 1994): 203–218.

== See also ==
- Economic development
- Hirschman cycle
- Exit, Voice, and Loyalty Model
- Latin American studies
- Fernando Henrique Cardoso
- Guillermo O'Donnell
- Philippe C. Schmitter
