= The law of conservation of misery =

Rule in folk wisdom

The Law of Conservation of Misery is a folk wisdom that states that the total amount of misery in a system is constant. This implies that when you try to decrease the misery in one aspect of a system, you will increase the misery in some of the other aspects. In other words, for each problem you solve, at least one new problem is created, or as many new problems that together equal the trouble caused by the original problem.

== See also ==
- The Rhetoric of Reaction
- Waterbed theory
