= The Rhetoric of Reaction =

1991 book by Albert O. Hirschman

The Rhetoric of Reaction: Perversity, Futility, Jeopardy
- Author: Albert O. Hirschman
- Subject: Criticism of Conservatism
- Publisher: The Belknap Press of Harvard University Press
- Publication date: 1991
- Pages: Paperback: 224 p. Hardback: 212 p.
- ISBN: 978-0674768680
- OCLC: 21972246

The Rhetoric of Reaction: Perversity, Futility, Jeopardy is a book by theorist Albert O. Hirschman which analyzes the rhetoric of conservatism that has been used to oppose social change. In his historical survey, he finds three reactionary theses have been deployed frequently: perversity, futility, and jeopardy. He says the theses and their corresponding narratives are simplistic, flawed, and cut off debate. He then discusses three progressive theses, also flawed, and proposes a new framework.

== Summary ==
Hirschman notes that he began his study in the mid-1980s during "the ascendant and triumphant conservative and neoconservative movement." He takes as a starting point a famous 1949 lecture by English sociologist Thomas Humphrey Marshall on the "development of citizenship". Marshall's lecture presented a three-century progression in which the civil, political, and social dimensions of citizenship had gradually moved forward in the West until finally being achieved. Hirschman argues, however, that Marshall's notion of an orderly advance was undermined by its omission of the disruptive role played throughout by reactionary backlash:

Is it not true that ... each and every one of Marshall's three progressive thrusts has been followed by ideological counterthrusts of extraordinary force? And have not these counterthrusts been at the origin of convulsive social and political struggles often leading to setbacks for the intended progressive programs as well as to much human suffering and misery? ... Once we contemplate this protracted and perilous seesawing of action and reaction, we come to appreciate more than ever the profound wisdom of Whitehead's well-known observation, "The major advances in civilization are processes which all but wreck the societies in which they occur."

Hirschman then proceeds to analyze three reactionary theses, which he believes have been used repeatedly to thwart progress. As historical examples, he cites the conservative response to (1) the French Revolution, (2) the fight for universal suffrage in the 19th and 20th centuries, and (3) the creation of the welfare state in his own time.

=== Reactionary theses ===
Hirschman describes the reactionary theses thus:

- According to the Perversity Thesis, any purposeful action to improve some feature of the political, social, or economic status quo only serves, perversely, to exacerbate the very condition one wishes to remedy (compare: Unintended consequences).
- The Futility Thesis holds that attempts at social transformation will be unavailing, that they will fail to "make a dent" in the problem, and the motives of those who keep attempting futile reforms are suspect.
- The Jeopardy Thesis states that the risk of the proposed change is too great as it imperils some previous, precious accomplishment.

He characterizes these theses as "rhetorics of intransigence" that do not further constructive debate. Moreover, he says they turn optimism about social advancement into pessimism.

=== Progressive theses ===
Next, Hirschman describes progressive theses which he regards as similarly misguided:

- The Synergy Illusion – the idea that all reforms work together and reinforce each other, rather than sometimes being incompatible;
- The Imminent-Danger Thesis – the belief that urgent action is necessary to avoid disaster, and any delays or inaction could be catastrophic;
- “Having History on One’s Side” – a faith in the inevitability of one’s preferred outcome, e.g., "The arc of the moral universe is long, but it bends toward justice." – Martin Luther King Jr.

=== Proposal ===
Hirschman recommends instead what he considers two essential ingredients to adopting a sensible and "mature" political position: "(1) There are dangers and risks in both action and inaction. The risks of both should be canvassed, assessed, and guarded against to the extent possible. (2) The baneful consequences of either action or inaction can never be known with certainty but our reaction to either is affected by the two types of alarm-sounding Cassandras with whom we have become acquainted. When it comes to forecasts of impending mishaps or disasters, it is well to remember the saying Le pire n'est pas toujours sûr—the worst is not always sure (to happen)."

== Editions ==
- Hirschman, Albert O. (1991). The Rhetoric of Reaction: Perversity, Futility, Jeopardy. Cambridge, MA: The Belknap Press of Harvard University Press. ISBN 978-0674768673.

== See also ==
- The law of conservation of misery
- Precautionary principle
- Rhetoric
