= The Strategy of Economic Development =

1958 book by Albert O. Hirschman

The Strategy of Economic Development is a 1958 book on economic development by Albert O. Hirschman. Hirschman critiques the theories of balanced growth put forward by Ragnar Nurkse and Paul Rosenstein-Rodan, which call for simultaneous, large-scale increases in investment across multiple sectors to spur economic growth. Hirschman argues that such strategies are unrealistic and often infeasible in underdeveloped countries. In place of balanced growth, Hirschman proposes a theory of unbalanced growth, where "imbalances" and "pressure points" created by the growth process can be used to identify areas where policymakers can intervene. In addition, Hirschman introduces the notions of backward linkages---the demand created by a new industry for intermediate goods---and forward ones---the knock-on effects on industries who use the present industry's goods as inputs.

Along with Arthur Lewis's Theory of Economic Growth, and Walt Rostow's Stages of Economic Growth, the Strategy is often considered one of the seminal works of development economics.
