= Accountability partner =

Person who helps another to keep a commitment

An accountability partner is someone who supports another person to keep a commitment or maintain progress on a desired goal. They will often be a trusted friend or acquaintance who will regularly ask an individual about their progress or receive confessions of moral wrongdoing. Accountability coaches, who are professionals specializing in accountability, also offer accountability partnership as a service for a fee. Accountability partners can interact through regular in-person meetings, through the internet, or through a mixture of interactions. Within evangelical Christianity, accountability partners and groups are used in efforts to resist sexual temptation, including masturbation, viewing pornography, or pre-marital sex. In recent years, numerous kinds of accountability software have been developed, surveillance apps which track a user's internet use and send reports to a predetermined accountability partner.

Outside of evangelical Christianity, accountability partners have been used in a range of contexts for individuals who want to keep commitments, improve their productivity, or maintain self-care routines. This includes use in health and wellbeing, business, and academia. Studies of accountability partnership programmes have found improved results in practices such as self-examination for skin cancer in at-risk groups or the production of scholarship in a university department.

== Evangelical Christianity ==
Within evangelical Christianity, accountability partners have been used as part of programmes to help young men who have committed to sexual purity avoid temptations such as masturbation, viewing pornography, and sexual activity. The Promise Keepers, an Evangelical Christian parachurch organization for men, advocates the use of accountability groups to help their members put into practise their Seven Promises, including (but not exclusively) a promise to sexual purity. Members of the Promise Keepers believe that participation in these accountability groups is essential to their vision of godly masculinity and many find disclosing their internal struggles to a trusted other to be a powerfully cathartic exercise. A study of a Silver Ring Thing event in 2009 found that young people who committed to premarital abstinence were instructed to find an accountability partner of the same gender to help them keep their pledge. One study of students at an evangelical university in the US found a correlation between having an accountability and gender, with women more likely to have an accountability partner than men (59% for women; 42% for men).

=== Critical reception ===
In her 2015 study of evangelical men who pledge pre-marital chastity, sociologist Sarah Diefendorf argued that part of the power of accountability partnerships can be explained through the emotional release and relief of tension that is provided by the act of confessing one's sexual temptations. The sociologist John Bartkowski in 2000 notes the importance of emotional release provided by accountability groups, finding that they provide opportunities for intimacy among men where it is not uncommon for men to weep and hug one another. However, Bartkowski also notes that this intimacy required accountability group members to carefully manage homosocial intimacy, avoiding the emergence of erotic, homosexual attraction and maintaining traditional conceptions of gender. According to Bartkowski, means of achieving this include overt homophobic teaching, the emphasis of filial rather than romantic relationships, and the reinforcement of essentialist conceptions of masculinity. Diefendorf notes the importance of gender in accountability relationships: men will choose to be accountable to other men in order to avoid the potential for sexual temptation, which might occur if discussing sexual thoughts and activities so openly with women.

In his 2000 study of Promise Keepers, Bartkowski observed that while accountability groups aspire to ideals of equality and community (with chairs arranged in a circular formation, and members recruited from diverse social backgrounds and Christian denominations), this ideal is undercut by gendered aspects of these groups. Women are typically excluded from accountability groups and set up as an "other" against which group members define themselves, with gender-based inequality further exhibited through the endorsement of family structures based around male headship in these groups. Inequality is also manifested in formal and informal leadership structures which emerge in Promise Keeper accountability groups, based on proximity to Promise Keeper organizational structures or how long one has been a Christian.

=== Accountability software ===
Accountability partnership arrangements can also make use of accountability software. These are surveillance apps which track a user's internet activity and send reports to a predetermined accountability partner. Covenant Eyes—the largest of these apps—had in September 2022 over 50,000 downloads of its app and an annual revenue of US$26 million. A report by Wired in 2022 found a number of security risks with many of these apps. Additionally, tests conducted by the magazine found that searching terms such as "gay" or "lesbian", or accessing online support for young LGBT people, immediately sent a "questionable activity report" to the accountability partner.

== Secular use ==
Outside of Evangelical Christian culture, accountability partners are used to help individuals achieve goals and stick to commitments. Some people use accountability partners to help them commit to a regular exercise regime and eat healthily, while others have recommended the use of accountability partners to achieve professional goals. A study into skin self-examination among patient groups with a higher risk of skin cancer published in 2016 found that, while the use of smartphones and automatic reminders increased the incidence of self-examination, those assigned an accountability partner were not significantly more likely to self-examine. Further, satisfaction rates were lowest amongst those assigned the accountability partner group. In high stress jobs such as social work, accountability partners can be used to help a person follow through on a self-care plan and reduce occupational burnout.

In academia, some scholars make use of writing accountability groups to increase productivity, reduce procrastination and benefit from peer mentoring, community support, and improved time management skills. A 2022 study found that such groups can be particularly beneficial for scholars from a minority group, who are under-represented in higher education may not find the same support elsewhere. A 2018 study of an accountability partner programme at Washington State University found that the scheme improved the scholarly production of county-level faculty and fostered a more collaborative and encouraging research environment. The programme involved a formal matching process and required regular attendance at monthly meetings, along with administrative and financial support, all of which were found to be necessary for the success of such programmes.

== See also ==
- Twelve-step program § Sponsorship
