= Exit, Voice, and Loyalty =

Book on economic and political theory

- Author: Albert O. Hirschman
- Publication date: 1970
- Pages: 162
- ISBN: 0-674-27660-4

Exit, Voice, and Loyalty: Responses to Decline in Firms, Organizations, and States (1970) is an influential treatise written by Albert O. Hirschman. The work hinges on a conceptual ultimatum that confronts consumers in the face of deteriorating quality of goods and services: either exit or voice. The framework presented in the book has been applied to topics such as protest movements, migration, political parties, and interest groups, as well as to personal relationships.

== Summary ==
The Exit, Voice and Loyalty model states that members of an organization, whether a business, a nation or any other form of human grouping, have essentially two possible responses when they perceive that the organization is demonstrating a decrease in quality or benefit to the member: they can exit (withdraw from the relationship); or, they can voice (attempt to repair or improve the relationship through communication of the complaint, grievance or proposal for change). For example, the citizens of a country may respond to increasing political repression in two ways: emigrate or protest. Similarly, employees can choose to quit their unpleasant job, or express their concerns in an effort to improve the situation. Disgruntled customers can choose to shop elsewhere, or they ask for the manager.

Exit and voice themselves represent a union between economic and political action. Exit is associated with Adam Smith's invisible hand, in which buyers and sellers are free to move silently through the market, constantly forming and destroying relationships. Voice, on the other hand, is by nature political and at times confrontational.

While both exit and voice can be used to measure a decline in an organization, voice is by nature more informative in that it also provides reasons for the decline. Exit, taken alone, only provides the warning sign of decline. Exit and voice also interact in unique and sometimes unexpected ways; by providing greater opportunity for feedback and criticism, exit can be reduced; conversely, stifling of dissent leads to increased pressure for members of the organization to use the only other means available to express discontent, departure. The general principle, therefore, is that the greater the availability of exit, the less likely voice will be used. However, the interplay of loyalty can affect the cost-benefit analysis of whether to use exit or voice. Where there is loyalty to the organization (as evidenced by strong patriotism politically, or brand loyalty for consumers), exit may be reduced, especially where options to exit are not so appealing (small job market, political or financial hurdles to emigration or moving). Loyal members become especially devoted to the organization's success when their voice will be heard and when they can reform it.

By understanding the relationship between exit and voice, and the interplay that loyalty has with these choices, organizations can craft the means to better address their members' concerns and issues and thereby attempt to bring about an improvement. Failure to understand these competing pressures can lead to organizational decline and possible failure.

== Applications ==
Hirschman provides the example of a publicly funded school where the quality of education declined. Quality-conscious parents would increasingly remove their child to a privately funded school, given that they are relatively indifferent to the cost. A price-conscious parent might notice that decline but lack the resources to make exit a viable option. At some point the school would know there was a problem, having had a number of students leave, but have no financial incentive to change, as the parents left who cared sufficiently about the quality to point to exactly where it had failed. The school remains locked into that state. Hirschman notes that in this and similar cases ("connoisseur goods"), a "tight monopoly could be preferable", preventing exit of quality-conscious consumers. A lack of exit would be better for the school, if not the child, by keeping an active voice among the parents.

=== Membership organizations ===
Membership organizations, whether they be professional, community-based or business-oriented, face the perpetual challenge of knowing how engaged members are; how likely they are to remain members; and when they might cease to be members. Exit, Voice and Loyalty can be observed, reviewed and addressed as a matter of course, and in a learning organization, can result in reduced member "churn" and increased growth in member satisfaction, loyalty, referrals and growth. This usually entails some sort of survey efforts, social media inquiries, polling and individual interviews and/or group to maintain the necessary information for the organization to adapt to its members' needs.

Some studies confirm Hirschman's assertion that greater exit and entry costs heighten the likelihood of voice. Particularly when examining dispute resolution in contexts with limited exit opportunities, increased entry costs make workers' voice more likely.

=== Emigration ===
A key application of Hirschman's scheme of exit, voice and loyalty has been emigration. Drawing on the analogy of discontent consumers buying elsewhere, "exit" translated into leaving a country and migrating to a different nation-state, while "voice" described the option of articulating discontent, which as Hirschman noted, "can be graduated, all the way from faint grumbling to violent protest". Hirschman modeled these options as mutually exclusive and postulated a seesaw mechanism: the easier available the exit option, the lower the likelihood of voice. For rulers, emigration served as a safety-valve, by which the discontent renounced on their possibility to articulate protest. "Latin American powerholders have long encouraged their political enemies and potential critics to remove themselves from the scene through voluntary exile. The right of asylum, so generously practiced by all Latin American republics, could almost be considered as a 'conspiracy in restraint of voice'." However, not always did "exit subvert voice", as Hirschman himself acknowledged in a 1993 article. In 1989, in the GDR it was the escalating dynamic of out-migration that led those who wanted to stay to take to the streets to demand change. Exit triggered voice, and both worked in tandem.

Moreover, Hirschman's scheme assumes a model of nation-states as a jigsaw puzzle of clearly delimited "containers", and migration as the process of unidirectionally moving from one container to another. The emergence of transnational migration diagnosed since the 1990s has challenged this assumption. As emigrants increasingly maintain strong social ties (loyalty) to their country of origin, including a claim to have a say in its public affairs (voice) – Hoffmann argues – in transnational migration exit, voice and loyalty are no longer exclusive options; the nature of migrant transnationalism is defined precisely by the overlapping and simultaneity of these categories.

=== Politics ===
The exit, voice, loyalty model can be used to explain relationships between nation states and their citizens. The model predicts that when citizens have a credible exit threat and states are dependent on their citizens, states are less likely to take actions that the citizens would object to. For the case of increased taxation by the state, examples of credible exit threats include having the economic resources to flee or the ability to easily evade taxes. States are said to be dependent on their citizens if they value citizen loyalty more than they value the benefits that would result from a policy change. When both of these criteria are met, the model would predict that the state would not pursue a policy that would encourage citizens to exit or to use voice.

Additionally, the choice between using voice and exiting depends on which method has the least amount of costs and most benefits. In the case of Africa in precolonial and early colonial times, citizens often chose to exit in response to unfavorable policy changes and this exiting took the form of emigrating away from a state. Even when citizens could use voice, exiting was a better option because there was a large amount of open land that could yield benefits that were similar to the benefits obtained by living within the state. However, in the last hundred years there has been a shift in strategy away from migration (exit) and towards protesting (voice) because it is no longer as easy to find open land to exit to.

Loyalty is an essential force for Hirschman, shaping both voice and exit especially when it is difficult to join an organization. In the case of the newly-created Chinese middle class, which is mostly employed by the state, loyalty to the authoritarian government is very high. Their loyalty is bought through the difficulty in being admitted to their positions of relative financial prosperity and because emigration from China would result in losing significant status and income. These middle-class citizens are not completely voiceless, however, as they will protest the regime's choices through a process of remonstrations where they blame the failure of a policy on implementation by lower-level officials rather than criticize the policy directly. The regime is also aware that loyalty is bought at the price of financial stability; financial instability because of harmful policies would result in the same kinds of widespread protests that happened in 1989.

Hirschman postulated that contrary to the Hotelling–Downs analysis of political participation, those with "nowhere else to go" instead of being marginalized, their voices would become amplified. The rise of modern communications' amplifying effects has backed up Hirschman's position on voice. When citizens can easily mobilize, the cost of mobilization is low for the citizens but the impact of using voice in a mobilized manner can lead to a large cost for the state.

Exit can be an effective strategy for gaining greater political voice in the case of public goods In the case of Married Women's Property Acts in the mid-19th century, US states and territories expanded property rights to women in order to attract more women to move to their states and territories. In the Northeast, women were needed in large numbers to work both in industry and as servants; the ability for women to retain control of their earned wages and enter into contracts was an additional pull to encourage women to change residences. Similarly, competition for women residents among US territories in what is now the Western United States put pressure on legislatures to pass laws that would attract and retain these women in order to secure the benefits of obtaining statehood.

Miles Kahler uses Hirschman's framework in his 1984 book Decolonization in Britain and France to explain the behavior of political parties in France and the UK.

=== Employment ===
Hirschman's exit, voice, and loyalty analytical framework has underpinned important research within employment relations. Hirschman's insights that exit and voice are often, but not always, mutually exclusive and that loyalty will moderate a consumer's chances of voicing any misgivings are useful in explaining the link between workplace policies and outcomes.

There are different forms of employee voice, including individual voice, such as employee surveys, and collective voice, typically unions, as well as combinations of them. Contrasting forms of voice have different degrees of power. An assumption that consumers have power underpins Hirschman's original framework. For instance, Hirschman argued that, in most instances, once consumers or 'customer-members' of an organization had voiced their concerns, decision makers within the selling organization could be expected to search for the sources of those misgivings and attempt to remedy the situation.

In comparison to competitive consumer markets, the employment relationship requires a different approach to power as managers have more authority than lower level employees, leading to important implications for how exit, voice, and loyalty are treated within the employment context. For instance, in sharp contrast to Hirschman's argument that, where exit is possible, voice is likely to be determined by 'the extent to which customer-members are willing to trade off the certainty of exit against the uncertainties of an improvement in a deteriorated product', within the context of employment, how willing employees are to trade off the uncertainties and costs of exit against the certainties of staying will strongly influence employees' decisions to quit as well as to voice their opinions. Similarly, loyalty and voice are not positively related in the employment context. In Hirschman's original formulation, consumers with higher levels of loyalty are more likely to voice their preferences to the selling organization rather than stop buying a product or service (exit). However, employees who voice their concerns may be seen as disloyal or as a disruptive influence by managers leading loyal employees to remain silent. For this and other reasons, a concept of 'neglect' needs to supplement Hirschman's exit, voice, and loyalty framework within the employment context.). Alternatively, 'toleration' is sometimes applied to situations in which employees remain with the organization, aware of problems, yet do not voice concern or grievance.

Teacher unions negotiate for better wages and working conditions, but unions also provide a platform for “voice.” Choi and Chung found that the union-sponsored sense of voice was critical in the reduction of teacher turnover.

Middle managers may feel caught between two responsibilities, especially during periods of organizational change: the mandate to remain loyal and the mandate to voice concerns about changes that they are obliged to enforce. Gunnarsdóttir described a situation in which middle managers on welfare professions were able to maintain effective autonomy and their perceived sense of loyalty by dispersing opposing outlooks among the group.

O'Meara, Bennett & Neihaus discuss what might "pull" staff members away from their job, one example being better wages. They also discuss what might "push" them away from their job, one example being that they are unhappy with their current work circumstances. These faculty members are leaving for a number of reasons. Money and uncomfortable working circumstances are examples. Some might not be able to tolerate new leadership, or changes in the way they are expected to work. Saifullah & Shahida suggests that both professional respect and employer-employee relation influenced the employees' loyalty, but the effect of employer-employee was larger. Having a good relationship with employees has real reactions on their loyalty.

== Reception ==
Hirschman's book has been widely considered highly influential. Summarizing several criticisms of the book, Dowding writes that some scholars have argued that exit and voice can be used in unison (not solely as alternatives), that Hirschman does not pay attention to the ways collective action problems shape exit and voice choices, and that loyalty can also lead to silence rather than exit and voice.

In 2019, Professor Ian Shapiro of Yale University told a class of undergraduates, graduate students, and community members, "if you read no other book in the social sciences before you graduate, this is certainly one of the two or three books you should definitely read."

== Editions ==
- Albert O. Hirschman. 1970. Exit, Voice, and Loyalty: Responses to Decline in Firms, Organizations, and States. Cambridge, MA: Harvard University Press. ISBN 0-674-27660-4 (paper).

== See also ==
- Dollar voting
- Exit-Voice-Loyalty-Neglect Model
- Rational choice model
- Foot voting
- The Other Invisible Hand
- Why Nations Fail
- Entryism
