= Efficient contract theory =

Hypothesis in microeconomics

Efficient contract theory suggests that in a strong-form efficient market, if a contract exists, then it must be efficient due to survivorship bias.

For example, the initial public offering market in the United States has an underwriting spread of approximately 7% in the majority of cases despite some offerings being of differing size or difficulty. Some argue that this cannot reflect the true costs to the investment bank, as it does not account for economies of scale that the bank would no doubt benefit from for larger deals. Efficient contract theory would suggest that given the investment banking market is competitive and there is freedom of entry and exit, 7% must be an efficient contract otherwise it would not exist.

While the phrase "efficient contract" is in widespread use as a non-defined term, the defined-term as described above has only been used by Bruce Lyons in a paper from 1996.

== See also ==
- Contract theory
