= Hiding hand principle =

How ignorance intersects with rational choice to undertake a project

The hiding hand principle is a theory that offers a framework to examine how ignorance (particularly concerning future obstacles when a person first decides to take on a project) intersects with rational choice to undertake a project; the intersection is seen to provoke creative success over the obstacles through the deduction that it is too late to abandon the project. The term was coined by economist Albert O. Hirschman.

Writing in The New Yorker, Malcolm Gladwell brought the concept to life, retelling the story of the construction of a railway tunnel through Hoosac Mountain in northwestern Massachusetts. Construction proved much harder than anticipated, but eventually was completed, with positive results. Gladwell was reviewing the book, "Worldly Philosopher: The Odyssey of Albert O. Hirschman," by Jeremy Adelman.

== Description ==
Hirschman described the concept of the Hiding Hand principle in the second section of his essay "The Principle of the Hiding Hand" where he states:

We may be dealing here with a general principle of action. Creativity always comes as a surprise to us; therefore we can never count on it and we dare not believe in it until it has happened. In other words, we would not consciously engage upon tasks whose success clearly requires that creativity be forthcoming. Hence, the only way in which we can bring our creative resources fully into play is by misjudging the nature of the task, by presenting it to ourselves as more routine, simple, undemanding of genuine creativity than it will turn out to be. Or, put differently: since we necessarily underestimate our creativity it is desirable that we underestimate to a roughly similar extent the difficulties of the tasks we face, so as to be tricked by these two offsetting underestimates into undertaking tasks which we can, but otherwise would not dare, tackle. The principle is important enough to deserve a name: since we are apparently on the trail here of some sort of Invisible or Hidden Hand that beneficially hides difficulties from us, I propose "The Hiding Hand."

Recent empirical studies have challenged the validity of the Hiding Hand principle. Bent Flyvbjerg and Cass Sunstein coined the term "Malevolent Hiding Hand" to describe situations where costs and difficulties are underestimated, but no saving creativity emerges, leading to project failure.

== See also ==
- Planning fallacy – Cognitive bias of underestimating time needed
- Sunk cost fallacy – Cost that has already been incurred and cannot be recovered
