= Antebellum South =

Historical period in the Southern United States from 1815 to 1861

Antebellum Period in the Southern United States
- 1815–1861
War of 1812; Jeffersonian Era	American Civil War; Confederate States of America
- There were just over 3.2 million enslaved people in the U.S. in 1850, about 14% of the total population.
- Location: Southern United States
- Including: Era of Good Feelings; Jacksonian Era; Buildup to the Civil War
- President(s): James Madison; James Monroe; John Quincy Adams; Andrew Jackson; Martin Van Buren; William Henry Harrison; John Tyler; James K. Polk; Zachary Taylor; Millard Fillmore; Franklin Pierce; James Buchanan; Abraham Lincoln
- Key events: Adams–Onís Treaty; Missouri Compromise; Indian removal Trail of Tears; Manifest destiny Nullification crisis Mexican–American War; Treaty of Guadalupe Hidalgo; Compromise of 1850; Fugitive Slave Act; Bleeding Kansas; Election of Lincoln

The Antebellum South era (from Latin: ante bellum, lit. 'before the war') was a period in the history of the Southern United States that extended from the conclusion of the War of 1812 to the start of the American Civil War in 1861. This era was marked by the prevalent practice of human chattel slavery and the associated societal norms it cultivated. Over the course of this period, Southern leaders underwent a transformation in their perspective on slavery. Initially regarded as an awkward and temporary institution, it gradually evolved into a defended concept, with proponents arguing for its positive merits, while simultaneously vehemently opposing the burgeoning abolitionist movement.

Southern society was stratified, inegalitarian, and perceived by immigrants as lacking in opportunities. Consequently, the manufacturing base lagged behind that of the non-slave states. Wealth inequality grew as the larger landholders took the greater share of the profits generated by enslaved persons, which also helped to entrench their power as a political class.

As the country expanded westward, slavery's propagation became a major issue in national politics, eventually boiling over into the Civil War. In the years that followed the Civil War, the war was romanticized by historical negationists to protect three central assertions: that the Confederate cause was heroic, that enslaved people were happy and satisfied, and that slavery was not the primary cause of the war. This phenomenon has continued to the present day to contribute to racism, gender roles, and religious attitudes in the South, and to a lesser extent in the rest of the United States.

== History ==
In the 18th century, the Atlantic slave trade brought enslaved Africans to the South during the colonial period as a source of labor for the harvesting of crops. There were almost 700,000 enslaved persons in the U.S. in 1790, which was approximately 18 percent of the total population or roughly one in six people. By the end of the 18th century, slavery was in decline, with states in the North beginning to ban the institution and planters in the South realizing that they had no crops successful enough to make slavery financially viable. This would change with the invention of the cotton gin by Eli Whitney in the mid-1790s, which changed a once-tedious manual cleaning and fiber separation process into a faster, less labor-intensive procedure. Suddenly, cotton could be processed more inexpensively and efficiently, resulting in slavery becoming very profitable and a large plantation system developing to support the expanding industry. In the 15 years between the invention of the cotton gin and the passage of the Act Prohibiting Importation of Slaves, the slave trade increased and slavery became more prevalent in the southern United States.

== Economic structure ==
The Antebellum South saw large expansions in agriculture during the early 19th century, spurred on by increased demand for cotton for the new textile factories of the industrial North. In light of the successful cotton industry, anti-industrial and anti-urban attitudes resulting from a belief that agrarian life would continue to be the best way forward, the Southern economy experienced little industrialization or other manufacturing development. The Southern economy was characterized by a low level of capital accumulation (largely slave-labor-based) and a shortage of liquid capital, which led to a South dependent on export trade. This was in contrast to the North and West, which relied on their own domestic markets. Since the Southern domestic market consisted primarily of plantations focused on a few specific crops, Southern states imported sustenance commodities from the West and manufactured goods from England and the North.

The plantation system can be seen as the factory system applied to agriculture, with a concentration of labor under skilled management. But while the industrial manufacturing-based labor economy of the North was driven by growing demand, maintenance of the plantation economic system depended upon slave labor, which was abundant and inexpensive.

The five major commodities of the Southern agricultural economy were cotton, grain, tobacco, sugar, and rice, with cotton the leading cash crop. These commodities were concentrated in the Deep South (Georgia, Mississippi, Alabama, and Louisiana).

=== Inefficiency of slave-based agriculture ===
The leading historian of the era was Ulrich Bonnell Phillips, who studied slavery not so much as a political issue between North and South, but as a social and economic system. He focused on the large plantations that dominated the South.

Phillips addressed the unprofitability of slave labor and slavery's ill effects on the Southern economy. An example of pioneering comparative work was A Jamaica Slave Plantation (1914). His methods inspired the "Phillips school" of slavery studies, between 1900 and 1950.

Phillips argued that large-scale plantation slavery was inefficient and not progressive. It had reached its geographical limits by 1860 or so, and therefore eventually had to fade away (as happened in Brazil). In The Decadence of the Plantation System (1910), he argued that slavery was an unprofitable relic that persisted because it produced social status, honor, and political power. "Most farmers in the South had small-to-medium-sized farms with few slaves, but the large plantation owner's wealth, often reflected in the number of slaves they owned, afforded them considerable prestige and political power."

Phillips contended that masters treated enslaved persons relatively well; his views on that issue were later sharply rejected by Kenneth M. Stampp. His conclusions about the economic decline of slavery were challenged in 1958 by Alfred H. Conrad and John R. Meyer in a landmark study published in the Journal of Political Economy. Their arguments were further developed by Robert Fogel and Stanley L. Engerman, who argued in their 1974 book, Time on the Cross, that slavery was both efficient and profitable, as long as the price of cotton was high enough. In turn, Fogel and Engerman came under attack from other historians of slavery.

=== Effects of economy on social structure ===
As slavery began to displace indentured servitude as the principal supply of labor in the plantation systems of the South, the economic nature of the institution of slavery aided in the increased inequality of wealth seen in the Antebellum South. The demand for slave labor and the U.S. ban on importing more slaves from Africa drove up prices for slaves, making it profitable for smaller farms in older settled areas such as Virginia to sell their slaves further south and west. The actuarial risk, or the potential loss in investment of owning slaves from death, disability, etc. was much greater for small plantation owners. Accentuated by the rise in price of slaves seen just prior to the Civil War, the overall costs associated with owning slaves to the individual plantation owner led to the concentration of slave ownership seen at the eve of the Civil War.

== Social structure ==
Much of the Antebellum South was rural, and in line with the plantation system, largely agricultural. With the exception of New Orleans, Louisiana, Charleston, South Carolina, Richmond, Virginia, and Louisville, Kentucky the slave states had no large cities, and the urban population of the South could not compare to that of the Northeast, or even that of the agrarian West. This led to a sharp division in class in the southern states, between the landowning "master" class, yeoman farmers, poor whites, and slaves; while in the northern and western states, much of the social spectrum was dominated by a wide range of different laboring classes.

=== Wealth inequality ===
The conclusion that, while both the North and the South were characterized by a high degree of inequality during the plantation era, the wealth distribution was much more unequal in the South than in the North arises from studies concerned with the equality of land, slave, and wealth distribution. For example, in certain states and counties, due to the concentration of landholding and slave holding, which were highly correlated, six percent of landowners eventually commanding one-third of the gross income and an even higher portion of the net income. The majority of landowners, who had smaller scale plantations, saw a disproportionately small portion in revenues generated by the slavery-driven plantation system.

=== Effects of social structure on economy ===
While the two largest classes in the South included land- and slave-owners and slaves, various strata of social classes existed within and between the two. In examining class relations and the banking system in the South, the economic exploitation of slave labor can be seen to arise from a need to maintain certain conditions for the existence of slavery and from a need for each of the remaining social strata to remain in status quo. In order to meet conditions where slavery may continue to exist, members of the master class (e.g., white, landowning, slave-owning) had to compete with other members of the master class to maximize the surplus labor extracted from slaves. Likewise, in order to remain within the same class, members of the master class (and each subsumed class below) must expand their claim on revenues derived from the slave labor surplus.

== Mercantilist underpinnings ==
Mercantilist ideologies largely explain the rise of the plantation system in the United States. In the 16th and 17th centuries under mercantilism, rulers of nations believed that the accumulation of wealth through a favorable balance of trade was the best way to ensure power. As a result, several European nations began to colonize the Americas to take advantage of rich natural resources and encourage exports.

One example of England using its American colonies for economic gain was tobacco. When tobacco was first discovered as a recreational substance, there was a widespread social backlash in England, spearheaded by King James I. By the middle of the 17th century, however, Parliament had realized the revenue potential of tobacco and quickly changed its official moral stance towards its use. As a result, tobacco plantations sprung up across the American South in large numbers to support demand in Europe. By 1670, more than half of all tobacco shipped to England was being re-exported to other countries throughout Europe at a premium. In similar ways, the English were able to profit from other American staple crops, such as cotton, rice, and indigo, which "fueled the expansion of the American plantation colonies, transformed the Atlantic into an English inland sea, and led to the creation of the first British Empire."

Many claim that being a part of the British mercantilist system was in the best economic interest of the American colonies, as they would not have been able to survive as independent economic entities. Robert Haywood, in his article "Mercantilism and South Carolina Agriculture, 1700–1763", argues that "it was unthinkable that any trade could prosper in the straight-jacket of regimented and restricted international trade, without the guiding hand of a powerful protecting government."

== Adverse economic effects ==
The plantation system created an environment for the South to experience an economic boom in the 17th, 18th and early 19th centuries. However, reliance both on the plantation system and on the more widespread slave labor left the South in a precarious economic situation. This was the subject of the highly influential 1857 book The Impending Crisis of the South: How to Meet It, by Hinton Rowan Helper. Following the end of the Civil War, and into the Reconstruction era (1865–77), the South experienced economic devastation; some states that relied less heavily on the plantation system managed to fare better following its downfall. Ulrich Bonnell Phillips contends that the plantation "sadly restricted the opportunity of such men as [they] were of better industrial quality than was required for the field gangs". Essentially, men who would have been otherwise capable of performing other skilled jobs were nonetheless relegated to fieldwork because of the nature of the system.

A 1984 journal article by Claudia Goldin and Kenneth Sokoloff suggested that the South misallocated labor compared to the North, which more eagerly embraced woman- and child-labor in its factories to push industrialization forward, because their relative value to Northern agriculture was lesser than in Southern agriculture.

While the South still attracted immigrants from Europe, the North attracted far more during the early to mid-19th century, such that, by the time of the Civil War, the population of the North far exceeded the non-enslaved population of the South per the 1860 census. Colin Woodard argued in his 2011 book American Nations that the South was relatively less successful in attracting immigrants due to the South's reputation as a more stratified and agrarian society. Striving immigrants who sought economic advancement thus tended to favor the more developed and more egalitarian North, whereas the South was oft-perceived as being more aristocratic and consequently as providing fewer advancement opportunities for all.

== See also ==
- Confederate States of America
- Reconstruction era
- Deep South
- Old South, the pre-Civil War economy and society of the Southern U.S.
- New South, the post-Reconstruction era economy and society of the Southern U.S.
