= Big push model =

Concept of development economics or welfare economics

The Big Push Model is a concept in development economics or welfare economics that emphasizes the fact that a firm's decision whether to industrialize or not depends on the expectation of what other firms will do. It assumes economies of scale and oligopolistic market structure. It also explains when the industrialization would happen.

The major contributions to the concept of the Big Push were made by Paul Rosenstein-Rodan in 1943 and later on by Murphy, Shleifer and Vishny in 1989. Also, some contributions of Matsuyama (1992), Krugman (1991) and Romer (1986) proved to be seminal for later literature on the Big Push.

Analysis of this economic model usually involves using game theory.

The hallmark of the ‘big-push’ approach lies in the reaping of external economies through the simultaneous installation of a host of technically interdependent industries. But before that could become possible, we have to overcome the economic indivisibilities by moving forward by a certain “minimum indivisible step”. This can be realised through the injection of an initial big dose of a certain size of investment.

== See also ==
- Rostow's stages of growth
- Ragnar Nurkse
- Ragnar Nurkse's balanced growth theory
- Virtuous circle and vicious circle
- Strategy of unbalanced growth
- Dual economy
