= Rostow's stages of growth =

Historical model of economic growth

The Rostovian take-off model (also called "Rostow's Stages of Growth") is one of the major historical models of economic growth based on Auguste Comte's earlier "law of three stages." It was postulated by W. W. Rostow in his book The Stages of Economic Growth: A Non-Communist Manifesto (1960). The model postulates that economic modernization occurs in five basic stages, of varying length.

1. Traditional society
2. Preconditions for take-off
3. Take-off
4. Drive to maturity
5. Age of High mass consumption

Rostow asserts that countries go through each of these stages fairly linearly, and set out a number of conditions that were likely to occur in investment, consumption and social trends at each stage. Not all of the conditions were certain to occur at each stage, however, and the stages and transition periods may occur at varying lengths from country to country, and even from region to region.

Rostow's model is one of the more structuralist models of economic growth, particularly in comparison with the 'backwardness' model developed by Alexander Gerschenkron. The two models are not necessarily mutually exclusive, however, and many countries seem to follow both models rather adequately.

Beyond the structured picture of growth itself, another important part of the model is that economic take-off must initially be led by a few individual sectors. This belief echoes David Ricardo’s comparative advantage thesis and criticizes Marxist revolutionaries push for economic self-reliance in that it pushes for the 'initial' development of only one or two sectors over the development of all sectors equally. This became one of the important concepts in the theory of modernization in the social evolutionism.

== Theoretical framework ==
Rostow's model is descendent from the liberal school of economics, emphasizing the efficacy of modern concepts of free trade and the ideas of Adam Smith. It also denies Friedrich List’s argument that countries reliant on exporting raw materials may get “locked in”, and be unable to diversify, in that Rostow's model states that countries may need to depend on a few raw material exports to finance the development of manufacturing sectors which are not yet of superior competitiveness in the early stages of take-off. In that way, Rostow's model does not deny John Maynard Keynes in that it allows for a degree of government control over domestic development not generally accepted by some ardent free trade advocates. Although empirical at times, Rostow is hardly free of normative discourse. As a basic assumption, Rostow believes that countries want to modernize as he describes modernization, and that society will assent to the materialistic norms of economic growth.

== Stages ==
=== Traditional Societies ===
Traditional societies are marked by their pre-Newtonian understanding and use of technology. These are societies which have pre-scientific understandings of gadgets, agriculture is predominant and society has a hierarchical structure. The norms of economic growth are completely absent from these societies. The society has a low ceiling on per capita output because of the backwardness of the technology. Agriculture is the main source of income.

=== Preconditions to Take-off ===
The preconditions to take-off according to Rostow, refers to that the society begins committing itself to secular education, that it enables a degree of capital mobilization, especially through the establishment of banks and currency, that an entrepreneurial class forms, and that the secular concept of manufacturing develops, with only a few sectors developing at this point. This leads to a take-off in ten to fifty years. At this stage, there is a limited production function, and therefore a limited output.

=== Take-off ===
Take-off then occurs when sector led growth becomes common and society is driven more by economic processes than traditions. At this point, the norms of economic growth are well established. In discussing the take-off, Rostow is a noted early adopter of the term “transition”, which is to describe the passage of a traditional to a modern economy. After take-off, a country will take as long as fifty to one hundred years to reach maturity. Globally, this stage occurred during the Industrial Revolution in economic development.

==== Conditions for Take-off ====
The requirements of take-off are the following two related but necessary conditions:

1. A rise in the rate of productive investment from approximately 10% or less to over 20% of national income or net national product;
2. The development of one or more substantial manufacturing sectors with a high rate of growth; he indicates the leading sectors in the economy. Rostow regards the development of leading sectors as the 'analytical bone structure' of the stages of economic growth. There are generally three sectors of an economy:
1. Primary Sector - Agriculture
2. Secondary Sector - Manufacturing
3. Tertiary Sector - Services

=== Drive to Maturity ===
After take-off, there follows a long interval of sustained, if fluctuating, progress, as the now regularly growing economy drives to extend modern technology over the whole front of its economic activity. Some 10-20% of the national income is steadily invested, permitting output regularly to outstrip the increase in population. The makeup of the economy changes unceasingly as technique improves, new industries accelerate, and older industries level off. The economy finds its place in the international economy: goods formerly imported are produced at home; new import requirements develop, and new export commodities match them. Society makes such terms as it will with the requirements of modern efficient production, balancing off the new against the older values and institutions, or revising the latter in such ways as to support rather than to retard the growth process. The drive to maturity refers to the need for the economy to diversify. The sectors of the economy which lead initially begin to level off, while other sectors begin to take off. This diversity leads to greatly reduced rates of poverty and rising standards of living, as a society no longer needs to sacrifice its comfort in order to strengthen certain sectors.

=== Age of High Mass Consumption ===
The age of high mass consumption refers to the period of contemporary comfort afforded many western nations, wherein consumers concentrate on durable goods, and hardly remember the subsistence concerns of previous stages. Rostow uses the Buddenbrooks dynamics metaphor to describe this change in attitude. In Thomas Mann’s novel Buddenbrooks, a family is chronicled for three generations. The first generation is interested in economic development, the second in its position in society. The third, already having money and prestige, concerns itself with the arts and music, worrying little about those previous, earthly concerns. So too, in the age of high mass consumption, a society is able to choose between concentrating on military and security issues, on equality and welfare issues, or on developing great luxuries for its upper class. Each country in this position chooses its own balance between these three goals.

Of particular note is the fact that Rostow's "Age of High Mass Consumption" dovetails with (occurring before) Daniel Bell's hypothesized "Post-Industrial Society." The Bell and Rostovian models collectively suggest that economic maturation inevitably brings on job-growth which can be followed by wage escalation in the secondary economic sector (manufacturing), which is then followed by dramatic growth in the tertiary economic sector (commerce and services). In the Bell model, the tertiary economic sector rises to predominance, encompassing perhaps 65 to 75 percent of the employment in a given economy. Maturation can then bring-on deindustrialization as manufacturers reorient to cheaper labor markets, and deindustrialization can, in turn, destabilize the tertiary sector. The suggestion is that mature economies may implicitly destabilize and cycle back-and-forth between the final stages of the Rostovian-Bell developmental phases as they rebalance themselves, over time, and re-evolve their economic base.

== Criticism of the model ==
1: Rostow is historical in the sense that the result is known at the outset and is derived from the historical geography of a developed, bureaucratic society.

2: Rostow is mechanical in the sense that the underlying motor of change is not disclosed and therefore the stages become little more than a classificatory system based on data from developed countries.

3: His model is based on American and European history and defines the American norm of high mass consumption as integral to the economic development process of all industrialized societies.

4: His model assumes the inevitable adoption of Neoliberal trade policies which allow the manufacturing base of a given advanced polity to be relocated to lower-wage regions.

Rostow's thesis is biased towards a western model of modernization, but at the time of Rostow the world's only mature economies were in the west, and no controlled economies were in the "era of high mass consumption." The model de-emphasizes differences between sectors in capitalistic vs. communistic societies, but seems to innately recognize that modernization can be achieved in different ways in different types of economies.

The most disabling assumption that Rostow is accused of is trying to fit economic progress into a linear system. This charge is correct in that many countries make false starts, reach a degree of transition and then slip back, or as is the case in contemporary Russia, slip back from high mass consumption (or almost) to a country in transition. On the other hand, Rostow's analysis seems to emphasize success because it is trying to explain success. To Rostow, if a country can be a disciplined, uncorrupt investor in itself, can establish certain norms into its society and polity, and can identify sectors where it has some sort of advantage, it can enter into transition and eventually reach modernity. Rostow would point to a failure in one of these conditions as a cause for non-linearity.

Another problem that Rostow's work has is that it considers mostly large countries: countries with a large population (Japan), with natural resources available at just the right time in its history (Coal in Northern European countries), or with a large land mass (Argentina). He has little to say and indeed offers little hope for small countries, such as Rwanda, which do not have such advantages. Neo-liberal economic theory to Rostow, and many others, does offer hope to much of the world that economic maturity is coming and the age of high mass consumption is nigh. But that does leave a sort of 'grim meathook future' for the outliers, which do not have the resources, political will, or external backing to become competitive. (See Dependency theory)

== See also ==
- Development economics
- Ragnar Nurkse
- Virtuous circle and vicious circle
- Strategy of unbalanced growth
- Dual economy
- Big push model
