= Rumbi Nature Reserve =

Protected area in Estonia

- Location within Estonia
- Location: Estonia
- Coordinates: 58°53′N 25°11′E
- Area: 72 ha (180 acres)
- Established: 2001 (2009)

Rumbi Nature Reserve is a nature reserve which is located in Järva County, Estonia.

The area of the nature reserve is 72 ha.

The protected area was founded in 2001 to protect valuable habitat types and threatened species in former Käru Parish.
