= Kullimaa =

Kullimaa may refer to several places in Estonia:

- Kullimaa, Järva County, village in Türi Parish, Järva County
- Kullimaa, Pärnu County, village in Põhja-Pärnumaa Parish, Pärnu County
