= Backwardness brings on beatings by others =

SHETH P T COLLEGE STUDENT

- Initiator: Joseph Stalin
- Origin: On the Tasks of Economic Workers
- Introduced: February 4, 1931

Backwardness brings on beatings by others
- Simplified Chinese: 落后就要挨打
- Traditional Chinese: 落後就要挨打
Transcriptions
Standard Mandarin
- Hanyu Pinyin: Luòhòu jiù yào āidǎ

Backwardness brings on beatings by others (simplified Chinese: 落后就要挨打; traditional Chinese: 落後就要挨打), or the backward will be beaten up, backwardness proves vulnerable to attack, is a viewpoint put forward by Joseph Stalin. This claim attributes China's beating to its technological backwardness. It is a slogan used by the Chinese government to guide Chinese people to understand modern Chinese history.

== Definition ==
"Backwardness brings on beatings by others" literally means that if you are backward, you will be beaten. This phrase is mostly for countries, it implies that backward countries are naturally subject to invasion and exploitation.. Stalin initially puts forward this idea in his speech On the Tasks of Economic Workers, delivered on February 4, 1931:

To slacken the tempo would mean falling behind. And those who fall behind get beaten. But we do not want to be beaten. No, we refuse to be beaten! One feature of the history of old Russia was the continual beatings she suffered because of her backwardness. […] They beat her because it was profitable and could be done with impunity. […] Such is the law of the exploiters — to beat the backward and the weak. It is the jungle law of capitalism. You are backward, you are weak — therefore you are wrong; hence you can be beaten and enslaved. You are mighty — therefore you are right; hence we must be wary of you.

== Evaluations ==
Some Chinese scholars have questioned the statement that "backwardness brings on beatings by others". Zhu Weizheng argued that the backwardness of political civilization was the fundamental reason why the late Qing China was beaten by the Western powers. According to Hu Haiou, the real reason why the late Qing China was beaten was because of its backward concept.
