= Piiumetsa Landscape Conservation Area =

Protected area in Estonia

- Location within Estonia
- Location: Estonia
- Coordinates: 58°54′N 25°15′E
- Area: 1,136 ha (2,810 acres)
- Established: 1981 (2006)

Piiumetsa Landscape Conservation Area is a nature park which is located in Järva County, Estonia.

The area of the nature park is 1136 ha.

The protected area was founded in 1981 on the basis of Piiumetsa Wetland Protection Area (Estonian: Piiumetsa sookaitseala). Under protection are wetland areas in Kaiu and Käru Parish. In 2006, the protected area was designated to the landscape conservation area.
