= Gerschenkron effect =

The Gerschenkron effect, developed by Alexander Gerschenkron, claims that changing the base year for an index determines the growth rate of the index. This effect is applicable only to aggregation method using reference price structure (meaning, each country's quantities are valued by uniform set of prices to obtain volume) or reference volume structure (meaning, obtaining Purchasing power parity via valuation of uniform set of quantities by each country's price). However, if production is measured by "real" tearms, this effect does not exist.

This description is from the OECD website:

The Gerschenkron effect can arise with aggregation methods that use either a reference price structure or a reference volume structure to compare countries. For methods employing a reference price structure, a country's share of total GDP (that is the total for the group of countries being compared) will rise as the reference price structure becomes less characteristic of its own price structure. For methods employing a reference volume structure, a country's share of total GDP will fall as the reference volume structure becomes less characteristic of its own volume structure. The Gerschenkron effect arises because of the negative correlation between prices and volumes. In other words, expenditure patterns change in response to changes in relative prices because consumers switch their expenditure towards relatively cheap products.

Simply, put the “Gerschenkron effect” measures the difference between Paasche and Laspeyres indices. That means that “early-weighted” aggregate will grow faster than “late-weighted.” Negative correlation is due to relatively rapid technical progress and falling relative price benefit from cost-reducing substitution. Or it can be vice versa; slow technical progress, increasing relative price suffer from cost-reducing substitution. In other words, this effect arises when activities whose relative prices are falling tend to increase their volume shares of total production and vice versa. Which is exactly what happened during industrial revolution when manufacturing expanded is produced volume.

After revision by Jonas and Sardy in 1970, properties of the Gerschenkron effect were further developed. In addition to originally stated upward bias of base-year indices and reasoning behind that, it was shown that the movement in relative quantities is usually larger than the movement in relative prices and that the weighted correlation of those effects decreases over time with further development.

== History ==
What is now called the “Gerschenkron effect” have first appeared in 1947 and was further explained and used in a study A Dollar Index of Soviet Machinery Output in 1951 by Alexander Gerschenkron. Using actual data of United States machinery output in different years, it, empirically, showed that the substantial economic growth of the Soviet Union was due to index number bias; a Laspeyres index calculated on basis of 1926-27 had overstated the real expansion. It was shown for an industrial production index, however, it would be the same for price indices with differently weighted volume indices. That finding proved Soviet economic growth in the first half of 20th century to be subject to inappropriate technique, rather than false statistics. Which had a great political importance at that time as it deflated the economic growth of the biggest communist economy at that time.

The “Gerschenkron effect” can be observed throughout the history. It is, however, connected with technological growth; e.g. industrial revolution. Because of tremendous technological development, thus, disproportional change in prices for different goods, the “Gerschenkron effect” has become even more pronounced in the second half of 20th century. Meaning, that the true economic growth was massively overstated if older prices were taken as base of the index. Therefore, both cross-country and cross-time comparisons has become rather challenging. Considering concurrent economic growth, especially of high-tech companies, the challenge will become greater. According to Gerschenkron, a country that experiences the industrialization process late progresses faster than the countries that industrialize early when it makes its industrialization move. The success and thus the speed of late industrialized countries have been possible with the use of modern technology. The late industrialized countries, which had the chance to compete with the early industrializing countries through modern technology and managed to have a large share in the world markets, adopted a strategy of concentrating on industries where technology is important in order to reach these countries. For example; In the second half of the 19th century, the technologies used in heavy industries in Russia and Germany developed rapidly and as the developing technology required large-scale enterprises, the scale of the factories in these countries also increased. Alexander Gerschenkron emphasized that the later a country industrializes, the larger the factory scale and capital-output ratio required.

However, although more advanced technology means larger-scale factories, Gerschenkron points out that large-scale factories will often create problems. According to him, productivity in large-scale enterprises is low. It also highlights that in Russia, which lacks administrative and technical skills, the problem of finding the necessary qualified labor force to be employed in large-scale enterprises is increasing. In his thesis, Gerschenkron also mentions the problems faced by late industrializing Russia. For example; he argued that there are sharp differences between developed industrial regions and backward agricultural regions in Russia. While heavy taxes collected from the peasants inevitably included the Russian villagers in the economic development policies, from time to time the weight of the tax obligations put the villagers in a difficult situation. Gerschenkron's Late Industrializing Countries Thesis focuses on explaining why countries industrialize late. In the industrialization process, Gerschenkron divided the role of the state into two: the state, which directly promotes industrialization and strives to create a suitable framework for industrial development, and the state, which confronts the economy as an obstacle to industrial growth. Emphasizing that the role of the state is effective, especially in underdeveloped countries, Gerschenkron emphasized in his thesis that the state generally assumes the role of promoting the industrialization process and cited Russia as the most appropriate example. However, Gerschenkron's thesis also tries to explain why the financial structures of countries are different from each other. According to Gerschenkron, the more capital a country needs in the short run, the more unfair the market mechanism will be in allocating financial capital in the long run. For this reason, banks and the state undertake this task, especially in late industrializing countries with underdeveloped capital markets. Because capital mobility is a feature that must be provided in the industrialization process. In countries where there is no capital market, investors, savers and lending institutions direct their capital to a few sectors or even a few enterprises. Therefore, the capital in the hands of the savers is not invested in economically productive areas and cannot be directed to different areas.

Specifically, for the example above, the Soviet Union to U. S. GDP ratio measured in U. S. prices will always be higher than if measured at Soviet prices and vice versa for U. S. to Soviet Union GDP ratio. Thus, it makes a loophole to be used for successful propaganda on both sides of the battlefield (e.g. during Cold War). However, for cross-time, within country, comparisons in centrally planned economic systems (e. g. in the Soviet Union), ), the “Gerschenkron effect” is practically non-existent since prices are heavily distorted to provide an optimal resource allocation. But it can still be observed while comparing two different economies.

== Concerns ==
From economics perspective, however, the “Gerschenkron effect” is said to be only a bad measurement, instead of aggregation or “index-number” problem. Since it is more appropriate to measure economic growth rate by “real terms” while comparing different countries. Thus, it eliminates problems connected with inflation, such as the “Gerschenkron effect.” However, most effect on the bias, thus, Gerschenkron effect, have early changes in the specific example examined by Alexander Gerschenkron.

There is not one opinion when the “Gerschenkron effect” should be used or even whether it is even working. According to Larsen and Nilson, the “Gerschenkron effect” should be considered only in period of transitioning from handcrafting to mechanized industries. However, Jonas Ljunberg argues that it can be generalized since structural change is characterized by disproportional change in prices of different goods and/or capacities of various production. Therefore, “Gerschenkron effect” is pronounced in either industrial development or total commodity production.

It is also argued that the time period examined by Alexander Gerschenkron made this effect more pronounced than different would. It was due to a special conditions in the United States of America. If the time period would be extended to the beginning of the Second World War, i.e. 1939, the effect of growth would be reversed due to a depression. Because of artificial maintaining of prices of highly fabricated goods due to output restriction. On the other hand, output of simple goods was still relatively high, however, the prices fell down.

== Applications ==
The “Gerschenkron effect” is often used to test relative rates of technical change; simply said, “early-weighted” indices of production are “upward-biased” (overstating the true economic growth rate) and “late-weighted” indices of production are “downward-biased.”

The “Gerschenkron effect” can be used for either long-term or short-term analysis and at various levels of economy. (Even though, it was not hugely pronounced in period from 1860s to 1970s due to rapid increase in relative prices and usual technological development which leads to change in relative quantity of goods produced). According to Alexander Gerschenkron himself, the classification of countries can be done by dividing the countries by using such analysis. While countries such as England, France and Switzerland, where the necessary conditions for industrial growth exist and these conditions accelerate industrialization by taking action especially with the free market mechanism, are considered as early industrializing countries by Gerschenkron; Countries such as Russia, Germany and Japan, where non-existing necessary conditions are replaced by systematic elements and which resort to state intervention with the desire to catch up with the early industrializing countries, are classified as late industrializing countries by Gerschenkron.

This effect was shown to be the major factor in overstating economic growth of Soviet Union in 20th century and in the development of Sweden's commodity production from the period of break-through to the high tide of industrialism. We can observe that the main period of transformation was in two decades at the beginning of 20th century and then again during 1940s.

It was mentioned that there is possibility to indicate the speed of the economic development in a society by the number bias of the index. Which is a product of the Gerschenkron effect. However, it could add to an unbalanced industrialization period. It is because of the quantity relatives dominates, thus, Laspeyres quantity index goes up.

== Different methodology ==
Different method of examining growth over time could be comparing Paasche price index with annual quantity weight with Laspeyres price index with constant quantity weights from the start of the period. If there was an economic transformation, it would lead to fall of relative prices of new goods and its increasing share of the aggregate output. That would lead to lower values provided by PPI than LPI. Because while weights in LPI remain constant, in PPI relatively cheaper goods get increasing weight. According to Gerschenkron, this leads to “annoying index problem.” However, we can take ratio of PPI/LPI which has been labelled Gerschenkron effect. The more it decreases, the more economic transformation took place.

Therefore, we can have two sorts of transformations: positive and negative. Corresponding to Schumpeter's “creative destruction:” meaning that new industries expand at the expense of the older ones which are falling behind.

== Weak and Strong Gerschenkron effect ==
The “Gerschenkron effect” is further distinguished to weak and strong “Gerschenkron effect,” demonstrated on a topic of economic integration (in Central and Eastern European countries). Observing higher productivity growth in industry contemporaneous output gap is the weak “Gerschenkron effect.” Which propel economic convergence, however, that occurs only in theoretical perspective in which the aggregate level is taken in account. On the other hand, if disaggregated (industrial) level is considered, that effect has important implication for the dynamics of comparative advantage. If the catching-up parameter is higher in the industry with higher productivity gap, it is called the strong “Gerschenkron effect”.

One area where the Gerschenkron effect has been applied is in the study of technological catch-up in developing countries. Specifically, it has been observed that countries with low levels of technological development can achieve faster rates of growth by adopting technologies that are already available in developed countries, rather than attempting to create new technologies from scratch. This strategy is known as "technology transfer," and it has been shown to be particularly effective in industries that have relatively low levels of technological sophistication, such as agriculture, textiles, and light manufacturing.

Another factor that can influence the strength of the Gerschenkron effect is the degree of competition within an industry. In highly competitive industries, firms may be forced to innovate in order to maintain their market share, even if they are relatively technologically backward. This can limit the extent to which catch-up can occur through technology transfer alone.

Furthermore, recent research has shown that the Gerschenkron effect can also be influenced by factors such as the quality of institutions and the level of human capital in a country. In particular, countries with strong institutions and high levels of education tend to be better able to take advantage of technology transfer opportunities and achieve faster rates of catch-up.

In summary, the Gerschenkron effect is a useful concept for understanding the dynamics of technological catch-up in developing countries, particularly in industries with low levels of technological sophistication. However, the strength of the effect can be influenced by factors such as competition, institutions, and human capital, and it may not hold uniformly across all industries and countries.

== Post WWII Gershenkron effect ==
=== Germany ===
==== Industrial Development ====
Investment in producing facilities and equipment was a major role in Germany's postwar economic development. The country's infrastructure was destroyed during the war, but the government invested substantially in reconstructing and developing infrastructure such as roads, trains, and communication networks. This aided in the development of a more efficient transportation and communication infrastructure, facilitating the movement of products and services across the country and around the world. Furthermore, investment in productive facilities and equipment laid the groundwork for the expansion of Germany industry. The government supported investment in new and creative technologies and procedures, which aided in increasing manufacturing productivity and efficiency. This investment was also crucial in the growth of the country's automobile sector, which has contributed significantly to Germany's economic success. The German government aided the expansion of corporations such as BMW, Mercedes-Benz, and Volkswagen, which became global brands and contributed to Germany's economic success.

The German government encouraged collaboration among industry, academia, and government by establishing technology and innovation centers such as the Fraunhofer Society, which played an important role in developing and commercializing's new technologies. The government also aided the growth of small and medium-sized businesses by providing subsidies and advising services, allowing these businesses to innovate and compete on a global scale.

==== Human Capital ====
The emphasis on human capital development was another important aspect in Germany's postwar economic progress. The German government spent substantially in education and vocational training programs to provide its workers with the skills and knowledge needed to operate and maintain the new industrial equipment and technologies that were introduced. Germany was able to build a highly trained workforce capable of adjusting to shifting technical breakthroughs and contributing to the country's economic prosperity as a result of its emphasis on education and training. Germany's postwar economic success may be credited to its inventive and dynamic corporate culture, in addition to investments in infrastructure and human capital development. German enterprises were quick to adapt new technologies and manufacturing processes, and they placed a significant emphasis on R&D, allowing them to remain ahead of competitors in the worldwide market. A stable political climate and a supportive legislative framework that promoted company development and investment aided this culture of innovation and entrepreneurship.

The founding of the European Union and the construction of the single market were important factors in Germany's postwar economic success. The common market encouraged the free flow of products, services, and capital across borders, facilitating trade and investment and providing German enterprises with access to a bigger market. This enhanced competitiveness, which fostered more innovation and efficiency benefits in the German economy. The combination of infrastructural investment, a supportive government, and a highly qualified workforce allowed Germany to achieve fast post-war economic expansion, eventually becoming one of the world's top economies. Germany is still a highly industrialised country with a strong emphasis on innovation and technology, and its success demonstrates the value of investing in critical economic variables such as infrastructure, human capital, and supporting government policies.

=== Japan ===
==== Industrial Development ====
Before and during the second World War, the industrial development in Japan was relatively low compared to other global economies. After the war, Japan was able to catch up or surpass globally advanced economies, such as in Europe or North America, experiencing the "Gerschenkron Effect". This occurred due to rates of investments into productive plants, equipment, education, infrastructure and adoption of technologies and techniques from other countries, such as the United States. These included electronics such as Sony and Panasonic, automobile manufacturing such as Toyota and Honda, robotic such as Fanuc and Yaskawa and oxygen furnace steel production. The adopted technologies and techniques were a key factor for the rapid industrial development after the second World War. The contribution of technologies helped Japan become a global economic power during the 1960s to the 1980s. The comparative advantage Japan gained allowed them to compete on global markets.

==== Contributing Government ====
The Japanese government was critical in fostering industrial development. By enacting different laws to assist industries and promote investments in productive facilities, equipment, and R&D. The Ministry of International Trade and Industry not only offered leadership and financial support to industries, but it also established objectives while assisting company coordination. The government's massive investment in productive initiatives was another aspect. One example of government action is the development of industrial clusters, such as the Keihin Industrial Zone in Tokyo, which brought together a concentration of firms in one place. Through company collaboration, this enabled effective resource sharing and promoted technical innovation. Furthermore, the government aided in the transfer of technology and processes from the United States, helping Japanese firms to expand swiftly and become globally competitive. The government also supported in the development of new technologies and industries, helping Japan to maintain its competitive advantage.

==== Financial Systems ====
Particularly after World War II, Japan's banking sector was essential to the country's industrial growth. The Japanese government created policies that promoted bank expansion and offered loans to help the growth of the industrial sector. Following the devastation of the war, these policies aimed to encourage economic growth and job creation. The establishment of the Ministry of Finance in 1949 was one of the important initiatives that aided Japan's financial system. The ministry was in charge of monitoring Japan's financial system and was instrumental in creating policies that aided industrial development. It collaborated closely with the Bank of Japan, which was in charge of monetary policy and safeguarding the country's financial stability. The "main bank" system was a distinctive approach to lending used by Japanese banks. Each corporation had a "main bank" that provided long-term funding and had a role in directing the company's strategic direction under this arrangement. This approach aided in the development of strong ties between banks and businesses, as well as the financial system's stability and continuity. The Japanese government also instituted regulations to promote the expansion of the stock market, which offered a new source of funding for businesses. The Tokyo Stock Exchange was founded in 1949 and quickly became a major source of capital for Japanese businesses.
