= Käru =

Borough in Estonia

- Small borough
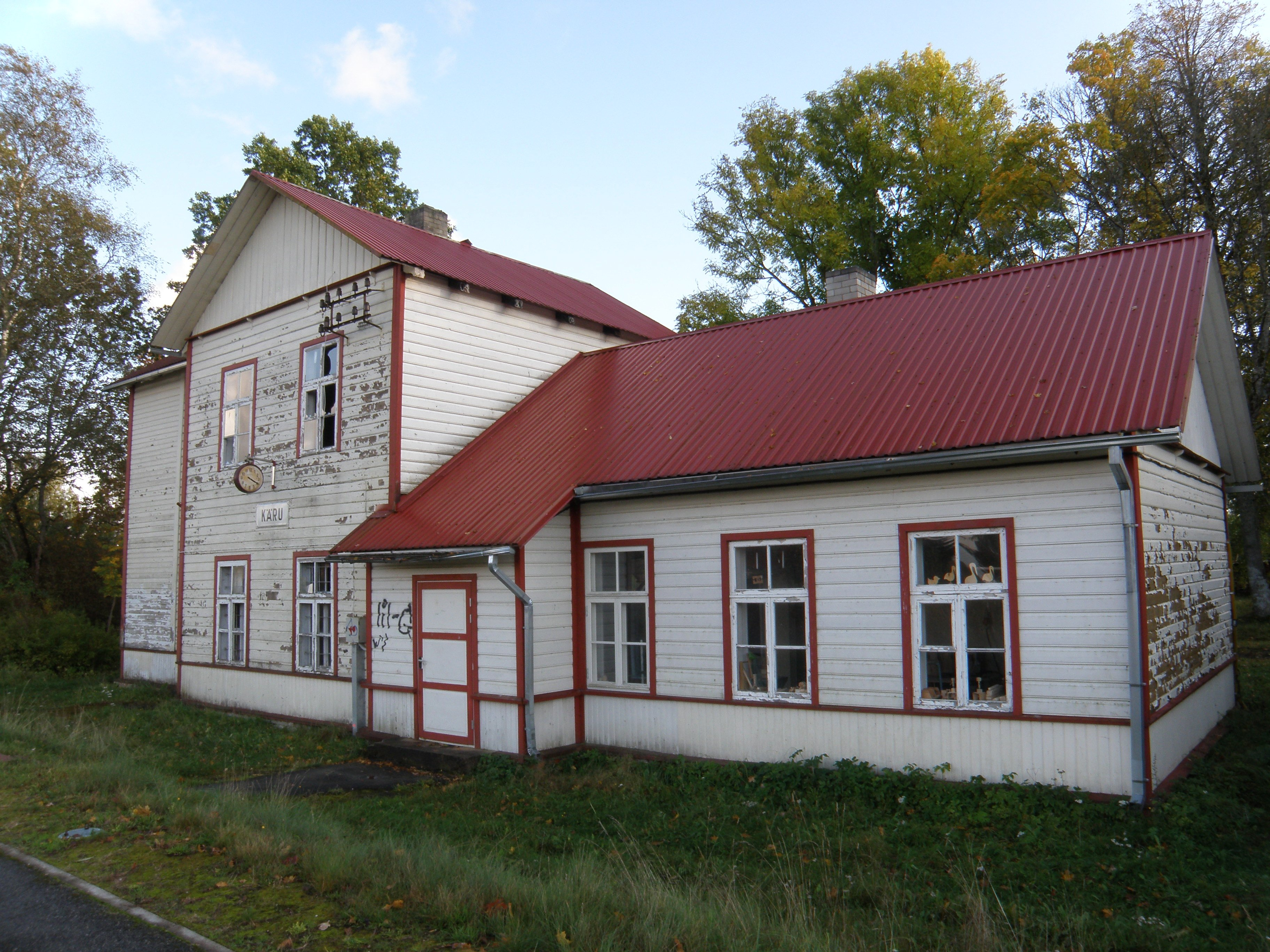
- Käru train station

- Location in Estonia
- Coordinates: 58°50′4″N 25°8′33″E
- Country: Estonia
- County: Järva County
- Municipality: Türi Parish

Käru is a small borough (Estonian: alevik) in Türi Parish, Järva County, Estonia. Before the administrative reform in 2017, Käru was the administrative centre of Käru Parish.

Käru has a railway station on the railway line from Tallinn to Viljandi operated by Elron (rail transit).

== Käru manor ==
Käru (German: Kerro) was established as an estate in the mid-18th century. The present building was built in 1878 and designed by the Riga architect Robert Pflug. It is an eclectic building with mainly neo-Renaissance elements. It was damaged during the Revolution of 1905 and also during World War II. The manor house ensemble has several well-preserved and unusual outbuildings and annexes.

The explorer Karl von Ditmar was the landowner of Käru.

The economist Ragnar Nurkse (1907–1959) was born in Käru Manor.

== Gallery ==
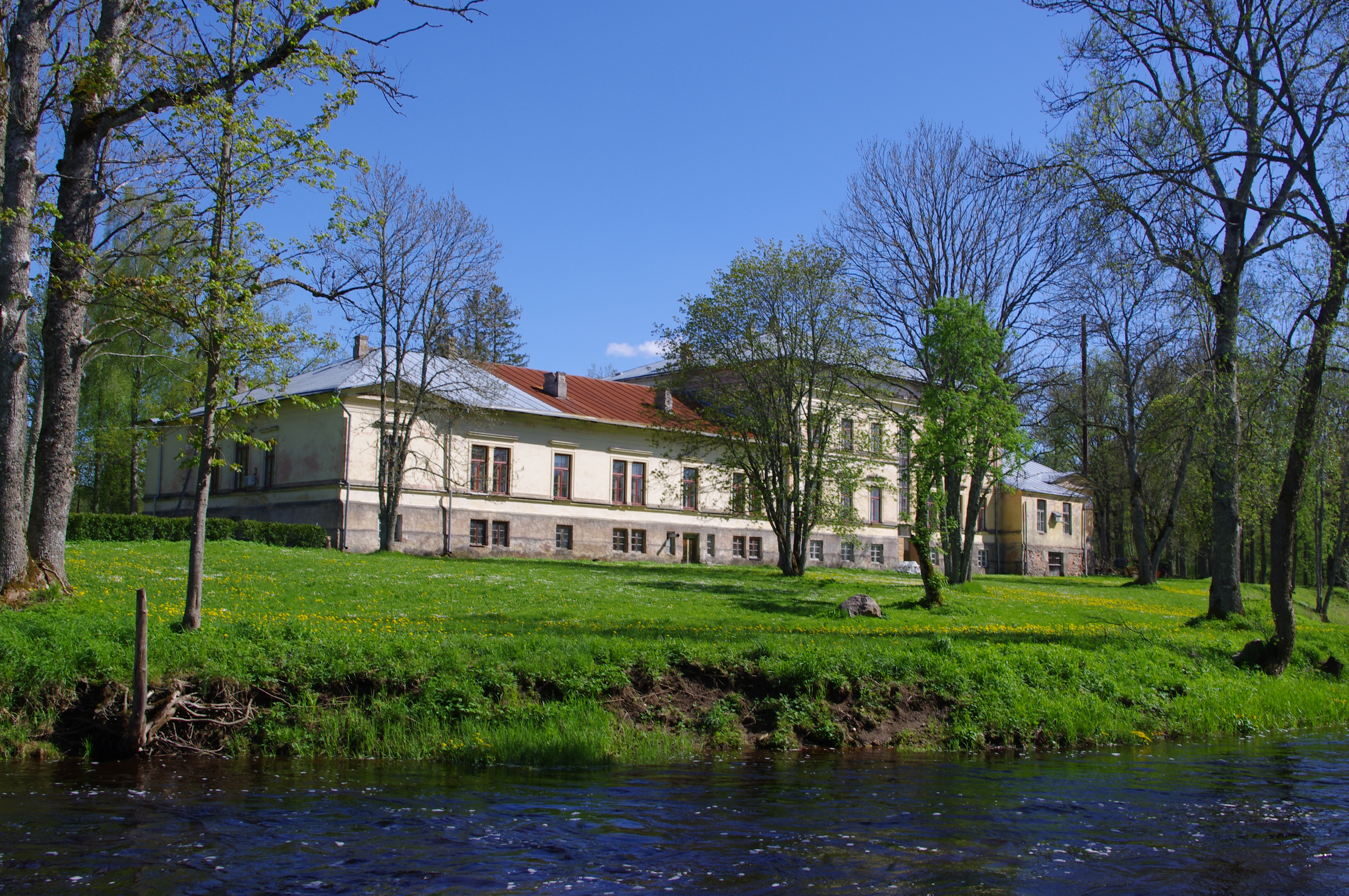
Käru Manor

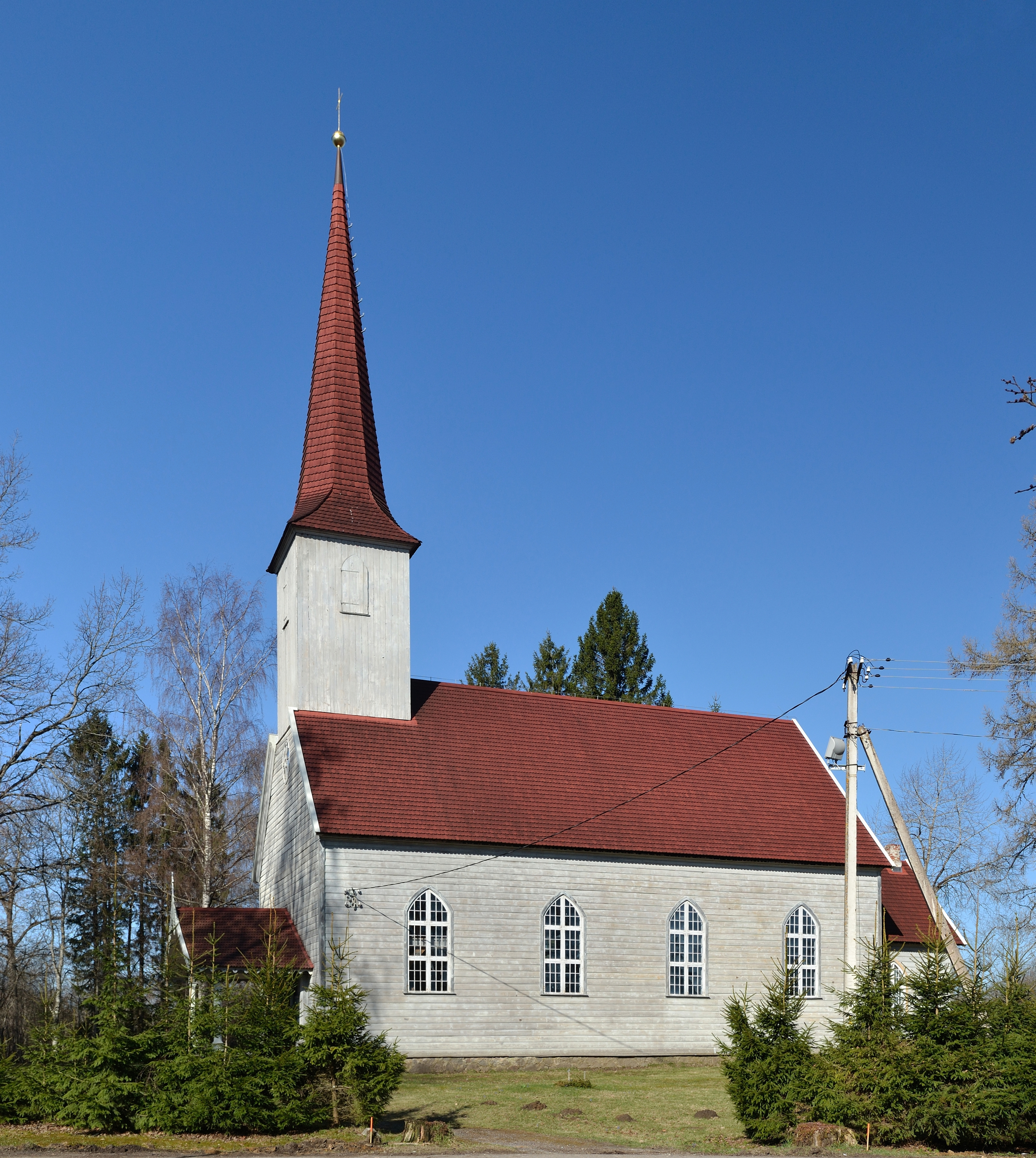
Wooden church in Käru

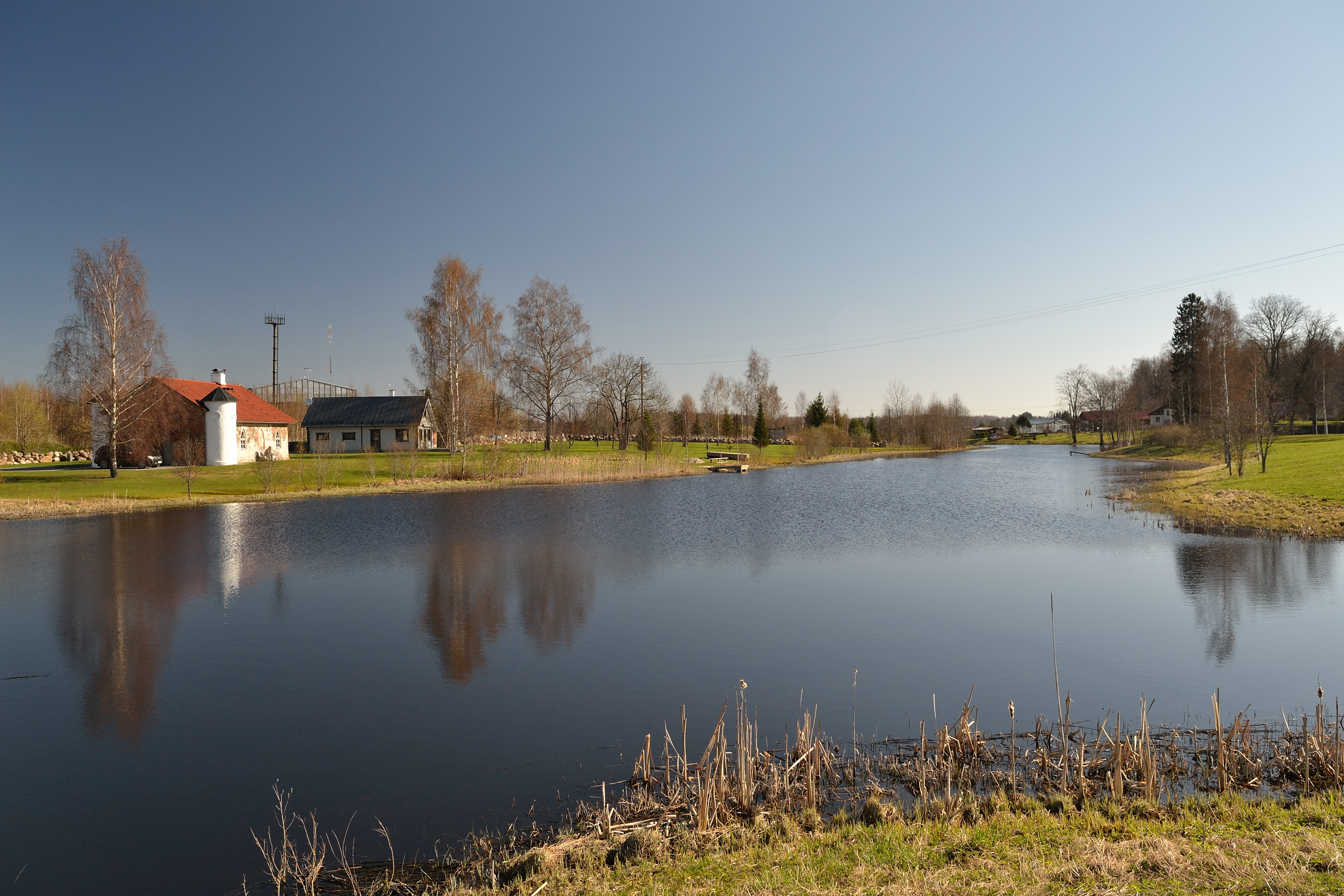
Käru reservoir

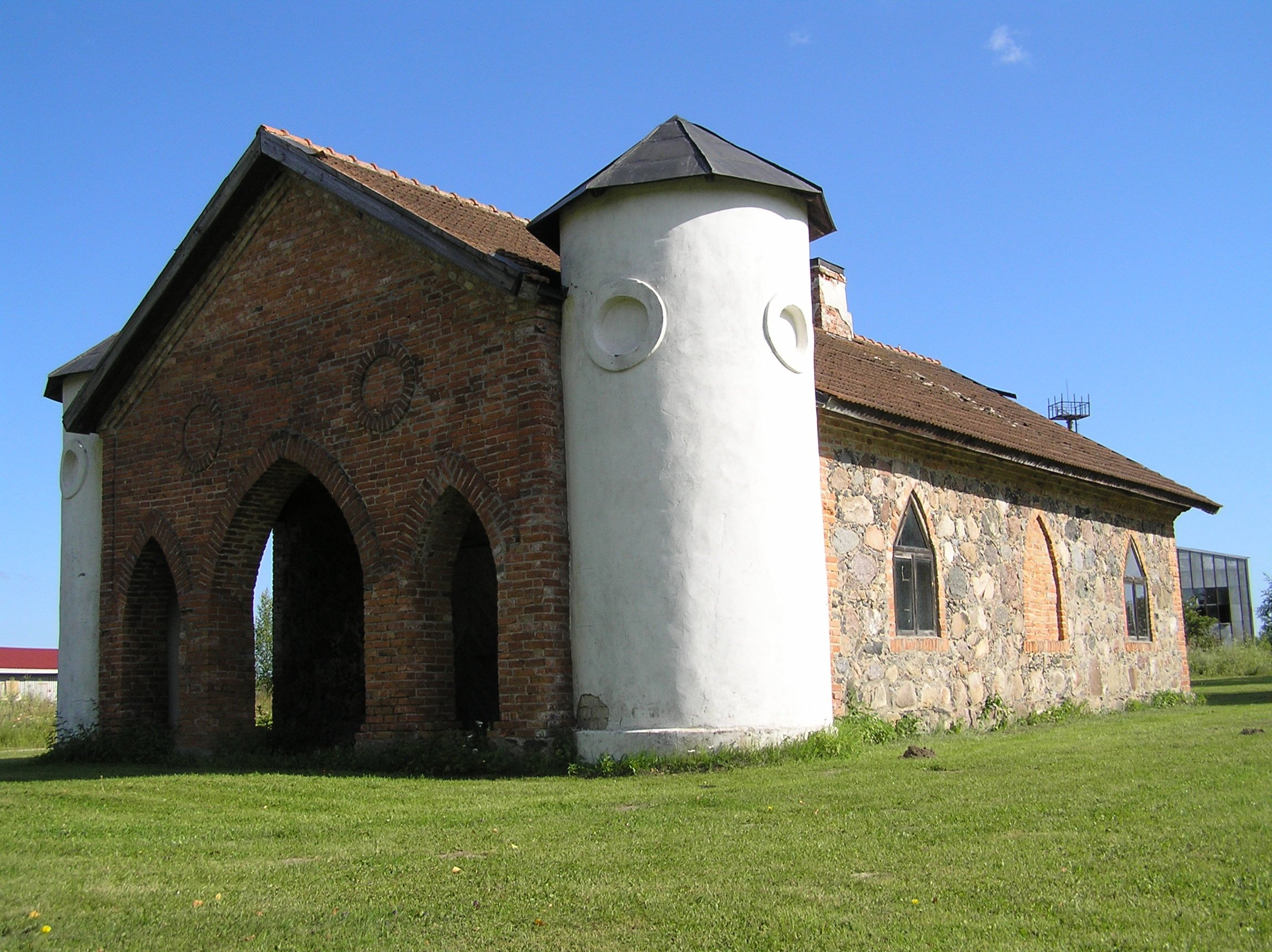
The smithy at Käru Manor

== See also ==
- List of palaces and manor houses in Estonia
