= Edwin Kuh =

American economist (1925–1986)

- Born: April 13, 1925; Chicago, Illinois, US
- Died: June 9, 1986 (aged 61); Cambridge, Massachusetts, US

Academic background
- Education: Harvard University; Williams College
- Influences: James Duesenberry; John Lintner; Guy Orcutt

Academic work
- Discipline: Economics; Econometrics
- Institutions: Massachusetts Institute of Technology

Edwin Kuh (April 13, 1925 – June 9, 1986) was an American economist. He was a faculty member at the MIT Sloan School of Management for over 30 years, and was widely known for his work with econometric models to forecast production, savings, investment, business cycle, unemployment, and related functions. John Kenneth Galbraith called him "one of the most innovative economists of his generation."

A native of Chicago, Kuh attended Williams College and received his Ph.D. degree from Harvard University in 1955; the year after, he joined the faculty of the MIT Sloan School of Management as an associate professor. His dissertation topic—business investment decisions—coincided with that of a Harvard classmate, John R. Meyer, leading them to merge both papers and publish it as The Investment Decision: An Empirical Study in 1957. In 1972, Kuh headed George McGovern's economic advisory panel during his presidential campaign.

== Selected publications ==
- Belsley, David A.; Kuh, Edwin; Welsch, Roy E. (1980). Regression Diagnostics: Identifying Influential Data and Sources of Collinearity. New York: Wiley. ISBN 0-471-05856-4.
- Kuh, Edwin (1959). "The Validity of Cross-Sectionally Estimated Behavior Equations in Time Series Applications". Econometrica. 27 (2): 197–214. doi:10.2307/1909442. JSTOR 1909442.
- Kuh, Edwin; Meyer, John R. (1955). "Correlation and Regression Estimates when the Data are Ratios". Econometrica. 23 (4): 400–416. doi:10.2307/1905347. JSTOR 1905347.
