= Lauri, Järva County =

Village in Estonia

Coordinates: 58°50′N 25°09′E

Lauri
- Village
- Interactive map of Lauri
- Country: Estonia
- County: Järva County
- Parish: Türi Parish
- Time zone: UTC+2 (EET)
  - Summer (DST): UTC+3 (EEST)

Lauri is a village in Türi Parish, Järva County in central Estonia. It was a part of Käru Parish before administrative reform in 2017.
