= Journal of Political Economy =

Academic journal by the University of Chicago Press

- Discipline: Economics
- Language: English
- Edited by: Esteban Rossi-Hansberg

Publication details
- History: 1892–present
- Publisher: University of Chicago Press for the University of Chicago Department of Economics and the University of Chicago Booth School of Business
- Frequency: Monthly
- Impact factor: 9.103 (2020)

Standard abbreviations
- ISO 4: J. Political Econ.

Indexing
- CODEN: JLPEAR
- ISSN: 0022-3808 (print); 1537-534X (web)
- LCCN: 08001721
- JSTOR: 00223808
- OCLC no.: 300934604

Links
- Journal homepage; Online archive

The Journal of Political Economy is a monthly peer-reviewed academic journal published by the University of Chicago Press. Established by James Laurence Laughlin in 1892, it covers both theoretical and empirical economics. In the past, the journal published quarterly from its introduction through 1905, ten issues per volume from 1906 through 1921, and bimonthly from 1922 through 2019. The editor-in-chief is Esteban Rossi-Hansberg (University of Chicago).

It is considered one of the top five journals in economics.

== JPE Micro and JPE Macro ==
In 2023, University of Chicago Press announced the establishment of Journal of Political Economy Microeconomics (JPE Micro) and Journal of Political Economy Macroeconomics (JPE Macro), two new journals that are vertically integrated with the Journal of Political Economy.

== Abstracting and indexing ==
The journal is abstracted and indexed in EBSCO, ProQuest, EconLit, Research Papers in Economics, Current Contents/Social & Behavioral Sciences, and the Social Sciences Citation Index. According to the Journal Citation Reports, the journal has a 2020 impact factor of 9.103, ranking it 4/376 journals in the category "Economics".

The journal is department-owned University of Chicago journal.

== Notable papers ==
Among the most influential papers that appeared in the Journal of Political Economy are:

- "The Economics of Exhaustible Resources", by Harold Hotelling; Vol. 39, No. 2 (1931), pp. 137–175. JSTOR 1822328

... stated Hotelling's rule, laid foundations to non-renewable resource economics.

- "The Economics of Slavery in the Ante Bellum South", by Alfred H. Conrad and John R. Meyer; Vol. 66, No. 2 (1958), pp. 95–130. JSTOR 1827270

... first to apply econometric methods to a historic question, which triggered the development of Cliometrics.

- "The Pricing of Options and Corporate Liabilities", by Fischer Black and Myron Scholes; Vol. 81, No. 3 (1973), pp. 637–654. JSTOR 1831029

... highly influential for introducing the Black–Scholes model for option pricing.

- "Are Government Bonds Net Wealth?", by Robert Barro; Vol. 82, No. 6 (1974), pp. 1095–1117. JSTOR 1830663

... re-introduced the Ricardian equivalence to macroeconomics, pointing out flaws in Keynesian theory.

- "Rules Rather than Discretion: The Inconsistency of Optimal Plans", by Finn E. Kydland and Edward C. Prescott; Vol. 85, No. 3 (1977), pp. 473–492. JSTOR 1830193

... influential new classical critique of Keynesian macroeconomic modelling.

- "Endogenous Technological Change", by Paul M. Romer; Vol. 98, No. 5, (1990) pp. S71–S102. JSTOR 2937632

... the second of two papers in which Romer laid foundations to the endogenous growth theory.

- "Increasing Returns and Economic Geography", by Paul Krugman; Vol. 99, No. 3 (1991), pp. 483–499. JSTOR 2937739

... revived the field of economic geography, introducing the core–periphery model.
