= Alexander Gerschenkron =

American economic historian (1904–1978)

- Александр Файвелевич Гершенкройн
- Born: 1 October 1904; Odessa, Russian Empire (now Odesa, Ukraine)
- Died: 26 October 1978 (aged 74); Cambridge, Massachusetts, U.S.

Academic background
- Education: University of Vienna
- Influences: Max Weber

Academic work
- Discipline: Economic history
- School or tradition: Historical school of economics
- Institutions: Harvard University
- Influenced: Alfred H. Conrad; Albert Fishlow; Deirdre McCloskey; John R. Meyer; Göran Ohlin; Henry Rosovsky; Peter Temin; Paul A. David

Alexander Gerschenkron (Russian: Александр Гершенкройн; 1 October 1904 – 26 October 1978) was an American economic historian and professor at Harvard University trained in the German historical school of economics.

Born into a Jewish family in Odessa, then part of the Russian Empire, now in Ukraine, Gerschenkron fled the country during the Russian Civil War in 1920 to Austria, where he attended the University of Vienna, earning a doctorate in 1928. After the Anschluss in 1938, he emigrated to the United States.

== Biography ==
Gerschenkron was born in Odessa in the Russian Empire (present-day Ukraine) into a well-to-do Jewish family from Bessarabia. When he was 16, he and his father left Russia during the period of the Bolshevik Revolution. They eventually settled in Vienna, Austria. There he taught himself languages, including German and Latin. In 1924, he enrolled in the University of Vienna's school of economics, graduating in 1928.

After graduation, Gerschenkron got married and had a child. He found work in Vienna as a representative for a Belgian motorcycle firm. He worked for the firm for three years, but then decided to commit himself to politics, in particular the Social Democrats. However, in 1934 the party ceased to exist after the Austrian Civil War.

In 1938, Gerschenkron and his family emigrated to the United States after the annexation of Austria to the German Reich. Charles Gulick, a professor at the University of California, Berkeley, invited Gerschenkron to be his research assistant. Gerschenkron spent twelve months researching and writing to help produce Gulick's book, Austria: From Habsburg to Hitler. He researched at the University of California, Berkeley, for five years and then in 1943 he moved to Washington, D. C., to join the Federal Reserve Board.

In 1944 he worked with the Federal Reserve in the Research and Statistics department. During his time on the Federal Reserve Board, Gerschenkron established himself as an expert on the Soviet economy. His knowledge was of vital importance to the Board, because it was during a time when the relationship between the Soviet Union and the United States was a central issue. He worked on the Federal Reserve Board for four years, and was eventually promoted to the head of the International Section.

In 1945, Gerschenkron became an American citizen and in 1948, he left the Federal Reserve Board to accept a position as a tenured professor at Harvard University. He was a professor of economics at Harvard for about 25 years. There, he taught economic history and Soviet studies.

Gerschenkron was an elected member of the American Academy of Arts and Sciences (1963) and the American Philosophical Society (1970).

In a 2012 research article, the Dutch social historian Marcel van der Linden demonstrates that Gerschenkron was a member of the Social Democratic Workers' Party of Austria, one of the two major political parties in Austria, which has ties to the Austrian Trade Union Federation (ÖGB) and the Austrian Chamber of Labour (AK); and, later, the Communist Party of Austria, both banned between 1933 and 1945 under both the Fatherland Front regime and the Third Reich control of Austria after the 1938 Anschluss. Gerschenkron kept his former political affiliations a secret after he was able to immigrate to the United States.

== Research ==
Gerschenkron kept to his Russian roots—in his economics, history and as a critic of Russian literature. His early work concentrated on development in the Soviet Union and Eastern Europe. In a celebrated 1947 article, he found the Gerschenkron effect (changing the base year for an index determines the growth rate of the index). His early work often pursued the statistical tricks of Soviet planners.

=== The "Gerschenkron effect" ===
In 1954, Gerschenkron published a celebrated article, A Dollar Index of Soviet Machinery Output, 1927–1928 to 1937, in which he introduced what is now called the Gerschenkron effect (the difference between calculated Paasche and Laspeyres volume indexes). In this study, he constructed a series of dollar indexes of Soviet industrial output for the purpose of proving the deficiencies of the official Soviet index during that time (1927–1937). He showed that the high rate of growth of Soviet industrial production was an effect of index number bias: a Laspeyres index calculated on the basis of 1926–1927 weights significantly overstates real expansion. This "Gerschenkron effect" was a significant finding that deflated the announced superior Soviet growth.

The OECD website gives a more detailed description of the Gerschenkron effect:

The Gerschenkron effect can arise with aggregation methods that use either a reference price structure or a reference volume structure to compare countries. For methods employing a reference price structure, a country's share of total GDP (that is the total for the group of countries being compared) will rise as the reference price structure becomes less characteristic of its own price structure. For methods employing a reference volume structure, a country's share of total GDP will fall as the reference volume structure becomes less characteristic of its own volume structure. The Gerschenkron effect arises because of the negative correlation between prices and volumes. In other words, expenditure patterns change in response to changes in relative prices because consumers switch their expenditure towards relatively cheap products.

=== Economic Backwardness in Historical Perspective ===
In 1951, Gerschenkron wrote an essay Economic Backwardness in Historical Perspective, a cornerstone of his career, and of significance to European economic history. In it, he rejected linear views on economic development, modelled after the English Industrial Revolution, arguing instead that "what may have functioned as a prerequisite and, in a sense, as a 'cause' of industrialization in one country appears as an effect of industrialization in another." The big 'spurts' in growth of industrial output within backward countries result from the search for substitutes for the so-called 'prerequisities' of industrial growth found in the historical experience of advanced countries.

The essay deals with "economic backwardness", and argued that the more backward an economy is at the outset of economic development, the more likely certain conditions are to occur. Gerschenkron stated that a country such as Russia, backward relative to Britain when it embarked on industrialization, did not go through the same stages. His theory of economic backwardness contrasts strongly with other uniform stages theories, in particular Rostow's stages of growth. It predicts that the more "economically backward" a country is, the more we will see:

- More rapid rates of industrial growth
- A greater stress on producer or capital goods as compared to consumer goods
- More rapid growth spurts rather than gradual growth rates
- Larger scale of plants and firms and a greater emphasis on up-to-date technology: backward countries are able to purchase machinery from early producers, for example Russia (most backward country) would import Britain's (least backward economy) machinery and transportation equipment
- A greater emphasis on capital-intensive production rather than labor-intensive production
- A lower standard of living
- Less role played by agriculture
- A more active role by the government and large banks in supplying capital and entrepreneurship
- More "virulent" ideologies of growth.

Gerschenkron did not define economic backwardness but alluded to related factors: income per capita, amount of social overhead capital, literacy, savings rates and level of technology. He also referred to a northwest-to-southeast axis within Europe, with Britain as the least backward, followed by Belgium, the Netherlands, France, Germany, Austria, Italy, and—the most backward—Russia. In his essay, he mostly discusses Britain, Germany and Russia.

Despite his roots in the Austrian school, he criticized the "penny pinching, 'not-one-heller-more-policies'" of the prominent Austrian economist Eugen von Böhm-Bawerk when the latter was Austrian Minister of Finance. He laid much of the blame for Austria's economic backwardness on Böhm-Bawerk's unwillingness to spend heavily on public works projects.

=== Bread and Democracy in Germany ===
In 1943, Gerschenkron published a book titled Bread and Democracy in Germany. In this study, he analyzes the problem of the relation between democracy and the protection of agricultural products, particularly of grain, in Germany. Gerschenkron understands that the establishment of democracy in Germany depends on numerous factors, and in his book he specifically deals with one aspect of the problem, the position of the Junkers and the agricultural policy in its relation to democracy.

He defines the economic history of the problem as this: In 1879, Germany introduced a new tariff and formulated a definite policy, which protected domestic grain production against overseas competition. This policy worked in favor of the big estate owners, the Junkers, who held important political positions in Prussia. It also worked in favor to a major part of the German peasantry. In 1926, eight years after the Germans were defeated at World War I, the Junkers started to plot against the forces of democracy. They introduced a new era of increased agricultural protection, which once again favored the peasants and Junkers.

Gerschenkron arrives at this conclusion, "that democratic reconstruction of Germany... in insurance of world peace calls for a radical elimination of the Junkers as a social and economic group." He also recommends a radical land reform. To achieve the readjustment of agriculture and to place it on a competitive basis he suggests the introduction of a government trade monopoly of the bulk of agricultural products in Germany. With a monopoly in place, the government could set a price policy, which would force a number of farmers to discontinue grain production for the market and eventually carry out the needed adjustment of high cost agriculture to the international market conditions.

Gerschenkron also warns of the possible difficulties of creating a government monopoly. He believes the management of the monopoly would require "great practical skill and energy". He believes the Germans should include this program of the agricultural adjustment plan in the peace treaties and entrust its execution and supervision to an international economic agency.

== Influence ==
Gerschenkron had a profound influence on his students. At Harvard, he led the Economic History Workshop and taught courses on Soviet economics and economic history. In economic history he taught a year-long course required of all graduate economics students. His course required two major dissertation papers and a final exam. He also led evening seminars once a week in which his graduate students would discuss ideas for dissertations and evaluate quantitative techniques.

Many of his students went on to have productive careers, and a good number of them have attained presidency of the Economic History Association. Ten of his students in the mid-1960s prepared a Festschrift in his honor. The book was titled Industrialization in Two Systems and was published in 1966.

== Gerschenkron as a scholar ==
Gerschenkron was known as an extremely bright scholar. As one of his former students Deirdre McCloskey put it, "Alexander Gerschenkron was not the best teacher or the best economist or the best historian among these—nor even, I think, the best human being. But he was the best scholar I have known."

Gerschenkron studied many subjects, from history of economics, economics of the Soviet Union, statistics, Greek poetry, and a great deal in between. He also learned many languages. From his studies in Austria, he learned Latin, Greek, French and German. Later in life he would pick up languages with ease—Swedish one week, Bulgarian the next. As an example of his facility with languages, Deirdre McCloskey tells of Gerschenkron's harsh evaluation of a Russian translation: "He wrote a devastating review of a translation from Russian of a book in economics, attacking in detail the author's apparently feeble command of the language. The translator had the temerity to approach Gerschenkron at a conference and say amiably, "I want you to know, Professor Gerschenkron, that I am not angry about your review." Gerschnkron replied, "Angry? Why should you be angry? Ashamed, yes; angry, no."

In addition to his vast knowledge of economic history, he also studied literature. He and his wife wrote an article together on translations of Shakespeare, which was published in a literary journal.

== Alexander Gerschenkron Prize ==
The Economic History Association created the Alexander Gershenkron Prize. It is awarded for the best dissertation in the economic history of an area outside of the United States or Canada. To be eligible for the Alexander Gerschenkron Prize, you must have received your Ph.D. within 2 years of when the award is given out.

== Selected publications ==
- (1943). Bread and democracy in Germany, Berkeley and Los Angeles: University of California press.
- (1945). Economic Relations with the U.S.S.R., New York.
- with Alexander Erlich (1951), A dollar index of Soviet machinery output, 1927–28 to 1937, Santa Monica, California: Rand Corporation.
- with Nancy Nimitz (1952), A dollar index of Soviet petroleum output, 1927–28 to 1937, Santa Monica, California: Rand Corporation.
- with Nancy Nimitz (1953), A dollar index of Soviet iron and steel output 1927/28–1937, Santa Monica, California: Rand Corporation.
- (1954), A dollar index of Soviet electric power output, Santa Monica, California: Rand Corporation.
- (1954), Soviet heavy industry: a dollar index of output, 1927/28–1937, Santa Monica, California: Rand Corporation.
- (1962), Economic Backwardness in Historical Perspective, a Book of Essays, Cambridge, Massachusetts: Belknap Press of Harvard University Press.
- (1966), Bread and Democracy in Germany, New York: H. Fertig.
- (1968), Continuity in History, and other essays, Cambridge, Massachusetts: Belknap Press of Harvard University Press.
- (1970), Europe in the Russian Mirror: Four Lectures in Economic History, London: Cambridge University Press.
- (1977), An Economic Spurt that Failed: Four Lectures in Austrian History, Princeton, New Jersey: Princeton University Press.
- (1989), Bread and Democracy in Germany. With a new foreword by Charles S. Maier, Ithaca, New York: Cornell University Press.
