= James Duesenberry =

American economist

- Born: July 18, 1918; West Virginia, US
- Died: October 5, 2009 (aged 91)

Academic background
- Education: University of Michigan
- Doctoral advisor: Arthur Smithies
- Influences: John Maynard Keynes; Michał Kalecki; John Hicks; Paul Samuelson

Academic work
- Discipline: Microeconomics; Behavioral economics
- School or tradition: Neo-Keynesian economics
- Institutions: Harvard University
- Doctoral students: Thomas Schelling; Edwin Kuh; John R. Meyer; Harry Gordon Johnson
- Notable ideas: Relative income hypothesis

James Stemble Duesenberry (July 18, 1918 – October 5, 2009) was an American economist. He made a significant contribution to the Keynesian analysis of income and employment with his 1949 doctoral thesis Income, Saving and the Theory of Consumer Behavior.

In Income, Saving and the Theory of Consumer Behavior, Duesenberry questioned basic economic assumptions about consumer behavior. He argued that consumer theory failed to take into account the importance of habit formation in establishing spending patterns. He also stressed the importance of social environment in determining an individual's level of expenditures. He proposed a mechanism called the "demonstration effect" by which people would modify their consumption patterns not because of changes in income or prices but from witnessing the consumption expenditures of others with whom they came into contact. That phenomenon, he argued, was driven by the interdependence of people's preferences and the need to maintain or increase one's social status and prestige. The strong social component driving people's consumption was a key aspect in his formulation of a distinct theory of consumption called the relative income hypothesis. By that theory, an individual's consumption and savings rate is more dependent on their income relative to those in their community than on their absolute level of income.

== Reception ==
While some contemporaries of Duesenberry saw his work as a large contribution to the field, it failed to gain significant traction. Kenneth Arrow believed that Duesenberry's work offered "one of the most significant contributions of the postwar period to our understanding of economic behavior".

Today, however, the work of Duesenberry is largely absent from standard economics textbooks. Yet some, such as Robert H. Frank, argue that it outperforms the alternative theories that displaced it in the 1950s, such as Milton Friedman's Permanent income hypothesis. Frank claims that Duesenberry's theory can explain why the rich tend to save at higher rates than the poor. Even as national income increases, the higher visible consumption of the rich encourages increased spending across other income levels. Additionally, Duesenberry's recognition of the importance of habit formation aligns the observed short-run rigidity of consumption, as families attempt to maintain their previous standard of living even during recessions.

== Background ==
Duesenberry attended the University of Michigan, where he earned his Bachelor of Arts in 1939, his Master of Arts in 1941, and his Doctor of Philosophy in 1948. He served as professor of economics at Harvard University from 1955 to 1989.

Duesenberry served on the Council of Economic Advisers under President Lyndon Johnson from 1966 to 1968.
