= Jõeküla, Türi Parish =

Village in Estonia

Coordinates: 58°47′N 25°07′E

Jõeküla
- Village
- Interactive map of Jõeküla
- Country: Estonia
- County: Rapla County
- Parish: Türi Parish
- Time zone: UTC+2 (EET)
  - Summer (DST): UTC+3 (EEST)

Jõeküla is a village in Türi Parish, Järva County in western-central Estonia. It was a part of Käru Parish before administrative reform in 2017.
