= Relative income hypothesis =

Economic theory

The relative income hypothesis was developed by James Duesenberry in 1949. It consists of two separate consumption hypotheses.

The first hypothesis states that an individual's attitude to consumption is dictated more by their income in relation to others than by an abstract standard of living. The percentage of income consumed by an individual depends on their percentile position within the income distribution.

The second hypothesis states that the present consumption is influenced not merely by present levels of absolute and relative income but also by levels of consumption attained in a previous period. In Duesenberry's opinion, it is difficult for a family to reduce a level of consumption once it is attained. The aggregate ratio of consumption to income is assumed to depend on the level of present income relative to past peak income.

== Sources ==
- Duesenberry, J. S. Income, Saving and the Theory of Consumer Behaviour. Cambridge: Harvard University Press, 1949.
- Frank, Robert H., 2005. “The Mysterious Disappearance of James Duesenberry,” The New York Times, June 9, 2005.
- Hollander, Heinz, 2001. “On the validity of utility statements: standard theory versus Duesenberry’s,” Journal of economic Behavior & Organization 45, 3: 227–249.
- McCormick, Ken (2018). "James Duesenberry as a practitioner of behavioral economics". Journal of Behavioral Economics for Policy. 2 (1): 13–18.
