= Sonni, Estonia =

Village in Estonia

Coordinates: 58°55′N 25°09′E

Sonni
- Village
- Interactive map of Sonni
- Country: Estonia
- County: Järva County
- Parish: Türi Parish
- Time zone: UTC+2 (EET)
  - Summer (DST): UTC+3 (EEST)

Sonni is a village in Türi Parish, Järva County in western-central Estonia. It was a part of Käru Parish before administrative reform in 2017.
