= Paul Rosenstein-Rodan =

Polish born economist (1902–1985)

- Born: 1902; Kraków, Grand Duchy of Cracow (Russian Empire now Poland)
- Died: April 28, 1985 (aged 82–83); Boston

Academic background
- Influences: Ragnar Nurkse

Academic work
- Discipline: Development economist

Paul Narcyz Rosenstein-Rodan (1902–1985) was an economist of Jewish origin born in Kraków, who was trained in the Austrian tradition under Hans Mayer in Vienna. His early contributions to economics were in pure economic theory – on marginal utility, complementarity, hierarchical structures of wants and the pervasive Austrian School issue of time.

Rosenstein-Rodan emigrated to Britain in 1930, and taught at University College London and then at London School of Economics until 1947. He then moved to the World Bank, before moving on to MIT, where he was a professor from 1953 to 1968.

He is the author of the 1943 article "Problems of Industrialisation of Eastern and South-Eastern Europe" – origin of the "Big Push Model" theory – in which he argued for planned large-scale investment programmes in industrialisation in countries with a large surplus workforce in agriculture, in order to take advantage of network effects, viz economies of scale and scope, to escape the low level equilibrium "trap". He thus developed a theme laid out by Allyn Young in his 1928 article "Increasing Returns and Economic Progress", in which the latter himself expanded a theme formulated by Adam Smith in 1776.

The International Institute of Social Studies (ISS) awarded its Honorary Fellowship to Paul Rosenstein-Rodan in 1962.

His sister was the Polish painter and poet Erna Rosenstein.

His imagined scenario of 20,000 shoe factory workers seems to have been developed by popular fiction writer Douglas Adams into 'the most totally evil place in the Galaxy' Frogstar World B.

== Works ==
- "Grenznutzen", Handworterbuch der Staatswissenschaften v 4 (1927), pp. 1190–223.
- "Das Zeitmoment in der Mathematischen Theorie des Wirschaftlichen Gleichgewichtes", Zeitschrift für Nationalökonomie v1 (1929) #1, pp. 129–42.
- "La Complementarietà: Prima delle tre tappe del progresso della Teoria Economica Pura", La Riforma Sociale (1933).
- "The Role of Time in Economic Theory", Economica N. S., v 1 (1934) #1.
- "A Coordination of the Theories of Money and Price", Economica v3 (1936), pp. 257–80.
- "Problems of Industrialization of Eastern and South- Eastern Europe", Economic Journal v 53, No. 210/211, (1943), pp. 202–11.
- "The International Development of Economically Backward Areas", International Affairs v 20 (1944) #2 (April), pp. 157–65.
- Disguised Underemployment and Under-employment in Agriculture, (1956).
- "Uwagi o teorii 'wielkiego pchnięcia'", Ekonomista #2 (1959).
- "International Aid for Underdeveloped Countries", Review of Economic Statics v 43 (1961).
- "Notes on the Theory of the Big Push", in Ellis, editor, Economic Development for Latin America (1961).
- "Criteria for Evaluation of National Development Effort", Journal of Development Planning v 1 (1969).
- The New International Economic Order (1981).
