= Economic transformation =

In economics, economic transformation refers to the continuous process of (1) moving labour and other resources from lower- to higher-productivity sectors (structural change) and (2) raising within-sector productivity growth. As such, economic transformation emphasises the movement from low- to high-productivity activities within and across all sectors (which can be tasks or activities that are combinations of agriculture, manufacturing and services). This movement of resources from lower- to higher-productivity activities is a key driver of economic development.

Within-sector productivity growth (also called ′sector transformation') entails the adoption of new technologies and management practices that increase the efficiency of production. It can come about as a result of the increased efficiency of existing firms or as a result of the reallocation of resources away from the least productive firms towards more productive firms.

== Measures of economic transformation ==
Economic transformation can be measured through production/value-added measures and trade-based measures. Production-based measures include: (1) sector value added and employment data, to show productivity gaps between sectors; and (2) firm-level productivity measures, to examine average productivity levels of firms within one sector.

Trade-based measures include: (1) measures of revealed comparative advantage to show the levels of specialisation of a country in certain exports; and (2) export diversification measures such as those produced by the International Monetary Fund.
