= Ragnar Nurkse =

Estonian-American economist

- Born: October 5, 1907; Käru, Governorate of Livonia, Russian Empire (now Estonia)
- Died: May 6, 1959 (aged 51); Le Mont-Pèlerin, Switzerland

Academic background
- Education: University of Tartu; University of Edinburgh; University of Vienna

Academic work
- Institutions: Columbia University; Princeton University; University of Oxford; University of Geneva
- Notable ideas: Balanced Growth Theory

Ragnar Wilhelm Nurkse (5 October 1907, (Note: 5 October [O.S. 22 September] 1907) Käru, Estonia – 6 May 1959, Le Mont-Pèlerin, Switzerland) was an Estonian-American economist and policy maker mainly in the fields of international finance and economic development. He is considered the pioneer of Balanced Growth Theory.

== Life ==
Ragnar Nurkse was born in Käru village, in the then Governorate of Livonia of the former Russian Empire (now in Järva County, Estonia), son of an Estonian father who worked himself up from lumberjack to estate manager, and an Estonian-Swedish mother. His parents emigrated to Canada in 1928.

After finishing primary school, Nurkse attended the Domschule zu Reval in Tallinn, the most prestigious, German-language secondary school in the city, from where he graduated with higher honors in 1926. He continued his education at the law and economics' departments of the University of Tartu in 1926–1928, and then in economics at the University of Edinburgh. He graduated with a first class degree in economics, under professor Frederick Ogilvie, in 1932. He earned a Carnegie Fellowship to study at the University of Vienna from 1932 to 1934.

Nurkse served in the Economic and Financial Organization of the League of Nations from 1934 to 1945, working in the Financial Section and Economic Intelligence Service. He was the financial analyst and was largely responsible for the annual Monetary Review. He was also involved with the publication of The Review of World Trade, World Economic Surveys, and the report of the Delegation on Economic Depressions entitled "The Transition from War to Peace Economy". Nurkse authored the 1935 monograph Internationale Kapitalbewegungen on international capital movements. He was influential for his criticism of floating exchange rates, which he argued were at fault for the economic crises of the interwar period. According to Nurkse, floating exchange rates were subject to "cumulative and self-aggravating movements".

In 1945, Nurkse accepted an appointment at Columbia University in New York City. He was a visiting lecturer at the university from 1945 to 1946, was a member of the Institute for Advanced Study in Princeton, New Jersey, from 1946 to 1947, and then returned to Columbia as an associate professor of economics in 1947. In 1949, he was promoted to Full Professor of Economics, a position which he held almost until his death in 1959. Nurkse spent a sabbatical (1954–1955) at the Nuffield College of the University of Oxford, and in 1958–1959, another one studying economic development in the University of Geneva, and lecturing around the world.

In 1958, Ragnar Nurkse accepted a Professorship of Economics and the Director of International Finance Section position at Princeton University. However, before he could fully resume it, when Nurkse returned to Geneva in the spring of 1959, he died suddenly of a heart attack at the age of 51.

For his 100th anniversary on 5 October 2007, the Estonian Postal Service commemorated Nurkse with an international letter stamp. A stone monument with a plaque was also unveiled across the house he was born in Käru. He was also honored earlier in 2007 by the inauguration of a Lecture Series by the Bank of Estonia and an international conference by Tallinn University of Technology's Technology Governance program. An economics professorship at Columbia is named in his honor. In 2013, Tallinn University of Technology named one of its departments in honor of him: The Ragnar Nurkse Department of Innovation and Governance.

== Work ==
Nurkse is one of the founding fathers of Classical Development Economics. Together with Rosenstein-Rodan and Mandelbaum, he promoted a 'theory of the big push', emphasized the role of savings and capital formation in economic development, and argued that poor nations remained poor because of a 'vicious circle of poverty'. Among his major works are International Currency Experience: Lessons of the Interwar Period (1944), the foundation of the Bretton Woods Agreement, Conditions of International Monetary Equilibrium (1945), and Problems of Capital Formation in Underdeveloped Countries (1953).

== Private life ==
Ragnar Nurkse married Harriet Berger of Englewood, New Jersey, in 1946, and they had two sons. One of them is the poet Dennis Nurkse.

== See also ==
- Ragnar Nurkse's balanced growth theory

== Bibliography ==
- Nurkse, Ragnar. Trade and Development. Rainer Kattel, Jan A. Kregel and Erik S. Reinert, eds. London – New York: Anthem, 2009. (ISBN 1843317877) Collection of all key works by Nurkse.
- Nurkse, Ragnar (1944). International Currency Experience: Lessons of the Interwar Period. Geneva: League of Nations.
- Kattel, Rainer, Jan A. Kregel and Erik S. Reinert, eds. Ragnar Nurkse (1907–2007): Classical Development Economics and its Relevance for Today. London – New York: Anthem, 2009. (ISBN 1843317869)
- Kukk, Kalev (2004). (Re)discovering Ragnar Nurkse. Kroon & Economy No. 1, 2004.
