= Kullimaa, Järva County =

Village in Estonia

Coordinates: 58°45′07″N 25°06′50″E

Kullimaa
- Village
- Interactive map of Kullimaa
- Country: Estonia
- County: Järva County
- Parish: Türi Parish
- Time zone: UTC+2 (EET)
  - Summer (DST): UTC+3 (EEST)

Kullimaa is a village in Türi Parish, Järva County in central Estonia. It was a part of Käru Parish before administrative reform in 2017.
