= Esteban Rossi-Hansberg =

Mexican-American economist

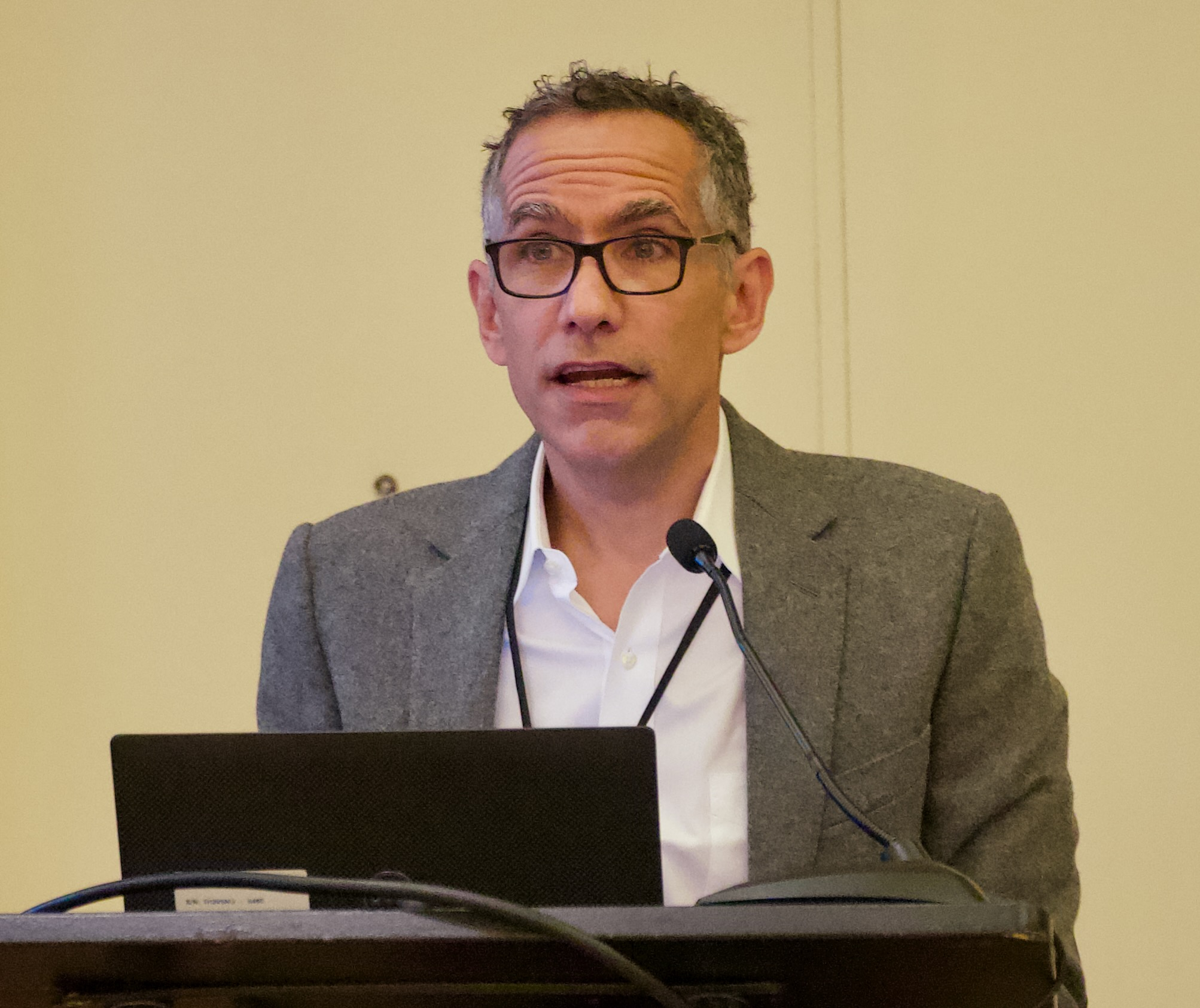
- Born: July 16, 1973 (age 53)
- Citizenship: U.S. Mexico

Academic background
- Education: University of Chicago
- Academic advisor: Robert E. Lucas Jr.
- Website: www.rossihansberg.com; Information at IDEAS / RePEc

Esteban Rossi-Hansberg (born July 16, 1973) is a Mexican-American economist currently the Glen A. Lloyd Distinguished Service Professor in the Kenneth C. Griffin Department of Economics at the University of Chicago. Until June 2021, he was the Theodore A. Wells '29 Professor of Economics at Princeton University. He performs research in macroeconomics, international trade, and urban and regional economics. His research focuses on the internal structure of cities, the distribution of economic activity in space, economic growth and the size distribution of cities, the effect of offshoring on wage inequality, the role of information technology on wages and organization, and firm dynamics and the size distribution of firms. Rossi-Hansberg was also a faculty member in the Economics Department at Stanford University. He is a research fellow in the NBER and the CEPR, and a Fellow of the Econometric Society since 2017. He is the lead editor of the Journal of Political Economy.
