= Alfred H. Conrad =

American economist (1924–1970)

- Born: January 2, 1924; Brooklyn, New York
- Died: October 18, 1970 (aged 46); Peacham, Vermont
- Spouse: Adrienne Rich

Academic background
- Education: Harvard University
- Influences: Alexander Gerschenkron

Academic work
- Discipline: Economic history Transportation economics
- Institutions: City College of New York

Alfred Haskell Conrad (January 2, 1924 – October 18, 1970) was a distinguished professor of economics at Harvard University and City College of New York. He belonged to the quantitative economic current called new economic history, or cliometrics.

Conrad attended Brooklyn Boys High and in 1947 graduated from Harvard College. There he completed a doctorate in economics in 1954 and later taught in the economics department and in the business school.

In 1958 he co-authored "The Economics of Slavery in the Antebellum South", in the Journal of Political Economy, with John R. Meyer. Using rigorous statistics, the authors concluded that the view that slavery would have disappeared without the American Civil War was "a romantic hypothesis which will not stand against the facts". This study anticipated Time on the Cross by Robert Fogel and Stanley Engerman, which reached the same conclusion.

Conrad was married to the poet Adrienne Rich, with whom he had three sons. He died of a self-inflicted gunshot wound in Peacham, Vermont at the age of 46.
