= Backwardness =

Lack of progress by a person or group

Backwardness is a lack of progress by a person or group to some perceived cultural norm of advancement, such as for example traditional societies relative to modern scientific and technologically advanced industrialized societies.

== Gerschenkron's model ==
The backwardness model is a theory of economic growth created by Alexander Gerschenkron. The model postulates that the more backward an economy is at the outset of economic development, the more likely certain conditions are to occur:

- Special institutions, including banks or the state, will be necessary to properly channel physical capital and human capital to industries.
- There will be an emphasis on the production of producer goods rather than consumer goods.
- There will be an emphasis on capital-intensive production rather than labor-intensive production.
- There will be a great scale of production and enterprise.
- There will be a reliance on borrowed rather than local technologies.
- The role of the agricultural sector, as a market for new industries, will be small.
- There will be a reliance on productivity growth.

The backwardness model is often contrasted with the Rostovian take-off model developed by W.W. Rostow, which presents a more linear and structuralist model of economic growth, planning it out in defined stages. The two models are not mutually exclusive, however, and many countries appear to follow both models rather adequately.

== Veblen ==
Thorstein Veblen's 1915 Imperial Germany and the Industrial Revolution is an extended essay comparing the United Kingdom and Germany, and concluding that the slowing of growth in Britain and the rapid advances in Germany were due to the "penalty of taking the lead".

British industry worked out, in a context of small competing firms, the best ways to produce efficiently. Germany's backwardness gave it an advantage in that the best practice could be adopted in large-scale firms.
