= John R. Meyer =

American economist

- Born: John Robert Meyer; December 6, 1927; Pasco, Washington, United States
- Died: October 20, 2009 (aged 81); Cambridge, Massachusetts, United States
- Spouse: Lee Stowell (m. 1949-2003)
- Children: 3

Academic background
- Education: Pacific University, University of Washington, Harvard University
- Doctoral advisor: Guy Orcutt; James Duesenberry
- Influences: Alexander Gerschenkron; John Lintner

Academic work
- School or tradition: New economic history
- Institutions: Harvard University
- Doctoral students: Franklin M. Fisher; Thomas J. Sargent
- Notable ideas: Transport economics Pioneer of cliometrics

John Robert Meyer (December 6, 1927 – October 20, 2009) was an American economist and educator. Meyer is credited with creating the field of transport economics and was one of the pioneers of cliometrics.

== Career ==
Born in Pasco, Meyer attended Pacific University from 1945 to 1946, after which he served in the United States Naval Reserve from 1945 to 1948. He received his Bachelor of Arts from the University of Washington in 1950, and a doctorate from Harvard University in 1955. His dissertation topic (business investment decisions) coincided with that of a Harvard classmate, Edwin Kuh, leading them to merge both papers and publish it as The Investment Decision: An Empirical Study in 1957.

Meyer was a professor at Harvard's Department of Economics from 1955 to 1968, and then at Yale University from 1968 to 1973. He returned to Cambridge in 1973 as a professor at the Harvard Business School until 1983. He served as president of the National Bureau of Economic Research from 1967 to 1977. Meyer was a consultant to the National Transportation Policy Study Commission from 1977 to 1979. He served as vice chairman and board member of Union Pacific Railroad. From 1996 to 1998, Meyer served as co-interim director of Harvard's Joint Center for Housing Studies, along with Gerald McCue. Meyer chaired their faculty committee from 1997 to 2003.

He ended his career at Harvard as the James W. Harpel Professor of Capital Formation and Economic Growth Emeritus at the Harvard Kennedy School. The Joint Center for Housing Studies named a dissertation fellowship in Meyer's honor.

=== Transport economics and cliometrics ===
Meyer and three co-authors (Merton Peck, John Stenason and Charles Zwick) published The Economics of Competition in the Transportation Industries in 1959. This book conducted a thorough analysis of costs and demand, which enabled the authors to study what the railroad industry might look like if it were better governed. Regulation of railroads had implicitly given incentivizes to passenger over freight trains. This made railroads less efficient and less profitable because intercity rail's great comparative advantage was moving goods over long distances. They are now credited with creating the field of transport economics. Meyer's second influential book on the topic was The Urban Transportation Problem, co-authored with John F. Kain and Martin Wohl. The book describes the process of American suburbanization and the rapid switch from public transportation to cars.

Meyer was also a pioneer of cliometrics. In 1958, he and fellow Harvard professor Alfred H. Conrad published The Economics of Slavery in the Antebellum South in the Journal of Political Economy. Using rigorous statistics, the authors concluded that the view that slavery in the United States would have disappeared without the American Civil War, as claimed by Charles W. Ramsdell, Ulrich Bonnell Phillips, and other historians is not supported by evidence. This anticipated the study by Robert Fogel, who later arrived at the same conclusion.

== Personal life ==
In 1949, Meyer married Lee Stowell, and they had three children: Leslie Karen; Ann Elizabeth; and Robert Conrad. In 2009, Meyer died on October 20 after a long battle with Parkinson's disease.

== Selected works ==
- Business Motivation and the Investment Decision: an Econometric Study of Postwar Investment Patterns in the Manufacturing Sector (1955)
- The Investment Decision: an Empirical Study, with Edwin Kuh (1957)
- The Economics of Competition in the Transportation Industries, with others (1959)
- Wage, Price, and National Income Relationships in Light of Recent Findings on the Behavior of Large Business Corporations (1959)
- New England's Transportation: a Fresh, New Look at Our Old Problems (1962)
- Technology and Urban Transportation, with John Kain and Martin Wohl (1962)
- The Economics of Slavery: and Other Studies in Econometric History, with Alfred Conrad (1964)
- Studies in Econometric History, with Alfred Conrad (1964)
- Investment Decisions, Economic Forecasting, and Public Policy, with Robert Glauber (1964)
- Transportation in the Program Budget (1965)
- The Urban Transportation Problem, with John Kain and Martin Wohl (1965)
- An Analysis of Investment Alternatives in the Colombian Transport System; Final Report, with Paul Roberts and David Kresge
- Essays in Regional Economics, with John Kain (1971)
- Urban Transportation in Summary and Perspective, with John Kain and Martin Wohl (1972)
- Measurement and Analysis of Productivity in Transportation Industries, (1975)
- The Economics of U-shaped Costs, with Robert Leone (1979)
- The Economics of Competition in the Telecommunications Industry (1980)
- The Impact of National Tax Policies on Homeownership, with Leslie Meyer (1981)
- Airline Deregulation: the Early Experience, with Clinton Oster and others (1981)
- Autos, Transit, and Cities, with Jose A. Gomez-Ibanez (1981)
- Deregulation and the New Airline Entrepreneurs, with Clinton Oster and Mami Clippinger (1984)
- Deregulation and the Future of Intercity Passenger Travel, with Clinton Oster and John Strong (1987)
- The Transition to Deregulation: Developing Economic Standards for Public Policies, with Bill Tye (1991)
- Private Toll Roads in the United States: the Early Experience of Virginia and California, with Jose A. Gomez-Ibanez (1991)
- The Political Economy of Transport Privatization: Successes, Failures and Lessons from Developed and Developing Countries, with Jose A. Gomez-Ibanez (1992)
- Going Private: the International Experience with Transport Privatization, with Jose A Ghomnez-Ibanez (1993)
- Moving to Market: Restructuring Transport in the Former Soviet Union, with John Strong, Clell Harral and Graham Smith (1996)
- The Role of Industrial and Post-industrial Cities in Economic Development (2000)
- American Railroads: Decline and Renaissance in the Twentieth Century, with Robert Gallamore (2014)
