= Käru Parish =

Former municipality of Estonia

Coordinates: 58°50′N 25°9′E

Käru Parish Käru vald
- Municipality of Estonia
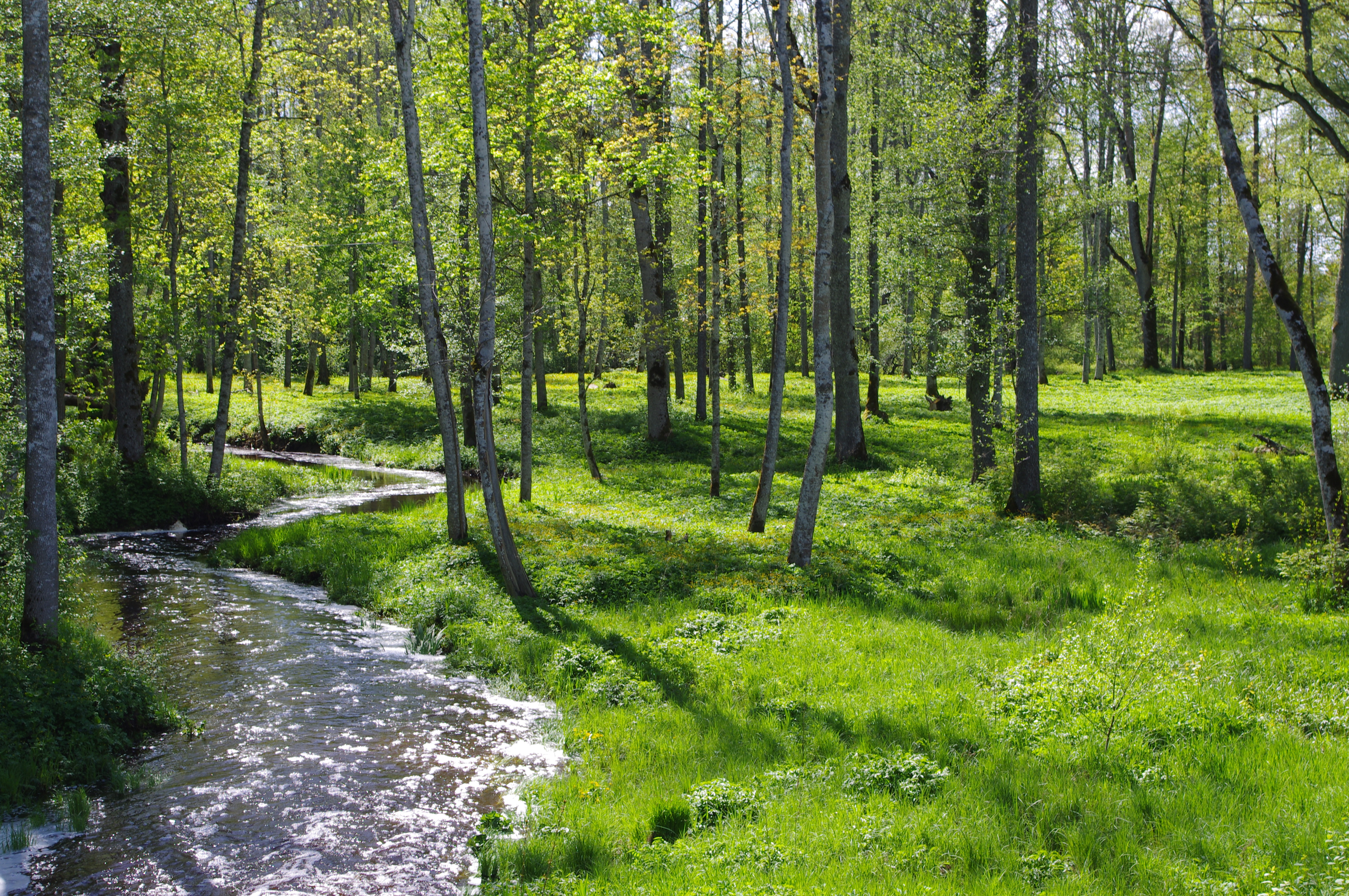
- Käru manor park

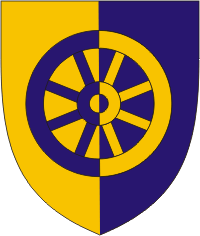
- Flag Coat of arms

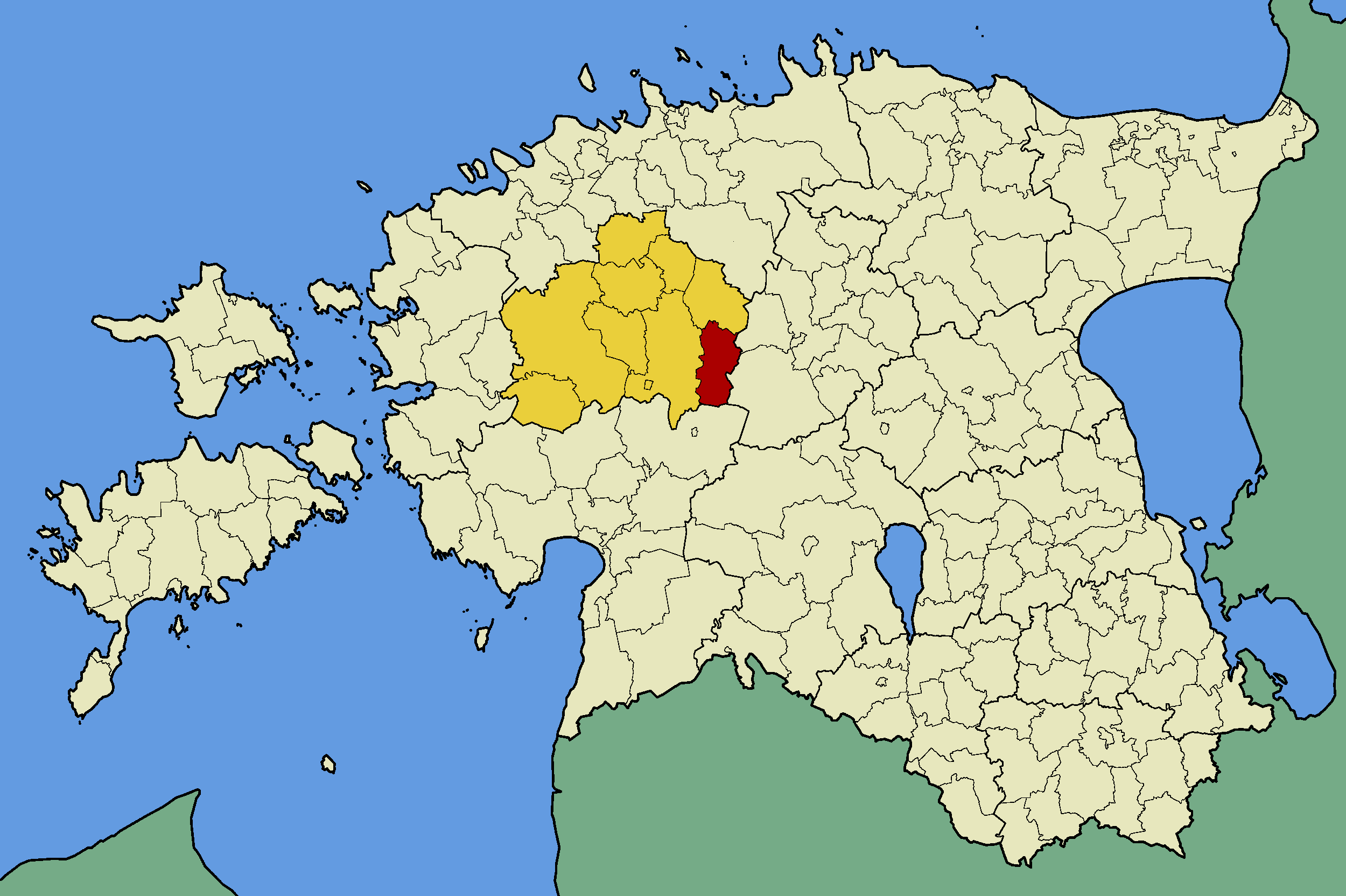
- Käru Parish within Rapla County.
- Country: Estonia
- County: Rapla County
- Administrative centre: Käru

Area
  - Total: 214.91 km^{2} (82.98 sq mi)

Population (2009)
  - Total: 676
  - Density: 3.15/km^{2} (8.15/sq mi)
- Website: www.karuvald.ee

Käru Parish (Estonian: Käru vald) was an Estonian municipality located in Rapla County. It had a population of 676 (as of 2009) and an area of 214.91 km^{2} (82.98 mi^{2}).

== Settlements ==
Small borough

Käru

Villages

Jõeküla - Kädva - Kändliku - Kõdu - Kullimaa - Lauri - Lungu - Sonni
