= Strategy of unbalanced growth =

Economic growth strategy

Unbalanced growth is a natural path of economic development. Situations that countries are in at any one point in time reflect their previous investment decisions and development. Accordingly, at any point in time desirable investment programs that are not balanced investment packages may still advance welfare. Unbalanced investment can complement or correct existing imbalances. Once such an investment is made, a new imbalance is likely to appear, requiring further compensating investments. Therefore, growth need not take place in a balanced way. Supporters of the unbalanced growth doctrine include Albert O. Hirschman, Hans Singer, Paul Streeten, Marcus Fleming, Walt Rostow and J. Sheehan.

== Introduction ==
The theory is generally associated with Hirschman. He presented a complete theoretical formulation of the strategy. Underdeveloped countries display common characteristics: low levels of GNI per capita and slow GNI per capita growth, large income inequalities and widespread poverty, low levels of productivity, great dependence on agriculture, a backward industrial structure, a high proportion of consumption and low savings, high rates of population growth and dependency burdens, high unemployment and underemployment, technological backwardness. Additionally, they exhibit 'dualism', the existence of both traditional and modern sectors. In a less-developed country, these characteristics lead to scarce resources or inadequate infrastructure to exploit these resources. With a lack of investors and entrepreneurs, cash flows cannot be directed into various sectors that influence balanced economic growth.

Hirschman contends that deliberate unbalancing of the economy according to the strategy is the best method of development and if the economy is to be kept moving ahead, the task of development policy is to maintain tension, disproportions and disequilibrium. Balanced growth should not be the goal but rather the maintenance of existing imbalances, which can be seen from profit and losses. Therefore, the sequence that leads away from equilibrium is precisely an ideal pattern for development. Unequal development of various sectors often generates conditions for rapid development. More-developed industries provide undeveloped industries an incentive to grow. Hence, development of underdeveloped countries should be based on this strategy.

The path of unbalanced growth is described by three phases:

1. Complementary
2. Induced investment
3. External economies

Singer believed that desirable investment programs always exist within a country that represent unbalanced investment to complement the existing imbalance. These investments create a new imbalance, requiring another balancing investment. One sector will always grow faster than another, so the need for unbalanced growth will continue as investments must complement existing imbalance. Hirschman states “If the economy is to be kept moving ahead, the task of development policy is to maintain tensions, disproportions and disequilibrium”. This situation exists for all societies, developed or underdeveloped.

== Complementarity ==
Complementarity is a situation where increased production of one good or service builds up demand for the second good or service. When the second product is privately produced, this demand will lead to imports or higher domestic production of the second product, as it will be in the interests of the producers to do so. Otherwise, the increased demand takes the form of political pressure. This is the case for such public services such as law and order, education, water and electricity that cannot reasonably be imported.

== Induced investment ==
Complementarity allows investment in one industry or sector to encourage investment in others. This concept of induced investment is like a multiplier, because each investment triggers a series of subsequent events. Convergence occurs as the output of external economies diminishes at each step. Growth sequences tend to move towards convergence or divergence and the policy is usually concerned with preventing rapid convergence and promoting the possibility of divergence.

== External economies ==
New projects often appropriate external economies created by preceding ventures and create external economies that may be utilized by subsequent ones. Sometimes the project undertaken creates external economies, causing private profit to fall short of what is socially desirable. The reverse is also possible. Some ventures have a larger input of external economies than the output. Therefore, Hirschman says, "the projects that fall into this category must be net beneficiaries of external economies".

== Social Overhead Capital ==
Social Overhead Capital (SOC) is defined as basic services without which primary, secondary and tertiary productive activities cannot function. In a narrow sense, Social Overhead Capital is defined to include transportation and electricity, while in a wider sense, it includes all public services, including law and order and education. Criteria for classifying an asset as Social Overhead Capital include:

- The services provided by the activity should facilitate a great variety of economic activities.
- The services provided should be subject to public control.
- The services cannot be imported.
- The investment needed to provide services should be characterized by some unevenness as well as by high capital output ratio.

== Development via capital imbalances ==
The strategy of unbalanced growth has been discussed within the frameworks of development through shortage of SOC and development through excess of SOC.

In the first case, the country invests in direct productive activities (DPA). Direct productive activity increases demand for SOC, inducing investment. In the second case, SOC expands, which reduces the cost of services, inducing investment in DPA.

The cost of producing any unit of output of DPA is inversely proportional to SOC. The economy's major objective is to attain increasing output of DPA.

One of the paradoxes of development is that poor countries cannot afford to be economical. According to Hirschman, resources are not scarce per se, but the ability to employ those resources may be lacking. To explain unbalanced growth, Hirschman assumes that the country invests in either DPA or SOC. Both paths set up incentives and an evaluation of their respective efficiency depends on the strengths of entrepreneurial motivations and the response to public pressure of the authorities responsible for SOC.

The major characteristic of the two paths of development is that they yield excess dividends. SOC built ahead of demand creates this demand by making a country more attractive to DPA investors. DPA that outpaces SOC development, creates demand to expand SOC. Balanced growth of DPA and SOC is not achievable in underdeveloped countries, nor it is not a desirable policy, as it does not set up the incentives and the pressure that make for this dividend of induced investment decisions.

== Backward and forward linkages ==
Hirschman introduces the concept of backward and forward linkages. A forward linkage is created when investment in a particular project encourages investment in subsequent stages of production. A backward linkage is created when a project encourages investment in facilities that enable the project to succeed. Normally, projects create both forward and backward linkages. Investment should be made in those projects that have the greatest total number of linkages. Hirschman called the industries with greatest complementarities as the 'leading sectors'. Projects with many linkages will vary from country to country; knowledge about project linkages can be obtained through input and output studies.

Most underdeveloped economies are primarily agrarian. Agriculture is typically at a primitive stage and hence possesses few linkages, as most output goes for consumption or exports. Therefore, it is said that underdeveloped countries are lacking in interdependence and linkages.

An example of an industry that has excellent forward and backward linkages is the steel industry. Backward linkages include coal and iron ore mining. Forward linkages include items such as canned goods. While this industry has strong linkages, it is not a good leading sector. Any industry that has a high capital/output ratio and causes significant costs to other businesses has the potential to hurt the developing economy more than it helps it. A better leading sector would be the beer industry.

== Linkages and last industries ==
The development of an economy using the unbalanced method depends on the linkages between sectors. Hirschman suggests that the best strategy is induced industrialization. This type of development will create more backward and forward linkages and should be the first step taken.

Industries that transform semi-manufactured goods into goods needed by final demand are called "last industries" or "enclave import industries".

In underdeveloped countries, industrialization takes place through such industries, through plants that add final touches to unfinished imported products. Examples are metal fabricating industries, pharmaceutical laboratories and assembly and mixing plants. Such industries have many advantages, as they often require the smaller amounts of capital available in such economies and without having to rely on unreliable domestic producers. Therefore, underdeveloped countries set up such "last industries" first. These industries create long chains of backward linkages. Colombia, Brazil and Mexico are examples of countries that followed this path.

Protection and subsidy of import-replacing industries should come, but at a later stage. The Last Industry Strategy has disadvantages. It can slow the creation of domestic production. Industrialists who have begun working with imports may not accept domestic alternative products that reduce demand for their output. Creating last industries first can create loyalty toward foreign products and distrust of domestic products and their quality. Banks may get used to extending credit for shorter, smaller capital requirements.

=== Disadvantages ===
Disadvantages of the last industry strategy include inhibition of domestic production as domestic demand grows. This is because industrialists who work with imported material will often be hostile to the establishment of domestic industries, because domestic goods are of lower quality, the number of domestic suppliers is small, downstream competition may intensify once inputs are available domestically and competitors may be able to locate closer to the upstream suppliers.

Last/first may accustom domestic consumers to imported goods, making it harder for local producers to find customers. Further, financing may be easier for import-based business.

== See also ==
- Infrastructure
