= Dual economy =

Economic concept

A dual economy is the existence of two separate economic sectors within one country, divided by different levels of development, technology, and different patterns of demand. The concept was originally created by Julius Herman Boeke to describe the coexistence of modern and traditional economic sectors in a colonial economy.

Dual economies are common in less developed countries, where one sector is geared towards local needs and another to the global export market. Dual economies may exist within the same sector, for example a modern plantation or other commercial agricultural entity operating in the midst of traditional cropping systems. Sir Arthur Lewis used the concept of a dualistic economy as the basis of his labour supply theory of rural-urban migration. Lewis distinguished between a rural low-income subsistence sector with surplus population, and an expanding urban capitalist sector (see Dual-sector model). The urban economy absorbed labor from rural areas (holding down urban wages) until the rural surplus was exhausted.

A World Bank comparison of sectoral growth in Côte d'Ivoire, Ghana and Zimbabwe since 1965 provided evidence against a basic dual economy model. The research implied that a positive link existed between growth in industry and growth in agriculture. The authors argued that for maximum economic growth, policymakers should have focused on agriculture and services as well as industrial development.

== See also ==
- Subsistence agriculture
- Labor market segmentation
