= Gilded Age =

Era of US history from the 1870s to the late 1890s

- 1870s – late 1890s
Reconstruction era	Progressive Era
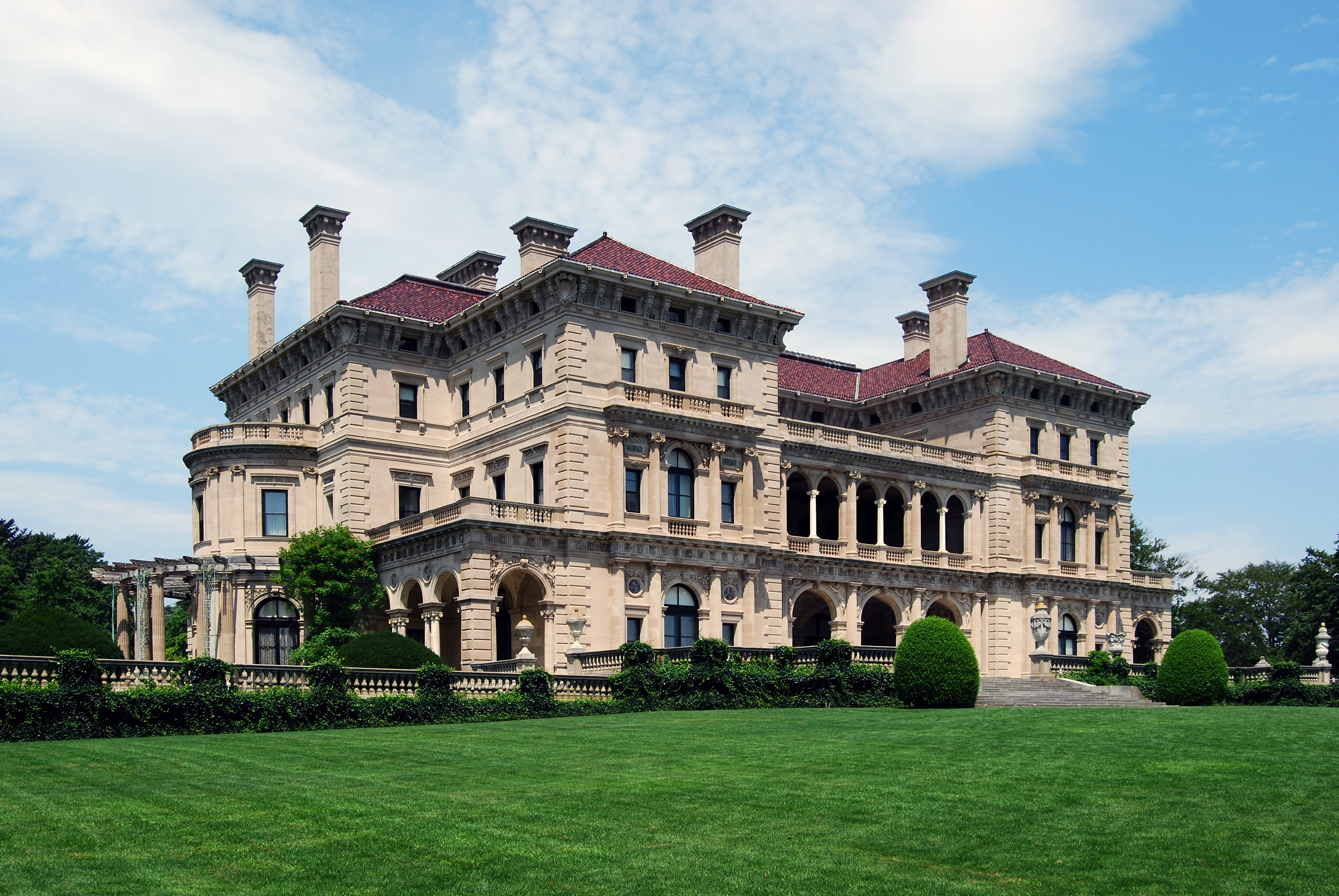
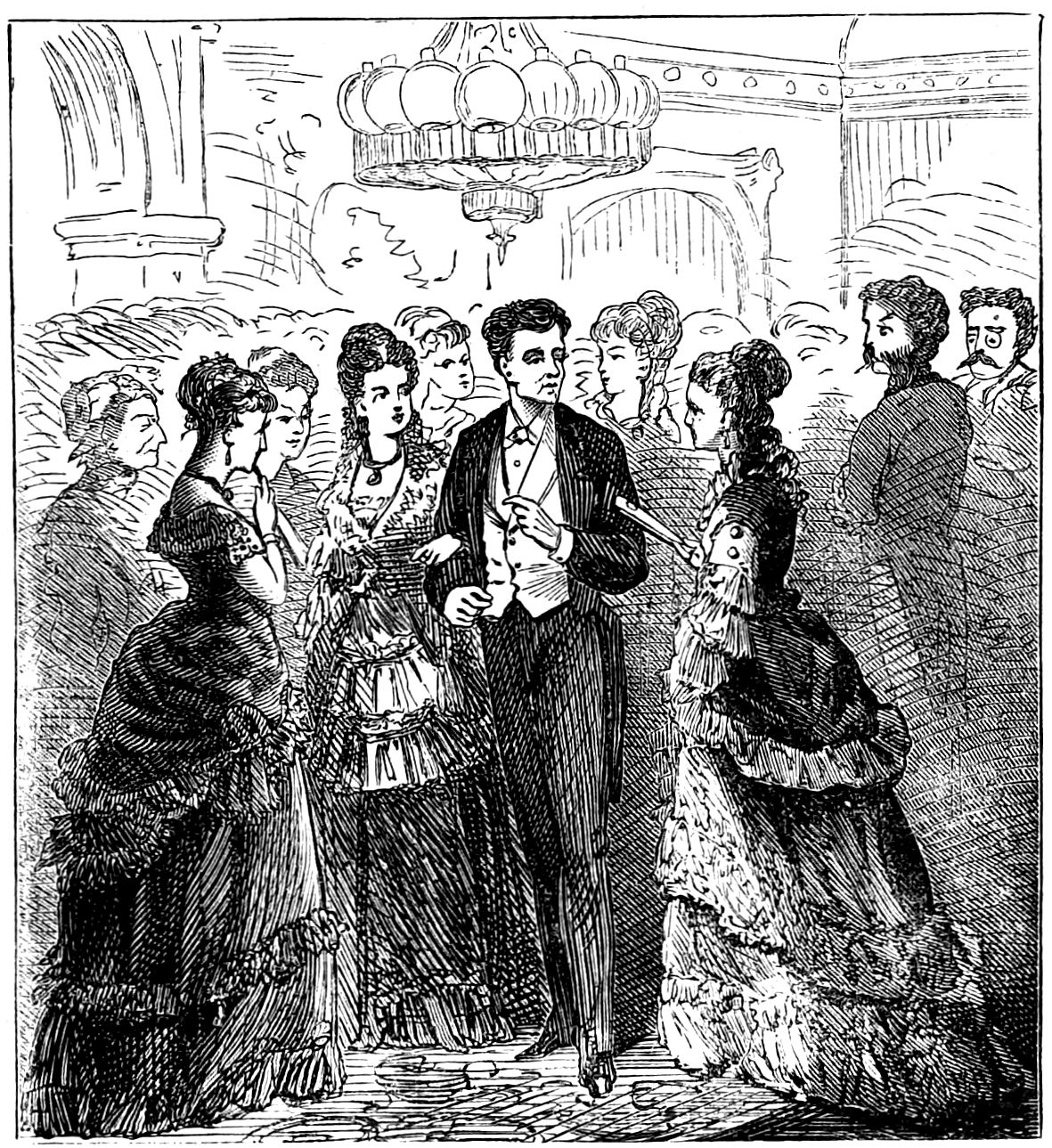
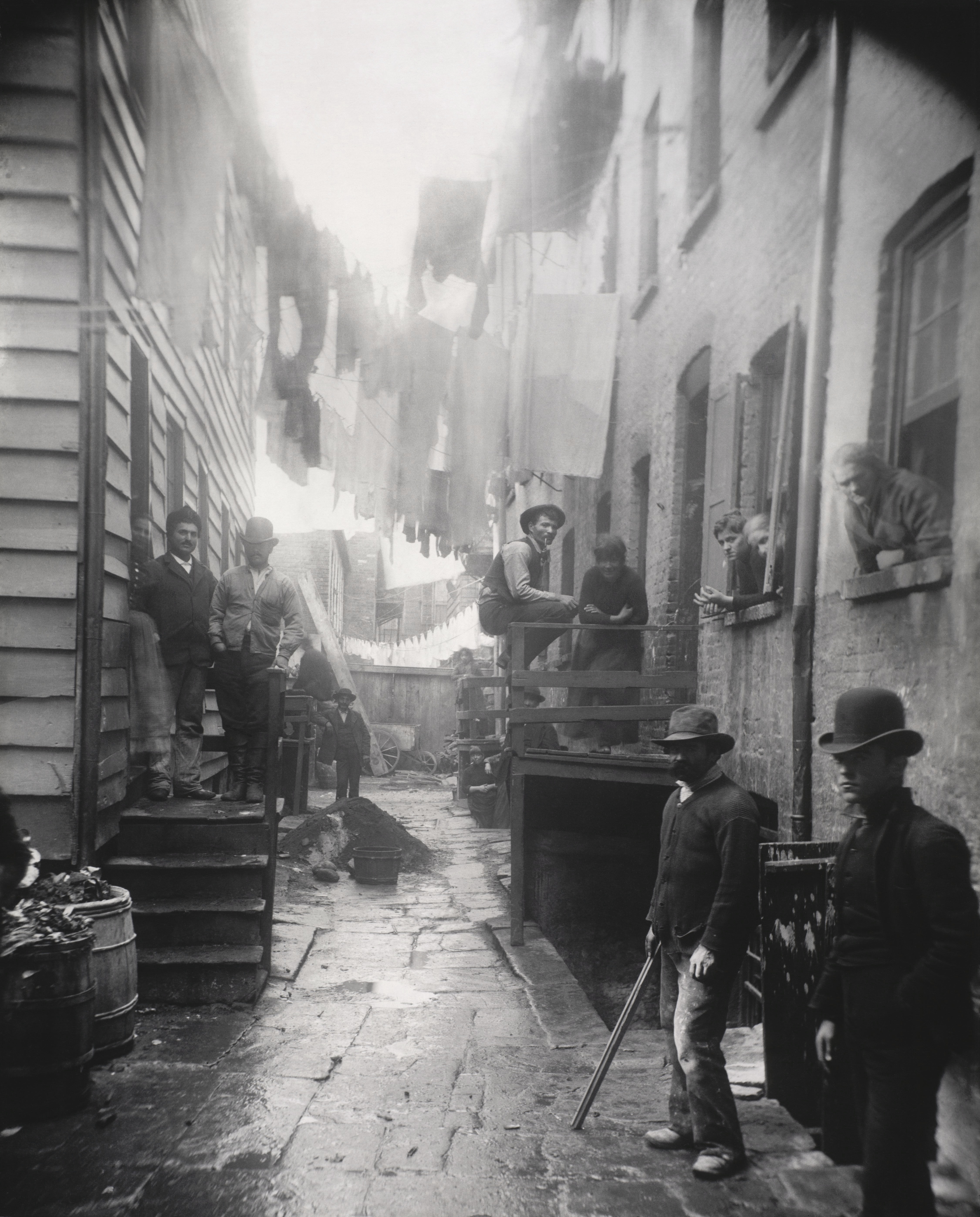
- From top to bottom and from left to right: The Breakers, the Vanderbilt family mansion; Illustration from The Gilded Age (1873); Slums of New York City, from How the Other Half Lives (1890)
- Location: United States
- Including: Nadir of race relations; Second Industrial Revolution; Third Party System
- Presidents: Ulysses S. Grant (1869–1877); Rutherford B. Hayes (1877–1881); James A. Garfield (1881); Chester A. Arthur (1881–1885); Grover Cleveland (1885–1889; 1893–1897); Benjamin Harrison (1889–1893); William McKinley (1897–1901)
- Key events: Robber barons; Farmers' movement; Gospel of Wealth; Invention of the telephone; Great Railroad Strike of 1877; Chinese Exclusion Act; Pendleton Act; Haymarket affair; Founding of the AFL; Sherman Antitrust Act; Homestead Strike; Pullman strike

In United States history, the Gilded Age is the period from about the late 1870s to the late 1890s, which occurred between the Reconstruction era and the Progressive Era. It was named by 1920s historians after Mark Twain's 1873 novel The Gilded Age: A Tale of Today.

It was a time of rapid economic and capital growth, especially in the North and West. As American wages grew much higher than those in Europe, especially for skilled workers, and industry demanded an increasingly skilled labor force, the period saw an influx of millions of European immigrants. The rapid expansion of industrialization led to real wage growth of 40% from 1860 to 1890, spreading across the expanding labor force. The Gilded Age was also an era of visible poverty. Though some earned more, the actual purchasing power advantage for many workers was somewhat smaller than raw wage comparisons suggest, especially accounting for comparatively high rents. Immigrants typically settled in industrial centers, and many planned to return to Europe with their earnings. Spending was therefore kept to a minimum, leading many to crowd into unsanitary tenements. Many Americans had sewing machines, phonographs, and even electric lights, yet a significant number labored in the shadow of poverty especially in the South. Economic inequality grew as the concentration of wealth became more visible and contentious, with urban slums developing and growing during this era.

Railroads were the major growth industry, with the factory system, oil, mining, and finance increasing in importance. Immigration from Europe and migration from the Eastern United States, combined with hundreds of millions of acres of land given to settlers by the federal government for free through the Homestead Acts, led to the rapid growth of the West based on farming, ranching, and mining. Labor unions became increasingly important in the rapidly growing and industrializing cities. Two short nationwide depressions—the Panic of 1873 and the Panic of 1893—briefly interrupted growth and caused violent labor strife.

The South remained economically devastated after the American Civil War. The South's economy became increasingly tied to commodities like food and building materials, cotton for thread and fabrics, and tobacco production, all of which suffered from low prices. With the end of the Reconstruction era in 1877 and the rise of Jim Crow laws, African American people in the South were stripped of political power and voting rights and were left severely economically disadvantaged. Nationally, African Americans endured the period as the nadir of American race relations.

The political landscape was notable in that despite rampant corruption, election turnout was comparatively high among all classes (though the extent of the franchise was generally limited to men), and national elections featured two similarly sized parties. The dominant issues were cultural (especially regarding prohibition, education, and ethnic or racial groups) and economic (tariffs and money supply). Urban politics were tied to rapidly growing industrial cities, which increasingly fell under control of political machines. In business, powerful nationwide trusts formed in many major industries, stifling competition in the market and some even effectively creating monopolies. The consequential amassing of a huge portion of the nation's wealth by a few "robber barons" resulted in their correspondingly enormous influence in politics, government, economy and society in general. Unions crusaded for the eight-hour working day, workplace health and safety laws, and the abolition of child labor; middle-class reformers demanded civil service reform, food and drug purity and public health, prohibition of liquor and beer, and women's suffrage.

Local governments across the North and West built public schools chiefly at the elementary level; public high schools started to emerge. The numerous religious denominations were growing in membership and wealth, with Catholicism becoming the largest. They all expanded their missionary activity to the world arena. Catholics, Lutherans, and Episcopalians set up religious schools, and the largest of those schools set up numerous colleges, hospitals, and charities. Many of the problems faced by society, especially the poor, gave rise to attempted reforms in the subsequent Progressive Era.

== Terminology ==
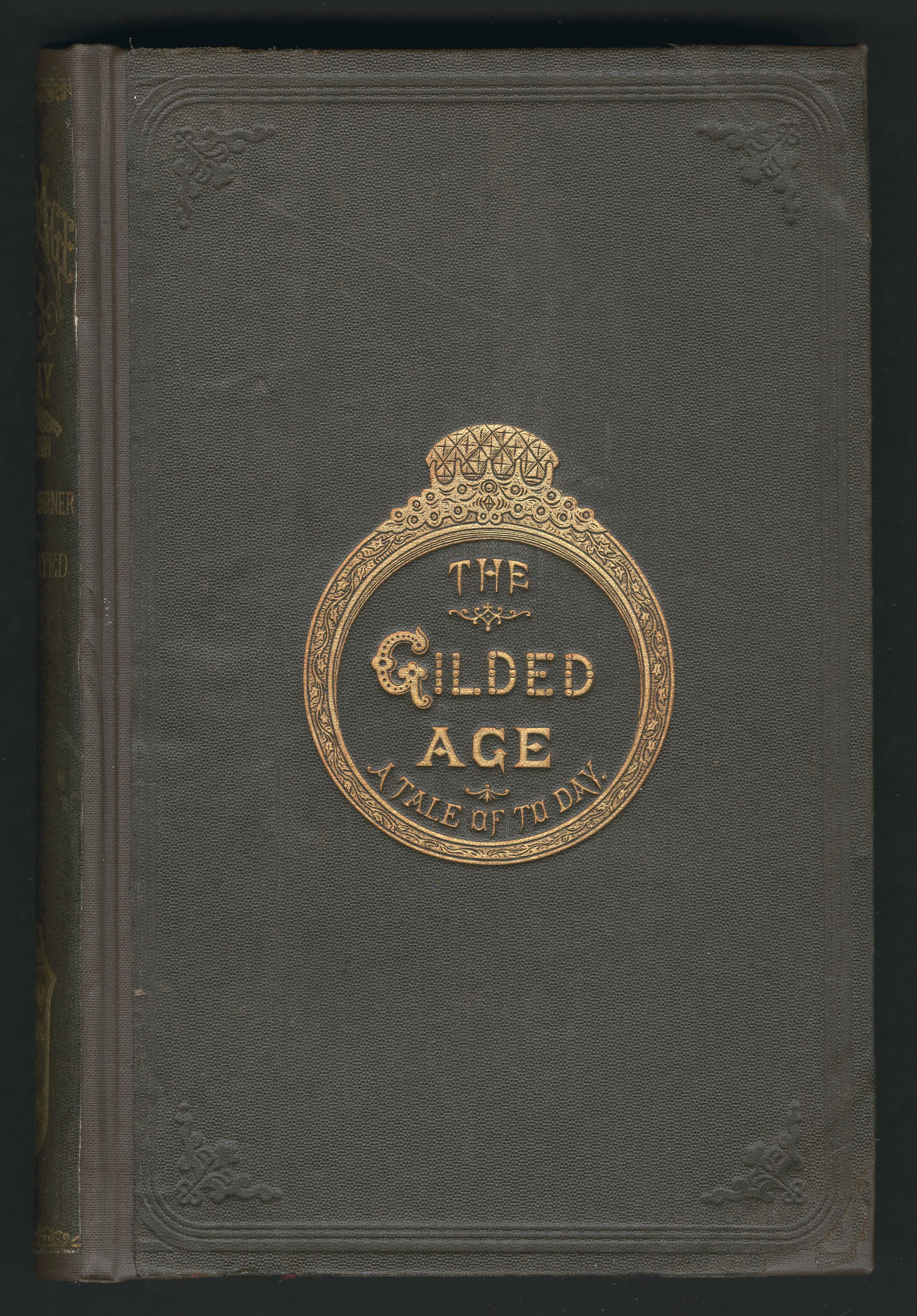
First edition cover of The Gilded Age: A Tale of Today (1873), a collaborative novel by Mark Twain and Charles Dudley Warner

The term Gilded Age was applied to the era by 1920s historians who took the term from one of Mark Twain's lesser-known novels, The Gilded Age: A Tale of Today (1873). The book, co-written with Charles Dudley Warner, satirizes the promised "golden age" after the Civil War, portrayed as an era of serious social problems masked by a thin gold gilding of economic expansion. In the 1920s, and 1930s, the metaphor "Gilded Age" began to be applied to a designated period in American history. The term was adopted by literary and cultural critics as well as historians, including Van Wyck Brooks, Lewis Mumford, Charles Austin Beard, Mary Ritter Beard, Vernon Louis Parrington, and Matthew Josephson. For them, Gilded Age was a pejorative term for a time of materialistic excesses and widespread political corruption.

The early half of the Gilded Age roughly coincided with the middle portion of the Victorian era in Britain and the Belle Époque in France. With respect to eras of American history, historical views vary as to when the Gilded Age began, ranging from starting right after the Civil War ended in 1865, or 1873, or as the Reconstruction era ended in 1877. The date marking the end of the Gilded Age also varies, generally given as the beginning of the Progressive Era in the 1890s (sometimes as the United States presidential election of 1896).

== Industrial and technological changes ==
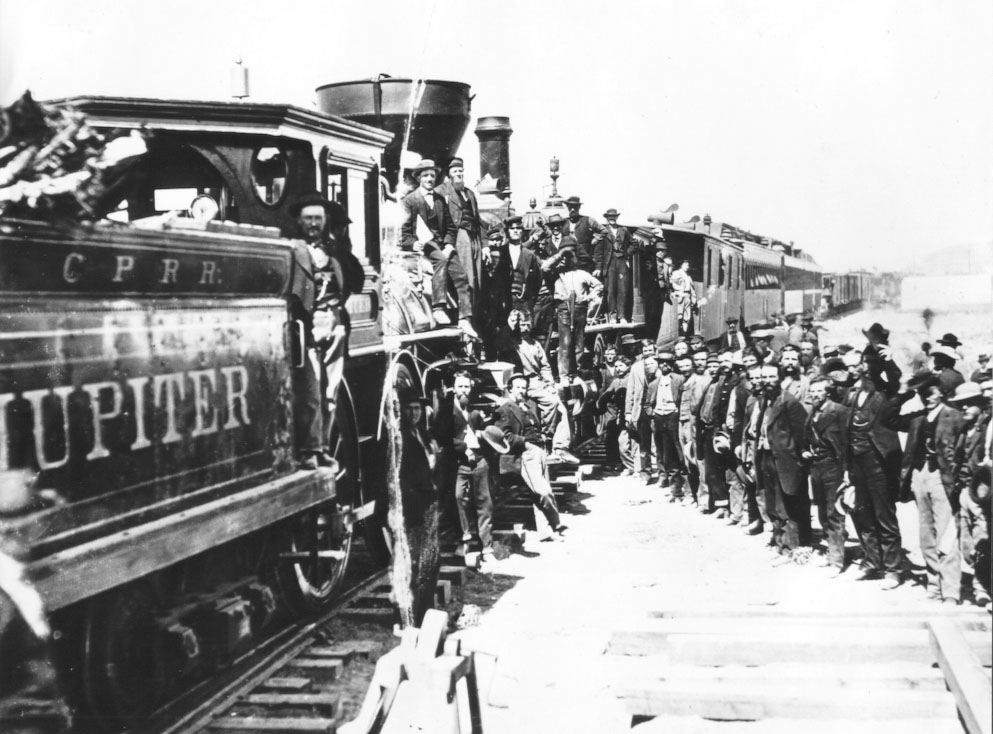
The celebration of the completion of the first transcontinental railroad, May 10, 1869

=== Technological advances ===
The era was a period of economic growth as the United States jumped to the lead in industrialization ahead of Britain. The nation was rapidly expanding its economy into new areas, especially heavy industry like factories, railroads, and coal mining. In 1869, the first transcontinental railroad opened up mining and ranching in the Western United States. Travel from New York to San Francisco then took six days instead of six months. Railroad track mileage tripled from 1860 to 1880, and then doubled again by 1920. The new track linked formerly isolated areas with larger markets and allowed for the rise of commercial farming, ranching, and mining, creating a truly national marketplace. Steel production rose to surpass the combined totals of Britain, Germany, and France.

Investors in London and Paris poured money into the railroads through the American financial market centered in Wall Street. By 1900, the process of economic concentration had extended into most branches of industry—a few large corporations, called "trusts", dominated in steel, oil, sugar, meat, and farm machinery. Through vertical integration these trusts were able to control each aspect of the production of a specific good, ensuring that the profits made on the finished product were maximized and prices minimized, and by controlling access to the raw materials, prevented other companies from being able to compete in the marketplace. Several monopolies—most famously Standard Oil—came to dominate their markets by keeping prices low when competitors appeared; they grew at a rate four times faster than that of the competitive sectors.

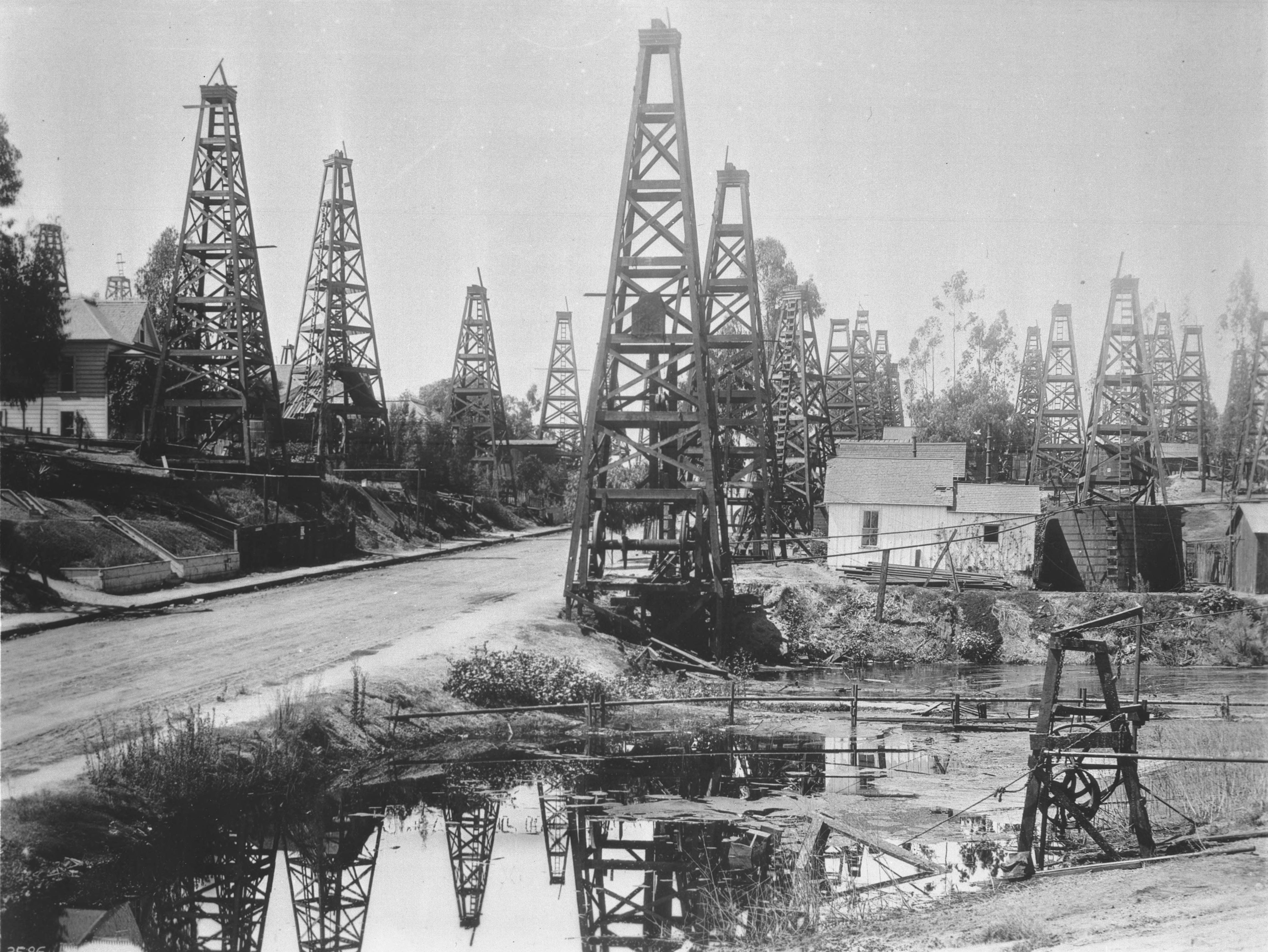
The Toluca Street Oil Field in Los Angeles oil district, 1900

Increased mechanization of industry is a major mark of the search for cheaper ways to create more product. Frederick Winslow Taylor observed that worker efficiency in steel could be improved through the use of very close observations with a stop watch to eliminate wasted effort. Mechanization made some factories an assemblage of unskilled laborers performing simple and repetitive tasks under the direction of skilled foremen and engineers. Machine shops grew rapidly, and they comprised skilled workers and engineers. Both the number of unskilled and skilled workers increased as their wage rates grew.

Engineering colleges were established to feed the demand for expertise, many through the federal government sponsored Morrill Land-Grant Acts passed to stimulate public education, particularly in the agricultural and technical ("Ag & Tech") fields. Railroads, which had previously invented railway time to standardize time zones, production, and lifestyles, created modern management with clear chains of command, statistical reporting, and complex bureaucratic systems. They systematized the roles of middle managers and set up explicit career tracks for both skilled blue-collar jobs and for white-collar managers. These advances spread from railroads into finance, manufacturing, and trade. Together with rapid growth of small business, a new middle class was rapidly growing, especially in northern cities.

The nation became a world leader in applied technology. From 1860 to 1890, 500,000 patents were issued—over ten times the number granted in the previous 70 years. George Westinghouse invented air brakes for trains, making them both safer and faster. Theodore Vail established the American Telephone & Telegraph Company and built a great communications network. Elisha Otis developed the elevator, allowing the construction of skyscrapers and the concentration of ever greater populations in urban centers. Thomas Edison, in addition to inventing hundreds of devices, established the first electrical lighting utility, basing it on direct current and an efficient incandescent lamp. Electric power delivery spread rapidly across cities. The streets were lit at night, and electric streetcars allowed for faster commuting to work and easier shopping.

Petroleum launched a new industry beginning with the Pennsylvania oil fields in the 1860s. The United States dominated the global industry into the 1950s. Kerosene replaced whale oil and candles for lighting homes. John D. Rockefeller founded Standard Oil Company and monopolized the oil industry. It mostly produced kerosene before the automobile created a demand for gasoline in the 20th century.

=== Railroads ===
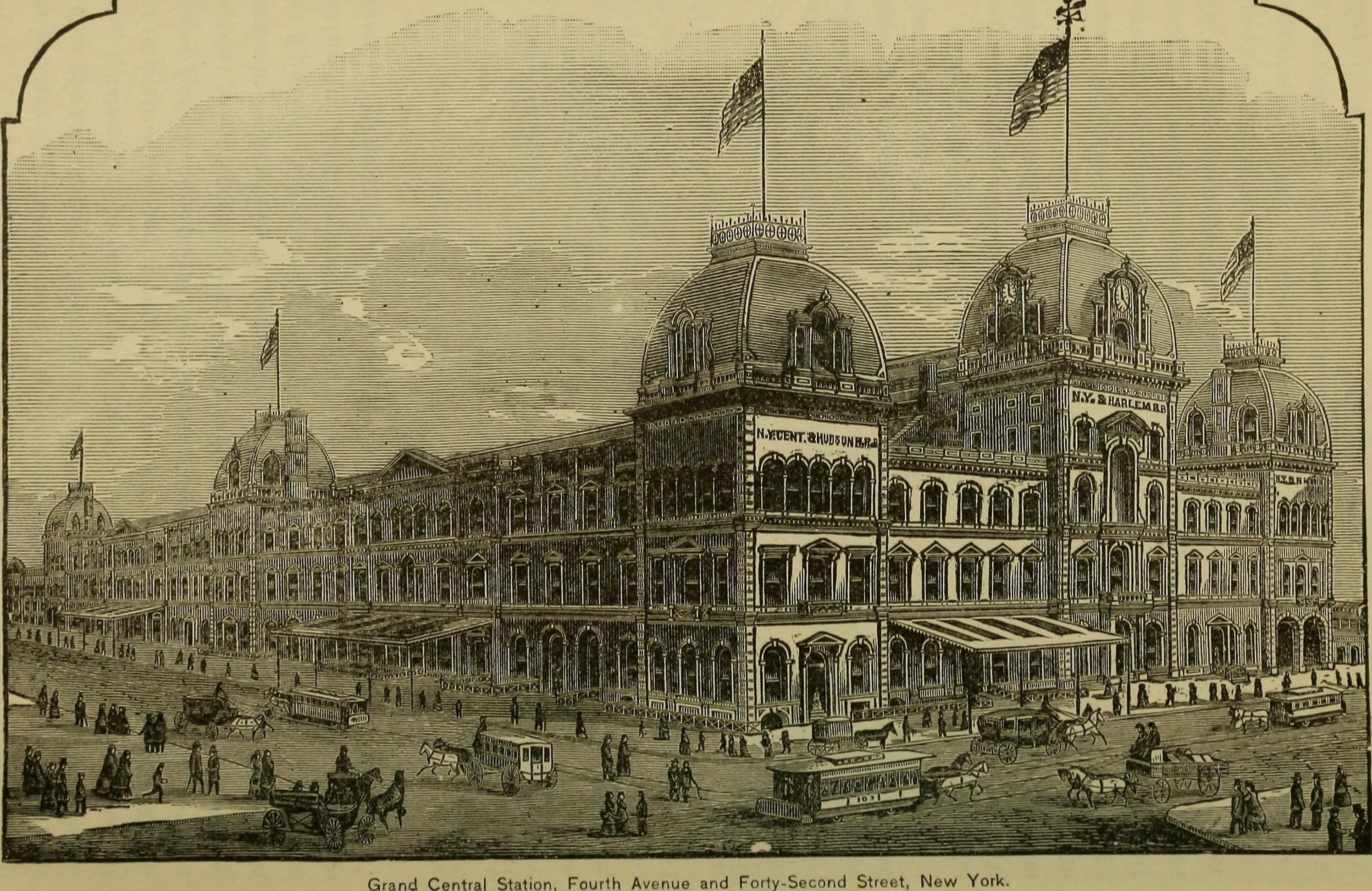
Grand Central Depot in New York City, opened in 1871

According to historian Henry Adams the system of railroads needed:

the energies of a generation, for it required all the new machinery to be created—capital, banks, mines, furnaces, shops, power-houses, technical knowledge, mechanical population, together with a steady remodelling of social and political habits, ideas, and institutions to fit the new scale and suit the new conditions. The generation from 1865 to 1895 was already mortgaged to the railways, and no one knew it better than the generation itself.

The impact can be examined through five aspects: shipping, finance, management, careers, and popular reaction.

==== Shipping freight and passengers ====
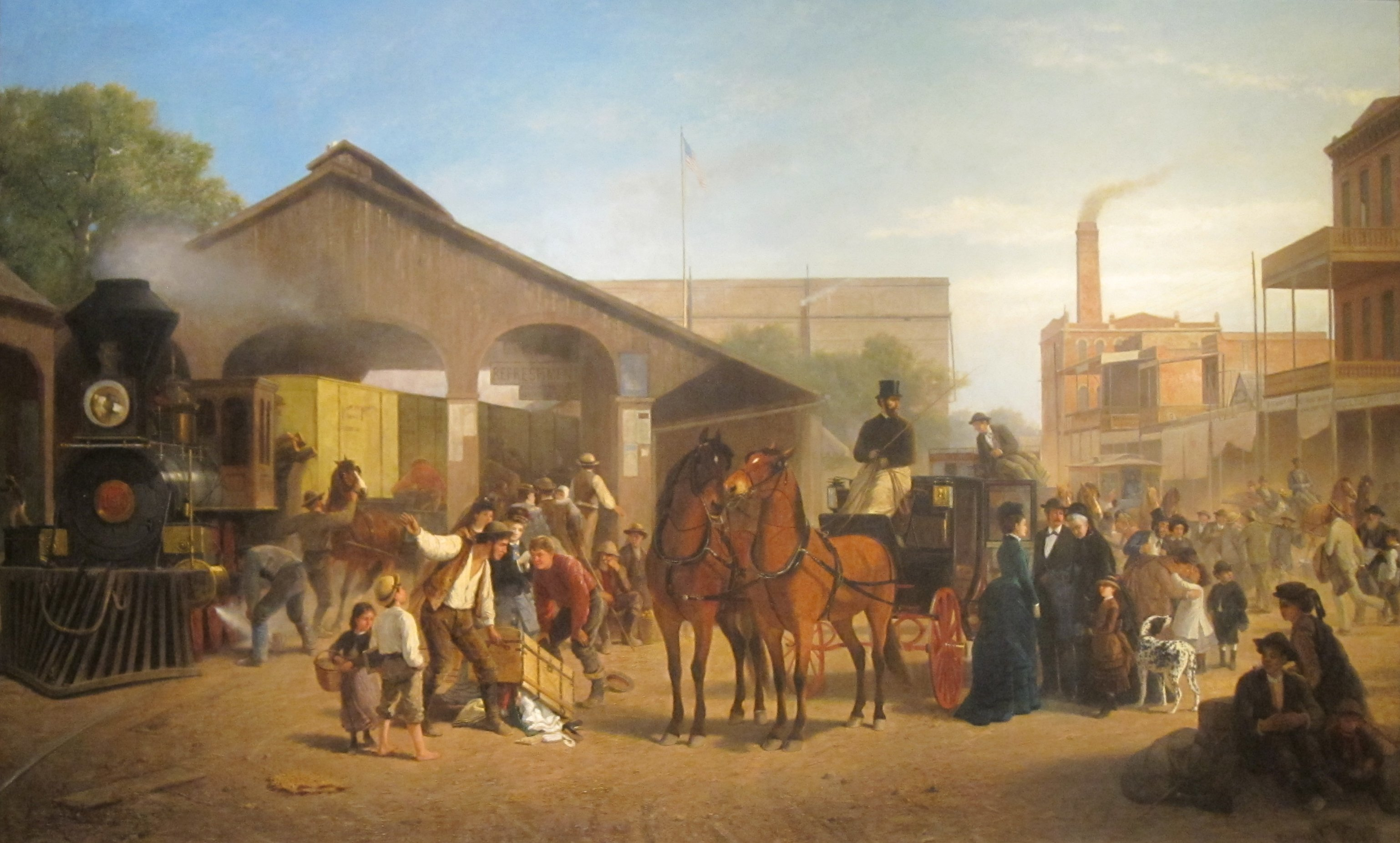
Sacramento Railroad Station in 1874

Railroads provided a highly efficient network for shipping freight and passengers throughout the U.S., spurring the evolution of a large national market. This had a transformative impact on most sectors of the economy including manufacturing, retail and wholesale, agriculture, and finance. The result was an integrated market practically the size of Europe's, with no internal barriers, tariffs, or language barriers to hamper it, and a common financial and legal system to support it.

==== Basis of the private financial system ====
Railroad financing provided the basis for a dramatic expansion of the private financial system. Construction of railroads was far more expensive than factories. In 1860, the combined total of railroad company shares and bonds was $1.8 billion. In 1897, it reached $10.6 billion, compared to the US national debt of $1.2 billion. Funding came primarily from private finance throughout the Northeast and from Europe, especially Britain, with about 10 percent coming from the federal government, especially in the form of land grants that could be realized when a certain amount of trackage was opened. The emerging American financial system was based on railroad bonds. By 1860, New York was the dominant financial market. The British invested heavily in railroads around the world but nowhere more so than the United States. British investment came to about $3 billion by 1914. In 1914–1917, they liquidated their American assets to pay for war supplies.

==== Inventing modern management ====
Railroad management designed complex systems that could handle far more complicated simultaneous relationships than could be dreamed of by the local factory owner who could patrol every part of his own factory in a matter of hours. Civil engineers became the senior management of railroads. The leading innovators were the Western Railroad of Massachusetts and the Baltimore and Ohio Railroad in the 1840s, the Erie in the 1850s, and the Pennsylvania in the 1860s.

==== Career paths ====
The railroads invented the career path in the private sector for both blue- and white-collar workers. Railroading became a lifetime career for young men; women were rarely hired. A typical career path would see a young man hired at age 18 as a shop laborer and promoted to skilled mechanic at age 24, brakeman at 25, freight conductor at 27, and passenger conductor at age 57. White-collar career paths likewise were delineated. Educated young men started in clerical or statistical work and moved up to station agents or bureaucrats at the divisional or central headquarters.

At each level they had more and more knowledge, experience, and human capital. They were very hard to replace and were virtually guaranteed permanent jobs and provided with insurance and medical care. Hiring, firing, and wage rates were set not by foremen but by central administrators, to minimize favoritism and personality conflicts. Everything was done by the book, whereby an increasingly complex set of rules dictated to everyone exactly what should be done in every circumstance, and exactly what their rank and pay would be. By the 1880s the career railroaders were retiring, and pension systems were invented to provide for them.

==== Railroad controversy ====
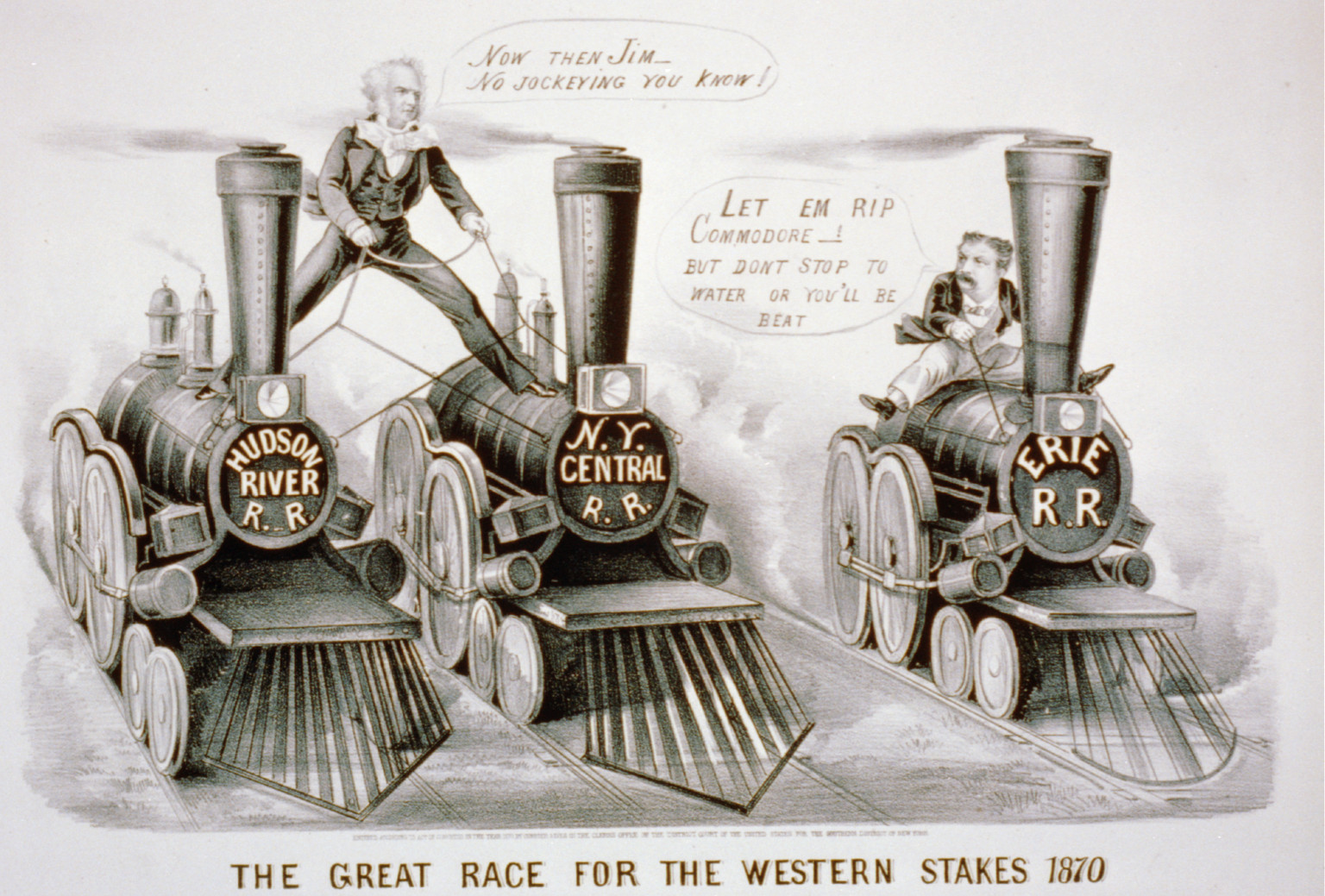
Cornelius Vanderbilt versus James Fisk Jr. in a famous rivalry with the Erie Railroad

America developed a love-hate relationship with railroads. Boosters in every city worked feverishly to make sure the railroad came through, knowing their urban dreams depended upon it. The mechanical size, scope, and efficiency of the railroads made a profound impression; people dressed in their Sunday best to go down to the terminal to watch the train come in. Travel became much easier, cheaper, and more common. Shoppers from small towns could make day trips to big city stores. Hotels, resorts, and tourist attractions were built to accommodate the demand. The realization that anyone could buy a ticket for a thousand-mile trip was empowering. Historians Gary Cross and Rick Szostak argue:

With the freedom to travel came a greater sense of national identity and a reduction in regional cultural diversity. Farm children could more easily acquaint themselves with the big city, and easterners could readily visit the West. It is hard to imagine a United States of continental proportions without the railroad.

The civil and mechanical engineers became model citizens, bringing their can-do spirit and their systematic work effort to all phases of the economy as well as local and national government. By 1910, major cities were building magnificent palatial railroad stations, such as Pennsylvania Station in New York City and Union Station in Washington, D.C.

There was also a dark side. By the 1870s railroads were vilified by Western farmers who absorbed the Granger movement theme that monopolistic carriers controlled too much pricing power, and that the state legislatures had to regulate maximum prices. Local merchants and shippers supported the demand and got some "Granger Laws" passed. Anti-railroad complaints were loudly repeated in late 19th century political rhetoric.

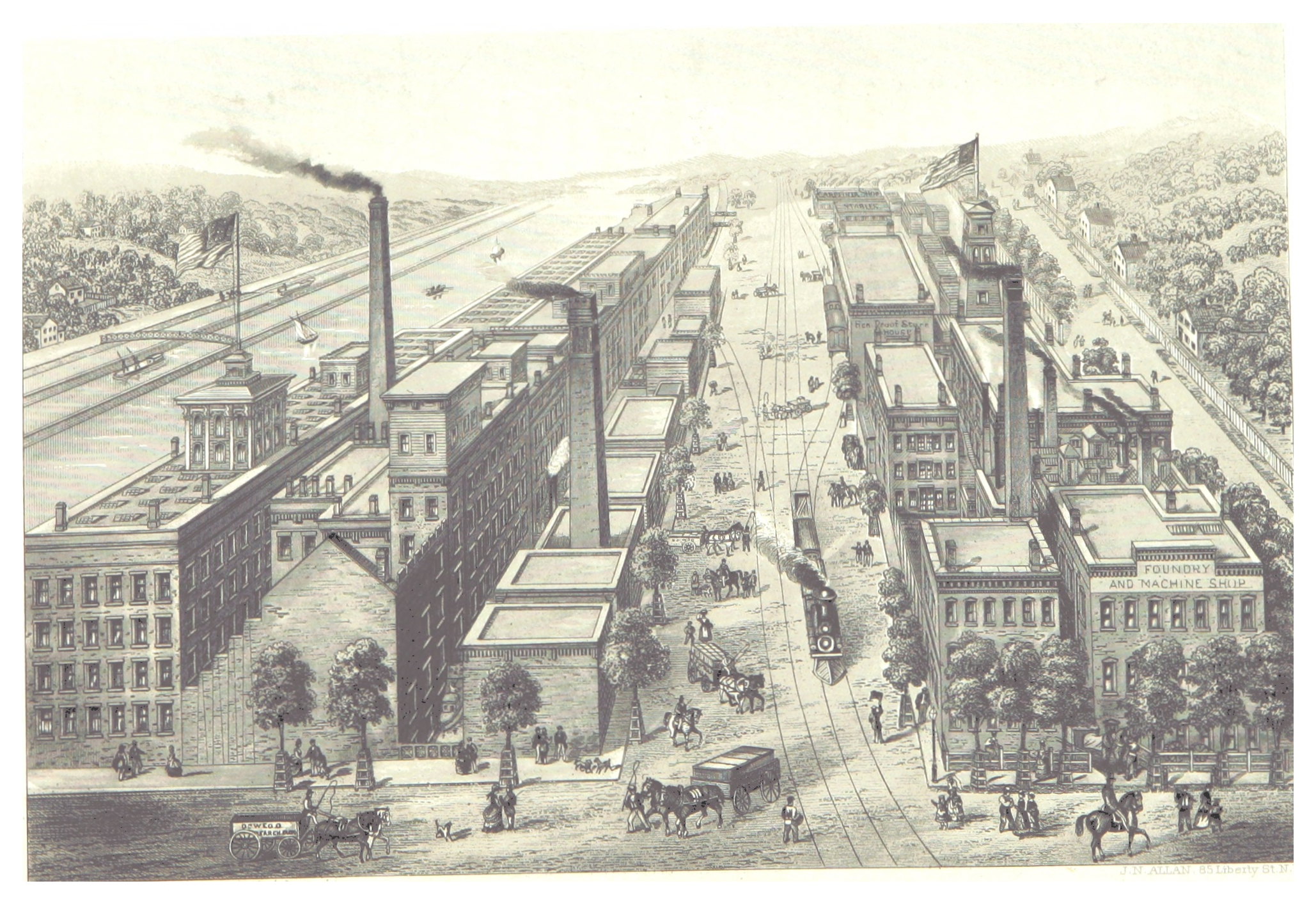
The Oswego starch factory in Oswego, New York, 1876

One of the most hated railroad men in the country was Collis P. Huntington, the president of the Southern Pacific Railroad, who dominated California's economy and politics. One textbook argues: "Huntington came to symbolize the greed and corruption of late-nineteenth-century business. Business rivals and political reformers accused him of every conceivable evil. Journalists and cartoonists made their reputations by pillorying him.... Historians have cast Huntington as the state's most despicable villain." However Huntington defended himself: "The motives back of my actions have been honest ones and the results have redounded far more to the benefit of California than they have to my own."

==== Impact on farming ====
The growth of railroads from 1850s to 1880s made commercial farming much more feasible and profitable. Millions of acres were opened to settlement once the railroad was nearby and provided a long-distance outlet for wheat, cattle and hogs that reached all the way to Europe. Rural America became one giant market, as wholesalers bought the consumer products produced by the factories in the East and shipped them to local merchants in small stores nationwide. Shipping live animals was slow and expensive. It was more efficient to slaughter them in major packing centers such as Chicago, Kansas City, St. Louis, Milwaukee, and Cincinnati, and then ship dressed meat out in refrigerated freight cars. The cars were cooled by slabs of ice that had been harvested from the northern lakes in wintertime and stored for summer and fall usage. Chicago, the main railroad center, benefited enormously, with Kansas City a distant second. Historian William Cronon concludes:

Because of the Chicago packers, ranchers in Wyoming and feedlot farmers in Iowa regularly found a reliable market for their animals, and on average received better prices for the animals they sold there. At the same time and for the same reason, Americans of all classes found a greater variety of more and better meats on their tables, purchased on average at lower prices than ever before. Seen in this light, the packers' "rigid system of economy" seemed a very good thing indeed.

=== Economic growth ===
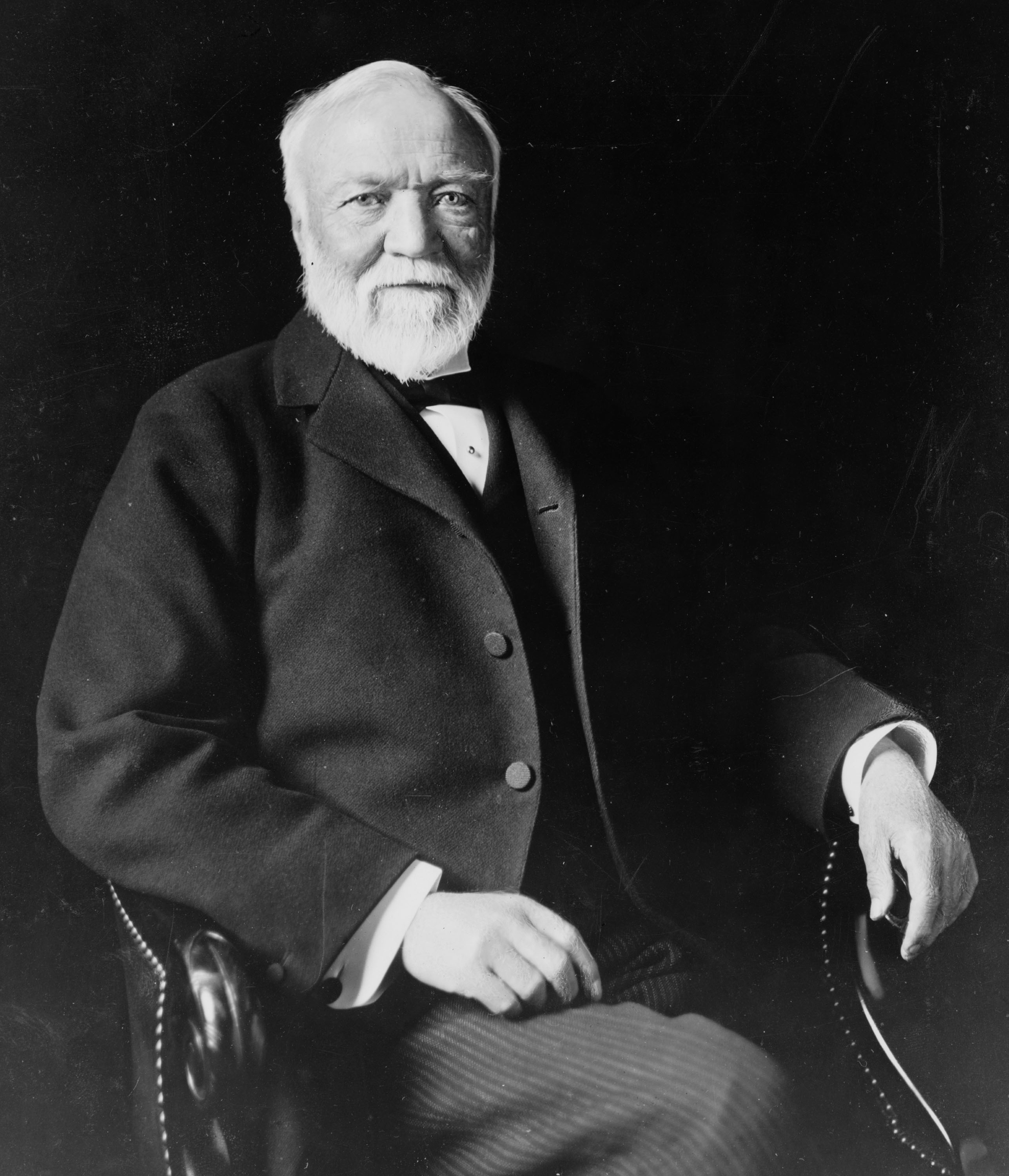
Scottish immigrant Andrew Carnegie led the enormous expansion of the American steel industry.

During the 1870s and 1880s, the U.S. economy rose at the fastest rate in its history, with real wages, wealth, GDP, and capital formation all increasing rapidly. For example, from 1865 to 1898, the output of wheat increased by 256%, corn by 222%, coal by 800%, and miles of railway track by 567%. Thick national networks for transportation and communication were created. The corporation became the dominant form of business organization, and a scientific management revolution transformed business operations.

By the beginning of the 20th century, GDP and industrial production in the United States led the world. Kennedy reports "U.S. national income, in absolute figures in per capita, was so far above everybody else's by 1914." Per capita income was $377 in 1914 compared to Britain in second place at $244, Germany at $184, France at $153, and Italy at $108, while Russia and Japan trailed far behind at $41 and $36.

London remained the financial center of the world until 1914, yet the United States' growth caused foreigners to ask, as British author W. T. Stead wrote in 1901, "What is the secret of American success?" The businessmen of the Second Industrial Revolution created industrial towns and cities in the Northeast with new factories, and hired an ethnically diverse industrial working class, many of them new immigrants from Europe.

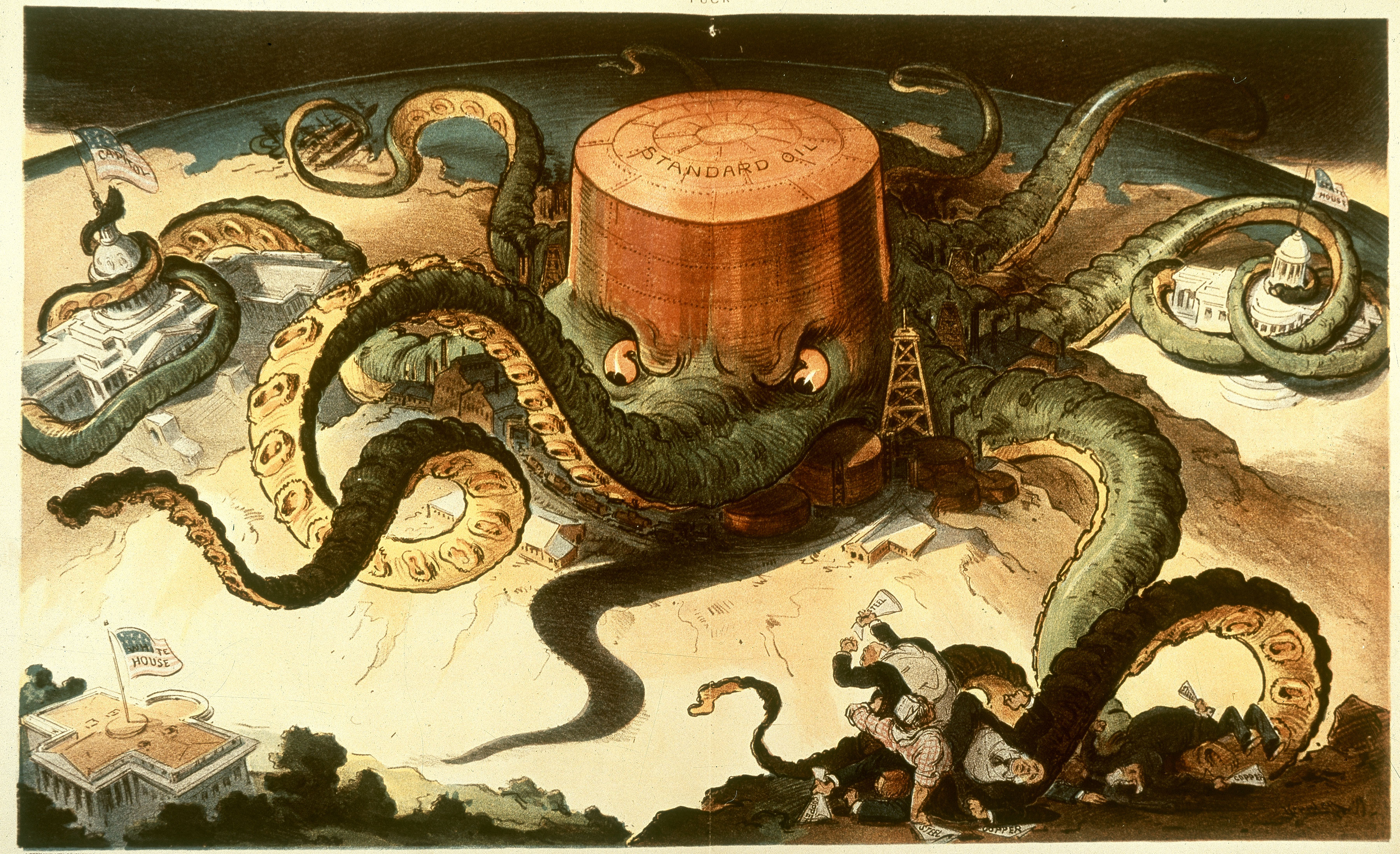
An octopus representing Standard Oil with tentacles wrapped around Congress and state capitals, as well as the steel, copper, and shipping industries, and reaching for the White House. 1904 cartoon by Udo Keppler.

Wealthy industrialists and financiers such as would sometimes be labeled "robber barons" by their critics, who argue their fortunes were made at the expense of the working class, by chicanery and a betrayal of democracy. Their admirers argued that they were "captains of industry" who built the core America industrial economy and also the non-profit sector through acts of philanthropy.

For instance, Andrew Carnegie donated over 90% of his wealth and said that philanthropy was their duty—"The Gospel of Wealth". Private money endowed thousands of colleges, hospitals, museums, academies, schools, opera houses, public libraries, and charities. John D. Rockefeller donated over $500 million to various charities, over half his net worth. Reflecting this, many business leaders were influenced by Herbert Spencer's theory of social Darwinism, which justified laissez-faire capitalism, competition and social stratification.

This emerging industrial economy quickly expanded to meet the new market demands. From 1869 to 1879, the U.S. economy grew at a rate of 6.8% for NNP (GDP minus capital depreciation) and 4.5% for NNP per capita. The economy repeated this period of growth in the 1880s, in which the wealth of the nation grew at an annual rate of 3.8%, while the GDP was also doubled. Libertarian economist Milton Friedman states that for the 1880s, "The highest decadal rate [of growth of real reproducible, tangible wealth per head from 1805 to 1950] for periods of about ten years was apparently reached in the eighties with approximately 3.8 percent."

=== Wages ===
The rapid expansion of industrialization led to real wage growth of 60% from 1860 to 1890, spread across the increasing labor force. Real wages, adjusting for inflation, rose steadily, with the percentage increase depending on the dates and the specific work force. The Census Bureau reported in 1892 that the average annual wage per industrial worker, including men, women, and children, rose from $380 in 1880 to $564 in 1890, a gain of 48%. Economic historian Clarence D. Long estimates that in terms of constant 1914 dollars, the average annual incomes of all American non-farm employees rose from $375 in 1870, to $395 in 1880, $519 in 1890 and $573 in 1900, a gain of 53% in 30 years. In New Haven, Connecticut, the average annual wage per industrial worker rose from $380 in 1880 to $584 in 1890, a rise of 54%, although some of that can be explained by higher paid men replacing lower paid women and children in the work force. After adjusting for the decline in retail prices, there was a gain of 59%.

Australian historian Peter Shergold found that the standard of living for U.S. industrial workers was higher than in Europe. He compared wages and the standard of living in Pittsburgh with Birmingham, one of the richest industrial cities of Europe. After taking account of the cost of living, which was 65% higher in the U.S., he found the standard of living of unskilled workers was about the same in the two cities. Skilled workers in Pittsburgh had about 50% to 100% higher standard of living as those in Birmingham. Warren B. Catlin proposed that the natural resources and virgin lands that were available in America acted as a safety valve for poorer workers, hence employers had to pay higher wages to hire labor. According to Shergold the American advantage grew over time from 1890 to 1914, and the perceived higher American wage led to a heavy steady flow of skilled workers from Britain to industrial America. According to historian Steve Fraser, workers generally earned less than $800 per year, which kept them mired in poverty. Workers had to put in roughly 60 hours a week to earn this much.

Wage labor was widely condemned as "wage slavery" in the working class press, and labor leaders almost always used the phrase in their speeches. As the shift towards wage labor gained momentum, working class organizations became more militant in their efforts to "strike down the whole system of wages for labor." In 1886, economist and New York Mayoral candidate Henry George, author of Progress and Poverty, stated "Chattel slavery is dead, but industrial slavery remains."

=== Wealth disparity ===
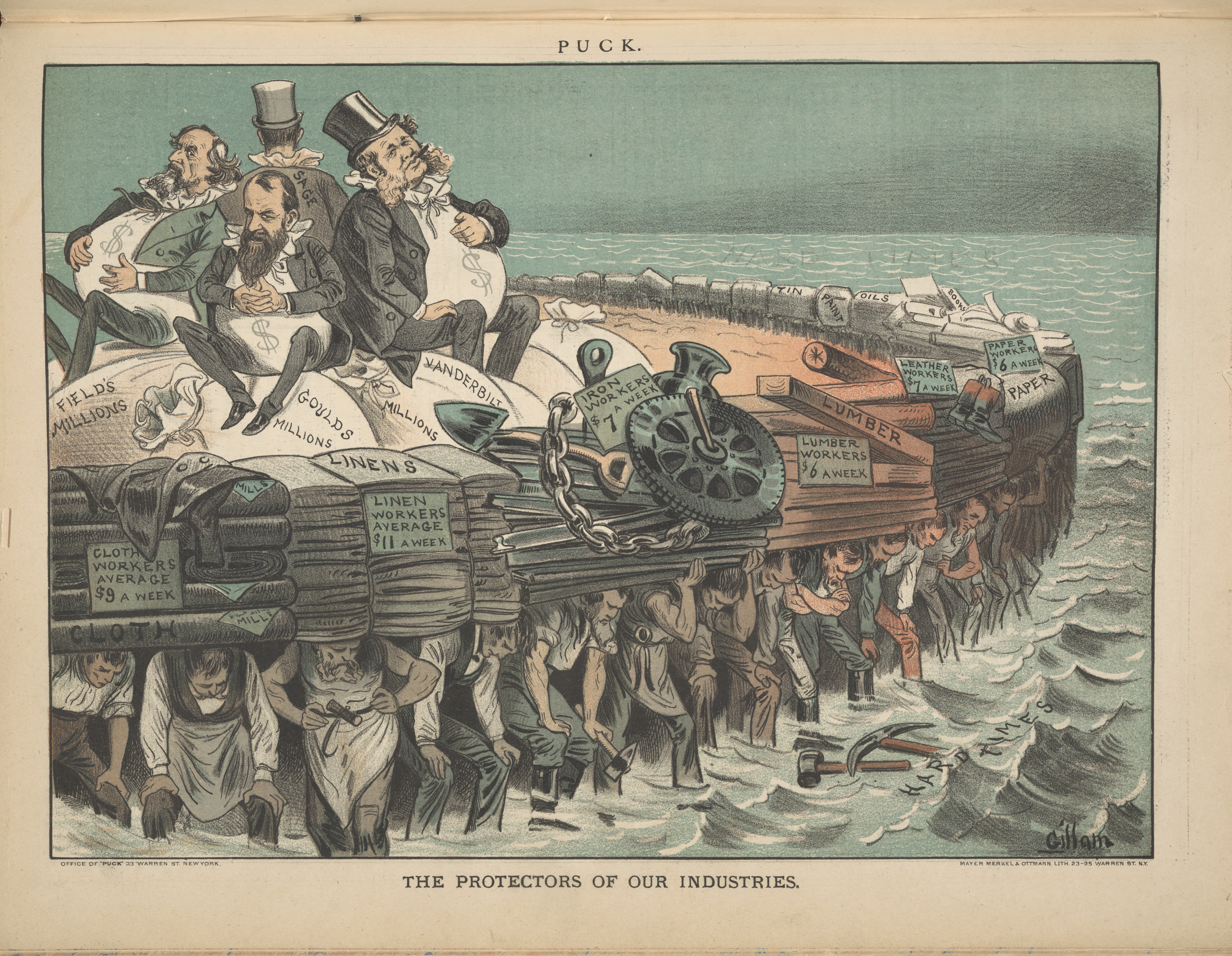
An 1883 Puck magazine cartoon showing Cyrus Field, Jay Gould, William H. Vanderbilt, and Russell Sage, protected from a sea of "hard times" by an island of personal wealth and low wages that is supported on the backs of workers

The unequal distribution of wealth remained high during this period. From 1860 to 1900, the wealthiest 2% of American households owned more than a third of the nation's wealth, while the top 10% owned roughly three-quarters of it. The bottom 40% had no wealth at all. In terms of property, the wealthiest 1% owned 51%, while the bottom 44% claimed 1.1%.

Historian Howard Zinn argues that this disparity along with precarious working and living conditions for the working classes prompted the rise of populist, anarchist, and socialist movements. French economist Thomas Piketty notes that economists during this time, such as Willford I. King, were concerned that the U.S. was becoming increasingly inegalitarian to the point of becoming like old Europe, and "further and further away from its original pioneering ideal."

According to economist Richard Sutch in an alternative view of the era, the bottom 25% owned 0.32% of the wealth while the top 0.1% owned 9.4%, which would mean the period had the lowest wealth gap in recorded history. He attributes this to the lack of government interference.

There was a significant human cost attached to this period of economic growth, as American industry had the highest rate of accidents in the world. In 1889, railroads employed 704,000 men, of whom 20,000 were injured and 1,972 were killed on the job. The U.S. was also the only industrial power to have no workers' compensation program in place to support injured workers.

=== Impact on human wellbeing ===
Despite the tremendous economic and technological growth, several significant measures of human wellbeing declined during the period and did not recover until the early 20th Century. Average life expectancy at birth, average life expectancy at 10 years old and adult height measures all trended downward during the Gilded Age, even in studies which control for factors such as demographic changes brought on by immigration.

An average white ten-year-old American boy in 1880, born at the beginning of the Gilded Age and living through it, could expect to die at age forty-eight. His height would be 5 feet, 5 inches. He would be shorter and have a briefer life than his Revolutionary forebears.

— Richard White, The Republic for Which it Stands: The United States During Reconstruction and the Gilded Age

Infant mortality was high, and "the average American lifespan at birth was shorter than at twenty because so many children died in early childhood that a person reaching twenty had on average more years to live than an average baby did at birth."

As immigration increased in cities, poverty rose as well. The poorest crowded into low-cost housing such as the Five Points and Hell's Kitchen neighborhoods in New York. Overcrowding spread germs; the death rates in big city tenements vastly exceeded those in the countryside. Rural death rates began to improve after 1870, but urban death rates did not improve until the 1890s, with African Americans and immigrant city dwellers continuing to suffer from high mortality into the 20th century. Different endemic diseases spread in different decades, with Tuberculosis giving way to water-borne and insect transmitted diseases like Malaria and Cholera by the end of the century.

The environmental and human welfare crises brought on by rapid industrialization led to calls for sanitary reforms, though the effects of sanitation improvements would largely not be realized until the Progressive Era. Some sanitary reforms had unintended consequences. For example, the elimination of pigs from cities led to an accumulation of trash in streets on which the animals could no longer scavenge. The installation of sewers to service flush toilets in upper and middle-class homes led to the pollution of waterways and brought an end to urban fisheries, which were a major source of nutrition for the urban poor.

A failure to extend the impact of sanitary reforms to the poor further blunted their success. The construction of tenements to house the growing urban working class "concentrated all the maladies of the poor" and compounded the effects of the urban environmental crisis on human health.

=== Rise of labor unions ===
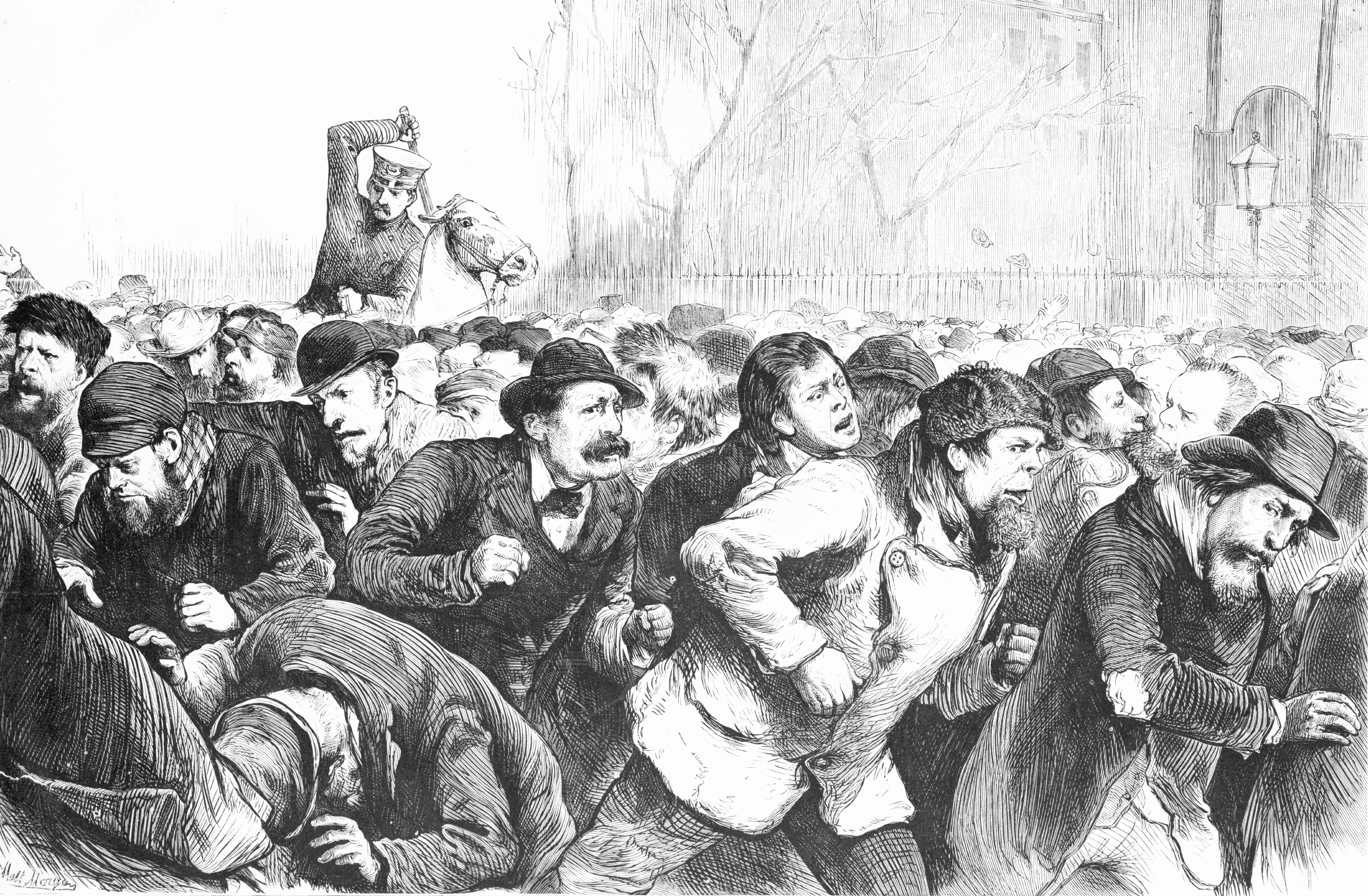
New York police violently attacking unemployed workers in Tompkins Square Park, 1874

Craft-oriented labor unions, such as carpenters, printers, shoemakers and cigar makers, grew steadily in the industrial cities after 1870. These unions used frequent short strikes as a method to attain control over the labor market and fight off competing unions. They generally blocked women, blacks, and Chinese from union membership but welcomed most European immigrants.

The railroads had their own separate unions. An especially large episode of unrest, estimated at 80,000 railroad workers and several hundred thousand other Americans, both employed and unemployed, broke out during the economic depression of the 1870s and became known as the Great Railroad Strike of 1877, which was, according to historian Jack Beatty, "the largest strike anywhere in the world in the 19th century." This strike did not involve labor unions but rather uncoordinated outbursts in numerous cities. The strike and associated riots lasted 45 days and resulted in the deaths of several hundred participants (no police or soldiers were killed), several hundred more injuries, and millions in damages to railroad property. The unrest was deemed severe enough by the government that President Rutherford B. Hayes intervened with federal troops.

Starting in the mid-1880s a new group, the Knights of Labor, grew too rapidly, and it spun out of control and failed to handle the Great Southwest Railroad Strike of 1886. The Knights avoided violence, but their reputation collapsed in the wake of the Haymarket Square Riot in Chicago in 1886, when anarchists allegedly bombed the policemen dispersing a meeting. Police then randomly fired into the crowd, killing and wounding a number of people, including other police, and arbitrarily rounded up anarchists, including leaders of the movement. Seven anarchists went on trial. Four were hanged even though no evidence directly linked them to the bombing. One had in his possession a Knights of Labor membership card. At its peak, the Knights claimed 700,000 members. By 1890, membership had plummeted to fewer than 100,000, then faded away.

Strikes organized by labor unions became routine events by the 1880s as the gap between the rich and the poor widened. There were 37,000 strikes from 1881 to 1905. By far the largest number were in the building trades, followed by coal miners. The main goal was control of working conditions and settling which rival union was in control. Most were of very short duration. In times of depression strikes were more violent but less successful, because the company was losing money anyway. They were successful in times of prosperity when the company was losing profits and wanted to settle quickly. In the 1880s, American workers were striking at three times the rate of workers in France.

The largest and most dramatic strike was the 1894 Pullman Strike, a coordinated effort to shut down the national railroad system. The strike was led by the upstart American Railway Union led by Eugene V. Debs and was not supported by the established brotherhoods. The union defied federal court orders to stop blocking the mail trains, so President Grover Cleveland used the U.S. Army to get the trains moving again. The American Railway Union vanished, and the traditional railroad brotherhoods survived but avoided strikes.

The American Federation of Labor (AFL), headed by Samuel Gompers, found the solution. The AFL was a coalition of unions, each based on strong local chapters; the AFL coordinated their work in cities and prevented jurisdictional battles. Gompers repudiated socialism and abandoned the violent nature of the earlier unions. The AFL worked to control the local labor market, thereby empowering its locals to obtain higher wages and more control over hiring. As a result, the AFL unions spread to most cities, reaching a peak membership in 1919.

This period saw several financial crises and economic recessions—called "panics", notably the Panic of 1873 and the Panic of 1893. They lasted several years, with high urban unemployment, low incomes for farmers, low profits for business, slow overall growth, and reduced immigration. They generated political unrest.

==== Organization of production ====
As America industrialized, the organization of industrial production shifted from smaller firms where more skilled laborers self-organized production to larger factories and warehouses where management sought to determine how work was organized. Control over the organization of production was contested by laborers and labor union, particularly in situations where management sought to impose dangerous or demeaning work routines. The imposition of a management prerogative by the owners of capital led to a tension between "an older republicanism that appealed to independent manhood, citizenship, and the worker as producer" and a "profoundly undemocratic organization of industry."

Informed by producerist values, labor unions fought to preserve workers' self-management. However, these efforts were largely unsuccessful, leading "at best to steady rearguard actions in defense of arcane work rules and at worst defeat." The rise of scientific management, which became more widely implemented in the twentieth century, began to give capitalists more tools and methods with which to organize production to their benefit.

== Politics ==
The Third Party System featured intense competition between two major parties with minor parties coming and going, especially on issues of concern to prohibitionists, to labor unions and to farmers. The Democrats and Republicans fought over control of offices, which were the rewards for party activists, as well as over major economic issues. Voter turnout typically exceeded 80% or even 90% in some Northern states as the parties ran strong campaigns. Turnout in the South was lower. Average presidential turnout 1872 to 1900 was 83% in the North and 62% in the South.

Competition was intense, and elections were very close. In the South, lingering resentment over the Civil War remained and meant that much of the South would vote Democratic. After the end of Reconstruction in 1877, competition in the South took place mainly inside the Democratic Party. Nationwide, turnout fell sharply after 1900.

Despite the high voter turnout, aggressive political campaigning, and frequently nasty elections, there were few real policy differences between the Democrats and Republicans. Gilded age politicians are somewhat infamous among historians for having few actual policies and doing very little of importance in office.

=== Metropolitan area politics ===
The major metropolitan centers underwent rapid population growth and as a result had many lucrative contracts and jobs to award. To take advantage of the new economic opportunity, both parties built so-called "political machines" to manage elections, to reward supporters and to pay off potential opponents. Financed by the "spoils system", the winning party distributed most local, state and national government jobs, and many government contracts, to its loyal supporters.

Large cities became dominated by political machines in which constituents supported a candidate in exchange for anticipated patronage. These votes would be repaid with favors back from the government once the appropriate candidate was elected; and very often candidates were selected based on their willingness to play along with the spoils system. The largest and most notorious political machine was Tammany Hall in New York City, led by Democrat Boss Tweed.

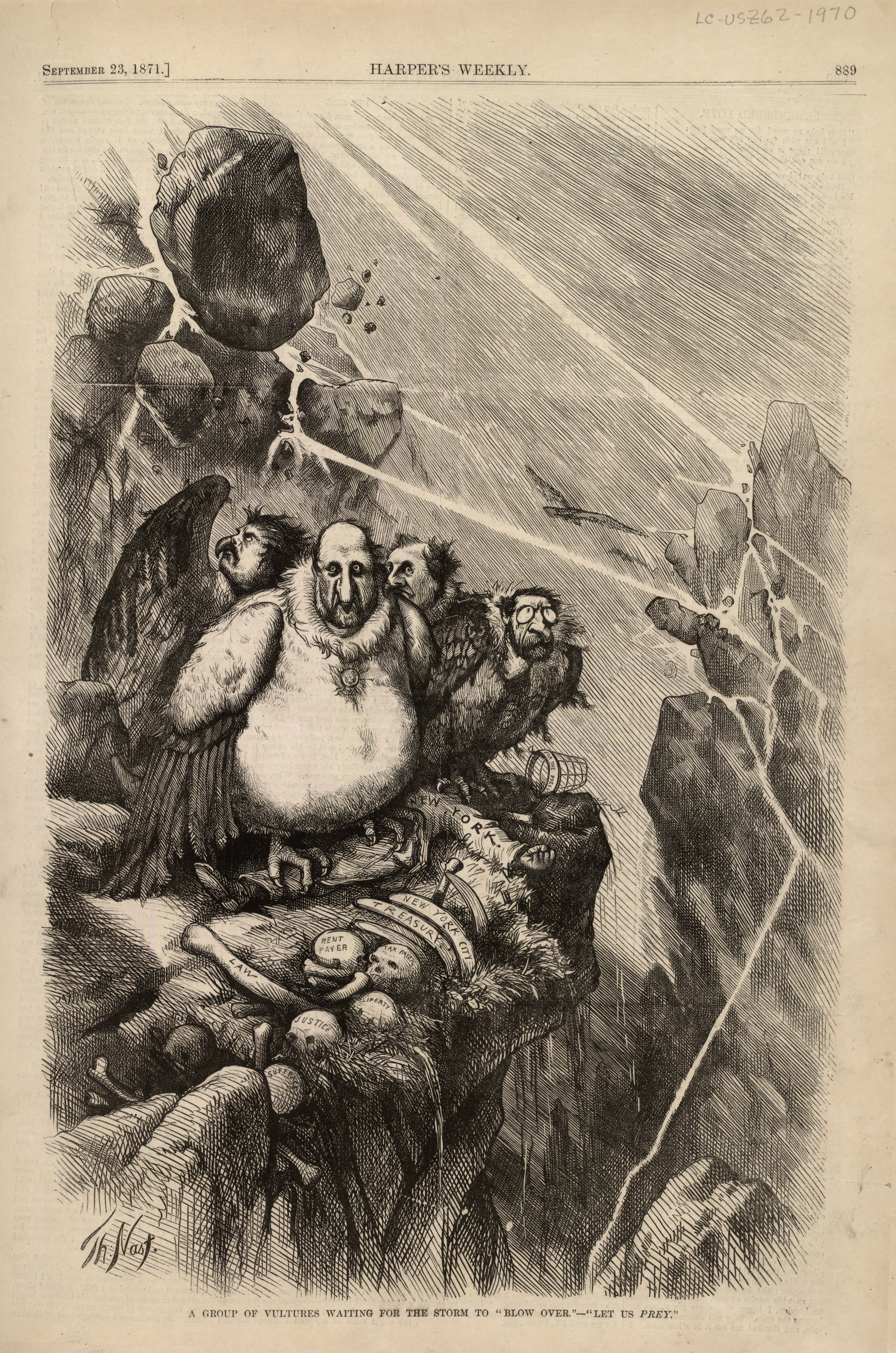
A Group of Vultures Waiting for the Storm to "Blow Over" – "Let Us Prey," a cartoon denouncing the corruption of New York's Boss Tweed and other Tammany Hall figures, drawn in 1871 by Thomas Nast and published in Harper's Weekly

=== Scandals and corruption ===
Political corruption was rampant, as business leaders spent significant amounts of money ensuring that government did not regulate the activities of big business—and they more often than not got what they wanted. Such corruption was so commonplace that in 1868 the New York state legislature legalized such bribery. Historian Howard Zinn argues that the U.S. government was acting exactly as Karl Marx describes capitalist states: "pretending neutrality to maintain order, but serving the interests of the rich". Historian Mark Wahlgren Summers calls it, "The Era of Good Stealings", a play on the Era of Good Feelings, noting how machine politicians used "padded expenses, lucrative contracts, outright embezzlements, and illegal bond issues." He concludes:

Corruption gave the age a distinctive flavor. It marred the planning and development of the cities, infected lobbyists dealings, and disgraced even the cleanest of the Reconstructed states. For many reasons, however, its effect on policy was less overwhelming than once imagined. Corruption influenced a few substantive decisions; it rarely determined one.

Numerous swindlers were active, especially before the Panic of 1873 exposed the falsifications and caused a wave of bankruptcies. Former President Ulysses S. Grant was the most famous victim of scoundrels and con-men, of whom he most trusted Ferdinand Ward. Grant was cheated out of all his money, although some genuine friends bought Grant's personal assets and allowed him to keep their use.

Interpreting the phenomena, historian Allan Nevins deplores "The Moral Collapse in Government and Business: 1865–1873." He argues that at war's end society showed confusion and unsettlement as well as a hurried aggressive growth on the other. They:

united to give birth to an alarming public and private corruption. Obviously much of the shocking improbity was due to the heavy war-time expenditures.... Speculators and jobbers waxed fat on government money, the collection of federal revenues offered large opportunities for graft.... Under the stimulus of greenback inflation, business ran into excesses and lost sight of elementary canons of prudence. Meanwhile, it became clear that thievery had found a better opportunity to grow because the conscience of the nation aroused against slavery, had neglected what seemed minor evils..... The thousands who had rushed into speculations which they had no moral right to risk, the pushing, hardened men brought to the front by the turmoil, observed a coarser, lower standard of conduct.... Much of the trouble lay in the immense growth of national wealth unaccompanied by any corresponding growth in civic responsibility.

=== National politics ===
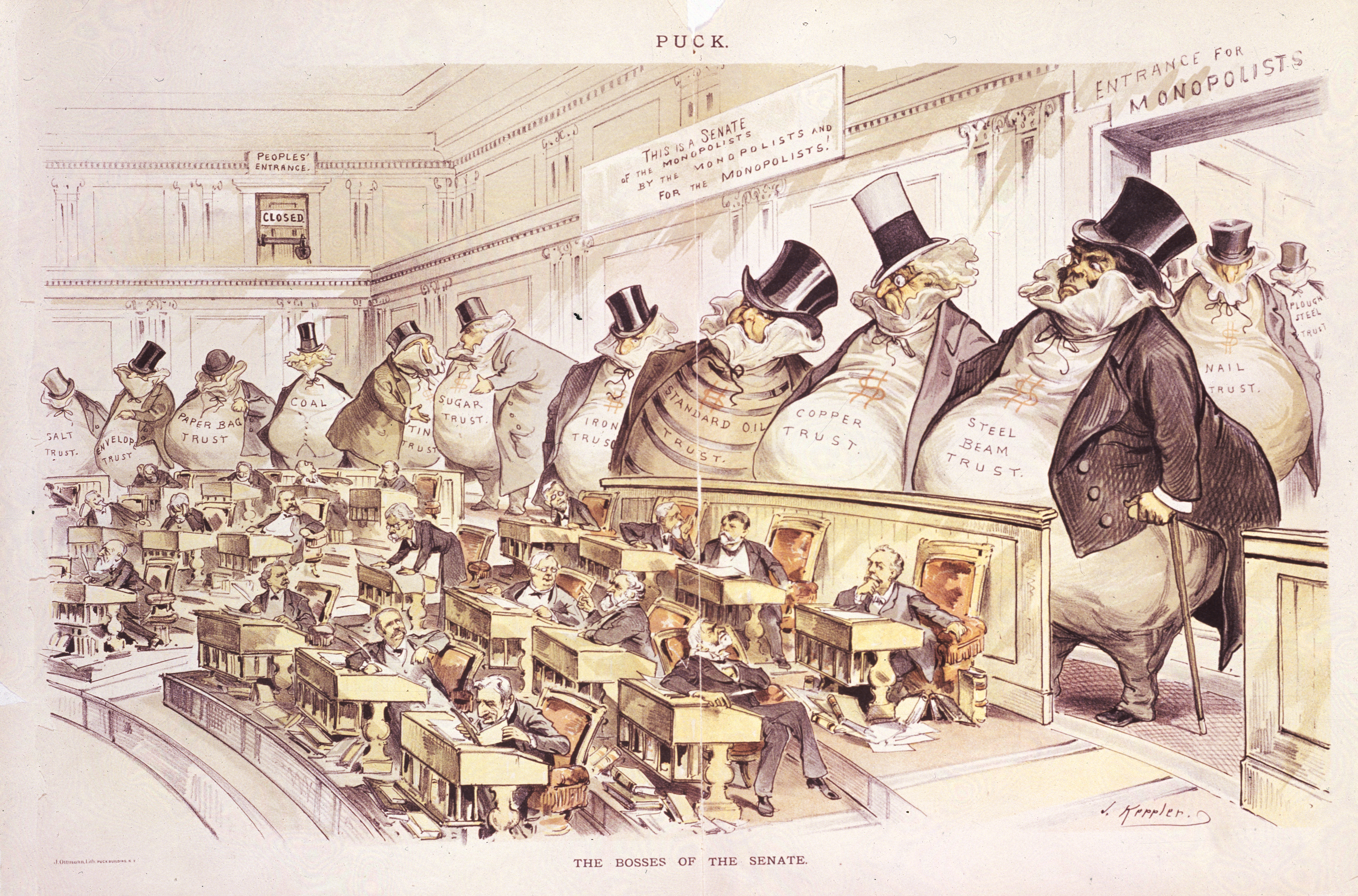
The Bosses of the Senate (1889). Reformers like the cartoonist Joseph Keppler depicted the Senate as controlled by the giant moneybags, who represented the nation's financial trusts and monopolies.

Major scandals reached into Congress with the Crédit Mobilier scandal of 1872 and disgraced the White House during the Grant administration. This corruption divided the Republican Party into two factions: the Stalwarts led by Roscoe Conkling and the Half-Breeds led by James G. Blaine. There was a sense that government-enabled political machines intervened in the economy and that the resulting favoritism, bribery, inefficiency, waste, and corruption were having negative consequences. Accordingly, there were widespread calls for reform, such as Civil Service Reform led by the Bourbon Democrats and Republican Mugwumps. In 1884, their support elected Democrat Cleveland to the White House and in doing so gave the Democrats their first national victory since 1856.

The Bourbon Democrats supported a free market policy, with low tariffs, low taxes, less spending and, in general, a laissez-faire (hands-off) government. They argued that tariffs made most goods more expensive for the consumer and subsidized "the trusts" (monopolies). They also denounced imperialism and overseas expansion. By contrast, Republicans insisted that national prosperity depended on industry that paid high wages and warned that lowering tariffs would bring disaster because goods from low-wage European factories would flood American markets.

Presidential elections between the two major parties were so closely contested that a slight nudge could tip the election in the advantage of either party, and Congress was marked by political stalemate. With support from Union veterans, businessmen, professionals, craftsmen, and larger farmers, the Republicans consistently carried the North in presidential elections. The Democrats, often led by Irish Catholics, had a base among Catholics, poorer farmers, and traditional party members.

The nation elected a string of relatively weak presidents collectively referred to as the "forgettable presidents" (Johnson, Grant, Hayes, Garfield, Arthur, and Harrison, with the exception of Cleveland) who served in the White House during this period. "What little political vitality existed in Gilded Age America was to be found in local settings or in Congress, which overshadowed the White House for most of this period."

Overall, Republican and Democratic political platforms remained remarkably constant during the years before 1900. Both favored business interests. Republicans called for high tariffs, while Democrats wanted hard money and free trade. Regulation was rarely an issue.

=== Ethnocultural politics: pietistic Republicans versus liturgical Democrats ===
Voting behavior by religion, Northern US, late 19th century
	% Dem	% GOP
Immigrant Groups		
Irish Catholics	80	20
All Catholics	70	30
Confessional German Lutherans	65	35
German Reformed	60	40
French Canadian Catholics	50	50
Less Confessional German Lutherans	45	55
English Canadians	40	60
British Stock	35	65
German Sectarians	30	70
Norwegian Lutherans	20	80
Swedish Lutherans	15	85
Haugean Norwegians	5	95
Anglo-Saxon Pilgrims: Northern Stock		
Quakers	5	95
Free Will Baptists	20	80
Congregational	25	75
Methodists	25	75
Regular Baptists	35	65
Blacks	40	60
Presbyterians	40	60
Episcopalians	45	55
Anglo-Saxon Pilgrims: Southern Stock (living in North)		
Disciples	50	50
Presbyterians	70	30
Baptists	75	25
Methodists	90	10

From 1860 to the early 20th century, the Republicans took advantage of the association of the Democrats with "Rum, Romanism, and Rebellion". "Rum" stood for the liquor interests and the tavern keepers, in contrast to the GOP, which had a strong dry element. "Romanism" meant Roman Catholics, especially Irish Americans, who ran the Democratic Party in most cities and who the reformers denounced for political corruption and their separate parochial school system. "Rebellion" harked back to the Democrats of the Confederacy, who had tried to break the Union in 1861, as well as to their northern allies, called "Copperheads".

Demographic trends boosted the Democratic totals, as the German and Irish Catholic immigrants became Democrats and outnumbered the English and Scandinavian Republicans. Immigrants who arrived after 1890 seldom voted at this time. During the 1880s and 1890s, the Republicans struggled against the Democrats' efforts, winning several close elections and losing two to Cleveland (in 1884 and 1892).

Religious lines were sharply drawn. In the North, about 50% of the voters were pietistic Protestants, especially Methodists, Scandinavian Lutherans, Presbyterians, Congregationalists, and Disciples of Christ, who believed in using the government to reduce social sins, such as drinking. They strongly supported the GOP, as the table shows.

In sharp contrast, liturgical groups, especially the Catholics, Episcopalians, and German Lutherans, voted for the Democrats. They saw the Democratic Party as their best protection from the moralism of the pietists, and especially from the threat of prohibition. Both parties cut across the class structure, with the Democrats more bottom-heavy and the GOP better represented among businessmen and professionals in the North.

Many cultural issues, especially prohibition and foreign-language schools, became hard-fought political issues because of the deep religious divisions in the electorate. For example, in Wisconsin the Republicans tried to close down German language Catholic and Lutheran parochial schools and were defeated in 1890 when the Bennett Law was put to the test.

Prohibition debates and referendums heated up politics in most states over a period of decades, as national prohibition was finally passed in 1919 (and repealed in 1933), serving as a major issue between the wet Democrats and the dry GOP.

=== Judges and the administrative state ===
Judges, influenced by classical liberalism, interpreted the 14th Amendment in a manner that enabled them to strike down a broad range of state regulations. Supreme Court Justice Stephen J. Field's dissenting opinion in the Slaughter-House Cases, which "upheld the power of the federal government under the 14th Amendment to enforce a uniform set of rights for all citizens" became predominant in judicial thinking in the later decades of the Gilded Age. Judges used this justification to invalidate more than 60 labor laws between 1880 and 1900. Judges issued injunctions and rulings against public health regulations, strikes, boycotts and licensing laws, stymieing efforts at state and regional reform and limiting popular sovereignty.

By the 1890s liberal judges' expansive approach to the law had achieved breathtaking reach. By embracing classical economic theory, they applied the doctrine of substantive due process to enshrine a set of economic laws that no democratic government could overturn; they transformed metaphorical natural law into a body of actual law created by the judiciary. They treated freedom of contract, open competition, and laissez-faire as part of the Constitution. Judges justified their legal opinions by citing the laws of nature and the "laws" of the market, although neither was to be found on the statute books or in common law.

== Immigration ==
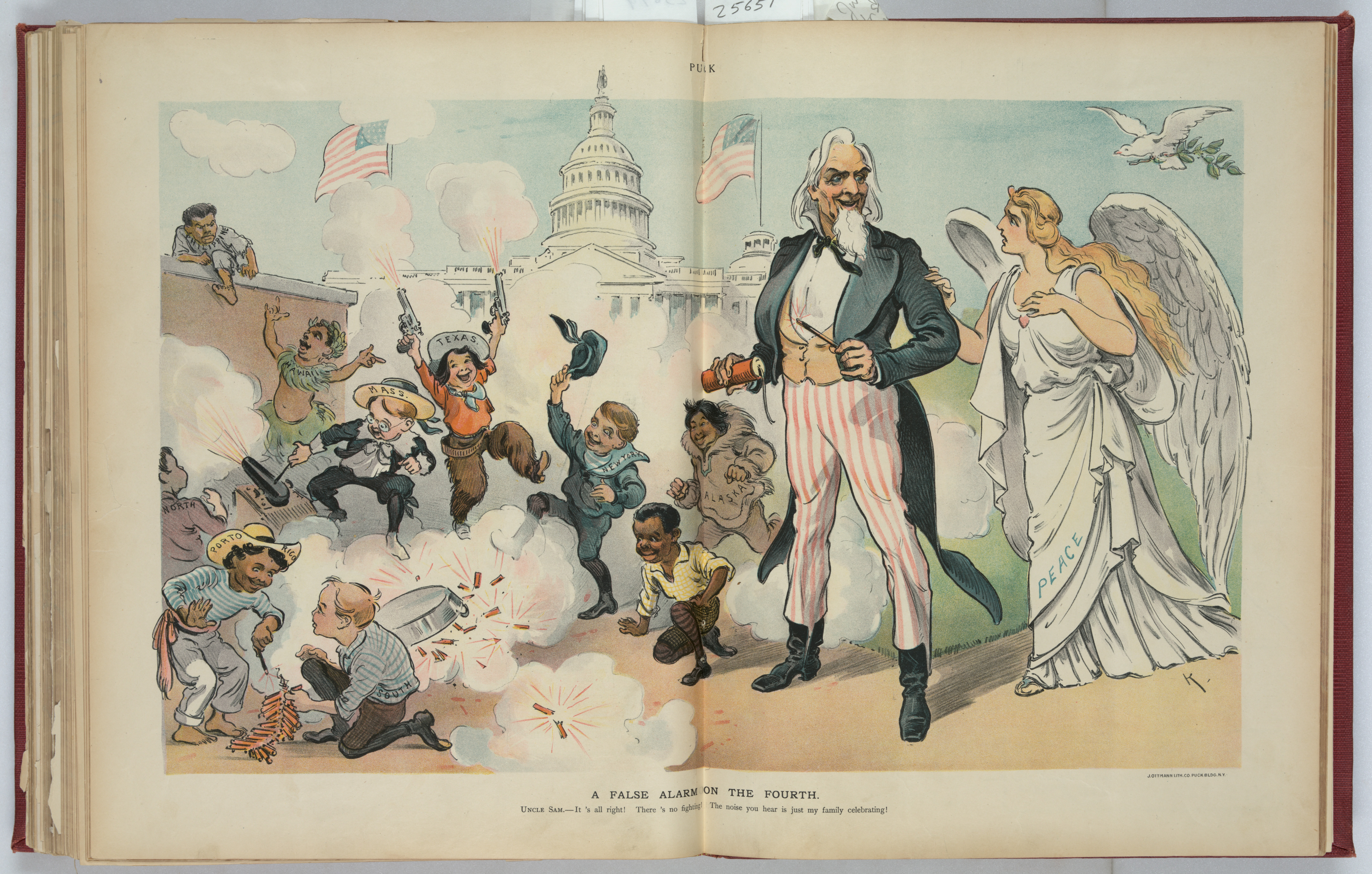
Celebrating ethnic pluralism on 4th of July. 1902 Puck editorial cartoon

Prior to the Gilded Age, the time commonly referred to as the old immigration saw the first real boom of new arrivals to the United States. During the Gilded Age, approximately 20 million immigrants came to the United States in what is known as the new immigration. Some of them were prosperous farmers who had the cash to buy land and tools in the Plains states especially. Many were poor peasants looking for the American Dream in unskilled manual labor in mills, mines, and factories. Few immigrants went to the poverty-stricken South, though. To accommodate the heavy influx, the federal government in 1892 opened a reception center at Ellis Island near the Statue of Liberty; new arrivals needed to pass a medical inspection.

=== Waves of old and new immigrants ===
These European immigrants consisted of two groups: The last big waves of the old immigration from Germany, Britain, Ireland, and Scandinavia, and the rising waves of the new immigration, which peaked about 1910. Some men moved back and forth across the Atlantic Ocean, but most were permanent settlers. They moved into well-established communities, both urban and rural. The German American communities spoke German, but their younger generation was bilingual. The Scandinavian groups generally assimilated quickly; they were noted for their support of reform programs, such as prohibition.

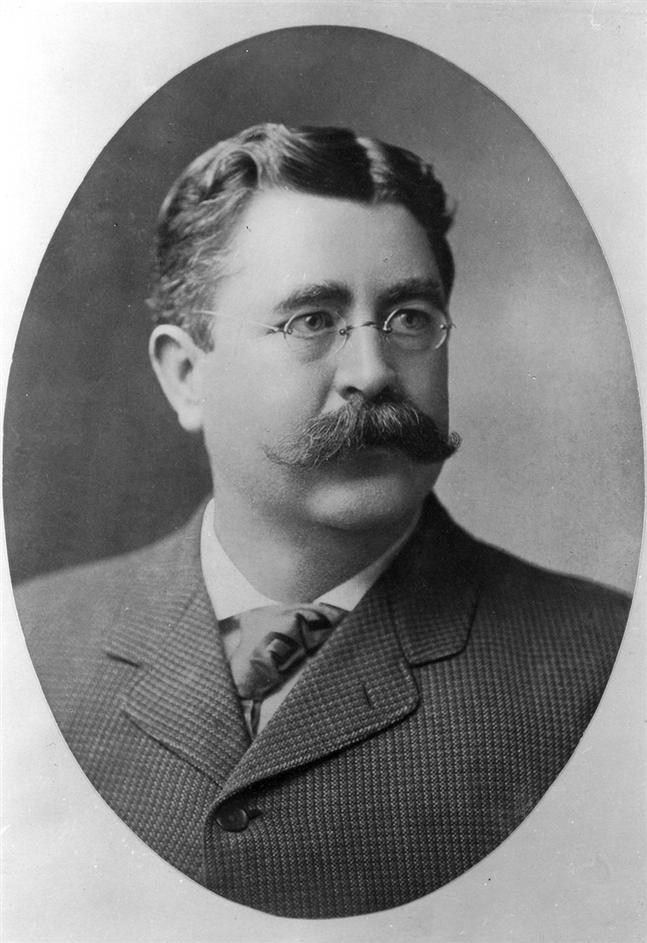
Businessman and politician P. J. Kennedy of Boston in 1900; his grandson John F. Kennedy became president in 1960

After 1880, the old immigration slackened off. The United States was producing large numbers of new unskilled jobs every year, and to fill them came immigrants from Italy, Poland, Austria, Hungary, Russia, Greece, and other points in southern and central Europe, as well as French Canada. The old immigrants by the 1870s had formed highly stable communities, especially the German Americans. The British immigrants tended to blend into the general population.

Irish Catholics had arrived in large numbers in the 1840s and 1850s in the wake of the great famine in Ireland where starvation killed millions. Their first few decades were characterized by extreme poverty, social dislocation, crime, and violence in their slums. By the late 19th century, the Irish communities had largely stabilized, with a strong "lace curtain" middle class of local businessmen, professionals, and political leaders typified by P. J. Kennedy in Boston.

In economic terms, Irish Catholics were nearly at the bottom in the 1850s. They reached the national average by 1900, and by the late 20th century they far surpassed the national average. In political terms, the Irish Catholics comprised a major element in the leadership of the urban Democratic machines across the country. Although they were only a third of the total Catholic population, the Irish also dominated the Catholic Church, producing most of the bishops, college presidents, and leaders of charitable organizations. The network of Catholic institutions provided high status but low-paying lifetime careers to sisters and nuns in parochial schools, hospitals, orphanages and convents. They were part of an international Catholic network, with considerable movement back and forth from Ireland, England, France, Germany, and Canada.

==== New immigrants ====
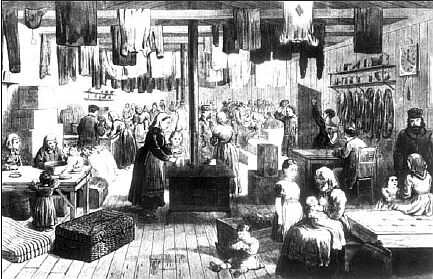
Temporary quarters for Volga Germans in central Kansas, 1875

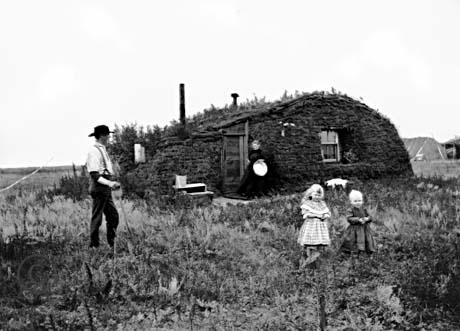
Norwegian settlers in front of their sod house in North Dakota, 1898

The new immigrants were much poorer peasants and rural folk from southern and eastern Europe, including mostly Italians, Poles, and Jews. Some men, especially the Italians and Greeks, saw themselves as temporary migrants who planned to return to their home villages with a nest egg of cash earned in long hours of unskilled labor. Others, especially the Jews, had been driven out of Eastern Europe and had no intention of returning.

Historians analyze the causes of immigration in terms of push factors (pushing people out of the homeland) and pull factors (pulling them to America). The push factors included economic dislocation, shortages of land, and antisemitism. Pull factors were the economic opportunity of good inexpensive farmland or jobs in factories, mills and mines.

The first generation typically lived in ethnic enclaves with a common language, food, religion, and connections through the old village. The sheer numbers caused overcrowding in tenements in the larger cities. In the small mill towns, however, management usually built company housing with cheap rents.

=== Chinese immigrants ===
Chinese immigrants were hired by California construction companies for temporary railroad work. European Americans strongly disliked the Chinese for their alien lifestyles and the threat of low wages. The construction of the Central Pacific Railroad from California to Utah was handled largely by Chinese laborers. In the 1870 census, there were 63,000 Chinese men with a few women in the entire U.S.; this number grew to 106,000 in 1880. Labor unions led by Samuel Gompers strongly opposed the presence of Chinese labor. Immigrants from China were not allowed to become citizens until 1950; however, as a result of the Supreme Court decision in United States v. Wong Kim Ark, their children born in the U.S. were full citizens.

Congress further banned Chinese immigration through the Chinese Exclusion Act in 1882; the act prohibited Chinese laborers from entering the United States, but some students and businessmen were allowed in on a temporary basis. The Chinese population declined to only 37,000 in 1940. Although many returned to China (a greater proportion than most other immigrant groups), most of them stayed in the United States. Chinese people were unwelcome in urban neighborhoods, so they resettled in the "Chinatown" districts of large cities. The exclusion policy lasted until the 1940s.

== Rural life ==
A dramatic expansion in farming took place, with the number of farms tripling from 2.0 million in 1860 to 6.0 million in 1905. The number of people living on farms grew from about 10 million in 1860 to 22 million in 1880 to 31 million in 1905. The value of farms soared from $8.0 billion in 1860 to $30 billion in 1906.

The federal government issued 160-acre (65 ha) tracts virtually free to settlers under the Homestead Act of 1862. Even larger numbers purchased lands at very low interest from the new railroads, which were trying to create markets. The railroads advertised heavily in Europe and brought over, at low fares, hundreds of thousands of farmers from Germany, Scandinavia and Britain. Despite their remarkable progress and general prosperity, 19th century U.S. farmers experienced recurring cycles of hardship, caused primarily by falling world prices for cotton and wheat.

Along with the mechanical improvements which greatly increased yield per unit area, the amount of land under cultivation grew rapidly throughout the second half of the century, as the railroads opened up areas of the West for settlement. The wheat farmers enjoyed abundant output and good years from 1876 to 1881 when bad European harvests kept the world price high. They then suffered from a slump in the 1880s when conditions in Europe improved. The farther west the settlers went, the more dependent they became on the monopolistic railroads to move their goods to market, and the more inclined they were to protest, as in the Populist movement of the 1890s. Wheat farmers blamed local grain elevator owners (who purchased their crop), railroads and eastern bankers for the low prices. This protest has now been attributed to the far increased uncertainty in farming due to its commercialisation, with monopolies, the gold standard and loans being simply visualisations of this risk.

The first organized effort to address general agricultural problems was the Grange movement. Launched in 1867 by employees of the U.S. Department of Agriculture, the Granges focused initially on social activities to counter the isolation most farm families experienced. Women's participation was actively encouraged. Spurred by the Panic of 1873, the Grange grew to 20,000 chapters and 1.5 million members. The Granges set up their own marketing systems, stores, processing plants, factories and cooperatives; most went bankrupt. The movement enjoyed some political success during the 1870s. A few Midwestern states passed "Granger Laws" limiting railroad and warehouse fees. The agricultural problems gained mass political attention in the Populist movement, which won 44 votes in the Electoral College in the 1892 election. Its high point came in 1896 with the candidacy of William Jennings Bryan for the Democrats, who was sympathetic to populist concerns such as the silver standard.

== Urban life ==
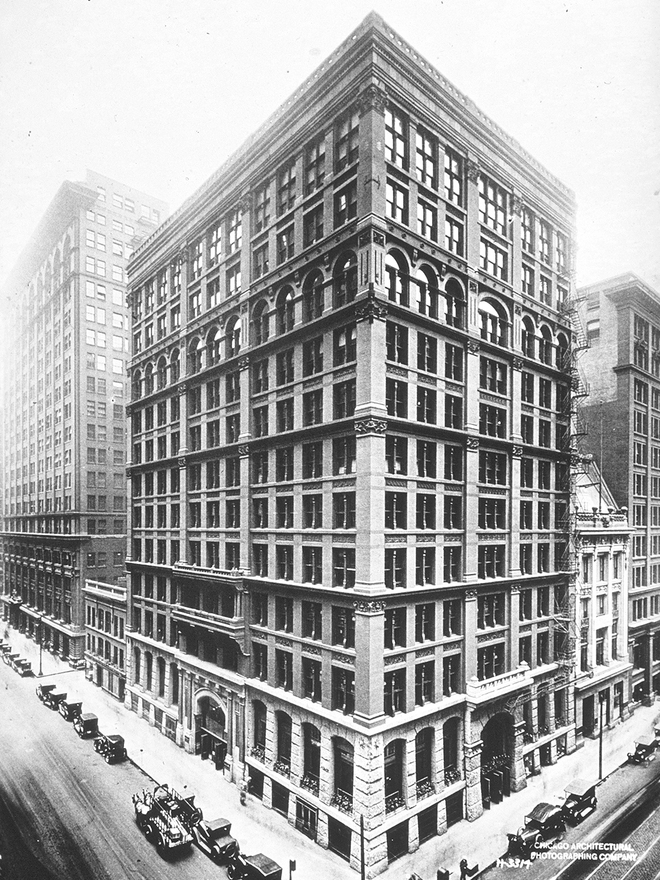
The Home Insurance Building in Chicago, Illinois became the world's first skyscraper when it was built in 1885.

American society experienced significant changes in the period following the Civil War, most notably the rapid urbanization of the North. Due to the increasing demand for unskilled workers, most European immigrants went to mill towns, mining camps, and industrial cities. New York, Philadelphia, and especially Chicago saw rapid growth. Louis Sullivan became a noted architect using steel frames to construct skyscrapers for the first time while pioneering the idea of "form follows function". Chicago became the center of the skyscraper craze, starting with the ten-story Home Insurance Building in 1884–1885 by William Le Baron Jenney.

Rapid outward expansion required longer journeys to work and shopping for the middle class office workers and housewives. The working class generally did not own automobiles until after 1945; they typically walked to nearby factories and patronized small neighborhood stores. The middle class demanded a better transportation system. Slow horse-drawn streetcars and faster electric trolleys were the rage in the 1880s.

In the horse-drawn era, streets were unpaved and covered with dirt or gravel. However, this produced uneven wear, created hazards for pedestrians, and made for dangerous potholes for bicycles and for motor vehicles. Manhattan alone had 130,000 horses in 1900, pulling streetcars, delivery wagons, and private carriages, and leaving their waste behind. They were not fast, and pedestrians could dodge and scramble their way across the crowded streets.

In small towns people mostly walked to their destination so they continued to rely on dirt and gravel into the 1920s. Larger cities had much more complex transportation needs. They wanted better streets, so they paved them with wood or granite blocks. In 1890, a third of Chicago's 2,000 miles of streets were paved, chiefly with wooden blocks, which gave better traction than mud. Brick surfacing was a good compromise, but even better was asphalt paving. With London and Paris as models, Washington laid 400,000 square yards of asphalt paving by 1882 and served as a model for Buffalo, Philadelphia, and elsewhere.

By the end of the century, American cities boasted 30 million square yards of asphalt paving, followed by brick construction. Street-level electric trolleys moved at 12 miles per hour and became the main transportation service for middle class shoppers and office workers. Big-city streets became paths for faster and larger and more dangerous vehicles. In the largest cities, street railways were elevated, which increased their speed and lessened their dangers. Boston built the first subway in the 1890s followed by New York a decade later.

== Southern and Western United States ==
=== South ===
The Southern United States in red

The Southern United States remained heavily rural and was much poorer than the North or West. Reconstruction brought major changes in agricultural practices. The most significant of these was sharecropping, where tenant farmers "shared" up to half of their crop with the landowners, in exchange for seed and essential supplies. About 80% of the Black farmers and 40% of White farmers lived under this system after the Civil War. Most sharecroppers were locked in a cycle of debt, from which the only hope of escape was increased planting. This led to the over-production of cotton and tobacco (and thus to declining prices and income), soil exhaustion, and poverty among both landowners and tenants.

Agriculture's share of the labor force, 1890

Northeast	15%
Middle Atlantic	17%
Midwest	43%
South Atlantic	63%
South Central	67%
West	29%

There were only a few scattered cities; small courthouse towns serviced the farm population. Local politics revolved around the politicians and lawyers based at the courthouse. Mill towns, narrowly focused on textile production or cigarette manufacture, began opening in the Piedmont region especially in the Carolinas. Racial segregation and outward signs of inequality were everywhere, and rarely were challenged. Black people who violated the color line were liable to expulsion or lynching. Cotton became even more important than before, as poor White people needed the cash that cotton would bring. Cotton prices were much lower than before the war, so most southerners were poor. White southerners showed a reluctance to move north, or to move to cities, so the number of small farms proliferated, and they became smaller as the population grew.

Many of the White farmers and most of the Black farmers were tenant farmers who owned their work animals and tools and rented the land. Others were day laborers or very poor sharecroppers, who worked under the supervision of the landowner. There was little cash in circulation because most farmers operated on credit accounts from local merchants and paid off their debts at cotton harvest time in the fall. Although there were small country churches everywhere, there were only a few dilapidated elementary schools. Apart from private academies, there were very few high schools until the 1920s. Conditions were marginally better in newer areas, especially in Texas and central Florida, with the deepest poverty in South Carolina, Mississippi, and Arkansas.

The vast majority of African Americans lived in the South, and as the promises of emancipation and reconstruction faded, they entered the nadir of race relations. Every Southern state and city passed Jim Crow laws that were in effect from the late 19th century to 1964, when they were abolished by Congress. They mandated de jure (legal) segregation in all public facilities, such as stores and street cars, with a supposedly "separate but equal" status for Black people. In reality, this led to treatment and accommodations that were dramatically inferior to those provided for White Americans, systematizing a number of economic, educational and social disadvantages. Schools for Black people were far fewer and poorly supported by taxpayers, although Northern philanthropies and churches kept open dozens of academies and small colleges.

In the face of years of mounting violence and intimidation directed at Black people during Reconstruction, the federal government was unable to guarantee constitutional protections to freedmen. In the Compromise of 1877 President Hayes withdrew Union troops from the South; "Redeemers" (White Democrats) acted quickly to reverse the groundbreaking advances of Reconstruction. Black political power was eliminated in the 1880s, and in the 1890s new laws effectively blocked over 90% of the Black people from voting (with some exceptions in Tennessee; Black people did vote in the border states).

=== West ===
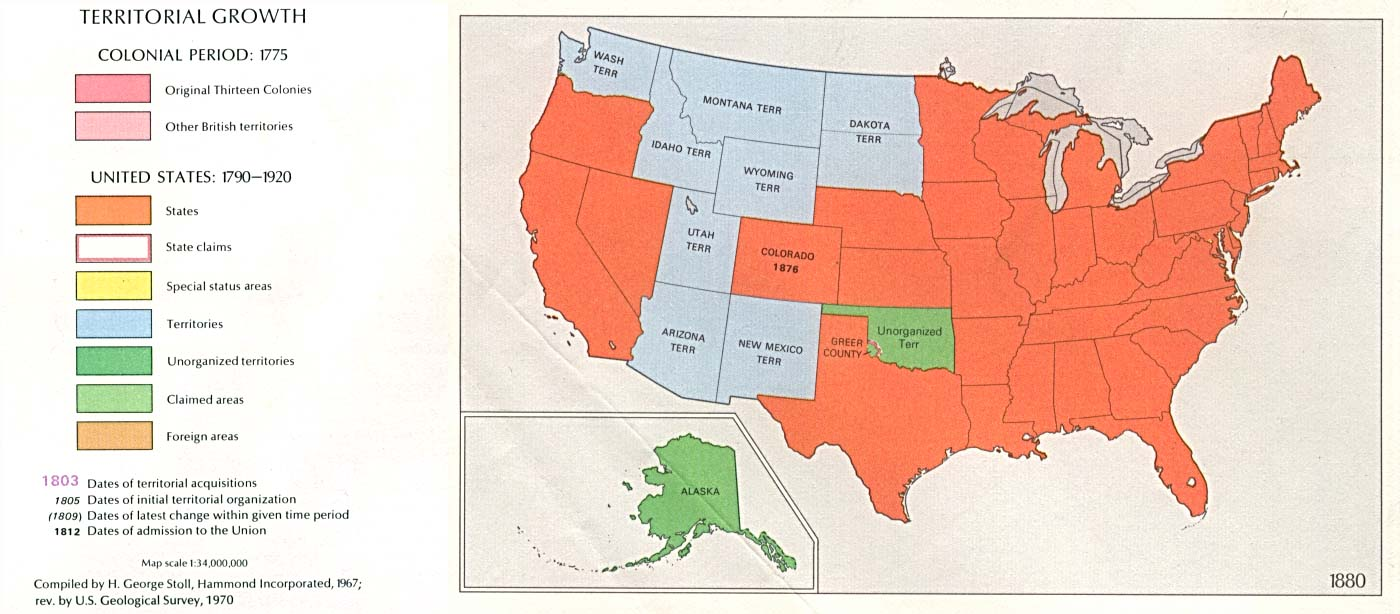
A map of the United States, 1870–1880. Orange indicates states, light blue indicates US territories, and green shows unorganized territories.

In 1869, the first transcontinental railroad—a combination of the Union Pacific from Omaha to Utah and the Central Pacific from Utah to California—opened up the far west mining and ranching regions. As a result travel from New York to San Francisco took six days instead of six months.

After the Civil War, many from the East Coast and Europe were lured west by reports from relatives and by extensive advertising campaigns promising "the Best Prairie Lands", "Low Prices", "Large Discounts For Cash", and "Better Terms Than Ever!". The new railroads provided the opportunity for migrants to go out and take a look, with special family tickets, the cost of which could be applied to land purchases offered by the railroads.

Farming the plains was indeed more difficult than back east. Water management was more critical, lightning fires were more prevalent, the weather was more extreme, rainfall was less predictable. The fearful stayed home, while migrants were mainly motivated by a search to improve their economic life. Farmers sought larger, cheaper and more fertile land; merchants and tradesman sought new customers and new leadership opportunities. Laborers wanted higher paying work and better conditions. With the Homestead Act providing free land to citizens and the railroads selling cheap lands to European farmers, the settlement of the Great Plains was swiftly accomplished, and the frontier had virtually ended by 1890.

==== Family life ====
Few single men attempted to operate a farm. Farmers clearly understood the need for a hard-working wife and numerous children to handle the many chores, including child-rearing, feeding and clothing the family, managing the housework, and feeding the hired hands. During the early years of settlement, farm women played an integral role in assuring family survival by working outdoors. After a generation or so, women increasingly left the fields, thus redefining their roles within the family. New conveniences such as sewing and washing machines encouraged women to turn to domestic roles. The scientific housekeeping movement was promoted across the land by the media and government extension agents, as well as county fairs which featured achievements in home cookery and canning, advice columns for women in the farm papers, and home economics courses in schools.

Although the eastern image of farm life on the prairies emphasizes the isolation of the lonely farmer and the bleakness of farm life, in reality rural folk created a rich social life for themselves. For example, many joined a local branch of the Grange; a majority had ties to local churches. It was popular to organize activities that combined practical work, abundant food, and simple entertainment such as barn raisings, corn huskings, and quilting bees. One could keep busy with scheduled Grange meetings, church services, and school functions. Women organized shared meals and potluck events, as well as extended visits between families.

Childhood on western farms is contested territory. One group of scholars argues the rural environment was salubrious because it allowed children to break loose from urban hierarchies of age and gender, promoted family interdependence, and produced children who were more self-reliant, mobile, adaptable, responsible, independent and more in touch with nature than their urban or eastern counterparts. However other historians offer a grim portrait of loneliness, privation, abuse, and demanding physical labor from an early age.

==== Native assimilation ====
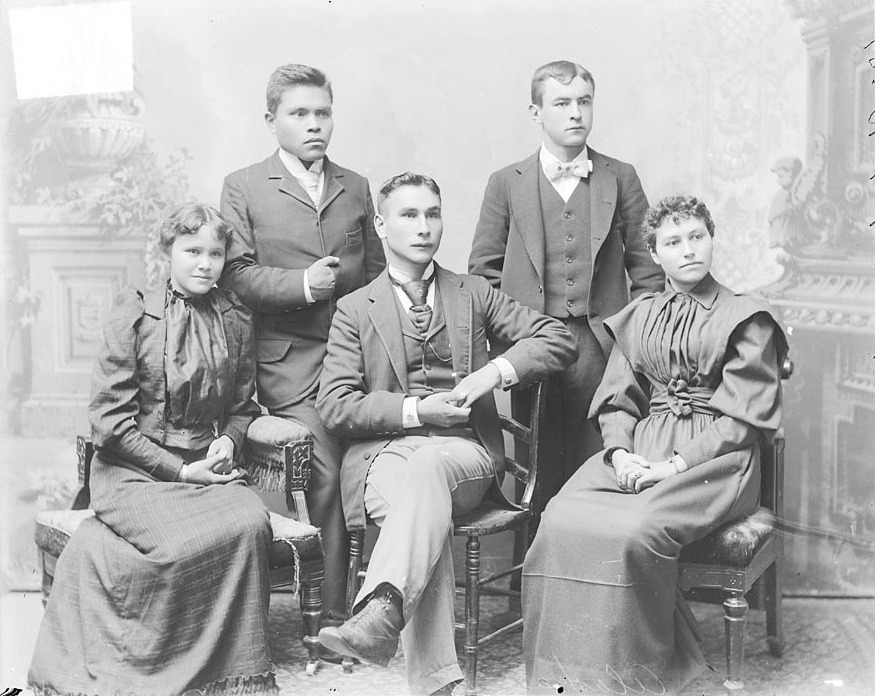
A group of students, together with a non-Native man, 1893

Native American policy was set by the national government (the states had very little role), and after 1865 the national policy was that Native Americans either had to assimilate into the larger community or remain on reservations, where the government provided subsidies. Reservation natives were no longer allowed to roam or fight their traditional enemies. The U.S. Army was to enforce the laws. Natives of the West came in conflict with expansion by miners, ranchers and settlers. Settlers killed American bison by the millions. These animals were the foundation of the economy of the indigenous peoples of the Great Plains, so their near-extinction in the 1880s had a severe impact. Violence petered out in the 1880s and practically ceased after 1890.

Native Americans individually had the choice of living on reservations, with food, supplies, education and medical care provided by the federal government, or living on their own in the larger society and earning wages, typically as a cowboy on a ranch, or manual worker in town. Reformers wanted to give as many Native Americans as possible the opportunity to own and operate their own farms and ranches, so the issue was how to give individual natives land owned by the tribe. To assimilate the natives into American society, reformers set up training programs and schools, such as the Carlisle Indian Industrial School in Carlisle, Pennsylvania, that produced many prominent Native American leaders. However, anti-assimilation traditionalists on the reservations resisted integration and the resulting loss of their traditional life.

In 1887, the Dawes Act proposed to divide tribal land and parcel out 160 acres (0.65 km^{2}) of land to each head of family. Such allotments were to be held in trust by the government for 25 years, then given to owners with full title, so they could sell it or mortgage it. As individual natives sold their land, the total held by the native community shrank by almost half. The individualized system undermined the traditional communal tribal organization. Furthermore, a majority of natives responded to intense missionary activity by converting to Christianity. The long-term goal of Dawes Act was to integrate natives into the mainstream. Those who refused to assimilate remained in poverty on reservations, supported until now by Federal food, medicine and schooling. In 1934, national policy was reversed again by the Indian Reorganization Act which tried to protect tribal and communal life on reservations.

== Art ==
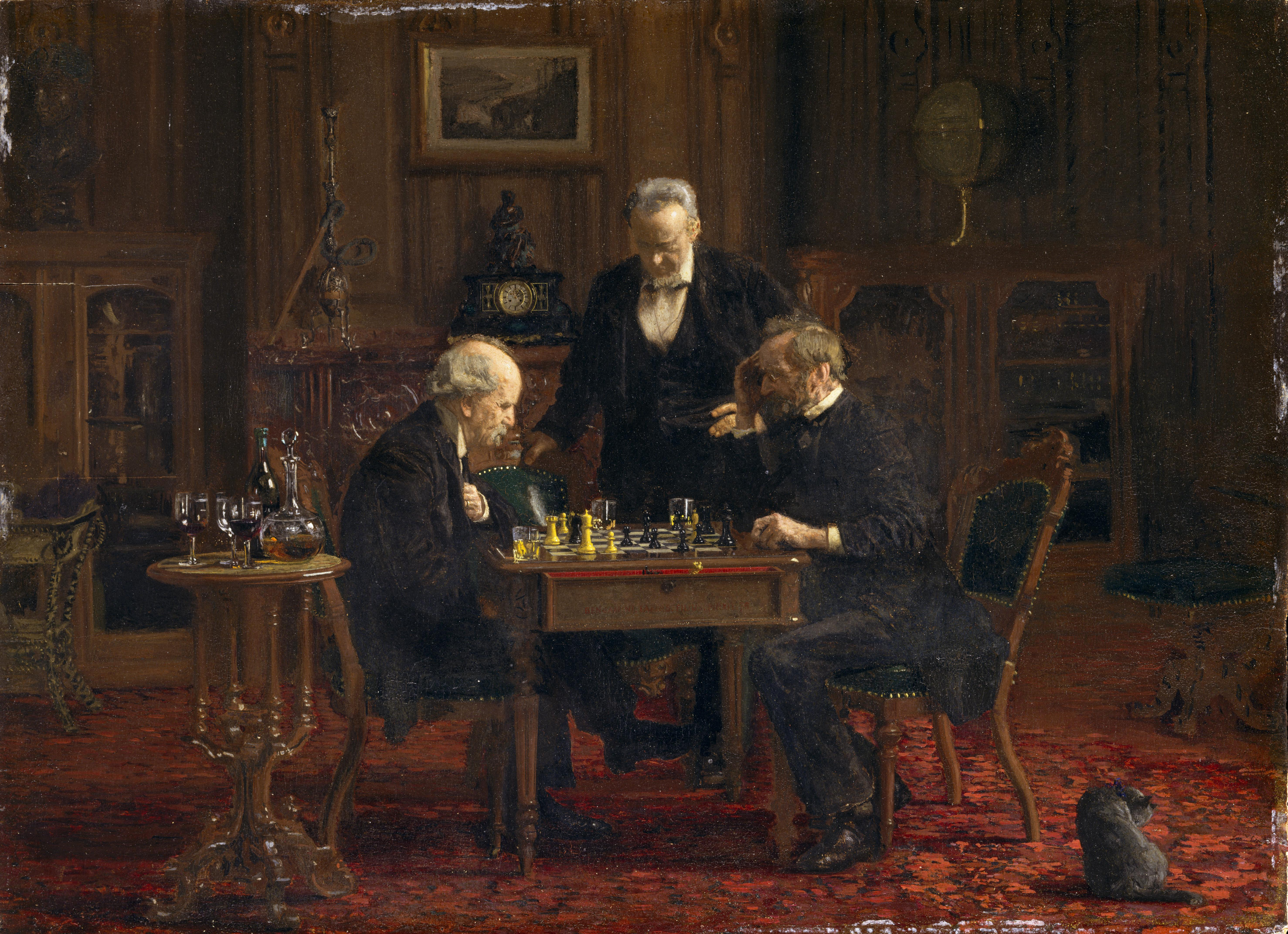
The Chess Players, Thomas Eakins (1876)

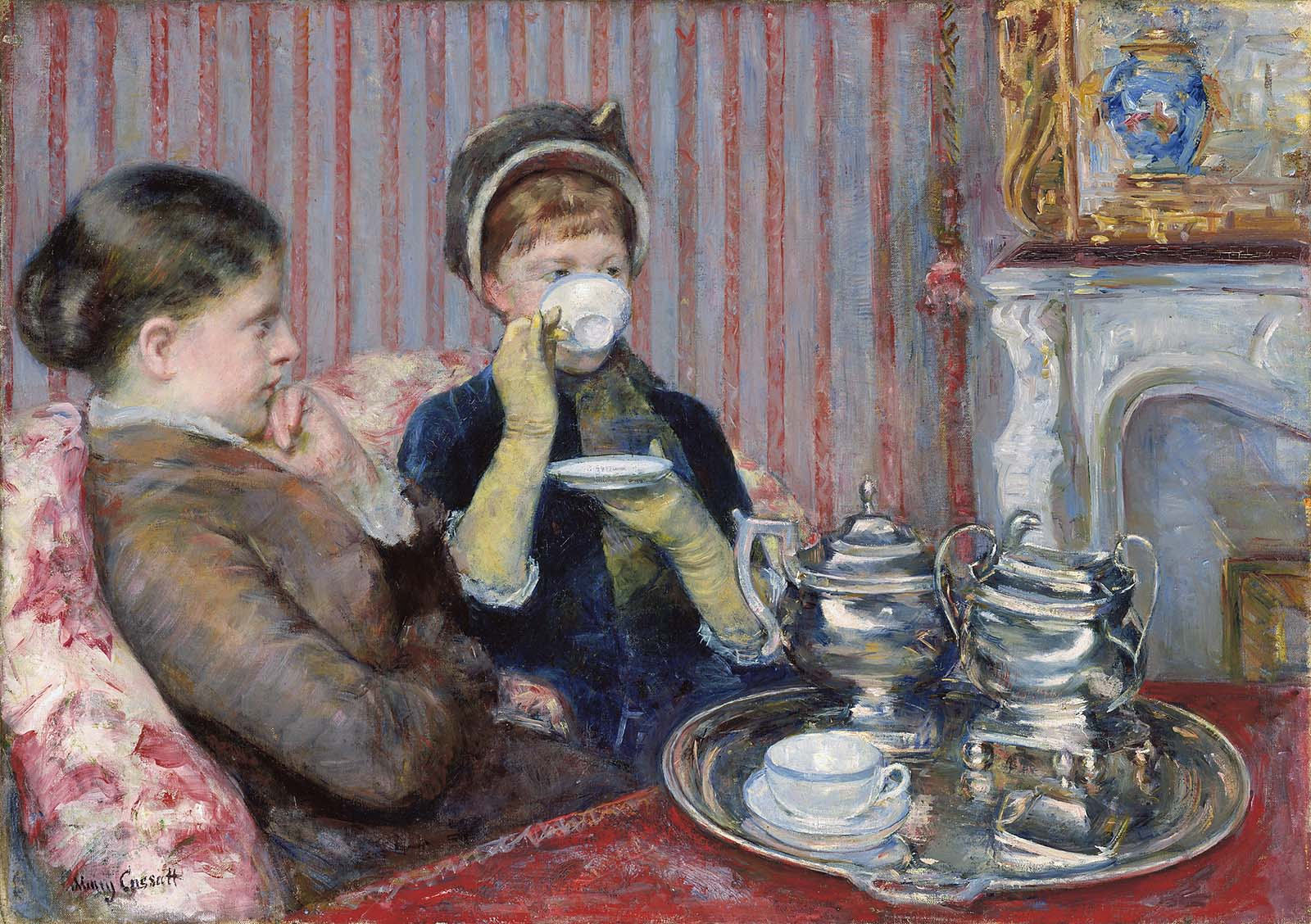
The Cup of Tea, Mary Cassatt (c. 1879)

Some well-known painters include: Jules Breton, Winslow Homer, Thomas Eakins, William Merritt Chase, John Singer Sargent, Mary Cassatt, James Abbott McNeill Whistler, Childe Hassam, John Henry Twachtman, and Maurice Prendergast.

The New York art world took a major turn, seeing an outgrowth of exhibitions and the establishment of major auction houses with a focus on American art. The Gilded Age was pivotal in establishing the New York art world in the international art market.

New York art galleries, clubs, and associations

- American Art Association
- American Watercolor Society
- Ashcan School
- Brummer Gallery
- Century Association
- Colony Club
- Cottier Gallery
- Grand Central Art Galleries
- M. Knoedler
- Lotos Club
- Montross Gallery
- National Association of Portrait Painters
- Salmagundi Club
- Tenth Street Studio of William Merritt Chase
- Union League Club of New York

== Women's roles ==
=== Social activism ===
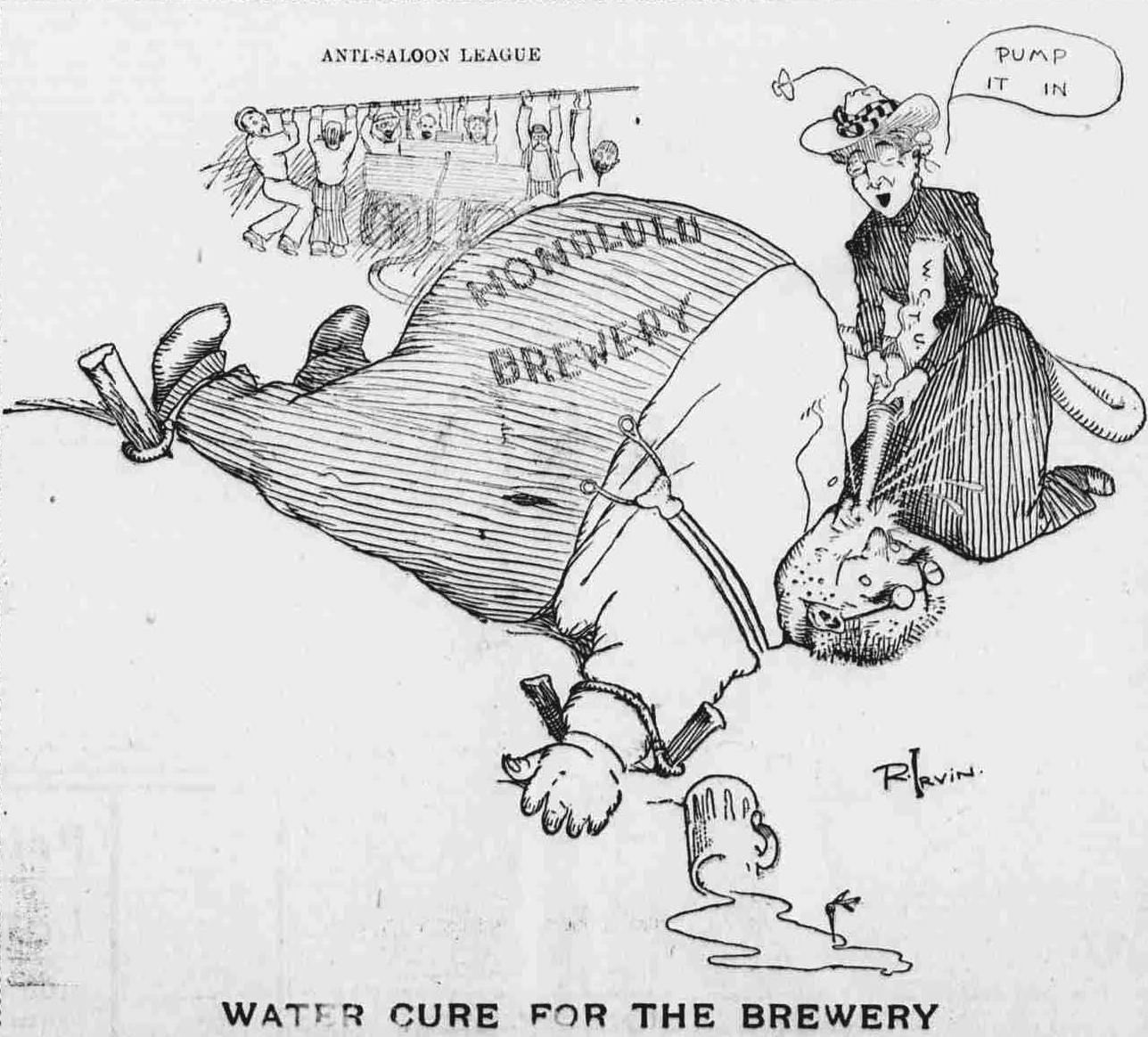
This 1902 cartoon from the Hawaiian Gazette shows a WCTU activist using the water cure to torture a brewmaster as the Anti-Saloon League mans the pump.

Many new social movements took hold in the United States. Many women abolitionists who were disappointed that the Fifteenth Amendment did not extend voting rights to them, remained active in politics, this time focusing on issues important to them. Reviving the temperance movement from the Second Great Awakening, many women joined the Woman's Christian Temperance Union (WCTU) in an attempt to bring morality back to America.

Its chief leader was Frances Willard who had a national and international outreach from her base in Evanston, Illinois. Often the WCTU women took up the issue of women's suffrage which had lain dormant since the Seneca Falls Convention. With leaders like Susan B. Anthony, the National American Woman Suffrage Association was formed to secure the right of women to vote.

=== Employment ===
Many young women worked as servants or in shops and factories until marriage, then typically became full-time housewives. Black, Irish and Swedish adult women often worked as servants. In most large Northern cities, the Irish Catholic women dominated the market for servants. Heavy industry was a male domain, but in light industries such as textiles and food processing, large numbers of young women were hired.

Thousands of young unmarried Irish and French Canadian women worked in Northeastern textile mills. Coming from poor families these jobs meant upward social mobility, more money, and more social prestige in their community that made them more attractive marriage partners. In Cohoes, New York, mill women went on strike in 1882 to gain union recognition. They fought off Swedish strike breakers to protect the status they had achieved.

After 1860, as the larger cities opened department stores, middle-class women did most of the shopping. Increasingly they were served by young middle-class women clerks. Typically, most young women quit their jobs when they married. In some ethnic groups, married women were encouraged to work, especially among African Americans, and Irish Catholics. When the husband operated a small shop or restaurant, wives and other family members could find employment there. Widows and deserted wives often operated boarding houses.

Career women were few. The teaching profession had once been heavily male, but as schooling expanded many women took on teaching careers. If they remained unmarried they could have a prestigious but poorly paid lifetime career in the middle class. At the end of the period nursing schools opened up new opportunities for women, but medical schools remained nearly all male.

Business opportunities were rare, unless it was a matter of a widow taking over her late husband's small business. The rapid acceptance of the sewing machine made housewives more productive and opened up new careers for women running their own small millinery and dressmaking shops. When her husband died, Lydia Moss Bradley (1816–1908) inherited $500,000. Shrewd investments doubled that sum and she later became president of his old bank in Peoria, Illinois. She worked from home to handle banking business. In an age when philanthropists such as Johns Hopkins, Cornell, Purdue, Vanderbilt, Stanford, Rice and Duke were perpetuating their names by founding universities, she lifted her aspirations from the original idea of an orphanage to the loftier goal and in 1897 founded Bradley University in Peoria.

== Social thought ==
A leading magazine, The Nation, espoused classical liberalism in every week's issue starting in 1865, under the influential editor E. L. Godkin. Science played an important part in social thought as the work of Charles Darwin became known among intellectuals. Following Darwin's idea of natural selection, English philosopher Herbert Spencer proposed the idea of social Darwinism. This concept justified the stratification of the wealthy and poor, and it was in this proposal that Spencer coined the term "survival of the fittest".

Joining Spencer was Yale professor William Graham Sumner whose book What Social Classes Owe to Each Other (1884) argues that assistance to the poor actually weakens their ability to survive in society. Sumner argues for a laissez-faire and free-market economy. Few people, however, agreed with the social Darwinists, because they ridiculed religion and denounced philanthropy.

Henry George proposes a "single tax" in his book Progress and Poverty. The tax would be leveled on the rich and poor alike and was proposed in place of all other taxation including: sales tax, income tax, or any other form of taxation. The repeal of these other forms of taxation would result in less waste and abuse, according to George, and would make for an easy method of collecting taxes regardless of income bracket. Economist Thorstein Veblen argues in The Theory of the Leisure Class (1899) that the "conspicuous consumption and conspicuous leisure" of the wealthy had become the basis of social status in America. In Looking Backward (1887), the reformer Edward Bellamy envisions a future America set in 2000 in which a socialist paradise has been established. The works of authors such as George and Bellamy became popular, and soon clubs were created across America to discuss their ideas, although these organizations rarely made any real social change.

== Religion ==
The Third Great Awakening began before the Civil War returned and caused a significant change in religious attitudes toward social progress. Followers of the new awakening promoted the Social Gospel which gave rise to organizations such as the YMCA, the American branch of the Salvation Army, and settlement houses such as Hull House, founded by Jane Addams in Chicago in 1889.

The Third Great Awakening was a period of religious activism in American history from the late 1850s to the 20th century. It affected pietistic Protestant denominations and had a strong sense of social activism. It gathered strength from the postmillennial theology that the Second Coming of Christ would occur after mankind had reformed the entire earth. The Social Gospel movement gained force from the awakening, as did the worldwide missionary movement. All the major denominations sponsored growing missionary activities inside the United States and around the world. New groups emerged such as the Holiness movement and Nazarene movements, Theosophy and Christian Science.

The mainline Protestant denominations, especially the Methodist, Episcopal, Presbyterian, and Congregational churches, grew rapidly in numbers, wealth and educational levels, throwing off their frontier beginnings and becoming centered in towns and cities. Leaders such as Josiah Strong advocated a muscular Christianity with systematic outreach to the unchurched in America and around the globe. Others built colleges and universities to train the next generation. Each denomination supported missionary societies, and made the role of missionary one of high prestige.

The awakening in numerous cities in 1858 was interrupted by the Civil War. In the South, the Civil War stimulated revivals and especially strengthened the Baptists. After the war, Dwight L. Moody made revivalism the centerpiece of his activities in Chicago by founding the Moody Bible Institute. The hymns of Ira Sankey were especially influential.

Across the nation, "drys" crusaded in the name of religion for the prohibition of alcohol. The Woman's Christian Temperance Union mobilized Protestant women for social crusades against liquor, pornography and prostitution, and sparked the demand for women's suffrage. The Gilded Age plutocracy came under harsh attack from the Social Gospel preachers and reformers in the Progressive Era who became involved with issues of child labor, compulsory elementary education and the protection of women from exploitation in factories.

Colleges associated with churches rapidly expanded in number, size and quality of curriculum. The promotion of muscular Christianity became popular among young men on campus and in urban YMCAs, as well as such denominational youth groups such as the Epworth League for Methodists and the Walther League for Lutherans.

== See also ==
- American business history
- History of the United States (1865–1918)
- List of Gilded Age mansions
- New South
- Second Gilded Age, a proposed era for the present-day United States
