= Martha Olney =

American economist

Martha L. Olney
- Born: November 27, 1956 (age 69); Oakland, California
- Spouse: Rev. Esther Hargis

Academic background
- Education: University of Redlands; University of California, Berkeley
- Doctoral advisor: Richard Sutch
- Awards: Distinguished Teaching Award Recipient, University of Massachusetts, Amherst, 1990-1991; Katharine Coman Lecturer in Economic History, Wellesley College, Wellesley, Massachusetts, March 23, 1995; Jonathan Hughes Prize for Excellence in Teaching Economic History, Economic History Association, 1997; Distinguished Teaching Award Recipient, University of California, Berkeley, 2002–2003; Great Teachers in Economics, Stavros Center for Economic Education, Florida State University, 2006–2007; Faculty Award for Outstanding Mentorship of GSIs, University of California, Berkeley, 2014–2015
- Website: http://www.econ.berkeley.edu/~olney; Information at IDEAS / RePEc

Martha Louise Olney (born November 27, 1956) is a teaching professor of economics (2002–present) at the University of California, Berkeley. She is a winner of local and national teaching awards, and has authored several leading undergraduate economics textbooks.

== Education ==
Olney received a B.A. at the University of Redlands and a Ph.D. in economics in 1985 from the University of California, Berkeley.

== Academic career ==
Martha Olney is a teaching professor of economics (2002-) at the University of California, Berkeley. She was previously an associate professor of economics (with tenure) at the University of Massachusetts Amherst. Her early career research focused on consumer durables, the advent of consumer credit in the 1920s, and the Great Depression. She has been awarded the Berkeley Distinguished Teaching Award, which is given to only three professors per year, and the Jonathan Hughes Prize for Excellence in Teaching Economic History, by the Economic History Association (in 1997).

=== Textbook authorship ===
- "Essentials of Economics" with Paul Krugman and Robin Wells
- "Macroeconomics" with J. Bradford DeLong
- "Microeconomics as a Second Language"
- "Macroeconomics as a Second Language"

=== Selected Research publications ===
- Olney, Martha L. Buy now, pay later: advertising, credit, and consumer durables in the 1920s. University of North Carolina Press, 1991.
- Olney, Martha L. "Avoiding default: The role of credit in the consumption collapse of 1930." The Quarterly Journal of Economics 114, no. 1 (1999): 319–335.
- Olney, Martha L. "When your word is not enough: race, collateral, and household credit." The Journal of Economic History 58, no. 2 (1998): 408–431.
- Olney, Martha L. "Credit as a production-smoothing device: the case of automobiles, 1913–1938." The Journal of Economic History 49, no. 2 (1989): 377–391.
