= Richard Sutch =

American economist

Richard C. Sutch
- Died: September 19, 2019; Kensington, CA

Academic background
- Education: Massachusetts Institute of Technology; University of Washington
- Doctoral advisor: Franco Modigliani

Academic work
- Doctoral students: Martha Olney

Richard Charles Sutch (born 1942 - 2019) was a professor of economics at the University of California Riverside. He is noted for his work on the economic analysis of U.S. slavery and emancipation. He was awarded a "Clio" Award For Exceptional Support to the Field of Cliometrics, by the Cliometric Society and his work has received recognition by the Economic History Association via its awarding him the Arthur H. Cole Prize for the Outstanding Article in The Journal of Economic History. Over the period 1989-1990 he served as the president of the Economic History Association.

== Selected publications ==
- Roger L. Ransom; Richard Sutch (2001) [1977]. One Kind of Freedom: The Economic Consequences of Emancipation. Cambridge University Press. ISBN 978-0-521-79550-0.
- Sutch, Richard with Thomas G. Rawski, Susan B. Carter, Jon S. Cohen, Stephen Cullenberg, Peter H. Lindert, Donald N. McCloskey, and Hugh Rockoff. (1996) Economics and the Historian, Berkeley: University of California Press. ISBN 978-0-520-07269-5
