= European Historical Economics Society =

Economic history research organisation

- Abbreviation: EHES
- Formation: 1991
- President: Herman de Jong (University of Groningen)
- Revenue: £25,300 (2018)
- Expenses: £17,000 (2018)
- Website: www.ehes.org

The European Historical Economics Society (EHES) is Europe's leading research organization and learned society dedicated to the study of economic history. Founded in 1991, the EHES supports academic research within the discipline of economic history; organizes an annual conference; publishes regular working papers; and provides resources for early- and mid-career scholars. The EHES promotes "the advancement of education in European economic history through the study of European economies and economic history." The current president of the EHES is Pierre-Cyrille Hautcœur, a French economist and professor of economics at the Paris School of Economics.

The EHES also oversees the European Review of Economic History, a peer-reviewed academic journal published by Oxford University Press on a triannual basis.

== History ==
=== Founding ===
Economic history as a discipline had declined in popularity throughout the 1980s. In 1989, Leandro Prados, then at the University of Santander, organized a World Congress of the Cliometric Society. Subsequent discussions among leading economic historians, especially after the Economic History Association in Leuven in 1990, led to the idea that there was a desire for more research in quantitative economic history.

European economists noted the lack of a society dedicated to this new economic history, and so founded the EHES in 1991. Its first president was Karl Gunnar Persson, a professor at the University of Copenhagen. The first conference in Copenhagen in 1991 included research by Angus Maddison (University of Groningen), Patrick O'Brien (University of Durham), Steve Broadberry (Nuffield College, Oxford University), Rainer Fremdling (University of Groningen), Bart van Ark (The Conference Board), Giovanni Federico (University of Pisa), Jaime Reis (University of Lisbon), Ingrid Henriksen (University of Copenhagen), Vera Zamagni (University of Bologna), Jean-Pierre Dormois (European University Institute), Francesco Galassi (University of Zurich) and Albrecht Ritschl (London School of Economics).

In 1995, the EHES was registered with the Charity Commission for England and Wales.

=== Present day ===
The EHES has been recognized as one of the leaders in the study of pan-European scholarly research. They sponsor interdisciplinary research and cooperation on programs with the Institute for Advanced Study, the Economic History Society, the Economic History Association, the History of Economics Society, and the Cliometric Society.

Members of the EHES also have dual membership with the Cliometric Society and receive copies of the EHES's publication, the European Review of Economic History. The society partners with other scholarly organizations including the International Economic History Association, the Centre for Economic Policy Research, and EuroGlobalNet.

=== Leadership ===
Former presidents of the EHES include:

- Karl Gunnar Persson (University of Copenhagen), 1991–96
- Gianni Toniolo (University of Rome, Duke University), 1996–97
- Jaime Reis (University of Lisbon), 1997–99
- James Foreman-Peck (Cardiff University), 1999-2001
- Leandro Prados (Carlos III University), 2001-2003
- Sevket Pamuk (London School of Economics and Political Science), 2003–05
- Lennart Schon, (Lund University), 2005–07
- Marc Flandreau (University of Pennsylvania, Graduate Institute of International Studies and Development), 2007–09
- Kevin O'Rourke (All Souls College, Oxford University), 2009–11
- Steve Broadberry (Nuffield College, Oxford University), 2011–13
- Giovanni Federico (University of Pisa), 2013–15
- Jörg Baten (University of Tübingen), 2015–17
- Pierre-Cyrille Hautcœur (Paris School of Economics), 2017-2019
- Herman de Jong (University of Groningen), 2019-

== Events ==
=== Annual conference ===
Since 1991, the EHES has hosted an annual conference every three years. In 1999, it was decided that the conference would be every 2 years.

- 1991 - Copenhagen
- 1996 - Venice
- 1999 - Lisbon
- 2001 - Oxford
- 2003 - Madrid
- 2005 - Istanbul
- 2007 - Lund
- 2009 - Geneva
- 2011 - Dublin
- 2013 - London
- 2015 - Pisa
- 2017 - Tübingen
- 2019 - Paris
- 2022 - Groningen
- 2023 - Vienna
- 2025 - Hohenheim

=== Education ===
The EHES hosts an annual summer school based on a new theme each year. The week-long initiative is intended mainly for doctoral and postdoctoral researchers in economic history. The summer school is hosted every three years, and recent topics include:

- 1994 - Productivity and Growth Convergence in Europe
- 1996 - Technology and Long-run Growth in Europe, 1500-1990
- 1998 - Structural Change in Historical Perspective
- 2014 - Institutions, Geography and Economic Development of Eastern Europe in the Long-Run
- 2015 - Beyond GDP: A Long-Term View on Human Wellbeing and Inequality
- 2017 - Geography, Institutions and Economic Growth in History

== Journal ==
Following the establishment of the regular conferences, workshops, and summer schools, the EHES decided to begin publishing an academic, peer-reviewed journal. Founded in 1997, the European Review of Economic History (EREH), printed by Cambridge University Press, aims to encourage the study of modern economic history. It is recognized as one of the leading publications in the field. The journal is an outlet for research into European, comparative and global economic history. As of 2019, the current editors of the journal are Jaime Reis, Hans-Joachim Voth and Cormac Ó Gráda. The five-year impact factor of the journal is 1.205 (as of 2017). Research from the EHES has been published in the BBC and The Economist. The EREH also sponsors the Figuerola Prize, a biannual award for the best article published in the journal. Prize winners receive €2,000.
