= Cormac Ó Gráda =

Irish economic historian (born 1945)

- Born: December 3, 1945 (age 80)
- Education: University College Dublin; Columbia University
- Occupation: Economic historian
- Known for: Economic history of the Irish famine

Cormac Ó Gráda (born 1945) is an Irish economic historian and professor emeritus of economics at University College Dublin. His research has focused on the economic history of Ireland, Irish demographic changes, the Great Irish Famine (as well as other famines), and the history of the Jews in Ireland.

== Life and career ==
After getting his undergraduate degree at the University College Dublin, Ó Gráda got his Ph.D. in economics from Columbia University in 1973, where he wrote his dissertation on the Irish economy before and after the Great Famine. He described his early academic career as being "a kind of jack-of-all-trades economic historian of Ireland". He credits fellow economist Joel Mokyr, whom he met in 1977 through Michael Edelstein, his graduate thesis advisor at Columbia, as the "greatest influence" on his academic work. Mokyr also sharpened his interest in the Great Irish Famine, which "led eventually to the study of famines elsewhere".

He is a member of the Cliometric Society, the Economic History Society, the European Historical Economics Society, the Irish Economic and Social History Society, and the Royal Irish Academy. He has served on the editorial boards of Journal of Economic History, Explorations in Economic History, and the Agricultural History Review, and is a former coeditor for the European Review of Economic History. He is the President of the Economic History Association.

In fall 2007, he was a member at Princeton's Institute for Advanced Study as a member of the School of Historical Studies. In 2010, he won a Gold Medal from the Royal Irish Academy, of which he has been a member since 1994. He has been a visiting professor to a number of universities around the world, including the University of British Columbia, New York University, Carleton College, the University of Copenhagen, and Princeton University. In 2019, Trinity College Dublin awarded him with an honorary doctorate.

== Publications ==
Ó Gráda is a prolific writer. He has written and published seven books in addition to numerous journal articles and collaborations, with over 100 academic papers available online. He has contributed to the "Irish Economy" blog, where he commented on the Irish financial crisis. Earlier in 2008, he gave an open verdict on the future of the Celtic Tiger economy that was about to wind down.

He was also interviewed in an In Our Time (BBC) discussion programme on the Great Irish Famine in April 2019.

=== Books ===
- Ireland: A New Economic History, 1780-1939. Oxford: Oxford University Press. 1994. ISBN 9780198205982.
- A Rocky Road: The Irish Economy Since the 1920s. Manchester: Manchester University Press. 1997. ISBN 9780719045844.
- Black '47 and Beyond: The Great Irish Famine in History, Economy, and Memory. Princeton, NJ: Princeton University Press. 1999. ISBN 978-0691070155.
- Famine Demography: Evidence from the Past and the Present. Oxford: Oxford University Press. 2002. ISBN 9780199251919.
- Jewish Ireland in the Age of Joyce: A Socioeconomic History. Princeton, NJ: Princeton University Press. 2006. ISBN 9780691127194.
- Famine: A Short History. Princeton, NJ: Princeton University Press. 2009. ISBN 9780691147970.
- Eating People Is Wrong, and Other Essays on Famine, Its Past, and Its Future. Princeton, NJ: Princeton University Press. 2015. ISBN 9781400865819.

The American Conference for Irish Studies awarded the James S. Donnelly, Sr. Prize to two of his books, Black '47 and Beyond (1999) and Jewish Ireland in the Age of Joyce (2006).

=== Journal articles ===
- Boyle, Phelim P.; Ó Gráda, Cormac (November 1986). "Fertility Trends, Excess Mortality, and the Great Irish Famine". Demography. 23 (4): 543–562. doi:10.2307/2061350. hdl:10197/1404. JSTOR 2061350. PMID 3542599. S2CID 43621998., with
- Allen, Robert C.; Ó Gráda, Cormac (March 1988). "On the road again with Arthur Young: English, Irish, and French agriculture during the Industrial Revolution". The Journal of Economic History. 48 (1): 93–116. doi:10.1017/S0022050700004162. hdl:10197/1943. S2CID 154177835.
- Kelly, Morgan; Ó Gráda, Cormac (December 2000). "Market Contagion: Evidence from the Panics of 1854 and 1857". American Economic Review. 90 (5): 1110–1124. doi:10.1257/aer.90.5.1110. hdl:10197/459. S2CID 17705462.
- Ó Gráda, Cormac (March 2007). "Making Famine History". Journal of Economic Literature. 45 (1): 5–38. doi:10.1257/jel.45.1.5. hdl:10197/492. S2CID 54763671.

== See also ==
- Cliometrics
- Great Famine (Ireland)
- Joel Mokyr
