= Şevket Pamuk =

Turkish economic historian (born 1950)

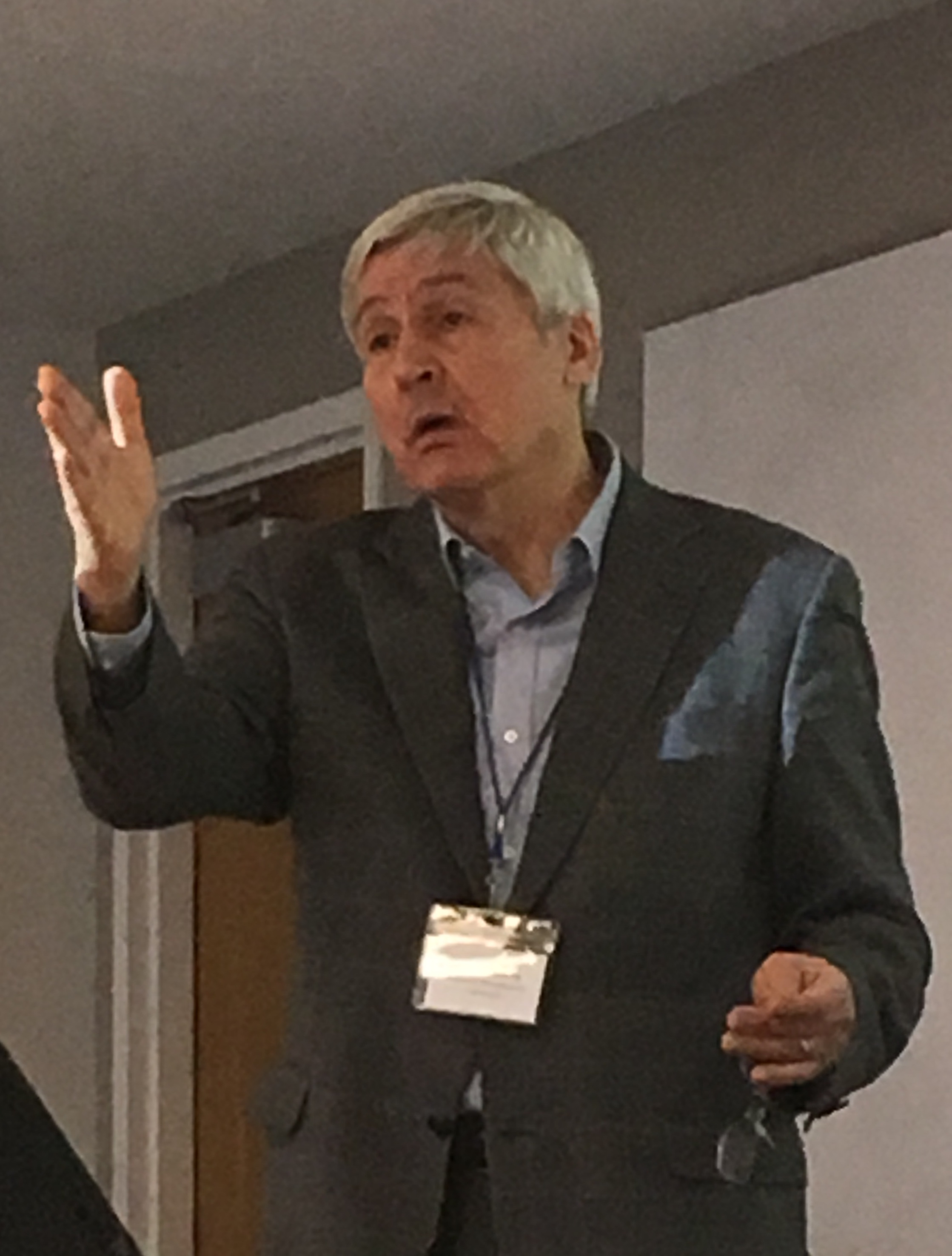
- Occupations: Economist; Historian
- Relatives: Orhan Pamuk (brother)

Academic background
- Education: Robert College
- Alma mater: Yale University (BA, BS); University of California, Berkeley (MA, PhD)

Academic work
- Discipline: Economic history
- Institutions: Boğaziçi University

Şevket Pamuk is retired professor of Economics and Economic History at Boğaziçi University and author of prize-winning books and articles. Between 2007 and 2013, Pamuk was chair of Contemporary Turkish Studies at the European Institute, London School of Economics and Political Science.

He is a leading economic historian of the Ottoman Empire, the Middle East and modern Turkey. He is also the author of The Ottoman Empire and European Capitalism 1820–1913: Trade, Investment and Production (Cambridge University Press, 1987) and A Monetary History of the Ottoman Empire (Cambridge University Press, 2000). He co-authored A History of Middle East Economies in the Twentieth Century (1999) with Harvard-based historian Roger Owen. A collection of his articles on the Ottoman economy appeared as Ottoman Economy and Its Institutions (Ashgate-Variorum, 2008). His research interests include Turkish economic history since 1800, the Ottoman economy in the early modern era, and economic growth in the Balkans and the Middle East since 1800. His last book published in Turkish in 2014 and in English in 2018 examines Turkey's record of economic growth and institutional change during the last two centuries. This book won the British-Kuwaiti Friendship Society prize for the best book published on the Middle East in 2018. It has also been published in Greek and Chinese. He continues to work on the economic history of Ottoman Empire, modern Turkey, the Middle East and Europe.

== Biography ==
Pamuk was born in Istanbul. After attending high school at Robert College, in Istanbul, Pamuk graduated from Yale University (1972) and obtained his PhD degree in economics from the University of California, Berkeley (1978). He has since taught at various universities in Turkey and the United States, including Ankara, Pennsylvania, Villanova, Princeton, Michigan at Ann Arbor, Northwestern, and beginning in 1994 at Boğaziçi University, Istanbul, as Professor of Economics and Economic History. In 1990 and 1991, he taught at the Department of Economics at Middle East Technical University (METU), Ankara. Pamuk was professor and chair of contemporary Turkish studies at the European Institute, London School of Economics and Political Science, during 2008–13. He taught economic history courses at Harvard University as a visiting professor in 2024.

Pamuk was the president of the European Historical Economics Society, an association of European economic historians, and the president of the Asian Historical Economics Society, was a member of the executive committee of the International Economic History Association, a member of the Standing Committee on the Humanities of the European Science Foundation. He is also a member of the Science Academy (Turkish: Bilim Akademisi), Turkey and a member of Academia Europaea. He was an editor of the European Review of Economic History. He was elected an International Fellow of the British Academy in 2021.

Şevket Pamuk is the older brother of Nobel Prize-winning novelist Orhan Pamuk, and also has a younger half-sister, Hümeyra Pamuk, who is a journalist. He is married to Yeşim Arat Pamuk, retired professor of political science at Boğaziçi University. Their daughter Zeynep is associate professor of political theory at Nuffield College, Oxford.

== Publications ==
- "Publications in English"
