= A Farewell to Alms =

2007 book on Malthusian economic history by Gregory Clark

A Farewell to Alms: A Brief Economic History of the World
- Author: Gregory Clark
- Language: English
- Subject: Economics, social evolution
- Published: 2007 (Princeton University Press)
- Publication place: United States
- Media type: Hardcover, Paperback, Audio CD, Audio Cassette, Audio Download
- Pages: 432 pages (Princeton edition, paperback)
- ISBN: 0-691-14128-2 (Princeton edition, paperback)

A Farewell to Alms: A Brief Economic History of the World is a 2007 book about economic history by Gregory Clark. It is published by Princeton University Press.

The book's title, like Clark's other book The Son Also Rises, is a pun on Ernest Hemingway's novel, A Farewell to Arms.

== Content ==
The book discusses the divide between rich and poor nations that came about as a result of the Industrial Revolution in terms of the evolution of particular behaviours that Clark claims first occurred in Britain. Prior to 1790, Clark asserts that man faced a Malthusian trap: new technology enabled greater productivity and more food, but was quickly gobbled up by higher populations.

In Britain, however, as disease continually killed off poorer members of society, their positions in society were taken over by the descendants of the wealthy. In that way, according to Clark, less violent, more literate and more hard-working behaviour – middle-class values – were spread culturally and biologically throughout the population. This process of "downward social mobility" eventually enabled Britain to attain a rate of productivity that allowed it to break out of the Malthusian trap. Clark sees this process, continuing today, as the major factor why some countries are poor and others are rich.

== Responses ==
With its theses, the book received attention and several reviews from newspapers and scholars. Christof Dejung from the University of Konstanz criticised the book for not considering the oppressive aspects of colonialism, and concluded: "It seems that the warm welcome the book has found in some circles comes not least from the fact that it discharges the West from every responsibility for the grinding poverty most people on the globe are living in until today." The book has received praise from authors like Benjamin M. Friedman and Tyler Cowen (Mercatus Center director) ("idea-rich book", maybe "next blockbuster in economics"), although authors from this political direction do not all agree fully with the theses of the book. For example, Kuznicki from the libertarian Cato Institute stated, in a generally positive review, that "his explanation begins to look very ad hoc when considering the last few decades".

Deirdre McCloskey (University of Illinois) wrote about Clark's theses on genetic influence, that "the main failure of his hypothesis is, oddly, that a book filled with ingenious calculations... does not calculate enough. It doesn't ask or answer the crucial historical questions." She concluded: [ "...Clark's socio-neoDarwinianism, which he appears to have acquired from a recent article by some economic theorists, has as little to recommend it as history." The economist Karl Gunnar Persson opined that Clark's Malthusianism "is at times more evangelical than empirical and analytical". John S. Lyons (Miami University) concluded his review with humour in the Journal of Socio-Economics with the claim: "casual observation suggests that reviewers have pointed to at least one distinct fault in the book for every two pages or so".

Even more critical are Robert C. Allen, and David Warsh, Hans-Joachim Voth. calls the book "unique. It is bold, insightful, funny and erudite." However, he argues that conceptually, Greg Clark's book is mainly based on a paper by authors Galor and Moav from 2002 and that Clark has just added some "fragmentary and probably unrepresentative" points of evidence.

Some mixed reviews were critical of the theses and statistics but evaluated the book as well written and interesting. Robert Solow disagreed on the main thesis and accented instead for example institutional changes as reasons for industrialisation. He described some part of the book as stereotypical, some parts as fascinating and thought-provoking—and some parts as just irritating. John S. Lyons, who has worked together with Clark, stated that there are many mistakes in the book, but thinks of the book as interesting though: "wrong in parts, inadequate in others, yet suggestive elsewhere, and fascinating even when annoying".

=== Clark's rejoinder and subsequent publications ===
Clark responded to some of his critics, including McCloskey and Voth, in a journal article for the European Review of Economic History. In this article, Clark argues, using an estimate of heritability of wealth derived from his data, that "the wealthy in pre-industrial England had to be different in personality and culture from the poor". He says such differences must have been relevant to economic success, and could have been passed on by culture, genetics or a combination of the two. However, he goes on to state that "the rich in modern industrial society are genetically different from the poor", citing twin studies showing a greater correlation of incomes between identical twins than non-identical twins, as well as differences in outcomes for biological children versus adopted children. He therefore suggests that A Farewell to Alms' hypothesis of how statistically significant genetic differences between the rich and the poor might have arisen "is a very real possibility".

Other economic historians have since noted that "there is no consistent evidence for the hypothesis that socioeconomic status was positively related to fertility before the demographic transition", and that the idea of the survival of the richest is not empirically clear, with the evidence stronger in Asia and weaker in Europe and North America.

== See also ==
- A Troublesome Inheritance, a book partly inspired by A Farewell to Alms
- The Son Also Rises, a related 2014 book by the same author, about social mobility.
