= Stephen Broadberry =

British economist and academic

Stephen Noel Broadberry FBA (born 8 December 1956) is a British economist and academic. He is Professor of Economic History at the University of Oxford, and a professorial fellow at Nuffield College, Oxford. He has been editor of the Economic History Review, the Essays in Economic and Business History, and the European Review of Economic History. He is president of the Economic History Society and was president of the European Historical Economics Society. He was elected a Fellow of the British Academy (FBA) in 2016. Broadberry received a B.A. (Honors, First Class) in Economics and Economic History from the University of Warwick in 1978 and a M.Phil/D.Phil from the University of Oxford in Economics in 1982.

== Selected publications ==
- The British Economy Between the Wars: A Macroeconomic Survey. Blackwell, 1986.
- The Productivity Race, 1850-1990: British Manufacturing in International Perspective, 1850-1990. Cambridge University Press, Cambridge, 1997.
- Market Services and the Productivity Race, 1850-2000: British Performance in International Perspective. Cambridge University Press, Cambridge, 2006.
- Cambridge Economic History of Europe. Cambridge University Press, Cambridge, 2010.(edited with Kevin O'Rourke)
- British Economic Growth, 1270-1870, co-authored with Bruce Campbell, Alexander Klein, Mark Overton and Bas van Leeuwen. Cambridge University Press, 2015.
