= Middle-class values =

The term middle-class values is used by various writers and politicians to include such qualities as hard work, self-discipline, thrift, honesty, aspiration and ambition. Thus, people in lower or upper classes can also possess middle-class values, they are not exclusive to people who are actually middle-class. Contemporary politicians in Western countries frequently refer to such values, and to the middle-class families that uphold them, as worthy of political support.

== Contrasts ==
Middle-class values can be contrasted with other values that may be held by other people belonging to other classes and historical time periods, such as:

- Tribal thinking or clannishness
- Contentment with a low material standard of living
- Valorisation of strength and petty violence
- Anti-intellectualism
- Criminality
- A life of easy leisure and being served by servants (a value often exhibited by the upper classes), as opposed to hard work
- Bohemian values - rejecting middle class materialism, embracing artistic creation
- Religious fundamentalism (various types) - rejecting earthly goals (illusions) and/or disdaining middle class empiricism and material desires
- Contrarianism - rejecting various aspects of middle class life and values
- Revolutionary - aiming through political or cultural means to overturn or destroy the existing societal order, replacing it with a different system
- Utopianism - striving to design and/or create a perfect or ideal society (in practice, as a small community within a larger state)
- Absurdism - rejecting given values systems and seeking to understand the true value and meaning of life, while accepting that such understanding is impossible

== History ==
=== Spread of middle-class values ===
British economic historian Gregory Clark has controversially claimed, in his book A Farewell to Alms, on the basis of extensive research, that Britain may have been where the Industrial Revolution began because the British people had a head start in "evolving" – through a combination of cultural and possibly even genetic changes – a critical mass of people with middle-class values.

Others have claimed, by contrast, that the "natural inclination" of workers at the early stages of the Industrial Revolution was to work as few hours as needed to earn a subsistence living, and workers had to be brainwashed into working long hours. Some have claimed that compulsory education and advertising played a part in this brainwashing - compulsory education instilling obedience and hard work at an early age, and advertising instilling desire for consumer goods that had to be paid for with more work.

In A Farewell to Alms Clark disputes such explanations, citing persistent large differences in labour productivity in India and Britain, even when British managers and identical machines to those used in Britain were used, and even though both countries have compulsory education for children.

== Mechanism of transmission ==
Since the middle class is the dominant class in western modernity (specifically after the industrial revolution), middle-class values hold cultural capital and hegemony over western modernial cultures. Middle class values are thus imposed upon an entire population through economic and cultural means. That is, those living within the bounds of western modernity must conform to middle-class expectations in order to gain access to wealth or cultural legibility. Middle-class values, or the lack thereof, are transmitted from parents to children, by schools, by employers, and by mainstream media, such as the quintessentially middle-class newspaper The Daily Mail.

According to Gregory Clark, it is possible that there is also a substantial genetic component, and this is why social mobility is so low across societies and across history, as he establishes in his book The Son Also Rises.

== See also ==
- Protestant work ethic
- Achievement ideology
- Laziness
