= Arat =

Arat is a Persian and Turkish male given name and also a surname. The term can also refer to:

- Arat (name), list of people with the name
- Arat Bon, village in Mazandaran, Iran
- Aromatic-amino-acid transaminase, enzyme
