= Hans-Joachim Voth =

German economic historian (born 1968)

Hans-Joachim Voth (born March 31, 1968) is a German economic historian who has served as the UBS Foundation Professor of Economics at the University of Zürich since 2016. He has also served as the Scientific Director of the UBS Center for Economics in Society since 2017. He was elected a Fellow of the Econometric Society in 2022, and is an associate editor of the Journal of Economic Growth.

== Early life and education ==
Born in Lübeck in 1968, Voth studied economics, history, and philosophy at the universities of Bonn and Freiburg from 1989 to 1991. He then spent a year as a visiting student at St Antony's College, Oxford, where he received an MSc in 1993. After spending a year as a doctoral student at the European University Institute in Florence, he graduated with a DPhil from Nuffield College, Oxford, in 1996. His dissertation won the Economic History Association’s Alexander Gerschenkron Prize in 1996, and the 1999 Gino Luzzatto Prize for best dissertation by the European Historical Economics Society.

== Career ==
Voth was a research fellow at Clare College, Cambridge from 1995 to 1996. From 1996 to 1997, he worked for McKinsey & Company as an associate in its Financial Institutions Group. After visiting the Department of Economics at Stanford University for a year, Voth joined Pompeu Fabra University as an assistant professor in 1998, where he was tenured in 2001, and became a full professor in 2003. Between 1999 and 2003 he was also Deputy Director of the Centre for History and Economics at the University of Cambridge, and visited the Department of Economics at MIT in 2001-02 and 2002-03. Voth held a ICREA research chair at UPF from 2005-14. He was also a visiting professor at NYU Stern (2004-05), Princeton University (2007-08), and Berkeley-Haas (2016-17). Voth joined the University of Zürich in 2014, where he was appointed the UBS Foundation Professor of Economics in 2016, and serves as Scientific Director of the UBS Center for Economics in Society since 2017

Voth is an associate editor of the Journal of Economic Growth, and previously helped edit various other academic journals, including the Economic Journal (2015–21), Explorations in Economic History (2013–15), The Quarterly Journal of Economics (2011–21), and the European Review of Economic History (2008–12). He is also a Fellow of the Royal Historical Society and a Research Fellow at the Centre for Economic Policy Research.

== Research ==
Voth is the author of three academic books:

- Lending to the Borrower from Hell: Debt, Taxes, and Default in the Age of Philip II [with Mauricio Drelichman], Princeton: Princeton University Press, 2014.
- Prometheus Shackled: Goldsmith Banks and England's Financial Revolution after 1700 [with Peter Temin], Oxford/New York: Oxford University Press, 2013.
- Time and Work in England, 1750-1830, Oxford: Oxford University Press, 2001.

In addition, he has written three trade books more than 60 academic articles on economics, financial markets, and economic history. His research has been published in the AER, QJE, JPE, RESTUD, The Journal of Finance, PNAS, JEEA, AER:Insights, EJ, RESTAT, AEJ:Applied, and all leading economic history journals. His most recent research is on state capacity, long-run growth, the persistence of culture, sovereign debt in historical perspective, the link between economic crisis and political violence and the Great Depression and the German Interwar Economy. Voth has also written about time use in industrializing societies.

== Distinctions and honors ==
Voth has won several prizes. In addition to two prizes for best dissertation and election to the Econometric Society in 2022, he won a Leverhulme Prize Fellowship, the Larry Neal Prize for best paper in Explorations in Economic History in 2010-11 (with Mauricio Drelichman), the Albert Hirschman Award for best writing in global political economy, and the Montias Prize for best paper in the Journal of Comparative Economics in 2020-21 (with Jacopo Ponticelli). His research has attracted external funding of more than €4.3 million, including a European Research Council Advanced Grant. He has delivered the Tawney Memorial Lecture at the EHS, Cambridge, April 2011, the Sir John Hicks Lecture in Oxford, 2016, and the NFR Crafts Lecture in Warwick (2021), as well as keynotes at numerous conferences and workshops. His research has - as of November 2025 - been cited more than 11,000 times, and he has an h-index of 49.
