= June Sheppard =

British historical geographer

June Alice Sheppard (1928-2016) was a British historical geographer.

== Life ==
June Sheppard was born in Purley, Surrey on 24 June 1928. She was educated at Whyteleafe County School for Girls and studied geography at University College, Hull, graduating with an external University of London degree in 1949. Sheppard continued at Hull, gaining her PhD from the University of London in 1956. In May 1953 she was appointed assistant lecturer in geography at Queen Mary College, In 1972 she was made Reader in Geography, and she remained at Queen Mary College until her retirement in 1991. She died in 2016.

== Works ==
- The draining of the Hull valley. [Micklegate, Eng.]: East Yorkshire Local History Society, 1958.
- 'East Yorkshire's agricultural labour force in the mid-nineteenth century', Agricultural History Review, Vol. 9, No. 1 (1961), pp. 43–54.
- 'Rural population changes since 1851: three sample studies', The Sociological Review, Vol. 10, No. 1 (1962), p. 81-95.
- The draining of the marshlands of South Holderness and the Vale of York, York: East Yorkshire Local History Society, 1966.
- 'Medieval village planning in Northern England : some evidence from Yorkshire', Journal of Historical Geography, Vol. 2, No. 1 (1976), pp. 3–20.
- The origins and evolution of field and settlement patterns in the Herefordshire Manor of Marden. London: Department of Geography, Queen Mary College, 1979.
- 'Small farms in a Sussex weald parish, 1800-60', Agricultural History Review, Vol. 40, No. 2 (1992), pp. 127–141.
- A century of geography : a history of the geography department of East London College (to 1935), Queen Mary College (1935-1989), Queen Mary and Westfield College (1989- ), 1994.
- Brighton's railway workers in the 1850s. Sussex: Sussex Archaeological Collections, 2001.
- The provenance of Brighton's railway workers 1841-1861. 2004.
- 'Agricultural workers in mid nineteenth-century Brighton', Agricultural History Review, Vol. 54, No. 1 (2006), pp. 93–104.
