= Kevin O'Rourke =

Kevin O'Rourke may refer to:

- Kevin O'Rourke (economist), Irish economist and historian
- Kevin O'Rourke (actor), American actor
