= Kevin O'Rourke (economist) =

Irish economist and historian

Kevin O'Rourke MRIA FBA
- Born: 25 March 1963 (age 63)

Academic background
- Education: Trinity College Dublin; Harvard University
- Thesis: Agricultural Change and Rural Depopulation: Ireland 1845–76 (1989)

Academic work
- Discipline: Economics
- Institutions: Graduate School of Business, Columbia University; University College, Dublin; Trinity College, Dublin; University of Oxford; All Souls College, Oxford; New York University Abu Dhabi

Kevin Hjortshøj O'Rourke, MRIA, FBA (born 25 March 1963) is an Irish economist and historian, who specialises in economic history and international economics. Since 2024 he has been a Research Director at the CNRS, and a Professor of Economics at Sciences Po, Paris. He was Professor of Economics at Trinity College, Dublin from 2000 to 2011, and had previously taught at Columbia University and University College, Dublin. From 2011 to 2019, he was Chichele Professor of Economic History at the University of Oxford and a Fellow of All Souls College, Oxford. He was a Professor of Economics at New York University Abu Dhabi between 2019 and 2024.

== Early life and education ==
O'Rourke was born on 25 March 1963 in Bern, Switzerland. His father, Andrew O'Rourke, was a senior Irish diplomat who had served as ambassador to the United Kingdom and France among others.

From 1980 to 1984, he studied economics and maths at Trinity College Dublin, and was elected a Scholar of the college in 1982. He graduated in 1984 with a first class honours Bachelor of Arts (BA) degree; as per tradition, his BA was later promoted to a Master of Arts (MA Dubl) degree. From 1984 to 1989, he attended Harvard University, where he undertook postgraduate studies in economics. He was awarded a Master of Arts (AM) degree in June 1986 and a Doctor of Philosophy (PhD) degree in June 1989.

His dissertation was titled "Agricultural Change and Rural Depopulation: Ireland 1845–76". Using computable general equilibrium techniques, and detailed statistics on the Irish economy collected by the UK administration, he challenged the hypothesis that Ireland's Great Famine was merely an inevitable acceleration of existing trends. His work showed that rural depopulation was not linked to relative price changes for agricultural goods, rather that it was driven by a (sudden, Famine-induced) change in the structure of the agricultural industry, in particular the use of potato as an input, as well as greater opportunities for Irish labourers abroad, in particular in the US, due to the again-sudden existence of emigrant networks and information flows back to Ireland.

== Academic career ==
From 1989 to 1992, O'Rourke was an assistant professor in the Graduate School of Business, Columbia University. In 1992, he moved to University College, Dublin as a college lecturer in its Department of Economics. He was promoted to statutory lecturer in 1997. For the spring of 1999, he was a visiting associate professor in the Department of Economics, Harvard University. During this time, O'Rourke established himself as one of the leading scholars on nineteenth-century globalization, together with Jeffrey Williamson, his former PhD advisor. Their book 'Globalization and History' won the Economics category of the APA 1999 Professional/Scholarly Publishing Annual Awards Competition.

In 2000, he moved to Trinity College, Dublin where he was appointed Professor of Economics. In Spring 2005, he was a visiting professor to Institut d'Études Politiques de Paris (Sciences Po). During his time at Trinity, he expanded his research on international trade, culminating in 'Power & Plenty', a history of the world economy in the second millennium. Later in the decade, as the Great Recession struck, O'Rourke became interested in the parallels between it and the Great Depression. Posts at popular economics blog VoxEU by O'Rourke and Barry Eichengreen on the topic remain the most popular articles ever published on the site.

From 2009 to 2011, O'Rourke was the President of the European Historical Economics Society, a learned society of European economic historians. He has also served as editor of the organization's publication, the European Review of Economic History, and is currently an editor of the Economic History Review. He has also served on the editorial boards of other peer-reviewed academic journals, including the Journal of Economic History, World Politics, and Oxford Economic Papers.

In 2011, O'Rourke joined the University of Oxford as Chichele Professor of Economic History. With this appointment, he was also elected a University Academic Fellow of All Souls College, Oxford. In January 2014, he additionally became research director of the Centre for Economic Policy Research (CEPR), a European charity. In 2019, he left Oxford and moved to the United Arab Emirates where he joined New York University Abu Dhabi as Professor of Economics. In 2024 he moved back to Europe, joining the CNRS and Sciences Po.

== Honours ==
In 2009, O'Rourke was elected Member of the Royal Irish Academy (MRIA), an all-Ireland learned society. In 2013, he was elected a Fellow of the British Academy (FBA), the United Kingdom's national academy for the humanities and social sciences.

== Selected works ==
- O'Rourke, Kevin H.; Williamson, Jeffrey G. (1999). Globalization and history: the evolution of a nineteenth-century Atlantic economy. Cambridge, Mass.: MIT Press. ISBN 0262150492.
- Findlay, Ronald; O'Rourke, Kevin H. (2007). Power and plenty: trade, war, and the world economy in the second millennium. Princeton, N.J.: Princeton University Press. ISBN 978-0691143279.
- Broadberry, Stephen; O'Rourke, Kevin H., eds. (2010). The Cambridge economic history of modern Europe. New York: Cambridge University Press. ISBN 978-0521882026.
- O'Rourke, Kevin H. 2019. A Short History of Brexit. Penguin.
