= Gregory Clark (economist) =

British economic historian

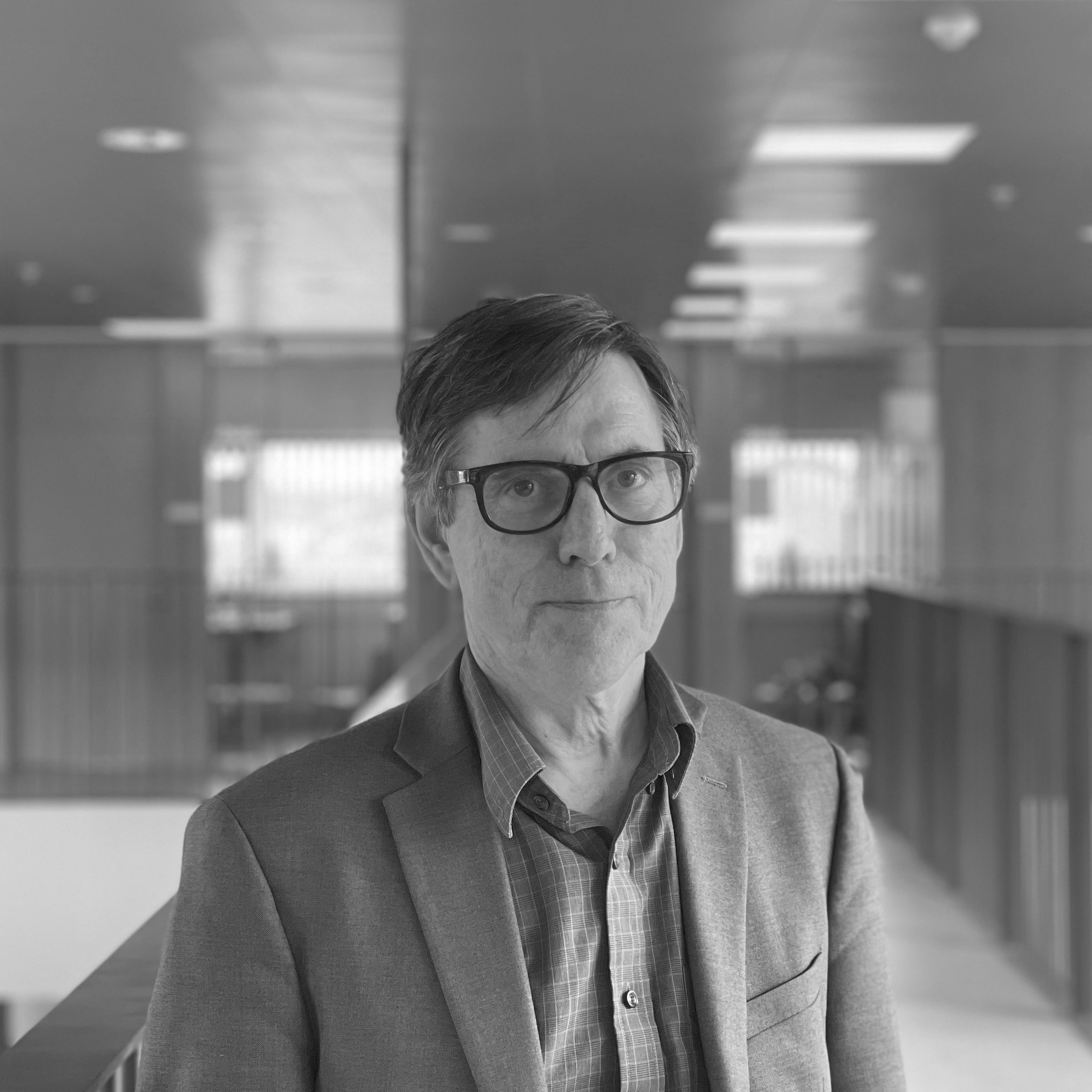
- Clark in May 2023
- Born: 19 September 1957 (age 69); Bellshill, Scotland

Academic background
- Education: University of Cambridge (BA); Harvard University (PhD)

Academic work
- Discipline: Macroeconomics, economic history
- Institutions: University of Southern Denmark; University of California, Davis; London School of Economics; University of Michigan; Stanford University

Gregory Clark (born 19 September 1957) is a British economic historian who worked mostly at University of California, Davis and is now the Danish National Research Council professor of economics at the University of Southern Denmark. He is known for his economic research on the industrial revolution and social mobility.

== Biography ==
Clark, whose grandfathers were migrants to Scotland from Ireland, was born in Bellshill, Scotland. He attended Holy Cross High School in Hamilton. In 1974 he and fellow pupil Paul Fitzpatrick won the Scottish Daily Express schools debating competition. He earned a BA degree in economics and philosophy at King's College, Cambridge in 1979 and a PhD in economics at Harvard University in 1985. His thesis was supervised by Barry Eichengreen, Jeffrey G. Williamson, and Stephen Marglin. He became an assistant professor at Stanford University from 1985 to 1989 and at the University of Michigan from 1989 to 1990. He moved to the University of California, Davis and became associate professor in 1990 and professor of economics in 1996. He was formerly (until 2013) chair of the economics department at the University of California, Davis and became a distinguished professor emeritus there since 2018. Between 2017 and 2020, Clark was a visiting professor in economic history at the London School of Economics. In 2023, he became the Danish National Research Council professor of economics at the University of Southern Denmark.

Clark's areas of research are long-term economic growth, the wealth of nations, the economic history of The Industrial Revolution, England and India, and social mobility. He is also a visiting professor in the Economic History Department at London School of Economics and a Distinguished Professor Emeritus at the University of California, Davis.

In 2021, a talk by Clark, titled "For Whom the Bell Curve Tolls: A Lineage of 400,000 Individuals 1750-2020 Shows Genetics Determines Most Social Outcomes", was cancelled due to accusations of promoting eugenics. (Note: The title is a reference to Herrnstein and Murray's book The Bell Curve, as well as, like Clark's first two books, a Hemingway pun.) In 2023, he published a paper arguing that in England, social status persists strongly even for distant relatives, and that the strength of this status correlation between relatives depends on how closely they're related. These correlations match the predictions of a simple genetic model developed in 1918 by Ronald Fisher. The resulting book, To Have and Have Not: The Determinants of Social Status in England, 1600-2026, was ultimately published online in Econ Journal Watch in 2026.

== Responses ==
In a review for The New York Times, Benjamin Friedman described A Farewell to Alms as a stimulating work of economic history, but argued that Clark did not establish whether the behavioral changes central to the book's thesis were genetic or cultural.

An article by Stephen Broadberry, Bruce M.S. Campbell, and Bas van Leeuwen, When did Britain industrialise? The sectoral distribution of the labour force and labour productivity in Britain, 1381–1851, finds that 58% of the labor force during the mid-sixteenth century was still employed in agriculture, which is approximately in line with Clark's findings. They mention that they believe the proportion of agriculture in the labor force was decreasing decisively from at least the middle of the seventeenth century, while Clark suggests that the decrease began much later. In addition, they state that Clark's perspective is not easily reconciled with English urbanization changes during the seventeenth century.

Clark's findings have sparked considerable debate, particularly regarding the role of genetics in social mobility. Critics argue that his emphasis on heritability risks downplaying structural factors that perpetuate inequality, such as racism, sexism, and class-based discrimination.

Clark's assertion that public policies have limited long-term effects on mobility has also been controversial. Many scholars contend that interventions in education, healthcare, and housing can significantly affect individuals and communities, even if the impacts are not immediately visible across generations. These controversies culminated in the cancellation of a scheduled lecture at the University of Glasgow in 2021, after over 110 lecturers and faculty members signed a letter accusing Clark's work of promoting "discredited science" and perpetuating racist ideologies.

== Selected publications ==
- Genetically Capitalist? The Malthusian Era, Institutions and the Formation of Modern Preferences. UC Davis, 3 March 2007

=== Books ===
- A Farewell to Alms (2007), Princeton University Press. ISBN 0-69112135-4. A Malthusian look at economic history.
- The Son Also Rises (2014), Princeton University Press. ISBN 0-69116254-9. On why long-run social mobility is low.
- To Have and Have Not: The Determinants of Social Status in England, 1600–2026 (2026), Econ Journal Watch.
