= Hautcœur =

Hautcœur is a surname. Notable people with the surname include:

- Kévin Hautcœur, French middle-distance runner
- Pierre-Cyrille Hautcœur, French economist
- Yohan Hautcœur (born 1981), French footballer
