= Caitlin Rosenthal =

American historian

Caitlin C. Rosenthal is an American historian. She is an associate professor at the University of California, Berkeley. Her first book, Accounting for Slavery (2018), won the Francis B. Simkins Award from the Southern Historical Association in 2019, and the first monograph prize from the Economic History Society in 2020.

== Life ==
Caitlin Rosenthal studied at Harvard University before working for McKinsey & Company for three years. She returned to Harvard to pursue a PhD in history. There she was a finalist for the Nevins Prize in Economic History and winner of the Krooss Prize for the Best Dissertation in Business History.

Rosenthal was a Newcomen Postdoctoral Fellow at Harvard Business School before becoming an assistant professor of history at the University of California, Berkeley.

Accounting for Slavery was widely and favourably reviewed. Jeffrey Sklansky called it a "stunning study".

== Works ==
- Accounting for Slavery: Masters and Management. Cambridge, MA: Harvard University Press, 2018. ISBN 9780674972094
