= International Economic History Association =

- Abbreviation: IEHA
- Formation: 1960; 66 years ago
- Legal status: Active
- Location: Utrecht, Netherlands
- Fields: Economic history
- President: Anne McCants (Massachusetts Institute of Technology)
- Key people: Fernand Braudel
- Subsidiaries: Business History Conference, European Business History Association, European Historical Economics Society, International Social History Association
- Website: www.ieha-wehc.org

The International Economic History Association (IEHA) is an association of national, regional, and international organizations dedicated to the field of economic history, broadly defined. The IEHA includes 45 member organizations in 40 countries around the world. Headquartered in Utrecht, Netherlands, the IEHA promotes the study of and facilitates collaboration on a variety of projects, publications, and initiatives. While the IEHA has origins in European historiographies (especially those of France and the United Kingdom), it has since expanded its scope and membership to include economies and scholars outside of traditional areas of research.

The IEHA is best known for its triannual congress, the World Economic History Congress, an international and interdisciplinary event where over 1,000 economic historians convene each meeting to discuss trends in the field. Attendees of the conference include economists, historians, policymakers, heads of states, government ministers, and scholars of economic history.

== History ==
=== Founding ===
At the height of the Cold War in 1960, the IEHA was founded to unite scholars in Western Europe, the United States, and the Soviet Union. Among economists there were concerns of spurring and sustaining economic growth in many economic history departments in the United Kingdom and the United States. Similarly, Alexander Gerschenkron sought to build on Rostow's stages of economic growth with his research on economic backwardness. At the same time, the founding of the IEHA originally stemmed from the work of Fernand Braudel and Immanuel Wallerstein on economic growth in early modern Europe. Throughout the twentieth century, the IEHA gradually grew in size and the number of papers presented.

In 1968, the member organizations of the IEHA convened for the first meeting outside of Europe. The fourth meeting met in Bloomington, Indiana, United States.

By 2012, the organization expanded its global approach to the discipline by hosting its first conference outside of Europe. Around 750 attendees from 55 countries attended the World Economic History Congress in Stellenbosch, South Africa. European scholars at the conference were more interested in the North–south divide, thus facilitating the developing of African economic history as a whole. The conference was, in part, organized by the African Agenda, and boosted tourism to the local community. Academics have noted that the hosting of the Congress in Stellenbosch positioned the country to become one of the leading cenrtres of economic history on the African continent. The opening address, delivered by Minister of Finance Pravin Gordhan, recognized the economic and political potential that the conference had for the South African economy.

The first Congress to convene in Asia took place in Kyoto, Japan in August 2015. Presentations focused less on European economies and more on Latin American and Asian economies. The meeting thus presented an important moment, not just for economic history, but also for global history. The conference led to the publication of Jörg Baten's A History of the Global Economy: 1500 to the Present (2016) that, according to one reviewer "was commissioned by the International Economic History Association and the editor states that his aim is to organize a 'non-Eurocentric history' that presents 'economic history in a balanced way.'"

In recent years, the organization has returned its focus to present-day questions. In 2018, President Anne McCants spoke of the importance of understanding globalization: its origins, its effects on inequality, and the importance of big data. At the congress, held in Boston, Massachusetts French economist Thomas Piketty (École des hautes études en sciences sociales) and author of Capital in the Twenty-First Century described the World Economic History Congress as "one of the few places in the world where economists and historians talk to each other, and we truly need this interdisciplinary approach." The IEHA produces an annual bulletin of conferences and meetings for economic historians.

=== Leadership ===
Former presidents of the IEHA include:

- 1965–1968: Frederic Chapin Lane
- 1968–1974: Kristof Glamann
- 1974–1978: Peter Mathias
- 1978–1982: Zsigmond Pál Pach
- 1982–1986: Jean-François Bergier
- 1986–1990: Herman Van der Wee
- 1994–1998: Gabriel Tortella
- 1998–2002: Roberto Cortés Conde
- 2002–2006: Richard Sutch
- 2006–2009: Riitta Hjerppe
- 2012–2015: Grietjie Verhoef
- 2015–2018: Tetsuji Okazaki
- 2018–2021: Anne McCants

Former secretaries general of the IEHA include:

- 1998–2006: Jan Luiten van Zanden
- 2006–2012: Jörg Baten
- 2012–2015: Debin Ma
- 2018–2021: Jari Eloranta

== Organization ==
The IEHA comprises three bodies. The General Assembly includes one representative from each member organization. The executive committee oversees the execution of decisions made by the General Assembly, and the Local Organizing Committees are responsible for running the World Economic History Congress.

=== Membership ===
The IEHA comprises 45 member organizations, including the following.

IEHA Member Organizations
Organization	Location	Year founded	Website
Business History Conference	International	1954	
Cliometric Society	International	1960	
European Business History Association	International	1993	
European Historical Economics Society	International	1991	
International Maritime Economic History Association	International	1986	
International Social History Association	International	2005	
Asociacion Argentina de Historia Economica	Americas		
Associação Brasileira de Pesquisadores em História Econômica	Americas		
Canadian Network for Economic History/ Réseau canadien d'histoire économique	Americas		
Economic History Association	Americas	1940	
Asociación Uruguaya de Historia Económica	Americas		
Economic History Society of Australia and New Zealand	Asia Pacific		
Chinese Association for Economic History Studies, Chinese Academy of Social Sciences	Asia Pacific		
Indian Economic and Social History Association, Delhi School of Economics, University of Delhi	Asia Pacific	1963	
Economic and Social History Association of Israel (ESHAI)	Asia Pacific		
Korean Economic History Society, Chung-Ang University	Asia Pacific		
Economic History Society of Southern Africa	Africa		
Austrian Economic and Social Historians	Europe		
Belgische Vereniging voor sociale en economische geschiedenis, Ghent University	Europe		
Czech Economic History Society	Europe		
Danish Society for Economic and Social History	Europe		
Finnish Economic History Association	Europe		
Association Française d'Histoire Économique (AFHE)	Europe		
Gesellschaft für Sozial- und Wirtschaftsgeschichte	Europe	1961	
Gesellschaft für Unternehmensgeschichte e.V.	Europe	1976	
Greek Economic History Society	Europe		
Hungarian Economic History Association, Eötvös Loránd University	Europe		
Economic and Social History Society of Ireland	Europe	1970	
Società italiana degli storici dell'economia (SISE)	Europe		
N.W. Posthumus Instituut, Radboud Universiteit	Europe	2016	
Norwegian Member Organization	Europe		
Committee on Economic History, Polish Academy of Sciences	Europe		
Portuguese Association of Economic and Social History	Europe		
Commission on the History of the Economy and the History of Economic Thinking / Commission sur l'Histoire de l'Economie et l'Histoire de la Pensée Economique de l'Académie Roumaine	Europe		
National Committee of Historians, Russian Academy of Science	Europe		
Asociación Española de Historia Económica	Europe	1972	
Swedish Economic History Association, University of Gothenburg	Europe		
Schweizerische Gesellschaft für Wirtschafts- und Sozialgeschichte	Europe	1974	
Economic and Social History Foundation of Turkey	Europe		
Economic History Society (UK)	Europe	1926	

== World Economic History Congress ==
Every four years (and every three years since 2006), the IEHA hosts a World Economic History Congress (WEHC) on a particular topic in economic history. The meetings aim to bring together scholars who focus on to discuss present-day debates in the discipline. Past meetings include: The initial meetings were titled the International Conference and held in western European countries. The fifth meeting was held in Leningrad, Russia and, by the eighth meeting in Budapest, Hungary, the name was changed to the International Economic History Congress. The latter had over 850 economic historians from 88 countries participate. Its goal was to promote regulate debates in the international community of scholars. In 1994, the Eleventh International Economic History Congress in Milan, Italy had over 1,100 participants from more than 50 countries. The Congress has also been vital for the development of quantitative economic history, also known as cliometrics.

Past WEHC Meetings
Meeting	Theme	Location	Date	Website
First International Conference of Economic History		Stockholm, Sweden	1960	
Second International Conference of Economic History		Provence, France	1962	
Third International Conference of Economic History		Munich, Germany	1965	
Fourth International Conference of Economic History		Bloomington, Indiana, USA	1968	
Fifth International Conference of Economic History		Leningrad, Russia	1970	
Sixth International Congress of Economic History		Copenhagen, Denmark	1974	
Seventh International Congress of Economic History		Edinburgh, Scotland	1978	
Eighth International Economic History Congress		Budapest, Hungary	16–20 August 1982	
Ninth International Economic History Congress		Bern, Switzerland	1986	
Tenth International Economic History Congress		Leuven, Belgium	August 1990	
Eleventh International Economic History Congress		Milan, Italy	September 1994	
Twelfth International Economic History Congress		Madrid, Spain	August 1998	
XIII Congress of the International Economic History Association		Buenos Aires, Argentina	22–26 July 2002	
XIV International Economic History Congress		Helsinki, Finland	21–25 August 2006	
XV World Economic History Congress		Utrecht, Netherlands	3–7 August 2009	
XVI World Economic History Congress	"The Roots of Development"	Stellenbosch, South Africa	9–13 July 2012	
XVII World Economic History Congress	"Diversity in Development"	Kyoto, Japan	3–7 August 2015	
XVIII World Economic History Congress	"Waves of Globalization"	Boston, Massachusetts, USA	29 July – 3 August 2018	
XIX World Economic History Congress	"Resources"	Paris, France	25–30 July 2021	

== See also ==
- Economic History Association
- Economic History Society
