= Ephraim Lipson =

British economic historian

Ephraim Lipson, or E. Lipson (1 September 1888, in Sheffield – 22 April 1960) was a British economic historian.

The son of a Jewish furniture dealer, Lipson attended Sheffield Royal Grammar School followed by Trinity College, Cambridge, where he graduated with a First class degree in History.

He taught at Oxford University (as private tutor, independent researcher) Cambridge University (1921–1931), Boston University (1932–1933), University of California (1933–).

== Literary works ==
- editor of the "Economic History Review" (1921–1934) (with Richard Henry Tawney (1880–1962), Michael Moïssey Postan (1899–1981), H. J. Habbakuk, Economic History Society)
- The economic history of England, 3 Vols., 1915–1931
- Europe in the nineteenth century, 1916
- The history of the English woollen and worsted industries, 1921
- Increased production, 1921
- The inventions, 1934
- Europe, 1914–1939
- A planned economy and free enterprise, 1944
