= Daniel B. Klein =

American economist (born 1962)

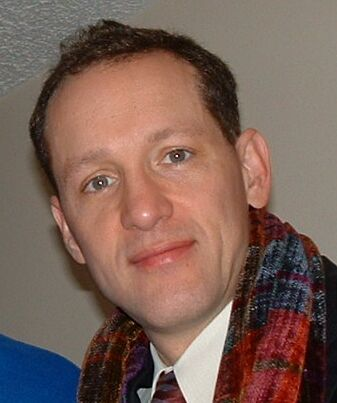
- Born: January 16, 1962 (age 64)

Academic background
- Education: New York University

Daniel Bruce Klein (born January 16, 1962) is an American professor of economics at George Mason University and an Associate Fellow of the Swedish Ratio Institute. Much of his research examines the works of Adam Smith, public policy questions, libertarian political philosophy, and the sociology of academia. He is the chief editor of Econ Journal Watch and director of the Adam Smith Program at George Mason University's Department of Economics.

Klein received his doctorate in economics from New York University in 1990. He was a visiting scholar at the City University in Stockholm and the Department of Economics, Stanford University.

Klein was born on January 16, 1962, to a non-religious Jewish family in Bergen County, New Jersey. His father was a pediatrician and his mother was an entrepreneur.
