= Roger Owen (historian) =

British historian (1935–2018)

- Born: 27 May 1935; London, England
- Died: 23 December 2018 (aged 83)
- Education: BA (1959), DPhil (1964)
- Occupations: Historian, A.J. Meyer Professor of Middle East History, Harvard University, 1993-
- Employer(s): Harvard, Director of Center for Middle Eastern Studies 1996-99
- Website: Harvard History Department - Faculty Emeriti

Edward Roger John Owen (27 May 1935 – 23 December 2018) was a British historian specializing in the modern Middle East, particularly the economic, social, and political history of Egypt from 1800 onward. His work also explored theories of imperialism and military occupations. Owen authored several influential books and held prominent academic positions, including professorships at the University of Oxford and Harvard University.

== Biography ==
Owen studied Politics, Philosophy and Economics (PPE) at Magdalen College, Oxford (1956–1959) before earning a DPhil in Economic History at St Antony's College, Oxford (1960–1964), under the supervision of Middle East scholar Albert Hourani. His thesis on Egyptian cotton production and 19th-century economic development was later published as a book.

In the 1960s, Owen became a key figure in the expansion of Middle Eastern studies at Oxford. Appointed to a post in Economic and Social History in 1964, he later served multiple terms as Director of St Antony's College Middle East Centre (1971–1974, 1980–1982, 1986–1988, 1991–1993). He later held the A.J. Meyer Professorship of Middle East History at Harvard University and directed its Center for Middle Eastern Studies (CMES).

Beyond academia, Owen contributed analysis to English-language Arab newspapers, including Al-Hayat and Al-Ahram. He was a member of the Middle East Studies Association of North America (MESA). Owen died on 23 December 2018.

== Awards and honors ==
- 2007: Doctorate in Humane Letters, American University in Cairo.
- 2010: "Award for Outstanding Contributions to Middle Eastern Studies" from the World Congress for Middle Eastern Studies (WOCMES).
- 2012: Giorgio Levi Della Vida Medal for Excellence in Islamic Studies, awarded by the UCLA Von Grunebaum Center.

== Selected works ==
- The Rise and Fall of Arab Presidents for Life. Harvard University Press (2012)
- Lord Cromer: Victorian Imperialist, Edwardian Proconsul (2004)
- State, Power and Politics in the Making of the Modern Middle East. Routledge, revised version (2004)
- A History of the Middle East Economies in the 20th Century, with Şevket Pamuk). I.B. Tauris (1999)
- The Middle East in the World Economy 1800–1914 (1981)
- Cotton and the Egyptian Economy, 1820–1914 (1969)
