= Cliometrica =

- Discipline: Economics, history
- Language: English
- Edited by: Claude Diebolt

Publication details
- History: 2007 - present
- Publisher: Springer
- Frequency: Triannual
- Impact factor: 2.167 (2020)

Standard abbreviations
- ISO 4: Cliometrica

Indexing
- ISSN: 1863-2505 (print); 1863-2513 (web)
- OCLC no.: 128596204

Links
- Journal homepage

Cliometrica is an academic journal about economic history. It follows the quantitative or formal approaches that have been called cliometrics or the new economic history, applied to any place and time. These formal approaches apply mathematical economic theory, model building, and statistical estimation.

The journal's first issues came out in 2007. It is published by Springer. Since its founding its publication director and managing editor has been Claude Diebolt.

Articles from the earliest issues can be downloaded through econpapers.repec.org. According to the Journal Citation Reports, the journal had a 2020 impact factor of 2.167.
