= Herman Van der Wee =

Belgian historian

- Born: Herman Frans Anna Van der Wee; 10 July 1928 (age 98); Lier, Belgium
- Spouse: Monique Verbreyt

Academic background
- Education: Catholic University of Leuven
- Thesis: The Growth of the Antwerp Market and the European Economy, fourteenth-sixteenth centuries. (1963)
- Doctoral advisor: Jan Van Houtte

Academic work
- Institutions: KU Leuven
- Doctoral students: Herman Daems

Herman Frans Anna baron Van der Wee (born 10 July 1928) is a Belgian economic historian. He was a full professor of social and economic history at the KU Leuven from 1969 to 1993. The academic output of Van der Wee spans economic history, the history of banking, financial history. He has performed research on the period from the Middle Ages to the present time. Geographically he has performed broad research as well, looking into Antwerp, Belgium, the Low Countries, Europe and the world.

== Career ==
Van der Wee was born on 10 July 1928 in Lier to Jos Van der Wee and Martha Planckaert. He began studying law at the Catholic University of Leuven in 1945. In 1949, he obtained a degree in philosophy. In 1950 he obtained his doctorate in law. He earned a further degree in social and political studies in 1951. In 1963, he obtained his doctorate in history with a thesis titled: "The Growth of the Antwerp Market and the European Economy, fourteenth-sixteenth centuries." His doctoral advisor was Jan Van Houtte.

In 1955 Van der Wee became a lecturer at the Catholic University of Leuven. From 1956 to 1963 Van der Wee worked for the factory of his father-in-law. Which allowed him to develop further insight into the practicalities of economic life. During this period the later politician Frank Vandenbroucke worked for two years as his assistant. In 1966, he became associate professor at the Catholic University of Leuven and the next year he obtained a position as professor. By 1969, he was named full professor social and economic history at the KU Leuven. Van der Wee was first employed primarily by the Faculty of Economics, but in 1977 this was expanded to include the Faculty of History. Van der Wee took up emeritus status in 1993. At the university, a fund was set up in his name to support the internationalization of multidisciplinary research projects. Van der Wee was President of the International Economic History Association between 1986 and 1990. From 2003 to 2004 Van der Wee was a research fellow at the Berlin Institute for Advanced Study where he led a project titled: "War and Monetary Policy. The National Bank of Belgium, the Brussels Bank of Issue and the Belgian Government, 1938-1948".

The academic interest of Van der Wee spans the period from the Middle Ages to the present time. Geographically he has studied Antwerp, Belgium, the Low Countries, Europe and the world. He has performed research in the areas of economic history, the history of banking, financial history.

== Honours and awards ==
Van der Wee was elected a member of the Royal Flemish Academy of Belgium for Science and the Arts in 1977. He was elected a foreign member of the Royal Netherlands Academy of Arts and Sciences in 1984. He was elected Corresponding Fellow of the British Academy in 1987. Van der Wee was one of the founding members of the Academia Europaea in 1988. In 1993 he was elected international honorary member of the American Academy of Arts and Sciences. In 1995 he became a Corresponding Fellow of the Royal Historical Society.

In 1992 Van der Wee won the Dr A. H. Heineken Prize for History, awarded by the Royal Netherlands Academy of Arts and Sciences, for his work in economic history. In 1994 he was knighted by King Albert II of Belgium with the title of baron. Van der Wee was recipient of the 1995 Golden Medal of Honor of the Flemish Parliament. He received an honorary degree from the University of Leicester in 1995.

== Personal life ==
Van der Wee married fellow history student Monique Verbreyt in 1954. Van der Wee has two children. Their daughter, Barbara, is an architect.
