= Karl Gunnar Persson =

- Born: 19 March 1943; Borås, Sweden
- Died: 14 September 2016 (aged 73); Siena, Italy

Academic background
- Education: Lund University

Academic work
- Discipline: Economic history
- Institutions: University of Copenhagen

Karl Gunnar Persson (19 March 1943 – 14 September 2016) was a Swedish economic historian whose contribution lies mainly in comparative European economic history.

== Life ==
Karl Gunnar Persson was born in Borås, Sweden, then a textile industry centre, and was educated as an economic historian at Lund University. In the 1960s and 1970s he mostly worked as a freelance journalist for the Swedish Radio, journals and newspapers. Persson's early academic work was in sociometrics investigating social mobility. He returned to economic history in the early 1980s.

He spent most of his career at the Department of Economics, University of Copenhagen, Denmark. He began as a Senior Lecturer in 1975 and later became Reader and finally Professor. He was appointed Professor Emeritus in 2013. He was a visiting scholar at various universities such as London School of Economics, European University Institute and Australian National University.

Karl Gunnar Persson had various administrative duties at his department over the years, including that of Deputy Head of department. He was the founding president of the European Historical Economics Society and one of the founding editors of the European Review of Economic History. He was a fellow of the Royal Danish Academy. He died in Siena, Italy on 14 September 2016.

== Work ==
=== Pre-Industrial Economic Growth ===
In the monograph Pre-Industrial Economic Growth he showed that the traditional Malthusian model did not have a single equilibrium characterized by subsistence income, but in fact a number of equilibria. If slow but persistent technological progress was admitted in a Malthus-Ricardo model, the equilibrium was characterized by positive population growth and income above subsistence. The level of per capita income and the rate of population growth was determined by the rate of technological progress given the rate of diminishing returns to labour.

The problem with estimating growth and income levels in pre-industrial societies is the lack of precise national income data. His approach is based on indirect estimates and relies on the possibility of inferring growth in per capita income by using data on changes in the occupational pattern and by implication the consumption pattern. The method uses Engel's law, the idea that households spend an increasing share of an income increase on non-food items and consequently less of the income increase on food. That will affect production and occupational distribution away from food production. An increase in the share of non-food producers in an economy reveals a per capita income increase. Using the method with relevant controls indicates pre-industrial income growth since medieval times of around 0.15–0.25 per cent per year.

=== Market integration ===
In the 1990s Persson was mainly working with the analysis of market integration arguing that markets which had stochastic output shocks, like grain production, experienced a stabilization of prices when previously segmented markets were integrated. The reason was that trade dampened the local shocks since over a large area shocks were independent geographically: grain could flow from surplus to deficient areas. This strand of research was summarized in his monograph Grain markets in Europe 1500–1900.

=== The law of one price ===
In subsequent work in this field Persson investigated the operation of the law of one price, the idea that price differentials for a homogeneous good traded between two locations must equal the transport costs between the two markets. He found that the quality and speed of information transmission determined the deviations from the ‘law of one price’ and that the introduction of the telegraph and the commercial press greatly reduced the deviations and increased the speed by which the ‘law of one price’ was restored after a shock in one market. He also measured the costs, in terms of dead weight loss, of poor market integration and the subsequent welfare gains of improvements in market performance.

=== An Economic History of Europe ===
Persson taught economic history for economics students during four decades and these lectures were reworked to a general textbook published as An Economic History of Europe. This treatise differs from traditional textbooks in economic history by not taking up a chronological narrative. Instead it is theme and problem-oriented with separate chapters on the international monetary order, inequality, institutions and growth, knowledge transmission and convergence, globalization and so forth.

=== Historical demography ===
Persson worked with historical demography from when he become an Emeritus professor. In particular he investigated the mechanisms of within-marriage fertility control before the advent of modern means of contraception. Persson challenged the conventional view in historical demography which tends to neglect within-marriage fertility control before the modern era. He was also involved in a project refining the method of productivity estimates by using occupational data.

== Selected bibliography ==
=== Monographs ===
- An Economic History of Europe, Knowledge, Institutions and Growth, 600 to the Present, Cambridge University Press 2010, 2nd revised and extended edition 2014. (Italian translation published by Apogeo 2011. )
- Grain markets in Europe 1500–1900, Integration and Deregulation, Cambridge University Press, 1999.
- Pre-Industrial Economic Growth, Social Organization and Technological Progress in Europe, Basil Blackwell, Oxford 1988.

=== Journal articles and chapters in books ===
- Markets and coercion in medieval Europe, chapter 9 in L. Neal and J.G. Williamson (eds), The Cambridge History of Capitalism, Vol. 1, Cambridge University Press, 2014.
- Market integration and convergence in the world wheat market, in T. Hatton et alia (eds), The New Comparative Economic History. Essays in Honor of Jeffrey G. Williamson, MIT Press 2007. With Giovanni Federico.
- Labour productivity in the Medieval Economy: The case of Tuscany and the Low Countries in B. Campbell and M. Overton (eds) Land, Labour and Livestock, Historical Studies in European Agricultural Productivity, Manchester University Press 1990.
- The gains from improved market efficiency: trade before and after the trans-Atlantic telegraph, European Review of Economic History, 14,3, 2010. With Mette Ejrnæs.
- Feeding the British. Convergence and efficiency in 19th century grain trade, Economic History Review, 61,1, 2008. With Mette Ejrnaes and Soren Rich.
- Mind the gap! Transport costs and price convergence in the 19th century Atlantic economy, European Review of Economic History, 8, 2 2004.
- Market integration and transport costs in France 1825-1903: A threshold error correction approach to the ‘law of one price’, Explorations in Economic History, 37, 2000. With Mette Ejrnaes.
