= Arat (name) =

Arat is a masculine given name and a surname. Notable people with the name are as follows:

== Surname ==
- Can Arat (born 1984), Turkish football player
- Hasan Arat (born 1959), Turkish businessman
- İbrahim Arat (born 1988), Turkish weightlifter
- Reşit Rahmeti Arat (1900–1964), Turkish philologist and writer
- Yeşim Arat (born 1955), Turkish political scientist and writer

== Given name ==
- Arat Dink (born 1979), Turkish journalist

== Fictional characters ==
- Arat (The Walking Dead), fictional character from the television series The Walking Dead
