= Richard H. Tilly =

American economic historian (1932–2023)

Richard Hugh Tilly (October 17, 1932 – February 18, 2023) was an American economic historian.

Born to a family of German descent in Chicago (as a younger brother to Charles), Richard Tilly studied history at the University of Wisconsin, Madison. From 1955 to 1957, he completed his military service largely in Germany, where he learned the language and, in 1960, married his wife Elisabeth, of Würzburg. After working for an insurance company, Tilly continued his studies, earning his Ph.D. in economics in 1964 from the University of Wisconsin, Madison, after two years of intensive research in Germany. After holding positions in Ann Arbor and Yale, he was appointed director of the newly founded Institute for Economic and Social History of the University of Münster in 1966, which he directed until his retirement in 1997.

Richard H. Tilly was an important advocate of the New Economic History developed in the late 1950s, which pursues economic history using economic theories and quantitative methods. Despite considerable resistance, Tilly paved the way for cliometrics in Germany. His research shaped an academic school — his students have occupied seven professorships in Germany.

Tilly's research focuses primarily on the themes of growth, financial institutions, and businesses; in addition, he made important contributions to various historical fields, including social and regional history, as well as the history of business cycles. Of his eight books, his classics Financial Institutions and Industrialization in the Rhineland, 1815-1870 (1966) and Kapital, Staat und sozialer Protest in der deutschen Industrialisierung (1980) deserve special mention. His concise historical overview of Germany's economic and social development Vom Zollverein zum Industriestaat: Die wirtschaftlich-soziale Entwicklung Deutschlands 1834 bis 1934 (1990) achieved great importance as a teaching text.

Tilly died on February 18, 2023, at the age of 90.

== Bibliography ==
- Financial Institutions and industrialization in the Rhineland 1815-1870. Madison: University of Wisconsin Press, 1966
- Charles Tilly / Louise Tilly / Richard H. Tilly: The Rebellious Century: 1830-1930, Harvard: Harvard University Press, 1975, ISBN 0674749553, 9780674749559
- Richard Tilly / Paul J. J. Welfens (Hrsg.): Economic Globalization, International Organizations and Crisis Management: Contemporary and Historical Perspectives on Growth, Impact and Evolution of Major Organizations in an Interdependent World, ISBN 3-540-65863-7
- Tilly, Richard (Spring 2010). "Banking crises in three countries, 1800–1933 : a historical and comparative perspective". Bulletin of the German Historical Institute. 46: 77–89.

== Links ==
- Pressemitteilung der Universität Münster
- Toni Pierenkemper: Richard H. Tilly (1997) (PDF; 1,6 MB)
- Verleihung des Helmut-Schmidt-Preises 2009 an Richard Hugh Tilly
- Literature by and about Richard H. Tilly in the German National Library catalogue
