= Marcel van der Linden =

Dutch labor historian (born 1952)

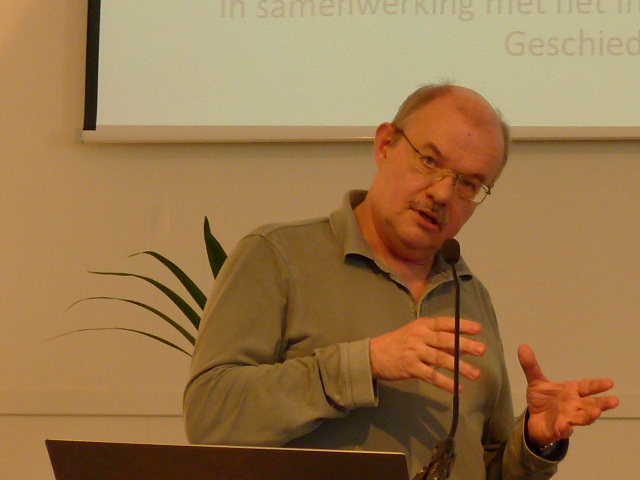
- Marcel van der Linden (2012)
- Born: 9 October 1952 (age 74)

Academic background
- Education: Utrecht University (MA); University of Amsterdam (PhD)
- Thesis: Het westers marxisme en de Sovjetunie: hoofdlijnen van structurele maatschappijkritiek (1917–1985) (1989)
- Doctoral advisor: Frits de Jong Edz.

Academic work
- Discipline: Social history
- Sub-discipline: History of social movements Labour history
- Institutions: University of Amsterdam; International Institute of Social History

Marcel Marius van der Linden (born 9 October 1952) is a Dutch sociologist and social historian.

== Biography ==
Van der Linden graduated with a master's degree in social sciences from Utrecht University in 1978. He was awarded a PhD in sociology for his thesis on Western Marxism and the Soviet Union: Outline of Structural Social Criticism (1917–1985), completed under the supervision of Frits de Jong Edz. at the University of Amsterdam, in September 1989.

He took up the position of an endowed professor in the history of social movements at the University of Amsterdam's Faculty of Social and Behavioral Sciences, created with a grant from the International Institute of Social History (IISG) foundation in September 1997. He was director of research at the IISG from 2001 to 2014, later becoming a senior researcher and a fellow.

Van der Linden was elected the first president of the International Social History Association, founded in Sydney in 2005 with current residency in Amsterdam. He served as president for three terms from 2005 to 2020. He is an editorial board member of the Marx-Engels-Gesamtausgabe project.

He is recognised in his field for his "global labour history" approach, which he has developed since the 1990s. The paradigm is seen by many labour scholars as a successor to traditional labour history and to the "new labour history" started in the 1960s by scholars like Eric Hobsbawm and E. P. Thompson.

Marcel van der Linden received an honorary doctorate from the University of Oslo in 2008. He is also the recipient of the René Kuczynski Prize (Berlin/Vienna 2009), and the Bochumer Historikerpreis (2014).

== Selected publications ==
As author

- Transnational Labour History: Explorations. Aldershot: Ashgate Publishing 2003, ISBN 0-7546-3085-4.
- Workers of the World: Essays toward a Global Labor History (Studies in global social history, 1). Brill Publishers, Leiden 2008, ISBN 978-90-04-16683-7.
- Western Marxism and the Soviet Union: A Survey of Critical Theories and Debates since 1917. Haymarket Books, Chicago 2009, ISBN 978-1-931859-69-1.
- The World Wide Web of Work: A History in the Making, London: UCL Press, 2023, ISBN 9781800084575.

As editor

- (with Madelaine Moore and Christoph Scherrer) The Elgar Companion to Decent Work and the Sustainable Development Goals, Cheltenham: Edward Elgar Publishing, 2025.
- (with Nicole Mayer-Ahuja) Power at Work: A Global Perspective on Control and Resistance, Berlin: De Gruyter, 2023.
- Cambridge History of Socialism, 2 vols., Cambridge: Cambridge University Press, 2022.
- (with Ravi Ahuja and Anna Sailer) The Distress Is Impossible to Convey: British and German Trade-Union Reports on Labour in India (1926–1928), Berlin: De Gruyter Oldenbourg, 2020.
- The Global History of Work: Critical Readings, 4 vols., London: Bloomsbury Academic, 2019, ISBN 9781474297318.
- (with Gerald Hubmann) Marx's Capital: An Unfinishable Project?, Leiden: Brill, 2018.
- (with Karin Hofmeester) Handbook: Global History of Work, Berlin: De Gruyter Oldenbourg, 2018, ISBN 9783110428353.
- (with Jürgen Kocka) Capitalism: The Reemergence of a Historical Concept. London: Bloomsbury Academic, 2016, ISBN 978-1-4742-7104-2.
- (with Magaly Rodríguez García) On Coerced Labor: Work and Compulsion after Chattel Slavery. Leiden: Brill, 2016, ISBN 9789004316379.
- Humanitarian Intervention and Changing Labor Relations: Long-Term Consequences of the Abolition of the Slave Trade. Leiden: Brill, 2011.
- (with Eva Himmelstoss) Labour History Beyond Borders: Concepts and Explorations/ Grenzenüberschreitende Arbeitergeschichte: Konzepte und Erkundungen. Leipzig: Akademische Verlagsanstalt, 2010.
- Grenzüberschreitende Arbeitergeschichte. Konzepte und Erkundungen. 45. Linzer Konferenz der „International Conference of Labour and Social History“, 10.–13. September 2009. Akademische VA, Leipzig 2010, ISBN 978-3-931982-68-3.
- (with Karl Heinz Roth) Über Marx hinaus. Arbeitsgeschichte und Arbeitsbegriff in der Konfrontation mit den globalen Arbeitsverhältnissen des 21. Jahrhunderts. Assoziation A, Berlin 2009, ISBN 978-3-935936-80-4.
- (with Angelika Ebbinghaus and Max Henninger) 1968 — A View of the Protest Movements 40 Years After, from a Global Perspective. Leipzig: Akademische Verlagsanstalt, 2009.
- (with Karl Heinz Roth and Max Henninger) Beyond Marx: Theorising the Global Labour Relations of the Twenty-First Century. Leiden: Brill, 2013.
- (with Prabhu P. Mohapatra) Labour Matters: Towards Global Histories: Studies in Honour of Sabyasachi Bhattacharya. New Delhi: Tulika Books, 2009.
- (with Jürgen Mittag and Berthold Unfried) Transnational Networks in the Twentieth Century: Ideas and Practices, Individuals and Organizations. Leipzig: Akademische Verlagsanstalt, 2008.
- (with Rana P. Behal) India's Labouring Poor: Historical Studies, c. 1600–c. 2000. New Delhi: Foundation Books, 2007.
- (with Rana P. Behal) Coolies, Capital and Colonialism: Studies in Indian Labour History, Cambridge: Cambridge University Press, 2006.
- (with Bert Altena) De-industrialization: Social, Cultural, and Political Aspects, Cambridge: Cambridge University Press, 2002, ISBN 0521532167.
- (with Richard Price) The Rise and Development of Collective Labour Law, Bern: Peter Lang, 2000, ISBN 9783906760360.
- (with Shahid Amin) "Peripheral" Labour? Studies in the History of Partial Proletarianization, Cambridge: Cambridge University Press, 1997, ISBN 0-511-56385-X.
- Social Security Mutualism: The Comparative History of Mutual Benefit Societies, Bern: Peter Lang, 1996, ISBN 3906755851.
- (with Jan Lucassen) Racism and the Labour Market: Historical Studies, Bern: Peter Lang, 1995, ISBN 3906753956.
- The End of Labour History?, Cambridge: Cambridge University Press, 1993.
- (with Gottfried Mergner) Kriegsbegeisterung und mentale Kriegsvorbereitung. Interdisziplinäre Studien (Beiträge zur politischen Wissenschaft. Bd. 61). Duncker & Humblot, Berlin 1991, ISBN 3-428-07130-1.
- (with Jürgen Rojahn) The Formation of Labour Movements 1870–1914: An International Perspective, 2 vols., Leiden: Brill, 1990, ISBN 9004092765.
- (with Wayne Thorpe) Revolutionary Syndicalism: An International Perspective, Aldershot: Scolar, 1990, ISBN 0859678156.
