= The Son Also Rises (book) =

2014 study of social mobility by Gregory Clark

- First edition
- Author: Gregory Clark
- Language: English
- Genre: Non-fiction
- Publisher: Princeton University Press
- Publication date: 2014
- Publication place: United States

The Son Also Rises is a 2014 non-fiction book on the study of social mobility by the economist Gregory Clark. It is based on historical estimates of social mobility in various countries made by Clark in collaboration with other researchers, though Clark takes pains to point out from the start the controversial conclusions he draws are his alone.

The book's title, like Clark's previous book A Farewell to Alms, is a pun on the title of an Ernest Hemingway novel, The Sun Also Rises. The third book in the trilogy, To Have and Have Not: The Determinants of Social Status in England, 1600–2026, was published in Econ Journal Watch in September 2026.

== Content ==
The book follows relatively successful and unsuccessful extended families through the centuries in England, the United States, Sweden, India, China, Taiwan, Japan, Korea, and Chile. Clark uses an innovative technique of following families by seeing whether or not rare surnames kept turning up in university enrollment records, registers of physicians, lists of members of parliament, and other similar contemporary historical registers. Clark finds that the persistence of high or low social status is greater than would be expected from the generally accepted correlations of income between parents and children, conflicting with virtually all measures of social mobility previously developed by other researchers, which Clark claims are flawed. According to Clark, social mobility proceeds at a similar rate in all of the societies and in all the periods of history studied – with the exceptions of social groups with higher endogamy (tendency to marry within the same group), who experience higher social persistence and therefore even lower social mobility.

The book attempts to explain the difference between Clark's estimates of social mobility rates and estimates by other researchers by noting that the effects measured by other researchers are based on only a few generations, and argues that Clark's posited hidden variable of inherited "underlying social competence" is swamped by chance variations in status from generation to generation – variations which Clark says are smoothed out in his longer-term study. This can be analogised to looking at a graph to understand the trend in the market price of a stock – a graph of a stock price over a one-day period may show large "zigzag" price swings and no apparent order, whereas a longer-term stock price graph, particularly if smoothed, may reveal a long-term trend for the price of the stock to increase or decrease.

From his finding that ethnically homogeneous societies, such as Japan and Korea, had similar rates of social mobility to ethnically diverse societies, such as the United States, Clark infers that racism may not be a significant factor affecting social mobility. From his finding that families who had many children were able to pass down their high social status just as well as families who had few children, Clark infers that simple inheritance of wealth cannot explain the persistence of high social status. From the referenced studies on the lack of correlation between the intelligence and adult family income of adopted children and their adoptive parents, Clark infers that family environment cannot explain the transmittal of social status from one generation to the next.

Clark's hypothesis is that the unexpectedly high persistence of social status in families—or, equivalently, of the unexpectedly low degree of social mobility—is that high-status people are more likely to have genes that are beneficial to them achieving high status, and are therefore more likely to pass such genes on to their children.
