= David R. Barker =

American author, academic and businessman (born 1961)

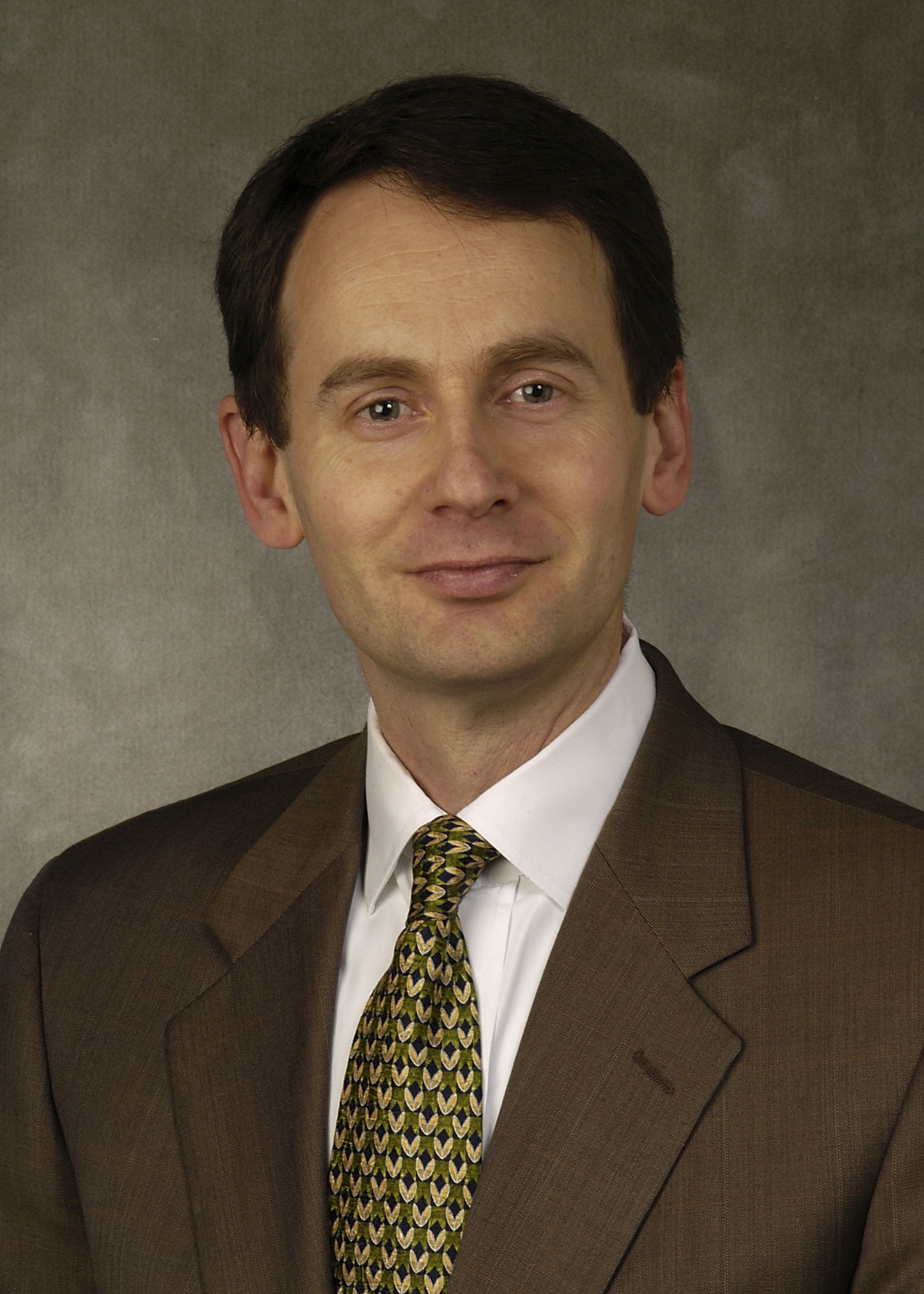
- Barker in 2008
- Born: May 7, 1961 (age 65)
- Education: University of California, Berkeley (BA); University of Chicago (MA, PhD)
- Occupation: Economist
- Title: Assistant Secretary for Postsecondary Education
- Term: 2025-2028
- Political party: Republican
- Spouse: Sarah Richardson

David R. Barker (born May 7, 1961) is an American author, academic, businessman, and politician, who began serving as the Assistant Secretary for the Department of Education in 2025. He is a former regent on the Board of Regents of the State of Iowa. A former economist for the Federal Reserve, Barker operates a real estate and finance company and is an Iowa Republican Party official. His academic research has been covered in print and broadcast media including Marketplace, As It Happens, The Economist, Time, and The New York Times. He has also written for U.S. News & World Report, The Christian Science Monitor, Collier's, and other publications. In 2020s, Barker published several articles in Econ Journal Watch (EJW) critiquing claims that higher temperatures will lower the rate of economic growth. He has been a co-editor of EJW since 2023.

== Early life and education ==
David Barker is a sixth-generation Iowan. He graduated from Iowa City West High School, then received a B.A. from the University of California at Berkeley, and an M.A. and Ph.D. in economics from the University of Chicago. He also attended the London School of Economics during his junior year of college.

== Academic career ==
After completing graduate school Barker worked as an economist at the Federal Reserve Bank of New York, helping to develop an early warning system for failing banks and methods to detect racial discrimination in mortgage lending, as well as conducting analysis of the capital requirements recommended by the Basel Committee on Banking Supervision.

After moving back to Iowa in 1994, Barker taught real estate and corporate finance at the University of Iowa as an adjunct professor. In 1997 he began teaching real estate to MBAs at the University of Chicago, which he continued to do until 2007. Barker also taught urban economics to undergraduates at the University of Chicago for several years. He has also taught at CIMBA in Paderno del Grappa, Italy.

Barker's academic research covers a variety of topics, including real estate markets, urban economics, terrorism insurance, health economics, business ethics, economic history, and libertarian political economy.

A 2009 paper on the effects of home ownership on children received widespread attention. It argued that previous academic work showing positive effects of home ownership on children's test scores and behavior failed in adequately controlling for factors other than home ownership and that when they are taken into account, home ownership has no economically or statistically-significant effects.

A paper analyzing the economics of the 1867 Alaska Purchase by the US from Russia argued that the financial returns to the federal government, tax revenue minus administrative costs, have been lower than alternative investments with similar risk.

Barker is the author of Welcome to Free America, a book set in 2057 as a guide to immigrants coming to the former United States after the collapse of government. It describes a difficult period of transition, but eventually, private companies take over functions previously performed by governments, such as security, dispute resolution, production of money and infrastructure, and national defense. The result is a society that is different, in many ways, from today. Barker stated that he does not advocate the elimination of government and that his book is only an attempt to explore where libertarian ideas might lead. According to him, the result could be considered by different people to be a utopia or a dystopia.

== Political activities ==
Barker was a delegate to the Republican National Convention in Cleveland in 2016. He is also a member of the State Central Committee of the Republican Party of Iowa and was appointed to the Executive Council of the Empower Rural Iowa Initiative by Governor Kim Reynolds.

In 2019, Barker was appointed to the Iowa Board of Regents by Reynolds, and reappointed in 2025. He was appointed by President Donald Trump to be Assistant Secretary for Postsecondary Education for the U.S. Department of Education. He resigned from his Regent position within the State of Iowa for his 2025-2031 term following his senate confirmation for the federal position.

== Business activities ==
Barker's companies own over 2,000 apartments in the Midwestern United States, along with office buildings, self-storage facilities, and convenience stores. Barker is also president of Barker Financial, which makes commercial loans. Barker has also constructed new apartments. In 2017 and 2018 Barker completed historic renovation projects in Marion, Iowa, Fort Madison, Iowa, and Fond du Lac, Wisconsin, and a $20.4 million purchase of apartments in Little Rock, Arkansas.
