= International Social History Association =

Learning society based in Amsterdam

The International Social History Association (ISHA) is a learned society based in Amsterdam. It was established in 2005 to promote research in social history and facilitate collaboration among social historians working in diverse academic cultures. It is currently the only academic organization in the field of social history that has the explicit aim of embracing the whole discipline and intends to connect social historians from all parts of the world.

The ISHA is based in Amsterdam. The president is Marcel van der Linden.

Apart from individuals, among others, the Australian Society for the Study of Labour History, the Canadian Committee on Labour History, and the Journal of Social History are also members of the ISHA.

In the first few years of its existence the ISHA sought to establish closer relationships with other international learned societies. Since 2006 the ISHA has been a full member of the International Economic History Association (IEHA). It is also affiliated with the International Committee of Historical Sciences (ICHS).
