= Jan Luiten van Zanden =

Dutch economic historian (born 1955)

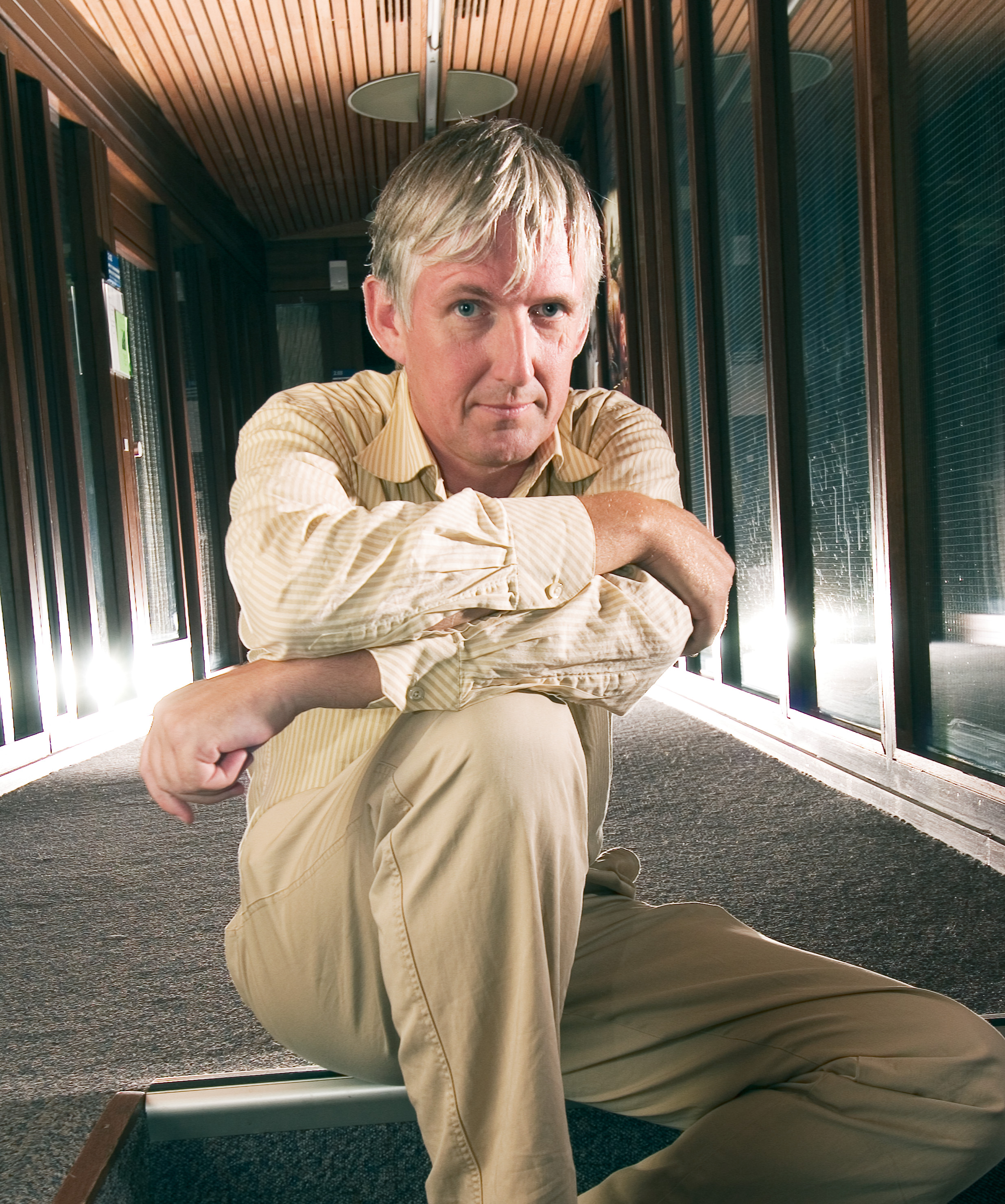
- Zanden in 2003
- Born: 15 November 1955 (age 70); IJmuiden, Netherlands

Academic work
- Discipline: Economic and social history
- Institutions: Utrecht University; VU University Amsterdam; University of Groningen; Stellenbosch University
- Website: www.uu.nl/medewerkers/jlvanzanden/0

Jan Luiten van Zanden (born 15 November 1955) is a Dutch economic historian and professor of Global Economic History at Utrecht University. He is a widely acknowledged specialist in Dutch, European and Global Economic History.

== Career ==
Van Zanden graduated cum laude in Economics from VU University Amsterdam in 1981. He received a doctorate from Wageningen University and Research Centre in 1985 with a thesis titled "The economic development of Dutch agriculture in the 19th century, 1800-1914."

After obtaining his PhD, he worked for two years at Erasmus University Rotterdam. From 1987 to 1993, he was a professor of economic and social history at VU University Amsterdam. In 1992, he was appointed professor of history at Urecht University and since 2009, is a faculty professor of economic and social history. In addition, in 2010, (for a period of five years) he was appointed honorary professor as the Maddison Chair at the University of Groningen. Since 2011, Van Zanden has been an honorary professor at Stellenbosch University.

He was particularly concerned with the economic history of the Netherlands in the nineteenth and twentieth centuries, but also with the economic history of Indonesia, with the history of Rabobank and that of Royal Dutch Shell.

== Awards and memberships ==
In 2003, he was awarded the Spinoza Prize by the Netherlands Organisation for Scientific Research, for "putting the entire Dutch economic history on the international map and for leading excellent research projects". In 1997, he became a member of the Royal Netherlands Academy of Arts and Sciences, where he was an academy professor from 2011 to 2016.

In 2009, he was the president of the organising committee of the fifteenth World Economic History Congress 2009 in Utrecht. In 2014, he was awarded the Pierson Penning Prize, and in 2016, he became a member of the Academia Europaea.

== Select publications ==
=== Books ===
Van Zanden has authored and co-authored several books including:

- with Maarten Prak: Nederland en het Poldermodel. Sociaal-economische geschiedenis van Nederland 1000-2000, Amsterdam: Bert Bakker, 2013.
- with Daan Marks: An Economic History of Indonesia 1800-2010, London: Routledge, 2012 (Translated to Indonesian)
- The Long Road to the Industrial Revolution. The European Economy in a Global Perspective, 1000-1800. Leiden, Brill Publishers, 2009.
- with Stephen Howarth, Joost Jonker, Keetie Sluyterman: A History of Royal Dutch Shell, 4 delen, Amsterdam, Boom Publishers/Oxford University Press, 2007
- with Tine de Moor: Vrouwen en de geboorte van het kapitalisme in West-Europa, Amsterdam, Boom Publishers, 2006.
- with A. van Riel: The Strictures of Inheritance. The Dutch Economy in the Nineteenth Century, Princeton University Press, 2004
  - Nederlandse uitgave: Nederland 1780-1914. Staat, instituties en economische ontwikkeling. Amsterdam, Balans, 2000.
- with J.-P. Smits, E. Horlings: Dutch GNP and its Components, 1800-1913, Groningen; Growth and Development Centre, 2000, Online
- with Keetie Sluyterman, Joost Dankers, Jos van der Linden: Het Coöperatieve Alternatief. Honderd Jaar Rabobank 1898-1998, Den Haag, 1998.
- with Lee Soltow: Income and Wealth Inequality in the Netherlands 1500-1990, Het Spinhuis; Amsterdam, 1998.
- The economic history of the Netherlands in the 20th century. Routledge; London, 1997
  - Nederlandse vertaling: Een klein land in de lange twintigste eeuw. Het Spectrum; Utrecht, 1997.
- with Wybren Verstegen: Groene Geschiedenis van Nederland, Utrecht: Het Spectrum, 1993.
- Arbeid tijdens het handelskapitalisme. Een nieuwe interpretatie van de opkomst en de achteruitgang van de economie van Holland, 1350-1850. Bergen, 1991.
  - Engelse vertaling: The Rise and Decline of Holland's economy. Merchant Capitalism and the Labour Market. Manchester University Press, 1993.
- with P. Boomgaard: Food crops and arable land, Java 1815-1942, Changing Economy in Indonesia, Band 10, Royal Tropical Institute; Amsterdam, 1990.
- with R. T. Griffiths: Economische geschiedenis van Nederland in de twintigste eeuw, Het Spectrum; Utrecht, 1989.
- De industrialisatie in Amsterdam 1825-1914, Octavo: Bergen, 1987.
- De economische ontwikkeling van de Nederlandse landbouw in de negentiende eeuw, 1800–1914. Wageningen, 1985 (proefschrift)
  - Engelse uitgave: The Transformation of European Agriculture in the 19th Century: The Case of the Netherlands, VU University Press, 1994.
