= The Economic History Review =

- Discipline: History, economics
- Language: English
- Edited by: Phillipp Schofield, Sara Horrell, Jaime Reis

Publication details
- History: 1927–present
- Publisher: Wiley-Blackwell on behalf of the Economic History Society (United Kingdom)
- Frequency: Quarterly
- Impact factor: 1.1 (2019)

Standard abbreviations
- ISO 4: Econ. Hist. Rev.

Indexing
- ISSN: 0013-0117 (print); 1468-0289 (web)
- LCCN: 29011002
- JSTOR: 00130117
- OCLC no.: 47075644

Links
- Web page at Economic History Society website; Web page at Wiley website

The Economic History Review is a peer-reviewed history journal published quarterly by Wiley-Blackwell on behalf of the Economic History Society. It was established in 1927 by Eileen Power and is currently edited by Sara Horrell, Jaime Reis and Patrick Wallis. Its first editors were E. Lipson and R. H. Tawney and other previous editors include M. M. Postan, H. J. Habbakuk, Max Hartwell (1960–1968), Christopher Dyer, Nicholas Crafts, John Hatcher, Richard Smith, Jane Humphries, Steve Hindle and Phillipp Schofield.

== Edition ==
The lead editors are John Turner, Giovanni Federico and Tirthankar Roy. The editorial board counts 21 other editors, including Jane Humphries and Debin Ma from the University of Oxford and Sara Horrell, Max-Stephan Schulze and Patrick Wallis from the London School of Economics. The journal has published 75 volumes usually composed of 4 annual issues.

== Ranking ==
It is considered one of the best economic history journals along with the Journal of Economic History, Explorations in Economic History and the European Review of Economic History. RePEc has ranked the journal 383rd out of 2982 economics journals. Its 2021 impact factor was 2.487.

== See also ==
- Agricultural History Review
- Economic history of the United Kingdom

== Notable articles ==
- "The Imperialism of Free Trade" by Ronald Robinson and John Gallagher, published in the August 1953 edition.
