= Thomas Ulen =

American law and economics professor (born 1946)

Thomas S. Ulen
- Born: November 4, 1946 (age 79)

Academic background
- Education: Stanford University (Ph.D.); Oxford University (M.A.); Dartmouth College (B.A.)

Academic work
- Discipline: Law and Economics
- School or tradition: Law and Economics
- Institutions: UIUC

Thomas Shahan Ulen is an American law and economics professor, currently serving as Swanlund Chair Emeritus at the University of Illinois at Urbana-Champaign (UIUC).

== Education ==
Tom Ulen studied at Dartmouth College, obtaining a Bachelor of Arts in 1968. After serving in the Peace Corps for two years, he returned to school, receiving a postgraduate degree (Master of Arts) from Oxford University in 1972. In 1979 he obtained a PhD from Stanford University.

== Research and publications ==
Professor Ulen currently holds one of the highest endowed chairs at UIUC, and serves as director of the Law School's Program in Law and Economics. He also holds positions at the UIUC's Department of Economics and at the Institute for Government and Public Affairs.

In 2007 Katholieke Universiteit Leuven presented Professor Ulen with an honorary doctorate (doctor honoris causa). He currently is a member of American Law and Economics Association, American Economic Association, American Bar Association (associate member).

A prolific writer, Ulen authored seven books (of which "Law and Economics" is a leading textbook), more than seventy articles and tens of other materials (book chapters, essays, reviews). He is considered a leader in his field: "Tom Ulen is one of the great pioneers of law and economics. He, along with William Landes, Mitch Polinsky, Al Klevorick, and Steve Shavell represent the first wave of PhD economists teaching in law schools and publishing in law reviews. [Tom] is also one of the great expositors of law and economics"
