= Aromatic-amino-acid transaminase =

Identifiers
- EC no.: 2.6.1.57
- CAS no.: 37332-38-0

Databases
- IntEnz: IntEnz view
- BRENDA: BRENDA entry
- ExPASy: NiceZyme view
- KEGG: KEGG entry
- MetaCyc: metabolic pathway
- PRIAM: profile
- PDB structures: RCSB PDB PDBe PDBsum
- Gene Ontology: AmiGO / QuickGO
Search
- PMC: articles
- PubMed: articles
- NCBI: proteins

An Aromatic-amino-acid transaminase (EC 2.6.1.57) is a pyridoxal phosphate-dependent enzyme that catalyzes the general chemical reaction

an aromatic amino acid + α-ketoglutaric acid $\rightleftharpoons$ an aromatic oxo acid + L-glutamate

The two substrates of this enzyme are an aromatic amino acid and α-ketoglutaric acid. Its products are the corresponding α-keto acid and L-glutamic acid.

For example, the enzyme characterised from Escherichia coli interconverts phenylalanine and phenylpyruvic acid:

phenylalanine
+
α-ketoglutaric acid
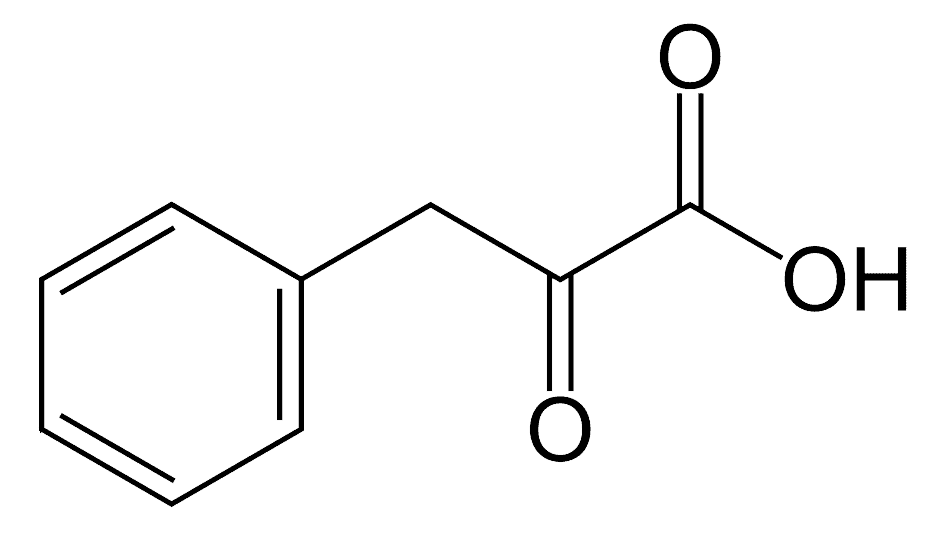
phenylpyruvic acid
+
L-glutamic acid

This enzyme is a transferase, specifically a transaminase, which transfer nitrogenous groups. The systematic name of this enzyme class is aromatic-amino-acid:2-oxoglutarate aminotransferase. Other names in common use include aromatic amino acid aminotransferase, aromatic aminotransferase, and ArAT. It participates in many metabolic pathways including methionine metabolism, tyrosine metabolism, phenylalanine metabolism, phenylalanine, tyrosine and tryptophan biosynthesis, novobiocin biosynthesis, and alkaloid biosynthesis.

== Structural studies ==
As of late 2007, 13 structures have been solved for this class of enzymes, with PDB accession codes 1AY4, 1AY5, 1AY8, 2AY1, 2AY2, 2AY3, 2AY4, 2AY5, 2AY6, 2AY7, 2AY8, 2AY9, and 3TAT.
