= Journal of Economic Growth =

- Discipline: Economics
- Language: English
- Edited by: Oded Galor

Publication details
- History: 1996 to present
- Publisher: Springer Science+Business Media (United States)
- Frequency: Quarterly

Standard abbreviations
- ISO 4: J. Econ. Growth

Indexing
- ISSN: 1381-4338 (print); 1573-7020 (web)

Links
- Journal homepage

The Journal of Economic Growth is a peer-reviewed academic journal covering research in economic growth and dynamic macroeconomics. It was established in 1996 and is published by Springer Science+Business Media. The journal deals with both theories and their empirics, and examines the entire array of subject areas in economic growth, including neoclassical and endogenous growth models, growth and income distribution, human capital, fertility, trade, development, migration, money, the political economy, endogenous technological change, overlapping-generations models, and economic fluctuations.

The Journal of Economic Growth is ranked #4 among all journals in the RePEc ranking. According to the Journal Citation Reports, it had a 2009 impact factor of 3.083, ranking it 11th out of 209 journals in the category "Economics". The editor in chief is Oded Galor (Brown University and Hebrew University).
