= Jaime Reis =

Portuguese composer (born 1983)

Jaime Reis (born December 1983) is a composer from Lisbon, Portugal whose music has been presented in Portugal, Poland, Turkey, Brazil, Singapore, Hong Kong, Taiwan, France, Austria, Ukraine and Belgium.

== Works ==
2018

Aera excipere

12 flutes 2018

Sândalo Prata

Flute and guitar 2017

Voces excipere

12 soloist voices 2017

Fluxus, pas trop haut dans le ciel

16 channels in a dome distribution. 2017

Fluxus, Dimensionless sound (B)

Flute and electronics 2017

Bartolomeu, o voador,

Piano and electronics - didactic piece 2017

Inverso Sangue: Cinábrio (III)

Violin, viola and cello 2017

Inverso Sangue: Granito (B) (II)

Saxophone, violin and cello 2017

Inverso Sangue: Granito (II)

Clarinet, violin and cello 2017

Inverso Sangue: Âmbar (I)

Clarinet 2016

A Omnisciência é um Colectivo - Part IV

Percussion and electronics 2016

Bartolomeu, o voador,

Children's choir, recitant and electronics 2016

Sangue Inverso: Obsidiana (III)

Flute, clarinet and piano 2016

Sangue Inverso: Magnetite (I)

Piano - didactic piece 2016

Sangue Inverso: Ametista (II)

Piano and flute 2015

Sangue Inverso: Ametista (B) (II)

Piano and recorder 2015

Sangue Inverso: Olho de Tigre (VI)

Piano, violin, viola and cello 2015

Fluxus, Drag

Cello, double bass and electronics 2015

Jeux de l’Espace

Electronics (8 + PLA) 2015

A Omnisciência é um Colectivo - Part III

Electronics and piano 2014

GS65

Viola solo 2012/2014

Fluxus, Dimensionless sound

Flute glissando headjoint and electronics 2013

Fluxus, Transitional Flow

Viola and electronics 2013

Fluxus, Lift

Electronics 2010/2011

A Anamnese das Constantes Ocultas

Ensemble and electronics (6 + PLA) 2009/2011

A Omnisciência é um Colectivo - Part II

Electronics and wind orchestra 2009

A Omnisciência é um Colectivo - Part I

Electronics 2008

Estudos de Densidades II

Ensemble - didactic piece 2007

Sinais no Tempo

Guitar and electronics 2006

Densidades Emergentes

Orchestra 2005

Reificação Espectral

Orchestra and electronics 2005

Density Study

Robot orchestra 2004

Improvisação sobre três poemas de Al Berto

Orchestra 2004

(Sobre o processo de) Replicação

2 flutes, 2 percussionists 2003/2004

Phonopolis

Electronics 2003

Síntese

Orchestra 2003

Lysozyme Synthesis

Piano 2002

Calmodulin Synthesis

5 percussionist 2001/2003

Estátua de Pessanha

Piano, bass flute and real-time video

== Papers ==
– Akademia Muzyczna Kraków, Três conferências sobre história da Música em Portugal, 2003
– “Breve história do desenvolvimento da tecnologia electrónica aplicada à composição musical”, 4º Encontro da Secção Portuguesa da AES (Audio Engineering Society), Universidade de Aveiro, June 2003
– Modelos matemáticos applicados à composição musical – Um meio ou um fim?, Escola Superior de Turismo e Telecomunicações de Seia, 2004
– “Biological models applied to musical composition”, Musical Thinking Today forum, 42. Internationale Ferienkurse für Neue Musik, Darmstadt, 2004
– Graz, Áustria | Hörfest | compositor convidado juntamente com o Miso Ensemble | estreia: Lysozyme Synthesis, 2005
– “Phonopolis” – apresentação da peça nas Listening Rooms da International Computer Music Conference (ICMC), Barcelona, 2005
– Festivais de Música Electroacústica como produtos de Turismo, June 2006, Escola Superior de Turismo e Telecomunicações de Seia
– International Summer School of Systematic Musicology, Gent, Belgium, 2006
– A Música Electrónica de Luciano Berio, March 2007, Conservatório de Música de Seia
– “Biological Models and Music Composition”, poster apresentado no congresso “Musica e Genética”, Bologna, Italy, May 2007
– Introdução à História da Música em Portugal, Biblioteca Municipal de Palmela, May 2007
– Model ASEM, Cultural Pillar, Beijing, China, 2008
– Stockhausen Courses, Kürten, Germany, 2009 – moderator of the Forum for Music Educators
– Helsinki University, ASEFUAN AGM, Helsinki, Finland, 2010
– participant, 15th ASEF University, Woosuk University, Wanju, Jeonbuk Province, South Korea, 2009
– Model ASEM, guest speaker – “On the Cultural Policies in Portugal”, Sciences Po, Le Havre, France, 2009
– Gulbenkian Foundation – Introdução à obra Luiz Vaz 73, de Jorge Peixinho e Ernesto de Sousa – Lisbon, CAM, 2009
– ASEF's Rapporteur – COP15 – “Arts, Culture and Sustainability: Building Synergies between Asia and Europe” and “Culture | Futures: The Transition to an Ecological Age 2050,” Denmark, December 2009
– Keio University, ASEFUAN AGM, Tokyo, Japan, 2010
– UNICAMP – Composition Lecture, Brazil, September 2010
– Salvador na Bahia, Brazil – UFBA – Composition Lectures – Guest composer at III FIMC – Festival Internacional de Música Contemporânea (along with composer Paulo Chagas, conductor Pedro Pinto Figueiredo and guitar player Pedro Rodrigues), September 2010
– Encontro Internacional de Música e Arte Sonora – EIMAS – “De Entretecimento a Omnisciência”, UFRJ /UNIRIO – Juiz de Fora e Rio de Janeiro, September 2010
– Culturgest, Lisboa – “Luís Vaz 73, uma possível reconstituição ou a reconstituição possível?”, Jorge Peixinho – Mémoires... Miroirs, October, 2010
– “Música Electroacústica e Espacialização”, Sociedade Portuguesa de Acústica, Laboratório Nacional de Engenharia Civil – November 2010
