= Agricultural History Review =

- Discipline: History
- Language: English

Publication details
- History: 1953–present
- Publisher: British Agricultural History Society (United Kingdom)
- Frequency: Quarterly

Standard abbreviations
- ISO 4: Agric. Hist. Rev.

Indexing
- ISSN: 0002-1490
- JSTOR: agrihistrev
- OCLC no.: 1478540

Links
- Journal homepage; IngentaConnect

The Agricultural History Review. A Journal of Agricultural and Rural History is a peer-reviewed academic journal published quarterly by the British Agricultural History Society. It was established in 1953.

== See also ==
- Agriculture in the United Kingdom § History
- The Economic History Review
- Economic history of the United Kingdom
- British Agricultural Revolution
- Historiography of the United Kingdom
- History of Agriculture
