= Explorations in Economic History =

- Discipline: Economic history
- Language: English
- Edited by: W.J. Collins, H.J. Voth

Publication details
- Former name: Explorations in Entrepreneurial History
- History: 1949-1958, 1963-present
- Publisher: Elsevier
- Frequency: Quarterly
- Impact factor: 2.259 (2020)

Standard abbreviations
- ISO 4: Explor. Econ. Hist.

Indexing
- ISSN: 0014-4983
- LCCN: 75613248
- OCLC no.: 1568657
- Explorations in Entrepreneurial History
- ISSN: 0884-5425

Links
- Journal homepage; Online access

Explorations in Economic History is a peer-reviewed academic journal of quantitative economic history. It follows the quantitative or formal approaches that have been called cliometrics or the new economic history, applied to any place and time. These formal approaches apply mathematical economic theory, model building, and statistical estimation. It is published by Elsevier and the editors-in-chief are W.J. Collins (Vanderbilt University) and H.J. Voth (University of Zurich).

== History ==
The journal was established in 1949 as Explorations in Entrepreneurial History, which was published until 1958. A second series was published starting in 1963, with volume numbering restarting at 1, and the journal obtained its current name in 1969.

== Abstracting and indexing ==
The journal is abstracted and indexed in:

- AGRICOLA
- America: History and Life
- Current Contents/Social & Behavioral Sciences
- Geographical Abstracts
- RePEc
- Social Sciences Citation Index

According to the Journal Citation Reports, the journal has a 2020 impact factor of 2.259.

It is considered one of the best economic history journals along with the Journal of Economic History, Economic History Review and the European Review of Economic History.
