= Yeşim Arat =

Turkish political scientist and author

- Born: September 5, 1955 (age 71)
- Occupations: Political scientist, author

Academic background
- Education: Yale University (BA, MA, PhD)
- Thesis: Women in Turkish Politics (1983)
- Doctoral advisor: John Waterbury

Academic work
- Discipline: Gender politics, Turkish politics, women's movements
- Institutions: Boğaziçi University

Yeşim Arat (born September 5, 1955), is a Turkish political scientist and author specialized in gender politics, Turkish politics, women in Turkish politics, and women's movements in Turkey. She is a professor in the department of political science and international relations at Boğaziçi University.

== Early life and education ==
Yeşim Arat was born on September 5, 1955. She completed a B.A. in political science and economics at Yale University in 1978. Arat earned a M.A. (1980) and Ph.D. (1983) in the department of politics at Princeton University. Her dissertation was titled, Women in Turkish Politics. Arat's doctoral advisor was John Waterbury.

== Career ==
Arat joined the faculty at Boğaziçi University in 1983 as an assistant professor in the department of political science and international relations. She was promoted to associate professor in 1990 and professor in May 1996. Arat served as the vice rector for academic affairs (provost) from August 2008 to August 2012. She was chair of the department January 1997 to January 1999, April 2013 to September 2014, and September 2015 to July 2017.

She researches gender politics, Turkish politics, women in Turkish politics, and women's movements in Turkey.

== Awards and honors ==
Arat was elected member of The Science Academy Society of Turkey in 2012.

== Selected works ==
=== Books ===
- Arat, Yeşim (1989). The Patriarchal Paradox: Women Politicians in Turkey. Fairleigh Dickinson University Press. ISBN 0-8386-3347-1. OCLC 18961303.
- Laslett, Barbara; Brenner, Johanna; Arat, Yeşim, eds. (1995). Rethinking the Political: Gender, Resistance, and the State. Chicago: University of Chicago Press. ISBN 0-226-07397-1. OCLC 32167858.
- Arat, Yeşim (1999). Political Islam and Women's Associations. İstanbul: Turkish Economic and Social Studies Foundation. ISBN 975-8112-10-4. OCLC 68747695.
- Arat, Yeşim (2005). Rethinking Islam and Liberal Democracy: Islamist Women in Turkish Politics. State University of New York Press. ISBN 0-7914-6465-2. OCLC 238858118.
- Altınay, Ayşe Gül; Arat, Yeşim (2008). Türkiye'de kadına yönelik şiddet [Violence Against Women in Turkey]. Istanbul: Punto Baskı Çözümleri. ISBN 978-975-01103-2-0. OCLC 218946209.
- Altınay, Ayşe Gül; Arat, Yeşim (2009). Violence Against Women in Turkey: A Nationwide Survey. Translated by Spangler, Amy. İstanbul: Punto. ISBN 978-975-01103-7-5. OCLC 475481384.
- Arat, Yeşim; Pamuk, Şevket (2019). Turkey Between Democracy and Authoritarianism. Cambridge University Press. ISBN 978-0-521-13850-5. OCLC 1134665742.
