= Pierre-Cyrille Hautcœur =

French economist

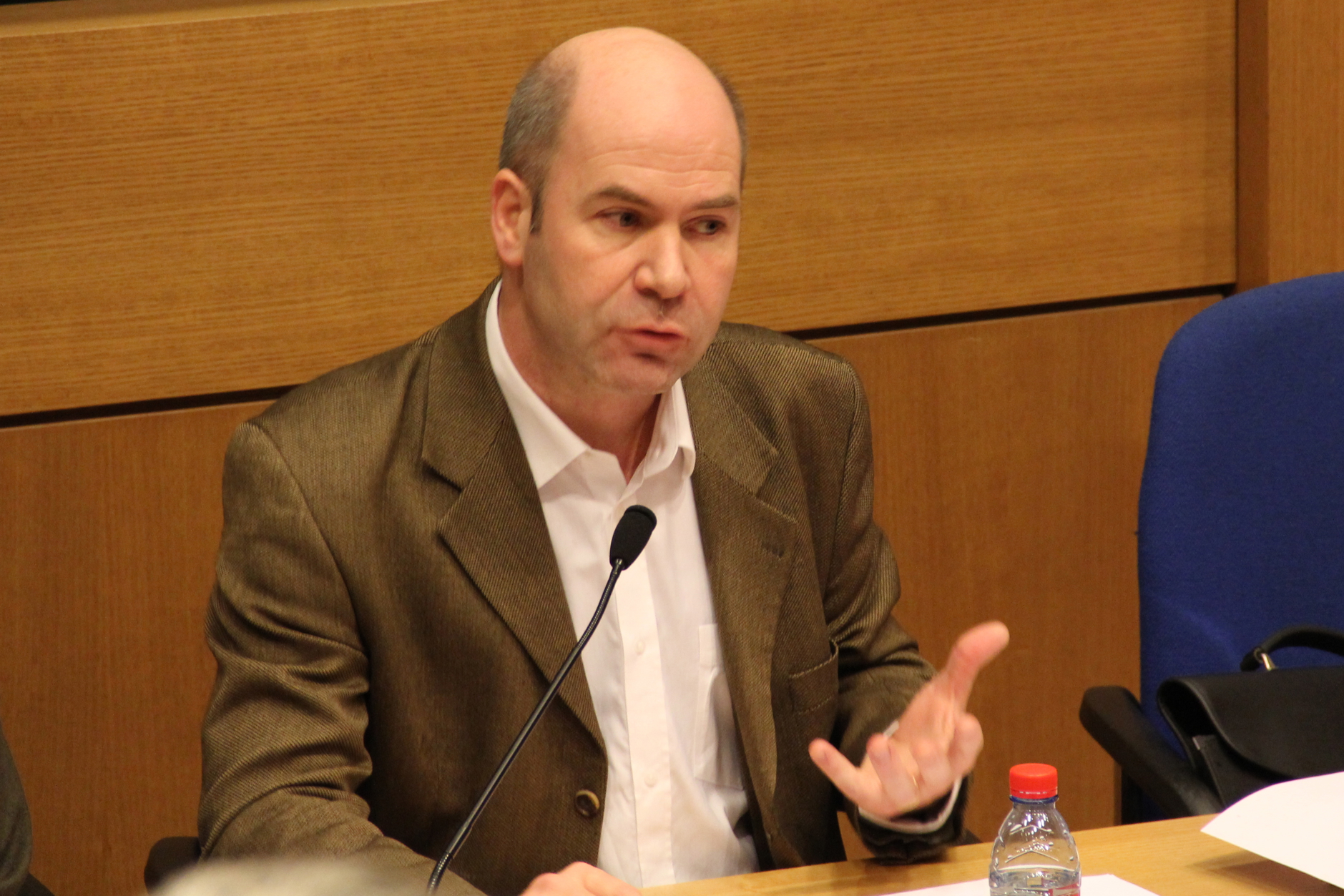
- Debate of the candidates for the presidency of the EHESS, Pierre-Cyrille Hautcœur, amphitheater, 2012.
- Born: 9 October 1964 (age 61); Paris, France
- Education: Lycée Henri-IV
- Alma mater: École normale supérieure
- Occupations: Economist; Academic administrator

Pierre-Cyrille Hautcœur (born 9 October 1964) is a French economist and Professor at the Paris School of Economics. Hautcoeurs research interests include money, credit and long-run finance. His research was awarded the Best Young French Economist Award in 2003.
