= The Journal of Economic History =

Academic journal of economic history

- Discipline: Economics, Economic history
- Language: English
- Edited by: Ann Carlos, William Collins

Publication details
- History: 1941–present
- Publisher: Cambridge University Press on behalf of the Economic History Association (United States)
- Frequency: Quarterly
- Impact factor: 1.683 (2018)

Standard abbreviations
- ISO 4: J. Econ. Hist.

Indexing
- ISSN: 0022-0507 (print); 1471-6372 (web)
- LCCN: 43006024
- JSTOR: 00220507
- OCLC no.: 1782353

Links
- Journal homepage; Online access; Online archive

The Journal of Economic History is an academic journal of economic history which has been published since 1941. Many of its articles are quantitative, often following the formal approaches that have been called cliometrics or the new economic history to make statistical estimates.

The journal is published on behalf of the Economic History Association by Cambridge University Press. Its editors are Ann Carlos at the University of Colorado and William Collins at Vanderbilt University.

It is considered one of the best economic history journals along with the European Review of Economic History, Explorations in Economic History and the Economic History Review. Its 2016 impact factor is 1.101.
