= Econ Journal Watch =

- Discipline: Economics
- Language: English
- Edited by: Daniel B. Klein

Publication details
- History: 2004–present
- Publisher: Fraser Institute
- Frequency: Semiannual
- Open access: Yes
- Impact factor: 0.6 (2024)

Standard abbreviations
- ISO 4: Econ J. Watch

Indexing
- ISSN: 1933-527X
- LCCN: 2006215193
- OCLC no.: 55659121

Links
- Journal homepage; Online access

Econ Journal Watch (EJW) is a semiannual peer-reviewed electronic journal established in 2004. It is published by the Fraser Institute. According its website, the journal publishes comments on articles appearing in other economics journals, essays, reflections, investigations, and classic critiques. As of 2017, the Journal maintained a podcast, voiced by Lawrence H. White.

As of 2011, the editor-in-chief was Daniel B. Klein, a libertarian economist and professor at George Mason University. In 2018, the managing editor was Jason Briggeman. As of 2022, the Fraser Institute claimed nine Nobel laureates had been on the Journal's advisory council.

The journal welcomes submissions of comments on articles that appear in economics journals as well as essays, reflections, and investigations that speak to the nature and character of economics research and professional economists. EJW publishes critical commentaries and "watches the journals for inappropriate assumptions, weak chains of argument, phony claims of relevance, omissions of pertinent truths, and irreplicability".

== Notable articles ==
- A 2010 study by Zeljka Buturovic and Klein published in Econ Journal Watch purported to show that conservatives and libertarians were better informed than liberals about economics. After receiving criticism, the authors adjusted their research questions in a new study, and published its different findings in 2011. Jonathan Chait of The New Republic, who had called the 2010 study "hackery" and "obviously designed to portray conservatives as better informed", offered the authors praise in 2011 for the revisions.
- A study published in Econ Journal Watch in 2016 said that American university professors were much more likely to be Democrats than Republicans.
- A 2018 article by Alex Young documented that between the 2015 working paper version and the 2017 published version of a paper authored by Andrew Bird and Stephen Karolyi, the numbers in all 11 tables stayed exactly the same, even though the description of the specifications changed. The criticized article was subsequently retracted.
- A 2020 article by Justin Pickett analyzed both quantitative and qualitative data about what happened regarding retracted articles by the criminologist Eric Stewart and coauthors and suggested that "the five articles were likely fraudulent, several coauthors acted with negligence bordering on complicity after learning about the data irregularities, and the editors violated the ethical standards advanced by the Committee on Publication Ethics". Stewart was subsequently terminated from Florida State University.
- A 2022 article by Phillip Magness and Amelia Janaskie documented evidence of quotation editing and misrepresentation of original sources in an article about the economist Ludwig von Mises by historian Quinn Slobodian.
- In 2020s, David Barker published several articles critiquing claims that higher temperatures will lower the rate of economic growth. One of them documented that a paper by Riccardo Colacito, Bridget Hoffman, and Toan Phan claimed that higher temperatures decrease the rate of economic growth by regressing annual average state GDP growth on seasonal temperatures but did not test the significance of the sum of the seasonal coefficients (the cumulative effect over the year), which turned out to be insignificant. As of 2025, none of the commented-on authors of the critiqued articles have responded.

== Abstracting and indexing ==
The journal is abstracted and indexed in the Social Sciences Citation Index, Current Contents/Social & Behavioral Sciences, EconLit, Journal of Economic Literature, and Research Papers in Economics. According to the Journal Citation Reports, the journal has a 2024 impact factor of 0.6.

== See also ==
- List of economics journals
