= Cliometrics =

Application of econometrics and other formal methods to the study of history

Cliometrics (/ˌklaɪ.oʊəˈmɛt.rɪks/, also /ˌkliːoʊˈmɛt.rɪks/), sometimes called 'new economic history' or 'econometric history', is the systematic application of economic theory, econometric techniques, and other formal or mathematical methods to the study of history (especially social and economic history). It is a quantitative approach to economic history (as opposed to qualitative or ethnographic).

There has been a revival in 'new economic history' since the late 1990s.

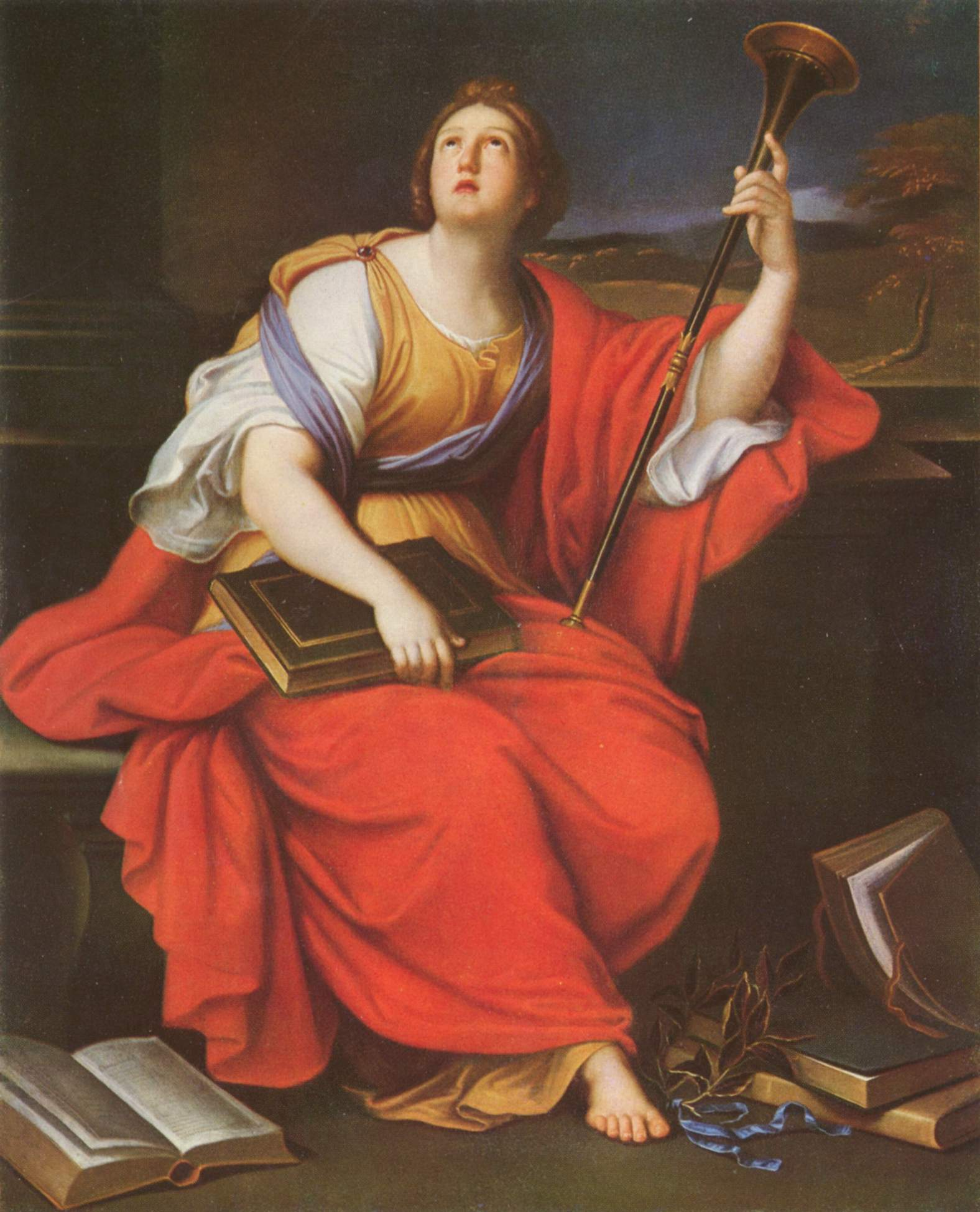
Clio by Pierre Mignard, oil on canvas, 1689

== History ==
The new economic history originated in 1958 with The Economics of Slavery in the Antebellum South by American economists Alfred H. Conrad and John R. Meyer. The book caused much controversy with its claim, based on statistical data, that slavery would not have ended in the absence of the U.S. Civil War, as the practice was economically efficient and highly profitable for slaveowners.

The term cliometrics—which derives from Clio, the name of the muse of history—was originally coined by mathematical economist Stanley Reiter in 1960. Cliometrics became better known when Douglass North and William Parker became the editors of the Journal of Economic History in 1960. The Cliometrics Meetings also began to be held around this time at Purdue University and are still held annually in different locations. Bold text North, a professor at Washington University in St. Louis, would go on to win the Nobel Memorial Prize in Economic Sciences in October 1993 along with Robert William Fogel, himself often described as the father of modern econometric history and Neo-historicals. The two were honoured "for having renewed research in economic history;" the Academy noted that "they were pioneers in the branch of economic history that has been called the 'new economic history,' or cliometrics." Fogel and North received the prize for turning the theoretical and statistical tools of modern economics on the historical past: on subjects ranging from slavery and railroads to ocean shipping and property rights. North was heralded as a pioneer in the "new" institutional history. In the Nobel announcement, specific mention was made of a 1968 paper on ocean shipping, in which North showed that organizational changes played a greater role in increasing productivity than did technological change. Fogel is especially noted for using careful empirical work to overturn conventional wisdom.

With that being said, the new economic history revolution is thought to have begun in the mid-1960s, where areas of key interest included transportation history, slavery, and agriculture. The discipline was resisted as many incumbent economic historians were either historians or economists who had very little connection to economic modeling or statistical techniques. According to cliometric economist Claudia Goldin, the success of the cliometric revolution had as an unintended consequence the disappearance of economic historians from history departments. As economic historians started using the same tools as economists, they started to seem more like other economists. In Goldin's words, "the new economic historians extinguished the other side." The other side nearly disappeared altogether, with only a few remaining in history departments and business schools. However, some new economic historians did, in fact, begin research around this time, among them were Kemmerer and Larry Neal (a student of Albert Fishlow, a leader of the cliometric revolution) from Illinois, Paul Uselding from Johns Hopkins, Jeremy Atack from Indiana, and Thomas Ulen from Stanford.

Cliometrics was introduced in the 1970s to Germany by Richard H. Tilly, who had been educated in the US. The Cliometric Society, a group to encourage and further the study of cliometrics, was founded in 1983.

There has been a revival in 'new economic history' since the late 1990s. The number of papers on economic history published in the top economics journals has increased in the last decades, comprising 6.6% of articles in the American Economic Review and 10.8% of articles in the Quarterly Journal of Economics for the period 2004-2014. Today, cliometric approaches are standard in several journals, including the Journal of Economic History, Explorations in Economic History, the European Review of Economic History, and Cliometrica.

== Critics ==
Cliometrics has had sharp critics. Francesco Boldizzoni summarized a common critique by arguing that cliometrics is based on the false assumption that the laws of neo-classical economics always apply to human activity. He considers that those laws are based on rational choice and maximization as they operate in well-developed markets and do not apply to economies other than those of the capitalist West in the modern era. Instead, Boldizzoni argues that the workings of economies are determined by social, political, and cultural conditions specific to each society and time period.

On the other hand, Claude Diebolt (2016) argued that cliometrics is mature and well accepted by scholars as an "indispensable tool" in economic history. He believes that most scholars agree that economic theory combined with new data as well as historical and statistical methods are necessary to formulate problems precisely, to draw conclusions from postulates, and to gain insight into complex processes so as to close the gap between Geisteswissenschaften and Naturwissenschaften: to move from the historical verstehen (understanding) side to the economic erklären (explaining) side or, much better, mixing both approaches for the achievement of a unified approach of the social sciences. At the applied level, cliometrics is accepted to measure variables and estimate parameters.

Joseph T. Salerno criticizes Cliometrics from the perspective of the Austrian school of economics, defending instead the methods of Ludwig von Mises. In his Introduction to Murray N. Rothbard's A History of Money and Banking in the United States, Salerno writes that, "in Rothbard’s view, economic laws can be relied upon in interpreting these non-repeatable historical events because the validity of these laws—or, better yet, their truth—can be established with certainty by praxeology, a science based on the universal experience of human action that is logically anterior to the experience of particular historical episodes... [thus] economic theory is an a priori science. In sharp contrast, the new [cliometric] economic historians view history as a laboratory in which economic theory is continually being tested... In general, the question of 'Cui bono?'—or 'Who benefits?'—from changes in policies and institutions receives very little attention in the cliometric literature, because the evidence that one needs to answer it, bearing as it does on human motives, is essentially subjective and devoid of a measurable or even quantifiable dimension."

== Distinguishing cliometrics and cliodynamics ==
Cliometrics and cliodynamics share the scientific ambition of using quantitative tools and historical data to test general historical principles. Both fields endeavor to gather large amounts of historical data across big samples. However, the two fields also differ in several ways.

Cliodynamics maintains a close relationship with the natural sciences, often employing dominant methods from the natural sciences such as differential-equation models, power-law relations, and agent-based models. Evolutionary game theory and social network analysis are also frequently employed by cliodynamicists, but less often by cliometricians. Cliodynamicists also tend to include factors associated with ecological context and biological determinants in their models.

== See also ==
- Critical juncture theory
- Economic history
- Quantitative history
- Cliodynamics
- Structural-demographic theory
- Anthropometric history
