= Economic History Society =

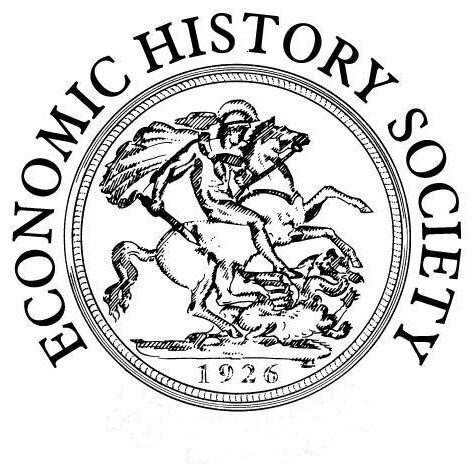
- Formation: 1926
- President: Professor Patrick Wallis
Website
ehs.org.uk
Presidents 1926–2026

The Economic History Society (EHS) is a learned society and academic charity that was established at the London School of Economics in 1926 to support the research and teaching of economic history in the United Kingdom and internationally. It provides funding to support research and students in economic history, particularly by funding postdoctoral fellowships in partnership with the Institute of Historical Research. The society also acts as a pressure group working to influence government policy in the interests of history and economic affairs, alongside other societies and professional bodies with similar interests. In addition, the Society regularly liaises with funding bodies such as Higher Education Funding Council for England, the Arts and Humanities Research Council, and the Economic and Social Research Council.

== History ==
The Economic History Society was established at a general meeting held at the London School of Economics on 14 July 1926. R. H. Tawney took the chair and, after the resolution to form the society had been carried unanimously, the meeting discussed the constitution and aims of the society and proceeded to elect its first officers, with Sir William Ashley as the first President. The publication of The Economic History Review was also discussed and Tawney and Lipson were appointed as joint editors.

== Aims ==
The objects of the Economic History Society as stated in its Constitution, are:

- Promote the study of economic and social history
- Establish closer relations between students and teachers of economic and social history
- To publish the Economic History Review
- To publish and sponsor other publications in the fields of economic and social history
- To hold an annual conference and to hold or participate in any other conference or meeting as may be deemed expedient in accordance with (a) and (b) above
- To co-operate with other organisations having kindred purposes

Along with the Economic & Business History Society, the Business History Conference, the Cliometric Society, the EHS sponsors EH.net, which provides resources and distributes communications to scholars in economic history and related fields.

== The Economic History Review ==
The EHS publishes a quarterly peer-reviewed journal, The Economic History Review. The journal was established in 1927 and publishes scholarly research articles and book reviews in the fields of economic and social history.

== See also ==
- Historiography of the United Kingdom
