= European Review of Economic History =

- Discipline: Economic History, Cliometrics
- Language: English
- Edited by: Kerstin Enflo, Joan R. Rosés and Christopher M. Meissner

Publication details
- History: 1997–present
- Publisher: Oxford University Press (UK)
- Frequency: Triannual
- Impact factor: 1.706 (2021)

Standard abbreviations
- ISO 4: Eur. Rev. Econ. Hist.

Indexing
- ISSN: 1361-4916 (print); 1474-0044 (web)

Links
- Journal homepage

The European Review of Economic History is an international peer-reviewed academic journal published three times per year. It was formerly edited by Cambridge University Press and is currently edited by Oxford University Press. It is edited in association with the European Historical Economics Society.

The journal intends to be a publishing outlet for research into European, comparative and world economic history, through the medium of research articles, shorter note and comments, debates, surveys and review articles.

The current editors are Kerstin Enflo (Lund University), Joan R. Rosés (London School of Economics) and Christopher M. Meissner (UC Davis).

== Ranking and reputation ==
It is considered one of the best economic history journals along with the Journal of Economic History, Explorations in Economic History and the Economic History Review. In 2022, its impact factor was 1.706.
