= Auxology =

Study of all aspects of human physical growth

Auxology (from Greek αὔξω, auxō, or αὐξάνω, auxanō 'grow'; and -λογία, -logia) is a meta-term covering the study of all aspects of human physical growth. (Although, it is also fundamental of biology.) Auxology is a multi-disciplinary science involving health sciences/medicine (pediatrics, general practice, endocrinology, neuroendocrinology, physiology, epidemiology), and to a lesser extent: nutrition science, genetics, anthropology, anthropometry, ergonomics, history, economic history, economics, socio-economics, sociology, public health, and psychology, among others.

== History of auxology ==
""Ancient Babylonians and Egyptians left some writings on child growth and variation in height between ethnic groups. In the late 18th century, scattered documents of child growth started to appear in the scientific literature, the studies of Jamberts in 1754 and the annual measurements of the son of Montbeillard published by Buffon in 1777 being the most cited ones [1]. Louis René Villermé (1829) was the first to realize that growth and adult height of an individual depend on the country's socio-economic situation. In the 19th century, the number of growth studies rapidly increased, with increasing interest also in growth velocity [2]. Günther documented monthly height increments in a group of 33 boys of various ages [3]. Kotelmann [4] first noted the adolescent growth spurt. In fact, the adolescent growth spurt appears to be a novel achievement in the history of human growth and the amount and intensity of the spurt seems to be greatest in tall and affluent populations [5]. By the beginning of the 20th century, national growth tables were published for most European nations with data for height, weight, and attempts to relate weight and height, though none of these were references in the proper sense of the word as the data were usually derived from small and unrepresentative samples. After the 1930s X-ray imaging of hand and wrist became popular for determining bone age. Current auxo-logical knowledge is based on the large national studies performed in the 1950s, 1960s and the 1970s, many of them inaugurated by James Tanner [1]. In the late 1970s a new school of anthropometric history [6] emerged among historians and economists. The main aim of this school was to evaluate secular changes in conscript height during the last 100–200 years and to associate them with socio-economic changes and political events in the different countries [7]. In the 1980s and the 1990s new mathematical approaches have been added of which the LMS method has strongly been recommended for constructing modern growth reference tables [8,9]: M stands for mean, S stands for a scaling parameter, and L stands for the Box–Cox power that is required to transform the skewed data to normality. Meanwhile, many national and international growth references are based on this technology. And in view of the general idea of growth and adult height being a mirror of nutritional status, health and wealth [10], these techniques have generally been accepted for routine screening pro-grams in Public Health. Anthropometry has also been considered essential for security purposes, for the usability of industrial products, and it has become routine for car and clothing industries, for furniture, housing, and many other aspects of design in the modern environment. Growth is defined as an increase in size over time. But the rigid metric of physical time is not directly related to the tempo at which an organism develops, matures and ages. Calendar time differs in its meaning in a fast maturing and in a slow maturing organism. Fast maturing children appear tall and "older" than their calendar age suggests, late maturers appear "too young" and often short even though both may later reach the same adult size. Whereas metric scales exist for height, weight and other amplitude parameters, there are no continuous scales for maturation and developmental tempo. Instead we are used to work with substitutes like the 5-step Tanner scale for staging puberty, and age equivalents for describing bone..." is an excerpt taken from Human Growth and Development by Borms, J., R. Hauspie, A. Sand, C. Susanne, and M. Hebbelinck, eds

From the taken section above we can see that ancient cultures left writings and indicators of growth from childhood into adulthood, such as the Ancient Babylonians and Egyptians. Though it wouldn't been until the later part of the 1700s that it would appear in scientific literature in the light of the Age of Enlightenment. A movement of philosophical and scientific advancement and understanding that dominated the western world in the 18th century. As the ideals and respect of science and mathematics grew we see such men as Louis-René Villermé a physician and economist begin to take interest and realize the growth of individuals into adulthood had factors in their socio-economic situation and status. From there the study would continue to grow at a rapid rate.

Contemporaries would then catch on reaching from the interest in Growth chart which kept marks on growth velocity into more medical sided interest for public health in the sense of tracking one's own growth and health to set standards.

== In relation to anthropology ==
As Biological anthropology is a sub-field of anthropology that provides insight into the biological/physical perspective of human beings and our ancestors, one can easily see how auxology relates to the anthropological fields. This can be seen through the study of physical human development and growth to the slight Sexual dimorphism within Human along with the maturing of the body such as the physical change from childhood into adulthood.

Auxology can also be used in the comparing of remains such as that of Neanderthal, Homo habilis and Australopithecus afarensis to any relation of Hominidae.

== Notable auxologists ==
- Joerg Baten (economist, anthropometric historian)
- Barry Bogin (anthropologist)
- Noel Cameron (pediatrician, anthropologist)
- J. W. Drukker (economist, historian, ergonomist)
- Stanley Engerman (economist)
- Robert Fogel (economist)
- Theo Gasser (statistician, human biologist)
- Michael Healy (statistician)
- Michael Hermanussen (pediatrician, human biologist)
- Francis E. Johnston (anthropologist)
- John Komlos (economist, anthropometric historian)
- Gregory Livshits (human biologist)
- Robert Margo (economist)
- Alex F. Roche (pediatrician)
- Lawrence M. Schell (anthropologist)
- Nevin Scrimshaw (nutritionist)
- Anne Sheehy (human biologist)
- Richard Steckel (economist, anthropometric historian)
- Pak Sunyoung (anthropologist)
- James M. Tanner (pediatrician)
- Vincent Tassenaar (historian)
- Louis-René Villermé (Economist, Physician)
- Lucio Vinicius (anthropologist, human biologist)
- Krishna Kumar Choudhary (Public Health scholar, India)

- Florencio Escardó
- Garrahan

== See also ==
- Anthropometric history
- Human biology
- Human development (biology)
- Human height
- Human weight
- Human variability
- Malnutrition
- Nature versus nurture
- Population health
- Quality of life
- Social determinants of health and Social epidemiology
- Socioeconomics
- Standard of living
- Rod Usher
- Physical Anthropology
