= History of agriculture in the United States =

The history of agriculture in the United States covers the period from the first English settlers to the present day. In Colonial America, agriculture was the primary livelihood for 90% of the population, and most towns were shipping points for the export of agricultural products. Most farms were geared toward subsistence production for family use. The rapid growth of population and the expansion of the frontier opened up large numbers of new farms, and clearing the land was a major preoccupation of farmers. After 1800, cotton became the chief crop in southern plantations, and the chief American export. After 1840, industrialization and urbanization opened up lucrative domestic markets. The number of farms grew from 1.4 million in 1850, to 4.0 million in 1880, and 6.4 million in 1910; then started to fall, dropping to 5.6 million in 1950 and 2.2 million in 2008.

1946 pictorial map, representing agricultural wealth of the United States.

== Pre-Colonial era ==
Before the arrival of Europeans in North America, the continent supported a diverse range of indigenous cultures. While some populations were primarily hunter-gatherers, other populations relied on agriculture. Native Americans farmed domesticated crops in the Eastern Woodlands, the Great Plains, and the American Southwest.

== Colonial farming: 1610–1775 ==
Beginning in 1620, the first settlers in Plymouth Colony planted barley and peas from England but their most important crop was Indian corn (maize) which they were shown how to cultivate by the native Squanto. To fertilize this crop, they used small fish which they called herrings or shads.

Beginning in 1619, Southern plantation agriculture, using slaves, developed in Virginia and Maryland (where tobacco was grown), and South Carolina (where indigo and rice was grown). Cotton became a major plantation crop after 1800 in the "Black Belt," and throughout the region from North Carolina in an arc through Texas where the climate allowed for cotton cultivation.

Apart from the tobacco and rice plantations, the great majority of farms were subsistence, producing food for the family and some for trade and taxes. Throughout the colonial period, subsistence farming was pervasive. Farmers supplemented their income with sales of surplus crops or animals in the local market, or by exports to the slave colonies in the British West Indies. Logging, hunting and fishing supplemented the family economy.

=== Ethnic farming styles ===
Ethnicity made a difference in agricultural practice. German Americans brought with them practices and traditions that were quite different from those of the English and Scots. They adapted Old World techniques to a much more abundant land supply. For example, they generally preferred oxen to horses for plowing. Furthermore, the Germans showed a long-term tendency to keep the farm in the family and to avoid having their children move to towns. The Scots Irish built their livelihoods on some farming but more herding (of hogs and cattle). In the American colonies, the Scots-Irish focused on mixed farming. Using this technique, they grew corn for human consumption and for livestock feed, especially for hogs. Many improvement-minded farmers of different backgrounds began using new agricultural practices to increase their output. During the 1750s, these agricultural innovators replaced the hand sickles and scythes used to harvest hay, wheat, and barley with the cradle scythe, a tool with wooden fingers that arranged the stalks of grain for easy collection. This tool was able to triple the amount of work done by a farmer in one day. A few scientifically informed farmers (mostly wealthy planters like George Washington) began fertilizing their fields with dung and lime and rotating their crops to keep the soil fertile.

Before 1720, most colonists in the mid-Atlantic region worked in small-scale farming and paid for imported manufactures by supplying the West Indies with corn and flour. In New York, a fur-pelt export trade to Europe flourished and added additional wealth to the region. After 1720, mid-Atlantic farming was stimulated by the international demand for wheat. A massive population explosion in Europe drove wheat prices up. By 1770, a bushel of wheat cost twice as much as it did in 1720. Farmers also expanded their production of flaxseed and corn since flax was in high demand in the Irish linen industry and a demand for corn existed in the West Indies.

Many poor German immigrants and Scots-Irish settlers began their careers as agricultural wage laborers. Merchants and artisans hired teen-aged indentured servants, paying the transportation over from Europe, as workers for a domestic system for the manufacture of cloth and other goods. Merchants often bought wool and flax from farmers and employed newly arrived immigrants who had been textile workers in Ireland and Germany to work in their homes spinning the materials into yarn and cloth. Large farmers and merchants became wealthy, while farmers with smaller farms and artisans only made enough for subsistence.

== New nation: 1776–1860 ==
The U.S. economy was primarily agricultural in the early 19th century. Westward expansion, including the Louisiana Purchase and American victory in the War of 1812 plus the building of canals and the introduction of steamboats opened up new areas for agriculture. Most farming was designed to produce food for the family, and service small local markets. In times of rapid economic growth, a farmer could still improve the land for far more than he paid for it, and then move further west to repeat the process. While the land was cheap and fertile, the process of clearing it and building farmsteads wasn't. Frontier life wasn't new for Americans but presented new challenges for farm families who faced the challenges of bringing their produce to market across vast distances. Although the production expanded very rapidly, during the Antebellum decades per capita food production did not keep pace with the rapidly expanding urban population and industrial labor.

=== South ===
In the Southern United States, the poor lands were held by poor white farmers, who generally owned no slaves. The best lands were held by rich plantation owners and were operated primarily with slave labor. These farms grew their own food and also concentrated on a few "cash crops" that could be exported to meet the growing demand in Europe, especially cotton, tobacco, and sugar. The cotton gin made it possible to increase cotton production. Cotton became the main export crop, but after a few years, the fertility of the soil was depleted and the plantation was moved to the new land further west. Much land was cleared and put into growing cotton in the Mississippi valley and in Alabama, and new grain growing areas were brought into production in the Mid West. Eventually this put severe downward pressure on prices, particularly of cotton, first from 1820 to 1823 and again from 1840 to 1843. Sugar cane was being grown in Louisiana, where it was refined into granular sugar. Growing and refining sugar required a large amount of capital. Some of the nation's wealthiest men owned sugar plantations, which often had their own sugar mills.

=== New England ===
In New England, subsistence agriculture gave way after 1810 to production to provide food and dairy supplies for the rapidly growing industrial towns and cities. New specialty export crops were introduced such as tobacco and cranberries.

=== Western frontier ===
The British government attempted to restrict westward expansion with the ineffective Proclamation Line of 1763, abolished by the new United States government. The first major movement west of the Appalachian Mountains began in Pennsylvania, Virginia and North Carolina as soon as the war was won in 1781. Pioneers housed themselves in a rough lean-to or at most a one-room log cabin. The main food supply at first came from hunting deer, turkeys, and other abundant small game.

Clad in typical frontier garb, leather breeches, moccasins, fur cap, and hunting shirt, and girded by a belt from which hung a hunting knife and a shot pouch – all homemade – the pioneer presented a unique appearance. In a short time he opened in the woods a patch, or clearing, on which he grew corn, wheat, flax, tobacco and other products, even fruit. In a few years the pioneer added hogs, sheep and cattle, and perhaps acquired a horse. Homespun clothing replaced the animal skins. The more restless pioneers grew dissatisfied with over civilized life, and uprooted themselves again to move 50 or hundred miles (80 or 160 km) further west.

In 1788, American pioneers to the Northwest Territory established Marietta, Ohio as the first permanent American settlement in the Northwest Territory. By 1813 the western frontier had reached the Mississippi River. St. Louis, Missouri was the largest town on the frontier, the gateway for travel westward, and a principal trading center for Mississippi River traffic and inland commerce. There was wide agreement on the need to settle the new territories quickly, but the debate polarized over the price the government should charge. The conservatives and Whigs, typified by president John Quincy Adams, wanted a moderated pace that charged the newcomers enough to pay the costs of the federal government. The Democrats, however, tolerated a wild scramble for land at very low prices. The final resolution came in the Homestead Law of 1862, with a moderated pace that gave settlers 160 acres free after they worked on it for five years.

From the 1770s to the 1830s, pioneers moved into the new lands that stretched from Kentucky to Alabama to Texas. Most were farmers who moved in family groups. Historian Louis M. Hacker shows how wasteful the first generation of pioneers was; they were too ignorant to cultivate the land properly and when the natural fertility of virgin land was used up, they sold out and moved west to try again. Hacker describes that in Kentucky about 1812:

Farms were for sale with from ten to fifty acres cleared, possessing log houses, peach and sometimes apple orchards, inclosed in fences, and having plenty of standing timber for fuel. The land was sown in wheat and corn, which were the staples, while hemp [for making rope] was being cultivated in increasing quantities in the fertile river bottoms. ... Yet, on the whole, it was an agricultural society without skill or resources. It committed all those sins which characterize a wasteful and ignorant husbandry. Grass seed was not sown for hay and as a result, the farm animals had to forage for themselves in the forests; the fields were not permitted to lie in pasturage; a single crop was planted in the soil until the land was exhausted; the manure was not returned to the fields; only a small part of the farm was brought under cultivation, the rest being permitted to stand in timber. Instruments of cultivation were rude and clumsy and only too few, many of them being made on the farm. It is plain why the American frontier settler was on the move continually. It was, not his fear of a too close contact with the comforts and restraints of a civilized society that stirred him into a ceaseless activity, nor merely the chance of selling out at a profit to the coming wave of settlers; it was his wasting land that drove him on. Hunger was the goad. The pioneer farmer's ignorance, his inadequate facilities for cultivation, his limited means, of transport necessitated his frequent changes of scene. He could succeed only with virgin soil.

Hacker adds that the second wave of settlers reclaimed the land, repaired the damage, and practiced a more sustainable agriculture.

== Railroad age: 1850s–1914 ==
A dramatic expansion in farming took place from 1860 to 1910 as cheap rail transportation replaced long wagon trips and opened the way for sales to Eastern cities and exports to Europe. The number of farms tripled from 2.0 million in 1860 to 6.0 million in 1906. The number of people living on farms grew from about 10 million in 1860 to 22 million in 1880 to 31 million in 1905. The value of farms soared from $8 billion in 1860 to $30 billion in 1906.

The federal government issued 160-acre (65 ha) tracts for very cheap costs to about 400,000 families who settled new land under the Homestead Act of 1862. Even larger numbers purchased lands at very low interest from the new railroads, which were trying to create markets. The railroads advertised heavily in Europe and brought over, at low fares, hundreds of thousands of farmers from Germany, Scandinavia, and Britain. The Government of Canada's Dominion Lands Act of 1872 served a similar function for establishing homesteads on the prairies in Canada.

The first years of the 20th century were prosperous for all American farmers. The years 1910–1914 became a statistical benchmark, called "parity", that organized farm groups wanted the government to use as a benchmark for the level of prices and profits they felt they deserved.

=== Mechanization of farming ===
Mechanization and new technologies transformed farming practices over time. By the late 19th century the U.S. had the largest and most productive system of commercial agriculture in the world. Rural towns competed for access to the new railroad system. Towns that got a station sharply cut the cost of travel and shipping farm products out and consumer products in. Towns with a station attracted families that had the money to get established in farming.

Regarding the labor needed to produce one bushel of wheat, the U.S. Department of Agriculture states:

1894 being compared with 1830, the required human labor declined from three hours and three minutes to ten minutes. The heavy, clumsy plow of 1830 had given way to the disk plow that both plowed and pulverized the soil in the same operation; hand sowing had been displaced by the mechanical seeder drawn by horses; the cradling and thrashing with flails and hand winnowing had given way to reaping, thrashing, and sacking with the combined reaper and thrasher drawn by horses.

The time decline of 95% for wheat was followed by an 85% decline in the time for corn:

From 1855 to 1894 the time of human labor required to produce one bushel of corn on an average declined from four hours and thirty four minutes to forty-one minutes. This was because inventors had given to the farmers of 1894 the gang plow, the disk harrow, the corn planter drawn by horses, and the four-section harrow for pulverizing the top soil; because they had given to the farmer the self-binder drawn by horses to cut the stalks and bind them ; a machine for removing the husks from the ears and in the same operation for cutting the husks, stalks, and blades for feeding, the power being supplied by a steam engine; because they had given to the farmer a marvelous corn sheller, operated by steam and shelling one bushel of corn per minute instead of the old way of corn shelling in which the labor of one man was required for one hundred minutes to do the same work.

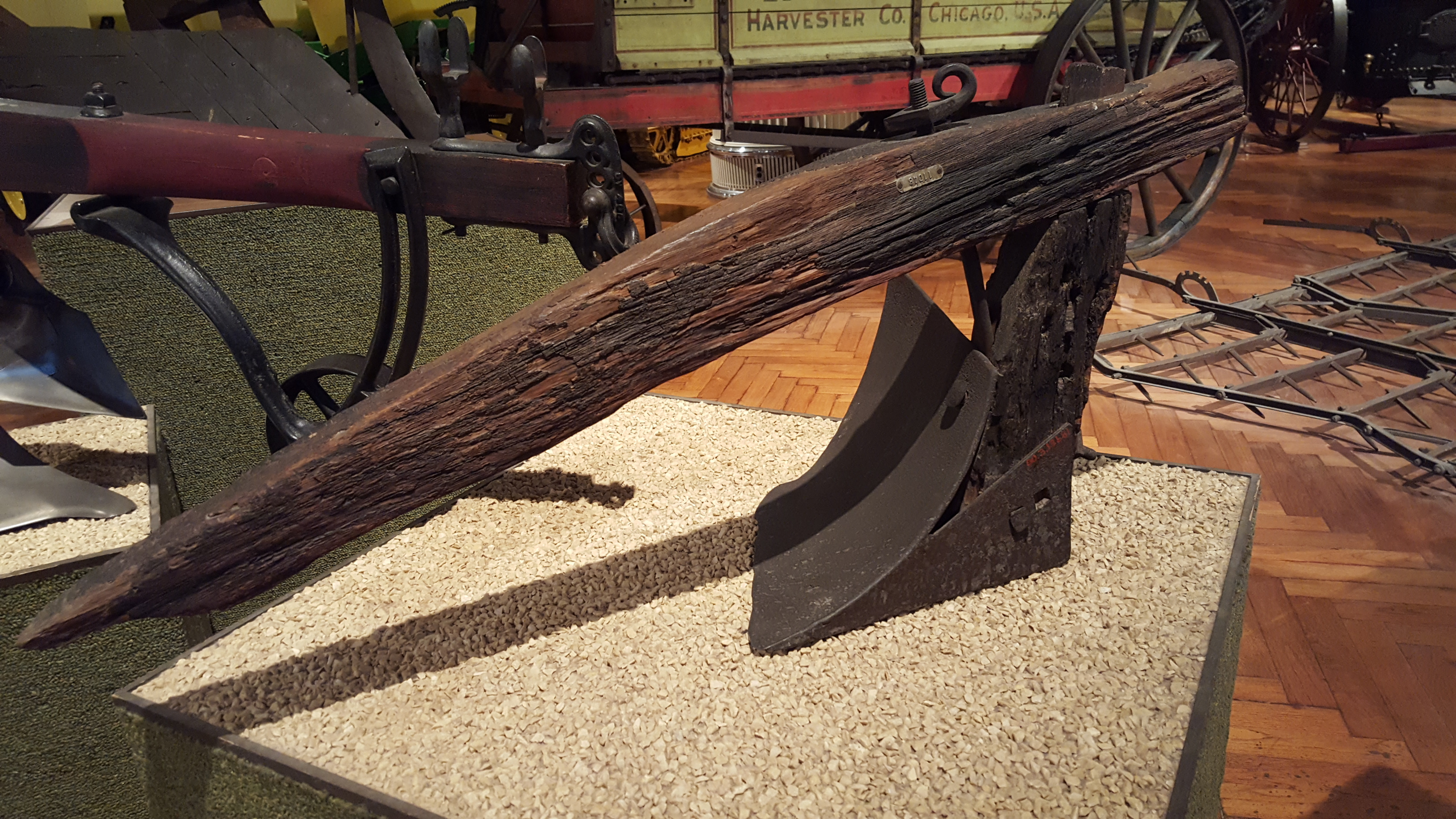
John Deere plow c. 1845

==== John Deere plows ====
Deere & Company began when John Deere (1804-1886) moved to Illinois in 1836, A blacksmith, Deere concentrated on inventing a plow that could break the thick prairie soil in Illinois. He soon fastened a steel saw blade into a plow. Until then farmers used iron or wooden plows to which the rich soil stuck, so they had to be cleaned frequently. Deere created a highly polished steel surface that allowed the soil to slide easily.

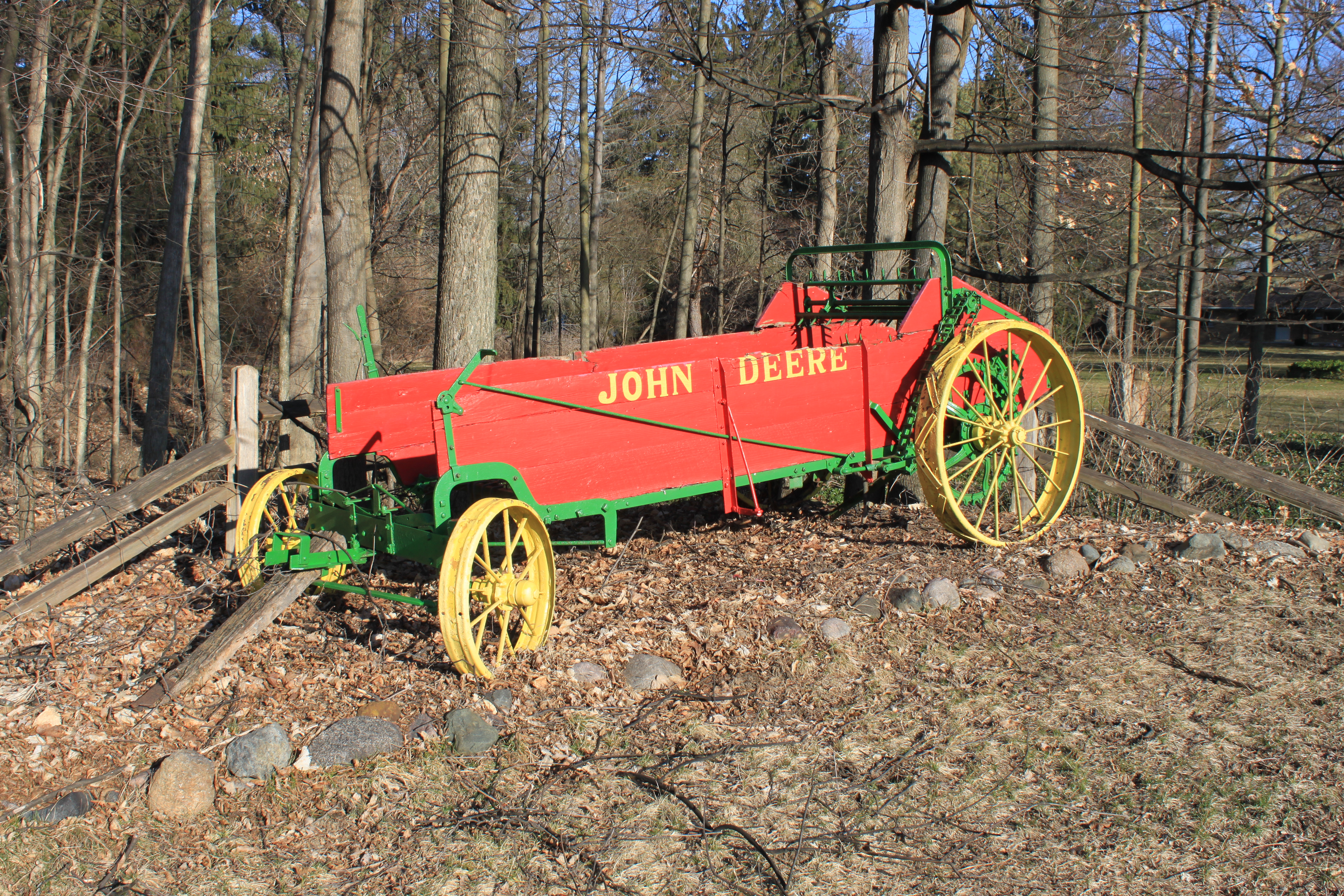
Horse-drawn manure spreader.

Deere built 100 plows in 1842, and around 400 plows in 1843. In 1848, Deere relocated to Moline, Illinois, to have access to the railroad and the Mississippi River. By 1849, the Deere Company was producing over 200 plows a month. After 1853 it expanded to building wagons, corn planters, cultivators and other farm equipment. In 1857, it built 1,120 implements per month. Other competitors created similar plows to enable farmers to handle the cheap and highly productive but tough Midwestern soil.

==== Mechanical reapers ====
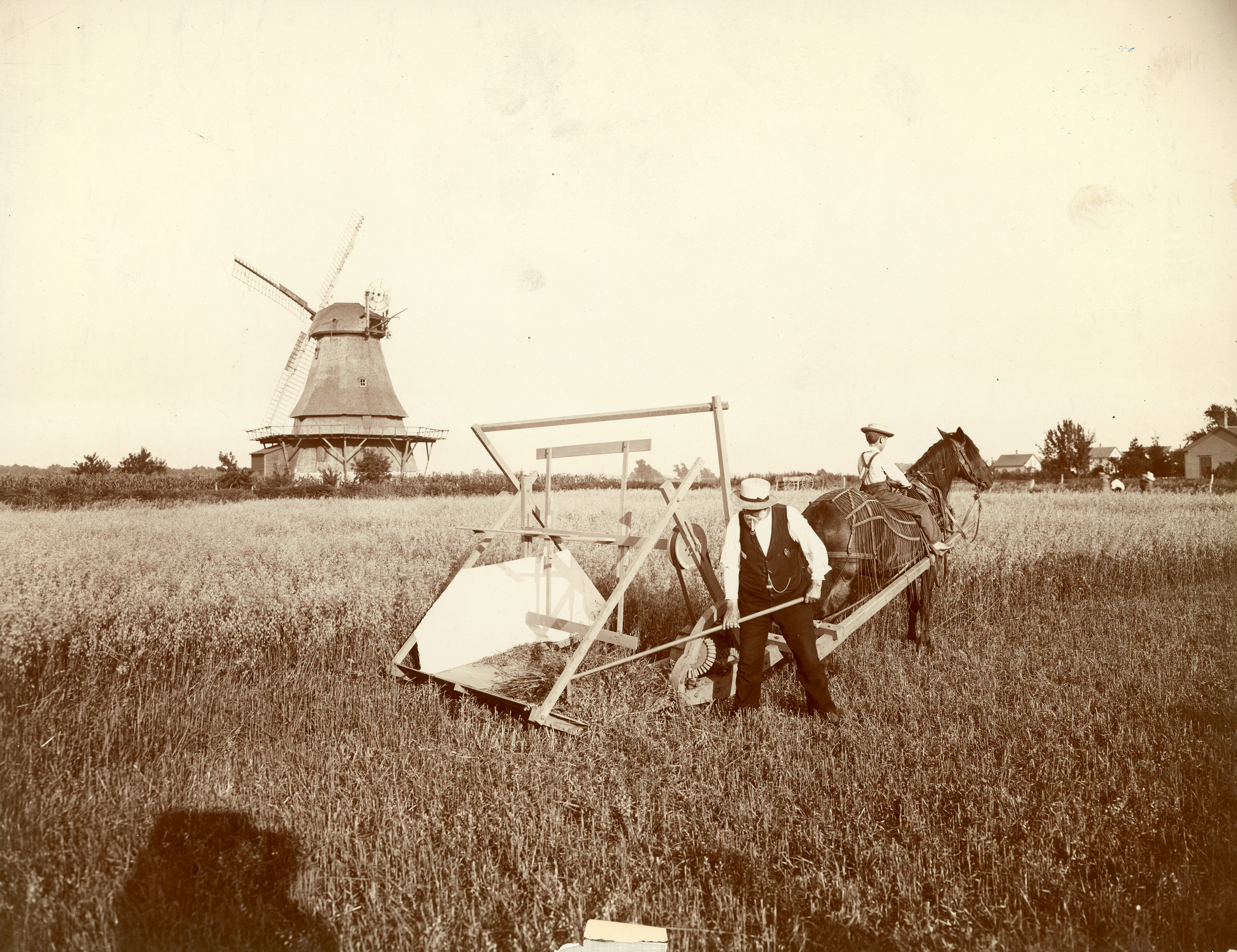
McCormick's first reaper. For a 25 minute film that gives his story see online at YouTube.

A mechanical reaper is a semi-automated device that harvests crops, especially grains such as wheat. Reapers and their descendant machines have been an important part of mechanized agriculture and a main feature of growing agricultural productivity.

In the mid-19th century many inventors in the United States made innovations in reapers. The various designs competed with each other, and were the subject of thousands of patents and hundreds of lawsuits. The issue was resolved with the creation of International Harvester in 1902, which bought out most of the major companies and focused on mass production of the best models.

The McCormick Reaper was first designed by Robert McCormick in Virginia in the 1820s. By 1831 his son Cyrus H. McCormick took over; he obtained the first of many patents in 1834. By 1842 his machine worked fairly well, and started to sell.

The McCormick reaper comprised:

- a main wheel frame
- projected to the side a platform containing a cutter bar having fingers through which reciprocated a knife driven by a crank
- upon the outer end of the platform was a divider projecting ahead of the platform to separate the grain to be cut from that to be left standing
- a reel was positioned above the platform to hold the grain against the reciprocating knife to throw it back upon the platform
- the machine was drawn by a team walking at the side of the grain.

Obed Hussey in Ohio patented his Hussey Reaper in 1833. Hussey's design was a major improvement in reaping efficiency. The new reaper only required two horses working in a non-strenuous manner, a man to work the machine, and another person to drive. In addition, the Hussey Reaper left an even and clean surface after its use.

Many other inventors made improvements and nearly 100,000 reaper patents were granted. The company histories tell of thousands of patent lawsuits as each maker copied the innovations made by others. McCormick pulled ahead of his many competitors by better marketing, based on a network of dealers who would provide spare parts and repairs.

There was little demand in the South, which imported food before 1861, and which was too poor too afford much equipment after 1865. New England and New York farms were usually too small to need help at harvest time. The reapers sold best in the Midwest--first in Wisconsin and Illinois. As cheaper lands opened to the west, farmers sold out and moved to large farms in the Dakotas, Kansas and Nebraska, where labor was expensive and reapers were needed to handle a large crop in a few days.

Hundreds of different local companies made reapers for the local market. For example, The Champion (Combined) Reapers and Mowers were highly successful in the 1880s.

Innovation in the 1870s produced the reaper-binder, which reaped the crop and bound it into sheaves. By 1896, 400,000 reaper-binders were harvesting grain. This device was in turn replaced by the swather and eventually the combine harvester, which reaps and threshes in one operation.

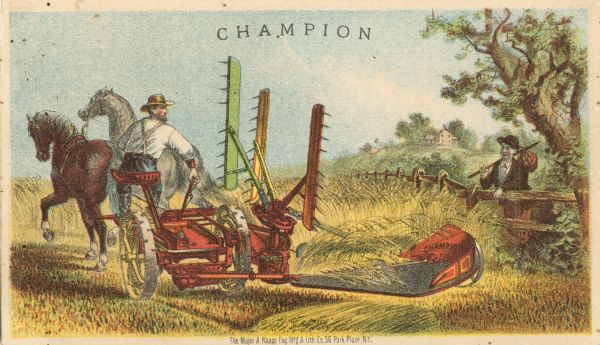
Champion reaper, trade card from 1875

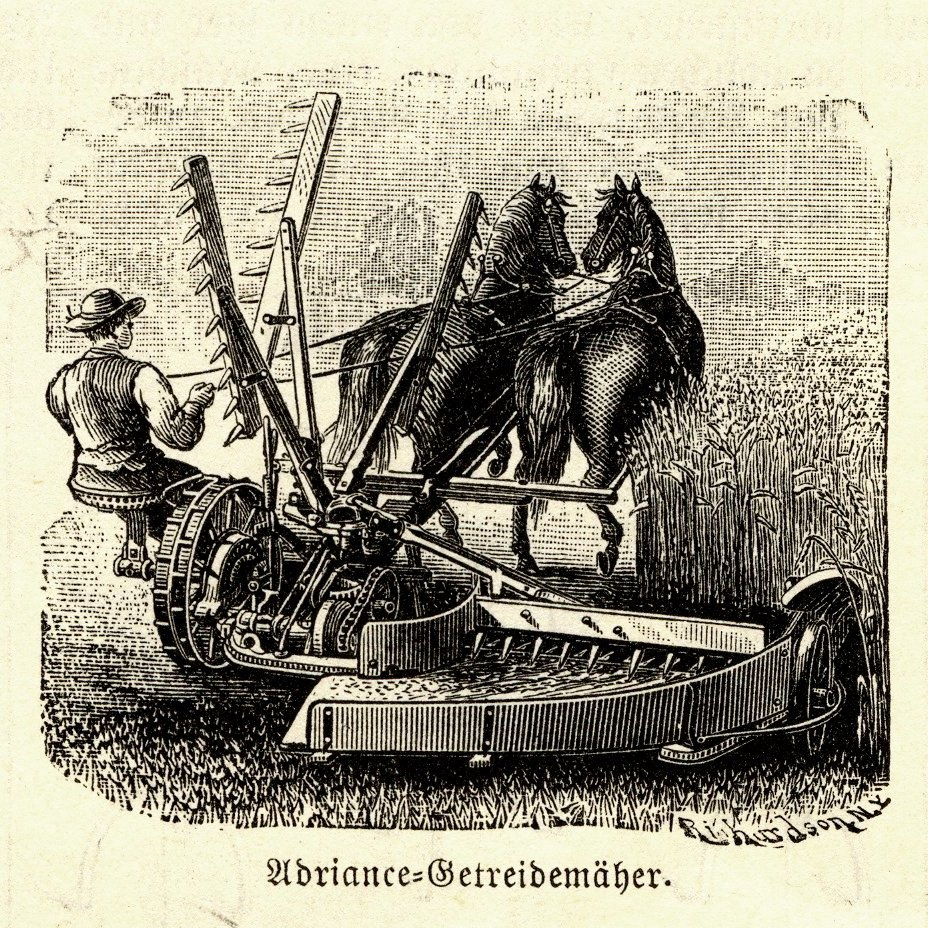
Adriance reaper, late 19th century

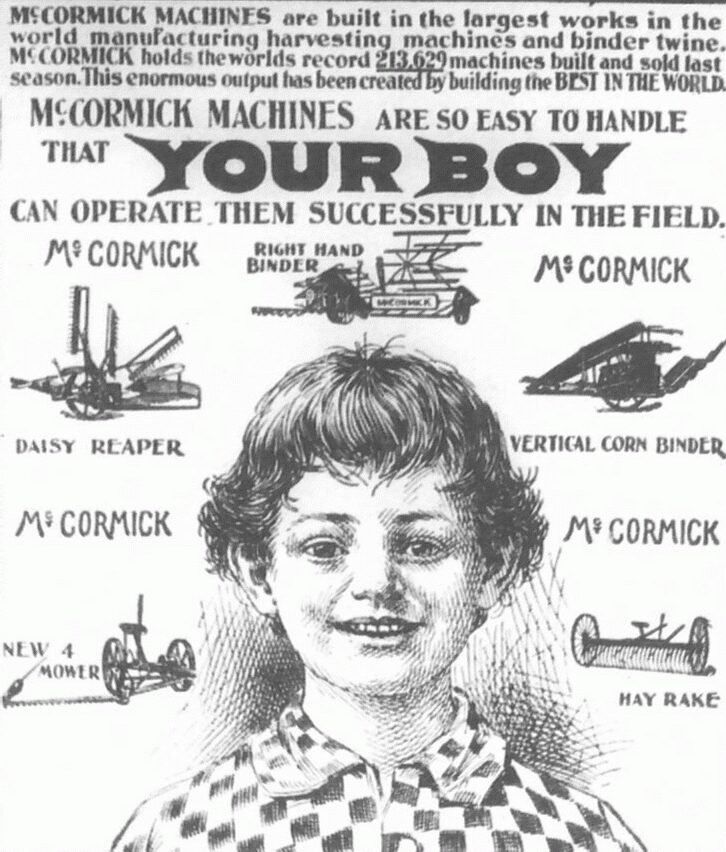
1900 ad for McCormick farm machines—"Your boy can operate them"

=== Rural life ===
==== Environmental challenges ====
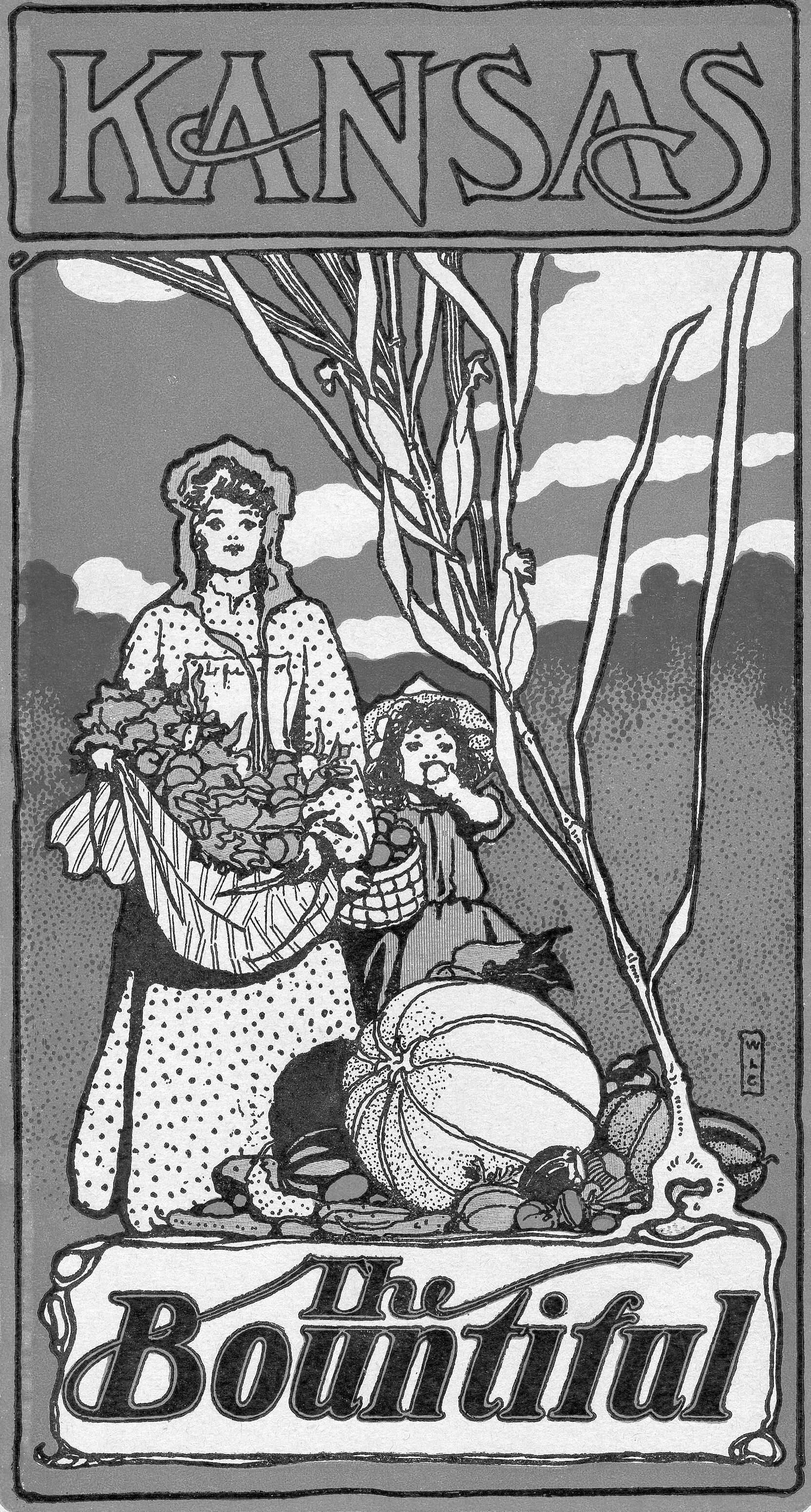
Boosterism: cover of a promotional booklet published in 1907 by the Chicago, Rock Island and Pacific Railroad.

Early settlers discovered that the Great Plains were not the "Great American Desert," but they also found that the very harsh climate—with tornadoes, blizzards, drought, hail storms, floods, and grasshopper plagues—made for a high risk of ruined crops. Many early settlers were financially ruined, especially in the early 1890s, and either protested through the Populist movement, or went back east. In the 20th century, crop insurance, new conservation techniques, and large-scale federal aid all lowered the risk. Immigrants, especially Germans and Scandinavians comprised the largest element of settlers after 1860. They sold their small farms in Europe and purchased much larger farmers in the Midwest. They were attracted by the good soil, low-priced lands from the railroad companies. The railroads offered attractive family packages. They brought in European families, with their tools, directly to the new farm, which was purchased on easy credit terms. The railroad needed settlers as much as the settlers needed farmland. Even cheaper land was available through homesteading, although it was usually not as well located as railroad land.

The problem of blowing dust resulted from too little rainfall for growing enough wheat to keep the topsoil from blowing away. In the 1930s, techniques and technologies of soil conservation, most of which had been available but ignored before the Dust Bowl conditions began, were promoted by the Soil Conservation Service (SCS) of the US Department of Agriculture, so that, with cooperation from the weather, soil condition was much improved by 1940.

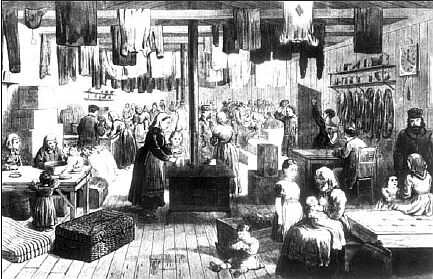
Temporary quarters for Volga Germans in central Kansas, 1875.

==== Women and the farm family ====
On the Great Plains, very few single men attempted to operate a farm or ranch. Farmers clearly understood the need for a hard-working wife, and numerous children, to handle the many chores, including child-rearing, feeding and clothing the family, managing the housework, feeding the hired hands, and, especially after the 1930s, handling the paperwork and financial details. During the early years of settlement in the late 19th century, farm women played an integral role in assuring family survival by working outdoors. After a generation or so, women increasingly left the fields, thus redefining their roles within the family. New conveniences such as sewing and washing machines encouraged women to turn to domestic roles. The scientific housekeeping movement, promoted across the land by the media and government extension agents, as well as county fairs which featured achievements in home cookery and canning, advice columns for women in the farm papers, and home economics courses in the schools.

Although the eastern image of farm life on the prairies emphasizes the isolation of the lonely farmer and farm life, rural folk created a rich social life for themselves. They often sponsored activities that combined work, food, and entertainment such as barn raisings, corn huskings, quilting bees, grange meeting, church activities, and school functions. The womenfolk organized shared meals and potluck events, as well as extended visits between families.

=== Ranching ===
Much of the Great Plains became open range, hosting cattle ranching operations on public land without charge. In the spring and fall, ranchers held roundups where their cowboys branded new calves, treated animals and sorted the cattle for sale. Such ranching began in Texas and gradually moved northward. Cowboys drove Texas cattle north to railroad lines in the cities of Dodge City, Kansas and Ogallala, Nebraska; from there, cattle were shipped eastward. British investors financed many great ranches of the era. Overstocking of the range and the terrible Winter of 1886–87 resulted in a disaster, with many cattle starved and frozen to death. From then on, ranchers generally raised feed to ensure they could keep their cattle alive over winter.

When there was too little rain for row crop farming, but enough grass for grazing, cattle ranching became dominant. Before the railroads arrived in Texas the 1870s cattle drives took large herds from Texas to the railheads in Kansas. A few thousand Indians resisted, notably the Sioux, who were reluctant to settle on reservations. However, most Indians themselves became ranch hands and cowboys. New varieties of wheat flourished in the arid parts of the Great Plains, opening much of the Dakotas, Montana, western Kansas, western Nebraska and eastern Colorado. Where it was too dry for wheat, the settlers turned to cattle ranching.

== South, 1860–1940 ==
Agriculture in the South was oriented toward large-scale plantations that produced cotton for export, as well as other export products such as tobacco and sugar. During the American Civil War, the Union blockade shut down 95 percent of the export business. Some cotton got out through blockade runners, and in conquered areas much was bought by northern speculators for shipment to Europe. The great majority of white farmers worked on small subsistence farms, that supplied the needs of the family and the local market. After the war, the world price of cotton plunged, the plantations were broken into small farms for the Freedmen, and poor whites started growing cotton because they needed the money to pay taxes.

Sharecropping became widespread in the South as a response to economic upheaval caused by the end of slavery during and after Reconstruction. Sharecropping was a way for very poor farmers, both white and black, to earn a living from land owned by someone else. The landowner provided land, housing, tools and seed, and perhaps a mule, and a local merchant provided food and supplies on credit, while the sharecropper provided the labor. At harvest time the sharecropper kept a share of the crop production (from one-third to one-half), with the landowner taking the rest. The cropper used his share to pay off his debt to the merchant. The system started with blacks when large plantations were subdivided. By the 1880s, white farmers also became sharecroppers. The system was distinct from that of the tenant farmer, who rented the land, provided his own tools and mule and kept the crop (or paid some to the landowner through "crop rent"). Landowners provided more supervision to sharecroppers, and less or none to tenant farmers. Poverty was inevitable, because world cotton prices were low.

Sawers (2005) shows how southern farmers made the mule their preferred draft animal in the South during the 1860s–1920s, primarily because it fit better with the region's geography. Mules better withstood the heat of summer, and their smaller size and hooves were well suited for such crops as cotton, tobacco, and sugar. The character of soils and climate in the lower South hindered the creation of pastures, so the mule breeding industry was concentrated in the border states of Missouri, Kentucky, and Tennessee. Transportation costs combined with topography to influence the prices of mules and horses, which in turn affected patterns of mule use. The economic and production advantages associated with mules made their use a progressive step for Southern agriculture that endured until the mechanization brought by tractors. Beginning around the mid-20th century, Texas began to transform from a rural and agricultural state to one that was urban and industrialized.

== Grange--the farmers organize ==
The Grange was an organization founded in 1867 for farmers and their wives that was strongest in the Northeast, and which promoted the modernization not only of farming practices but also of family and community life. It is still in operation.

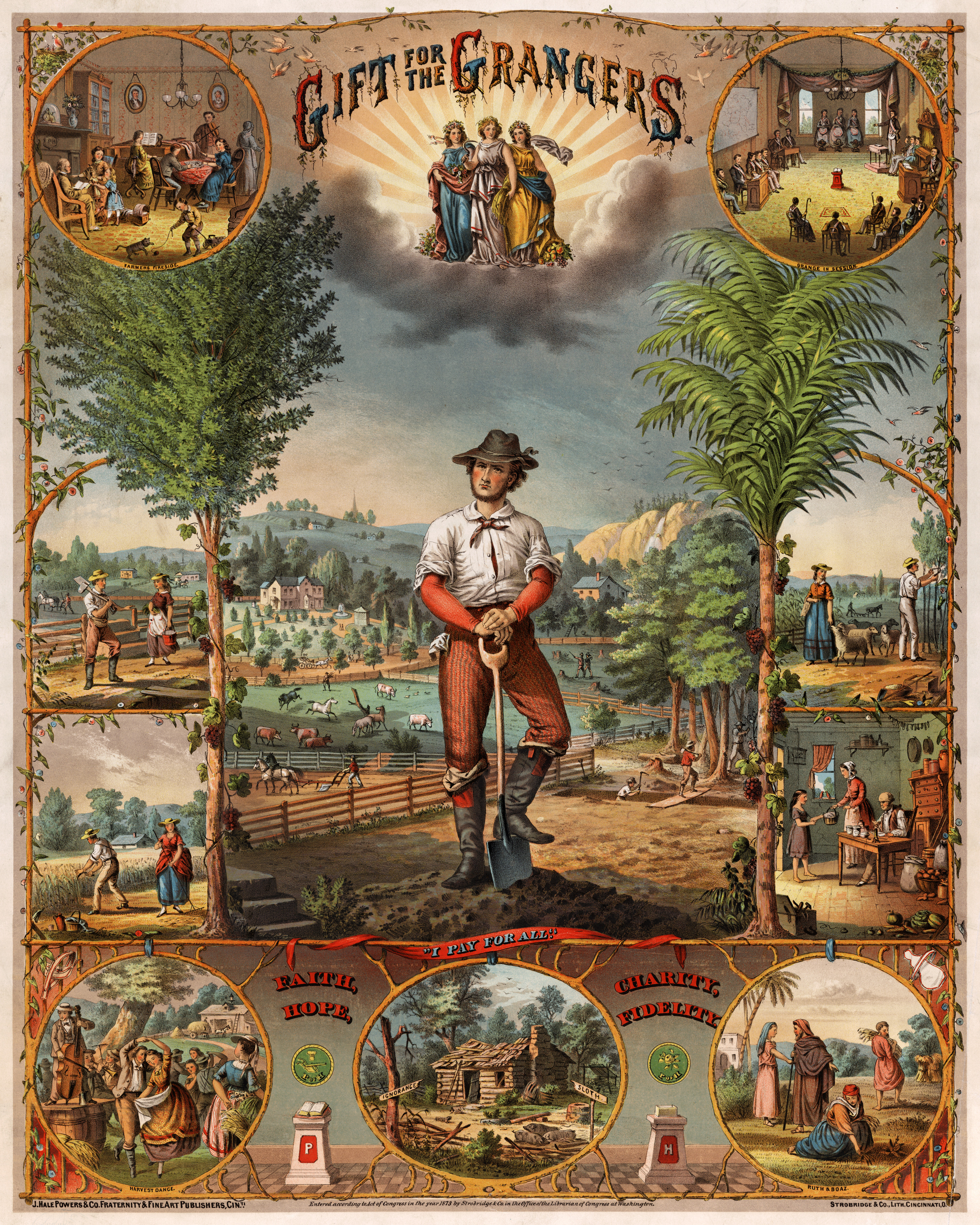
Promotional poster offering a "gift for the grangers", ca. 1873.

Membership soared from 1873 (200,000) to 1875 (858,050) as many of the state and local granges adopted non-partisan political resolutions, especially regarding the regulation of railroad transportation costs. The organization was unusual in that it allowed women and teens as equal members. Rapid growth infused the national organization with money from dues, and many local granges established consumer cooperatives, initially supplied by the Chicago wholesaler Aaron Montgomery Ward. Poor fiscal management, combined with organizational difficulties resulting from rapid growth, led to a massive decline in membership. By around the start of the 20th century, the Grange rebounded and membership stabilized.

In the mid-1870s, state Granges in the Midwest were successful in passing state laws that regulated the rates they could be charged by railroads and grain warehouses. The birth of the federal government's Cooperative Extension Service, Rural Free Delivery, and the Farm Credit System were largely due to Grange lobbying. The peak of their political power was marked by their success in Munn v. Illinois, which held that the grain warehouses were a "private utility in the public interest," and therefore could be regulated by public law (see references below, "The Granger Movement"). During the Progressive Era (1890s–1920s), political parties took up Grange causes. Consequently, local Granges focused more on community service, although the State and National Granges remain a political force.

== World War I ==
The U.S. in World War I, was a critical supplier to other Allied nations, as millions of European farmers were in the army. The rapid expansion of the farms coupled with the diffusion of trucks and Model T cars, and the tractor, allowed the agricultural market to expand to an unprecedented size.

During World War I prices shot up and farmers borrowed heavily to buy out their neighbors and expand their holdings. This gave them very high debts that made them vulnerable to the downturn in farm prices in 1920. Throughout the 1920s and down to 1934 low prices and high debt were major problems for farmers in all regions.

Beginning with the 1917 US National War Garden Commission, the government encouraged Victory gardens, agricultural plantings in private yards and public parks for personal use and for the war effort. Production from these gardens exceeded $1.2 billion by the end of World War I. Victory gardens were later encouraged during World War II when rationing made for food shortages.

== 1920s ==
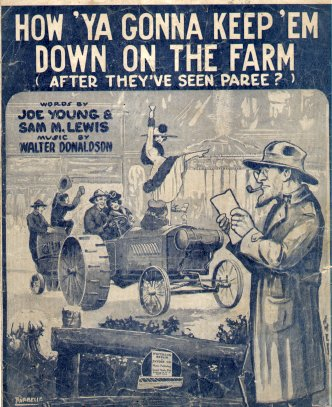
A 1919 sheet music cover

A popular Tin Pan Alley song of 1919 asked, concerning the United States troops returning from World War I, "How Ya Gonna Keep 'em Down on the Farm (After They've Seen Paree)?". As the song hints, many did not remain "down on the farm"; there was a great migration of youth from farms to nearby towns and smaller cities. The average distance moved was only 10 miles (16 km). Few went to the cities over 100,000. However, agriculture became increasingly mechanized with widespread use of the tractor, other heavy equipment, and superior techniques disseminated through County Agents, who were employed by state agricultural colleges and funded by the Federal government. The early 1920s saw a rapid expansion in the American agricultural economy largely due to new technologies and especially mechanization. Competition from Europe and Russia had disappeared due to the war and American agricultural goods were being shipped around the world.

The new technologies, such as the combine harvester, meant that the most efficient farms were larger in size and, gradually, the small family farm that had long been the model were replaced by larger and more business-oriented firms. Despite this increase in farm size and capital intensity, the great majority of agricultural production continued to be undertaken by family-owned enterprises.

World War I had created an atmosphere of high prices for agricultural products as European nations demand for exports surged. Farmers had enjoyed a period of prosperity as U.S. farm production expanded rapidly to fill the gap left as European belligerents found themselves unable to produce enough food. When the war ended, supply increased rapidly as Europe's agricultural market rebounded. Overproduction led to plummeting prices which led to stagnant market conditions and living standards for farmers in the 1920s. Worse, hundreds of thousands of farmers had taken out mortgages and loans to buy out their neighbors' property, and now are unable to meet the financial burden. The cause was the collapse of land prices after the wartime bubble when farmers used high prices to buy up neighboring farms at high prices, saddling them with heavy debts. Farmers, however, blamed the decline of foreign markets, and the effects of the protective tariff.

Farmers demanded relief as the agricultural depression grew steadily worse in the middle 1920s, while the rest of the economy flourished. Farmers had a powerful voice in Congress, and demanded federal subsidies, most notably the McNary–Haugen Farm Relief Bill. It was passed but vetoed by President Calvin Coolidge. Coolidge instead supported the alternative program of Commerce Secretary Herbert Hoover and Agriculture Secretary William M. Jardine to modernize farming, by bringing in more electricity, more efficient equipment, better seeds and breeds, more rural education, and better business practices. Hoover advocated the creation of a Federal Farm Board which was dedicated to restriction of crop production to domestic demand, behind a tariff wall, and maintained that the farmer's ailments were due to defective distribution. In 1929, the Hoover plan was adopted.

== 1930s ==
=== New Deal farm and rural programs ===
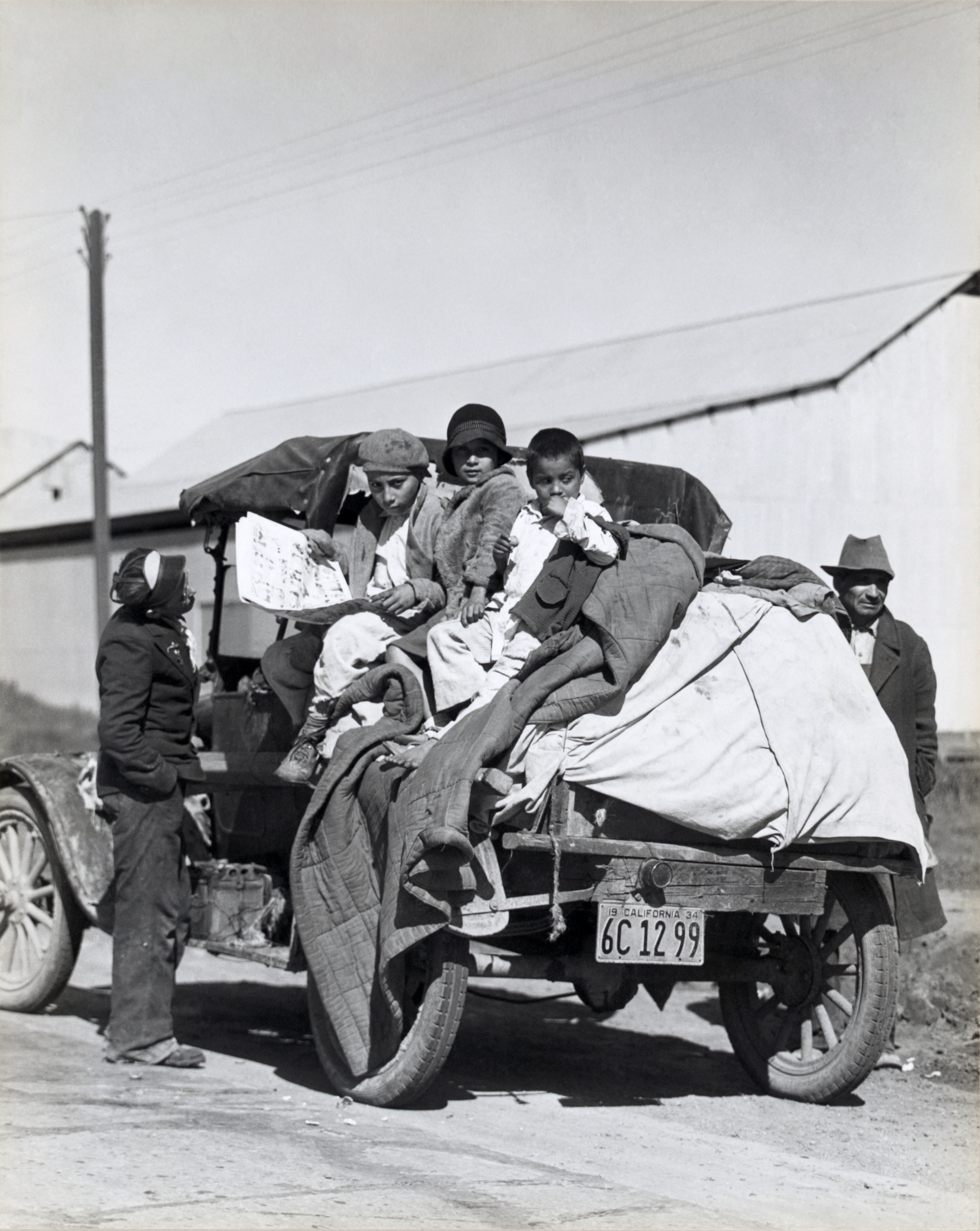
A migrant farm family in California, March 1935. Photo by Dorothea Lange.

President Franklin D. Roosevelt, a liberal Democrat, was keenly interested in farm issues and believed that true prosperity would not return until farming was prosperous. Many different New Deal programs were directed at farmers. Farming reached its low point in 1932, but even then millions of unemployed people were returning to the family farm having given up hope for a job in the cities. The main New Deal strategy was to reduce the supply of commodities, thereby raising the prices a little to the consumer, and a great deal to the farmer. Marginal farmers produce too little to be helped by the strategy; specialized relief programs were developed for them. Prosperity largely returned to the farm by 1936.

Roosevelt's "First Hundred Days" produced the Farm Security Act to raise farm incomes by raising the prices farmers received, which was achieved by reducing total farm output. In May 1933 the Agricultural Adjustment Act created the Agricultural Adjustment Administration (AAA). The act reflected the demands of leaders of major farm organizations, especially the Farm Bureau, and reflected debates among Roosevelt's farm advisers such as Secretary of Agriculture Henry A. Wallace, M.L. Wilson, Rexford Tugwell, and George Peek.

The aim of the AAA was to raise prices for commodities through artificial scarcity. The AAA used a system of "domestic allotments", setting total output of corn, cotton, dairy products, hogs, rice, tobacco, and wheat. The farmers themselves had a voice in the process of using government to benefit their incomes. The AAA paid land owners subsidies for leaving some of their land idle with funds provided by a new tax on food processing. The goal was to force up farm prices to the point of "parity", an index based on 1910–1914 prices. To meet 1933 goals, 10 million acres (40,000 km^{2}) of growing cotton was plowed up, bountiful crops were left to rot, and six million piglets were killed and discarded. The idea was the less produced, the higher the wholesale price and the higher income to the farmer. Farm incomes increased significantly in the first three years of the New Deal, as prices for commodities rose. Food prices remained well below 1929 levels.

The AAA established a long-lasting federal role in the planning of the entire agricultural sector of the economy, and was the first program on such a scale on behalf of the troubled agricultural economy. The original AAA did not provide for any sharecroppers or tenants or farm laborers who might become unemployed, but there were other New Deal programs especially for them, such as the Farm Security Administration.

In 1936, the Supreme Court of the United States declared the AAA to be unconstitutional for technical reasons; it was replaced by a similar program that did win Court approval. Instead of paying farmers for letting fields lie barren, the new program instead subsidized them for planting soil enriching crops such as alfalfa that would not be sold on the market. Federal regulation of agricultural production has been modified many times since then, but together with large subsidies the basic philosophy of subsidizing farmers is still in effect in 2015.

=== Rural relief ===
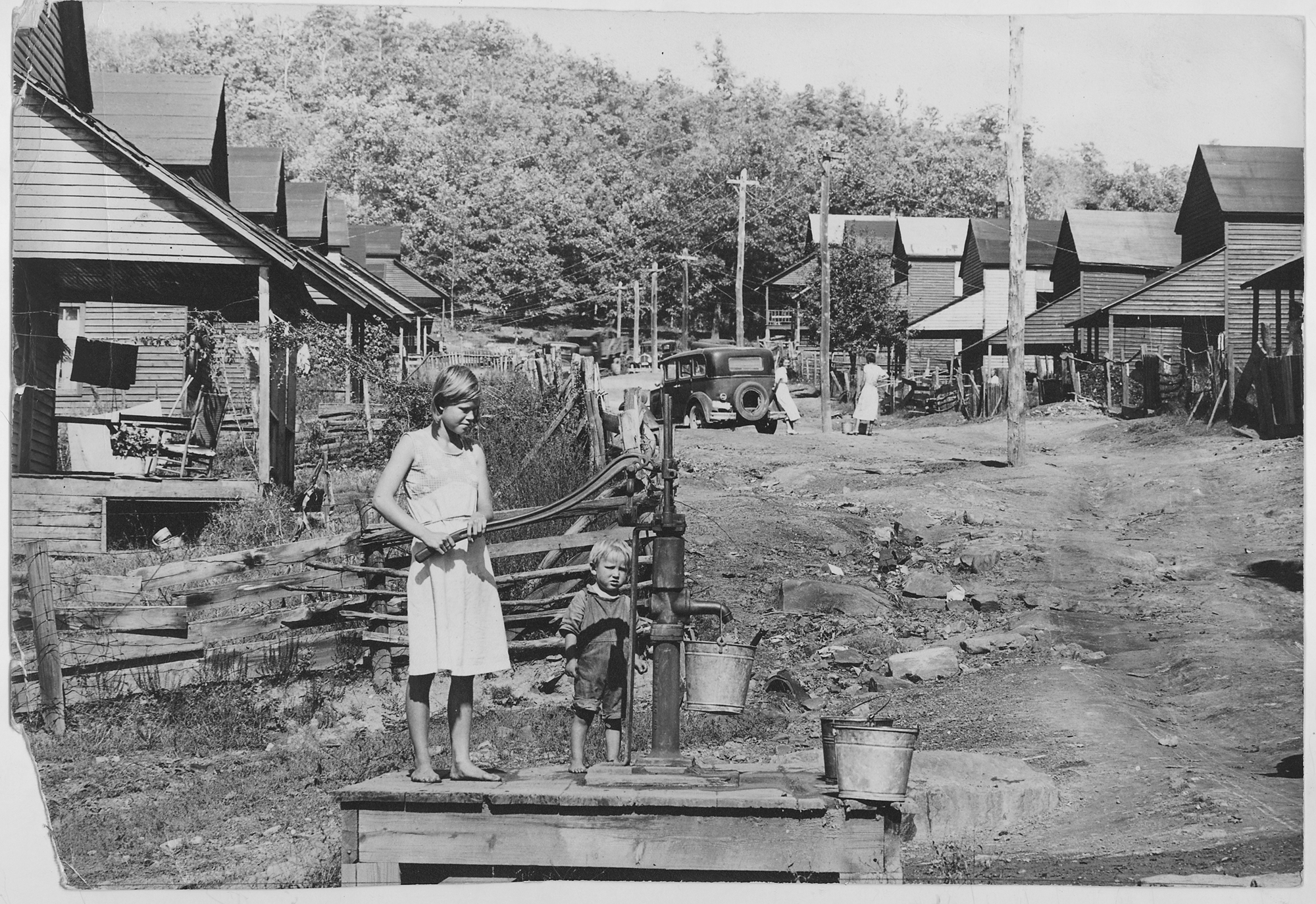
Modern methods had not reached the backwoods such as Wilder, Tennessee (Tennessee Valley Authority, 1942).

Many rural people lived in severe poverty, especially in the South. Major programs addressed to their needs included the Resettlement Administration (RA), the Rural Electrification Administration (REA), rural welfare projects sponsored by the WPA, NYA, Forest Service and CCC, including school lunches, building new schools, opening roads in remote areas, reforestation, and purchase of marginal lands to enlarge national forests. In 1933, the Administration launched the Tennessee Valley Authority, a project involving dam construction planning on an unprecedented scale in order to curb flooding, generate electricity, and modernize the very poor farms in the Tennessee Valley region of the Southern United States.

For the first time, there was a national program to help migrant and marginal farmers, through programs such as the Resettlement Administration and the Farm Security Administration. Their plight gained national attention through the 1939 novel and film The Grapes of Wrath. The New Deal thought there were too many farmers, and resisted demands of the poor for loans to buy farms. However, it made a major effort to upgrade the health facilities available to a sickly population.

=== Economics and Labor ===
In the 1930s, during the Great Depression, farm labor organized a number of strikes in various states. 1933 was a particularly active year with strikes including the California agricultural strikes of 1933, the 1933 Yakima Valley strike in Washington, and the 1933 Wisconsin milk strike.

Agriculture was prosperous during World War II, even as rationing and price controls limited the availability of meat and other foods in order to guarantee its availability to the American And Allied armed forces. During World War II, farmers were not drafted, but surplus labor, especially in the southern cotton fields, voluntarily relocated to war jobs in the cities.

During World War II, victory gardens planted at private residences and public parks were an important source of fresh produce. These gardens were encouraged by the United States Department of Agriculture. Around one third of the vegetables produced by the United States came from victory gardens.

== Since 1945 ==
=== Government policies ===
The New Deal era farm programs were continued into the 1940s and 1950s, with the goal of supporting the prices received by farmers. Typical programs involved farm loans, commodity subsidies, and price supports. The rapid decline in the farm population led to a smaller voice in Congress. So the well-organized Farm Bureau and other lobbyists, worked in the 1970s to appeal to urban Congressman through food stamp programs for the poor. By 2000, the food stamp program was the largest component of the farm bill. In 2010, the Tea Party movement brought in many Republicans committed to cutting all federal subsidies, including those agriculture. Meanwhile, urban Democrats strongly opposed reductions, pointing to the severe hardships caused by the 2008–10 economic recession. Though the Agricultural Act of 2014 saw many rural Republican Congressman voting against the program, it passed with bipartisan support.

=== Changing technology ===
Ammonia from plants built during World War II to make explosives became available for making fertilizers, leading to a permanent decline in real fertilizer prices and expanded use. The early 1950s was the peak period for tractor sales in the U.S. as the few remaining mules and work horses were sold for dog food. The horsepower of farm machinery underwent a large expansion. A successful cotton picking machine was introduced in 1949. The machine could do the work of 50 men picking by hand. The great majority of unskilled farm laborers move to urban areas.

Research on plant breeding produced varieties of grain crops that could produce high yields with heavy fertilizer input. This resulted in the Green revolution, beginning in the 1940s. By 2000 yields of corn (maize) had risen by a factor of over four. Wheat and soybean yields also rose significantly.

=== Economics and labor ===
After 1945, a continued annual 2% increase in productivity (as opposed to 1% from 1835 to 1935) led to further increases in farm size and corresponding reductions in the number of farms. Many farmers sold out and moved to nearby towns and cities. Others switched to part-time operation, supported by off-farm employment.

The 1960s and 1970s saw major farm worker strikes including the 1965 Delano grape strike and the 1970 Salad Bowl strike. In 1975, the California Agricultural Labor Relations Act of 1975 was enacted, establishing the right to collective bargaining for farmworkers in California, a first in U.S. history. Individuals with prominent roles in farm worker organizing in this period include Cesar Chavez, Dolores Huerta, Larry Itliong, and Philip Vera Cruz. Chavez mobilized California workers into the United Farm Workers organization.

In 1990, undocumented workers made up an estimated 14 percent of the farm workforce. By the year 2000, the percentage had grown to over 50%, and has remained around 50% in the 2000-2020 period.

In 2015, grain farmers started taking "an extreme step, one not widely seen since the 1980s" by breaching lease contracts with their landowners, reducing the amount of land they sow and risking long legal battles with landlords.

=== Technology ===
New machinery—especially large self-propelled combines and mechanical cotton pickers—sharply reduced labor requirements in harvesting.

In addition, electric motors and irrigation pumps opened up new ways to be efficient. Electricity also played a role in making major innovations in animal husbandry possible, especially modern milking parlors, grain elevators, and CAFOs (confined animal-feeding operations). Advances in fertilizers, herbicides, insecticides and fungicides, the use of antibiotics and growth hormones. Significant advances occurred in plant breeding and animal breeding, such as crop hybridization, GMOs (genetically modified organisms), and artificial insemination of livestock. Post-harvest innovations occurred in food processing and food distribution (e.g. frozen foods).

=== Fears about agricultural land adequacy ===
In the far suburbs of most major cities, farming activity sharply declined after 1945. Farms were bought up for suburban development and shopping malls, or purchased to become recreational facilities.

According to historian Tim Lehman, concerns were first raised in the late 20th century regarding the long-term adequacy of the nation's agricultural lands. At the federal level studies were made and programs were proposed and some launched to preserve farmlands from conversion to other uses. An awareness of the need for agricultural conservation followed a history of agricultural abundance, as seen in the rapid settlement of western lands in the 1850s to 1880s. The new theme emerged in the Progressive conservation movement, in Hugh Hammond Bennett's soil conservation crusade, and the land utilization movement of the 1920s. The New Deal made a major national program of land use planning. A land acquisition program, soil conservation districts, and county land use planning agreement all contained elements of federal agricultural land use planning, but none of these policies were entirely successful. Scarcity issues faded during the 1950s and 1960s as agricultural productivity soared. The publication of Rachel Carson's Silent Spring in 1962 energized the environmental movement and brought a new awareness in how industrialized agriculture misused the available land with dangerous chemicals. Decades of suburbanization, rapid national and global population growth, renewed worries about soil erosion, fears of oil and water shortages, and the sudden increase in farm exports beginning in 1972 all were worrisome threats to the long-term supply of good farmland. The Carter administration in the late 1970s supported initiatives like the National Agricultural Lands Survey and liberals in Congress introduced legislation to control suburban sprawl.

However, the Reagan administration and the Department of Agriculture were opposed to new regulations, and no major program was enacted.

== Crops ==
=== Wheat ===
Wheat, used for bread, pastries, pasta, and pizza, has been the principal cereal crop since the 18th century. It was introduced by the first English colonists and quickly became the main cash crop of farmers who sold it to urban populations and exporters. In colonial times its culture became concentrated in the Middle Colonies, which became known as the "bread colonies". In the mid-18th century, wheat culture spread to the tidewaters of Maryland and Virginia, where George Washington was a prominent grower as he diversified away from tobacco. The crop moved west, with Ohio as the center in 1840 and Illinois in 1860. Illinois replaced its wheat with corn (which was used locally to feed hogs). The invention of mechanical harvesters, drawn first by horses and then tractors, made larger farms much more efficient than small ones. The farmers had to borrow money to buy land and equipment and had to specialize in wheat, which made them highly vulnerable to price fluctuations and gave them an incentive to ask for government help to stabilize or raise prices. Wheat farming depended on significant labor input only during planting, and especially at harvest time. Therefore, successful farmers, especially on the Great Plains, bought up as much land as possible, purchased very expensive mechanical equipment, and depended on migrating hired laborers at harvesting time. The migrant families tended to be social outcasts without local roots and mostly lived near the poverty line, except in the harvesting season. From 1909 to today, North Dakota and Kansas have vied for first place in wheat production, followed by Oklahoma and Montana.

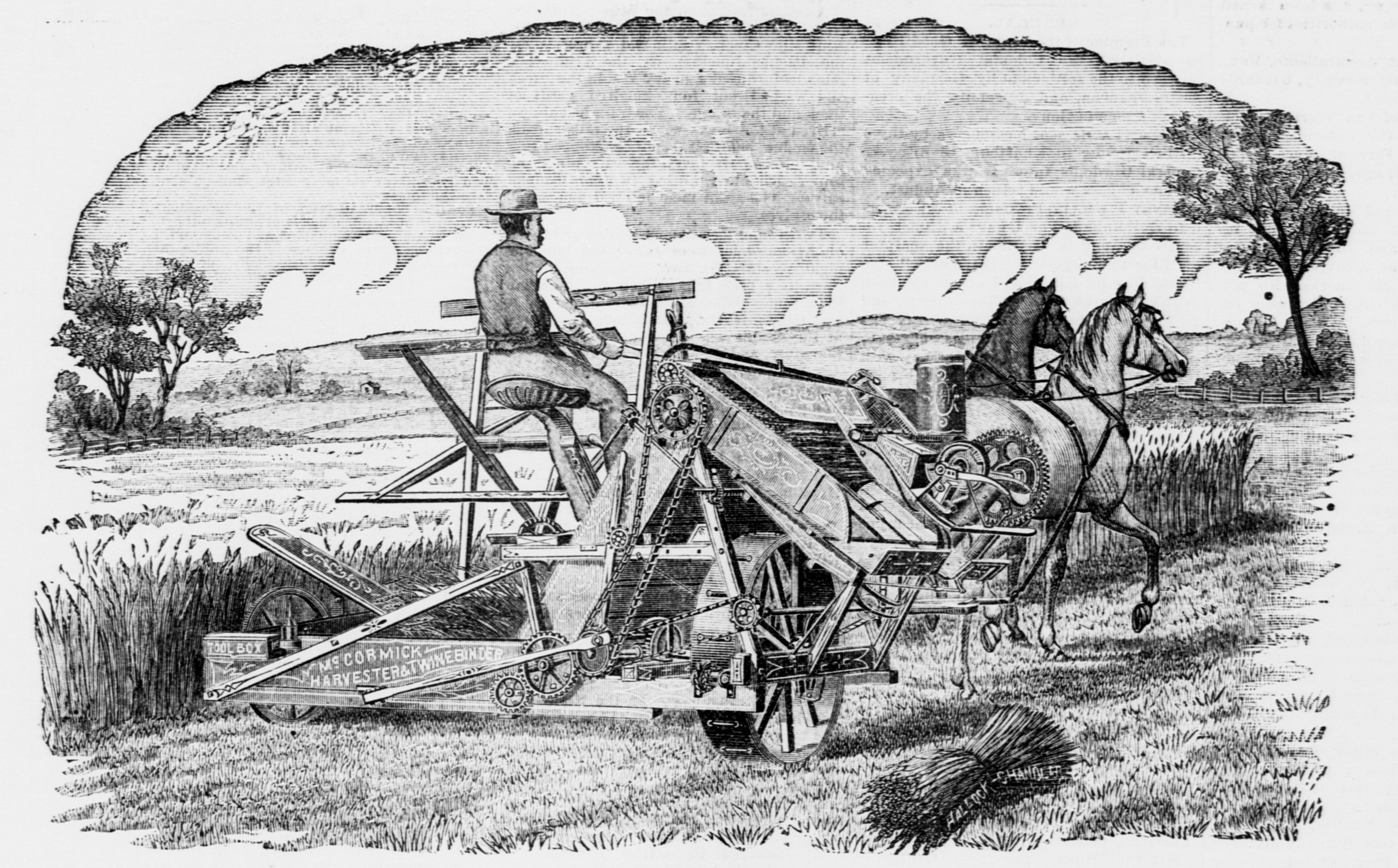
McCormick reaper and twine binder in 1884.

In the colonial era, wheat was sown by broadcasting, reaped by sickles, and threshed by flails. The kernels were then taken to a grist mill for grinding into flour. In 1830, it took four people and two oxen, working 10 hours a day, to produce 200 bushels. New technology greatly increased productivity in the 19th century, as sowing with drills replaced broadcasting, cradles took the place of sickles, and the cradles in turn were replaced by reapers and binders. Steam-powered threshing machines superseded flails. By 1895, in Bonanza farms in the Dakotas, it took six people and 36 horses pulling huge harvesters, working 10 hours a day, to produce 20,000 bushels. In the 1930s the gasoline powered "combine" combined reaping and threshing into one operation that took one person to operate. Production grew from 85 million bushels in 1839, 500 million in 1880, 600 million in 1900, and peaked at 1.0 billion bushels in 1915. Prices fluctuated erratically, with a downward trend in the 1890s that caused great distress in the Plains states.

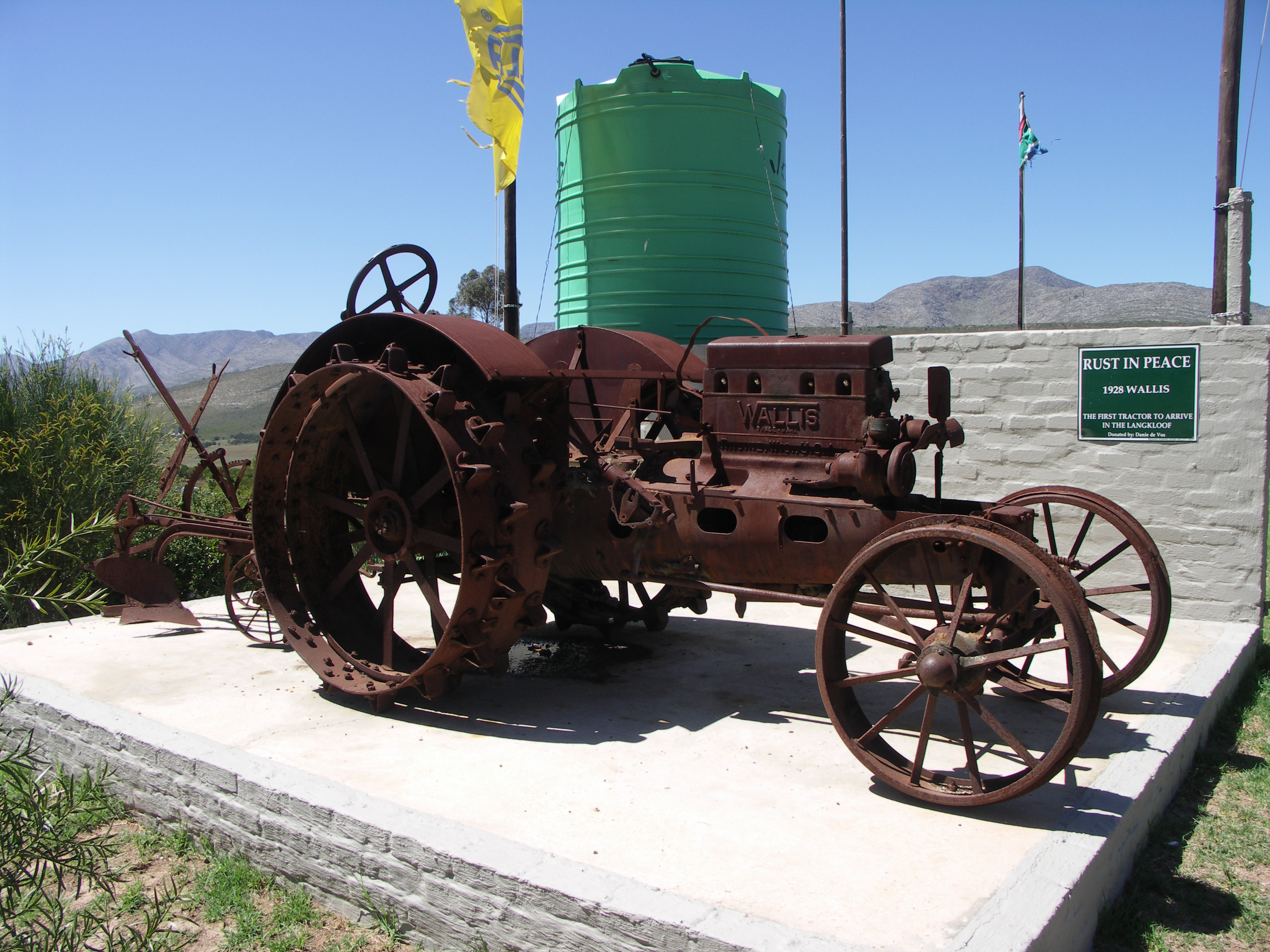
A 1928 Wallis tractor, near Joubertina in South Africa, made by Massey Ferguson.

The marketing of wheat was modernized as well, as the cost of transportation steadily fell and more and more distant markets opened up. Before 1850, the crop was sacked, shipped by wagon or canal boat, and stored in warehouses. With the rapid growth of the nation's railroad network in the 1850s–1870s, farmers took their harvest by wagon for sale to the nearest country elevators. The wheat moved to terminal elevators, where it was sold through grain exchanges to flour millers and exporters. Since the elevators and railroads generally had a local monopoly, farmers soon had targets besides the weather for their complaints. They sometimes accused the elevator men of undergrading, shortweighting, and excessive dockage. Scandinavian immigrants in the Midwest took control over marketing through the organization of cooperatives.

==== Varieties ====
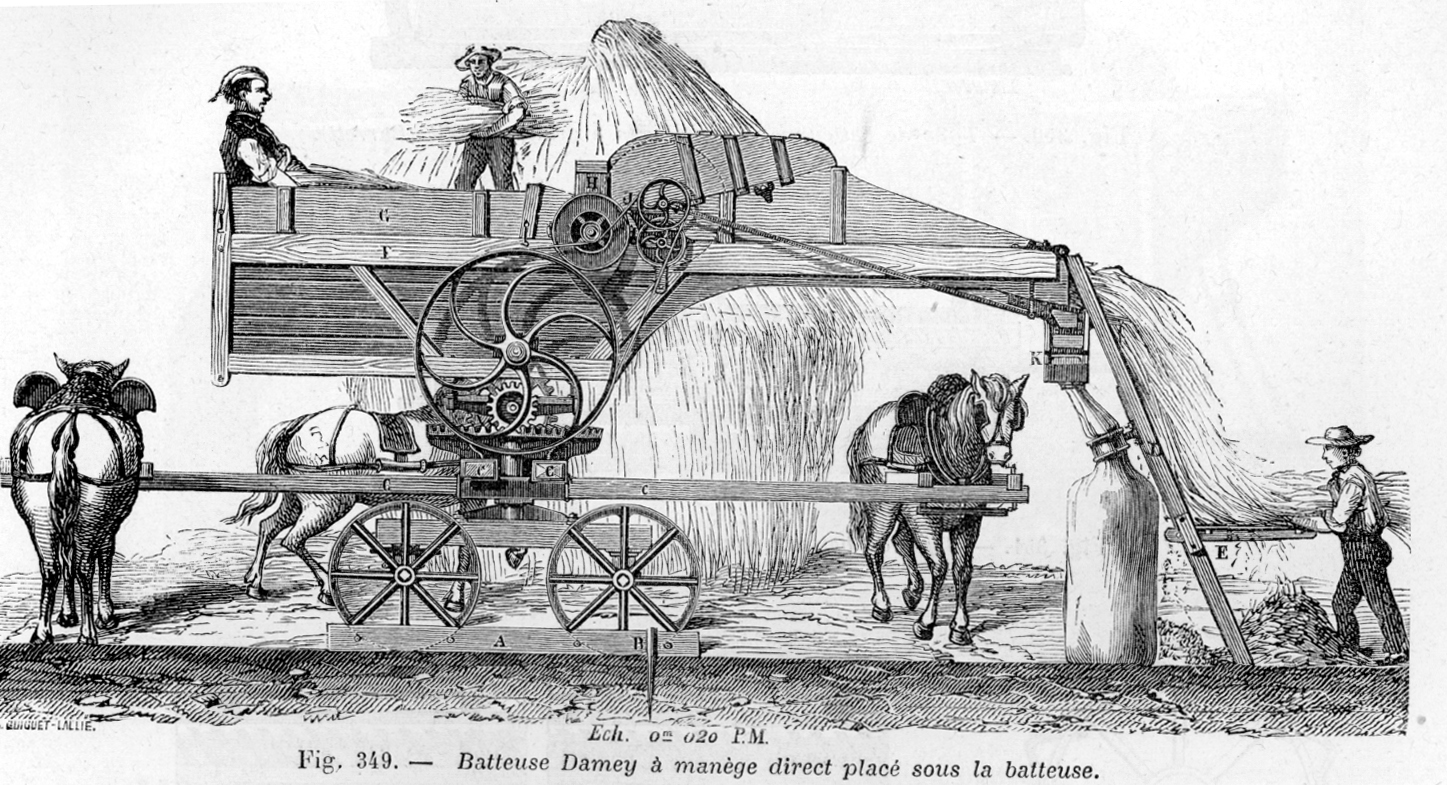
The horse-powered thresher; it removes the inedible chaff from the wheat kernels.

Following the invention of the steel roller mill in 1878, hard varieties of wheat such as Turkey Red became more popular than soft, which had been previously preferred because they were easier for grist mills to grind.

Wheat production witnessed major changes in varieties and cultural practices since 1870. Thanks to these innovations, vast expanses of the wheat belt now support commercial production, and yields have resisted the negative impact of insects, diseases, and weeds. Biological innovations contributed roughly half of labor-productivity growth between 1839 and 1909.

In the late 19th century, hardy new wheat varieties from the Russian steppes were introduced on the Great Plains by the Volga Germans who settled in North Dakota, Kansas, Montana and neighboring states. Legend credits the miller Bernhard Warkentin (1847–1908), a German Mennonite from Russia for introducing the "Turkey red" variety from Russia. More exactly, in the 1880s numerous millers and government agricultural agents worked to create "Turkey red" and make Kansas the "Wheat State". The U.S. Dept. of Agriculture, and the state experiment stations, have developed many new varieties, and taught farmers how to plant them. Similar varieties now dominate in the arid regions of the Great Plains.

==== Exports ====
Wheat farmers have always produced a surplus for export. The exports were small-scale until the 1860s, when bad crops in Europe, and lower costs due to cheaper railroads and ocean transport, opened the European markets to cheap American wheat. The British in particular depended on American wheat during the 1860s for a fourth of their food supply, making the government reluctant to risk a cutoff if it supported the Confederacy. By 1880, 150,000,000 bushels were exported to the value of $190,000,000. World War I saw large numbers of young European farmers conscripted into the armies, so Allied countries, particularly France and Italy depended on American shipments, which ranged from 100,000,000 to 260,000,000 bushels a year. American farmers reacted to the heavy demand and high prices by expanding their production, many taking out mortgages to buy out their neighbors farms. This led to a large surplus in the 1920s. The resulting low prices prompted growers to seek government support of prices, first through the McNary-Haugen bills, which failed in Congress, and later in the New Deal through the Agricultural Adjustment Act of 1933 and its many versions.

World War II brought an enormous expansion of production, topping off at a billion bushels in 1944. During the war and after large-scale wheat and flour exports were part of Lend Lease and the foreign assistance programs. In 1966 exports reached 860 million bushels of which 570 million were given away as food aid. A major drought in the Soviet Union in 1972 led to the sale of 390 million bushels and an agreement was assigned in 1975 under the détente policy to supply the Soviets with grain over a five-year period.

==== Marketing ====
By 1900 private grain exchanges settled the daily prices for North American wheat. Santon (2010) explains how the AAA programs set wheat prices in the U.S. after 1933, and the Canadians established a wheat board to do the same there. The Canadian government required prairie farmers to deliver all their grain to the Canadian Wheat Board (CWB), a single-selling-desk agency that supplanted private wheat marketing in western Canada. Meanwhile, the United States government subsidized farm incomes with domestic-use taxes and import tariffs, but otherwise preserved private wheat marketing.

=== Cotton ===
In the colonial era, small amounts of high quality long-staple cotton were produced in the Sea Islands off the coast of South Carolina. Inland, only short-staple cotton could be grown but it was full of seeds and very hard to process into fiber. The invention of the cotton gin in the late 1790s for the first time made short-staple cotton usable. It was generally produced on plantations ranging from South Carolina westward, with the work done by slaves. Simultaneously, the rapid growth of the Industrial Revolution in Britain, focused on textiles, created a major demand for the fiber. Cotton quickly exhausts the soil, so planters used their large profits to buy fresh land to the west, and purchase more slaves from the border states to operate their new plantations. After 1810, the emerging textile mills in New England also produced a heavy demand. By 1820, over 250,000 bales (of 500 pounds each) were exported to Europe, with a value of $22 million. By 1840, exports reached 1.5 million bales valued at $64 million, two thirds of all American exports. Cotton prices kept going up as the South remained the main supplier in the world. In 1860, the US shipped 3.5 million bales worth $192 million.

After the American Civil War, cotton production expanded to small farms, operated by white and black tenant farmers and sharecroppers. The quantity exported held steady, at 3,000,000 bales, but prices on the world market fell. Although there was some work involved in planting the seeds, and cultivating or holding out the weeds, the critical labor input for cotton was in the picking. How much a cotton operation could produce depended on how many hands (men women and children) were available. Finally in the 1950s, new mechanical harvesters allowed a handful of workers to pick as much as 100 had done before. The result was a large-scale exodus of the white and black cotton farmers from the south. By the 1970s, most cotton was grown in large automated farms in the Southwest.

== See also ==
- Agriculture in the United States
- Cotton production in the United States
- Corn production in the United States
- Environmental history of the United States
- History of the lumber industry in the United States
- Rural American history
- Urban–rural political divide#United States

== Bibliography ==
=== Surveys ===
- Rasmussen, Wayne D., and Douglas E. Bowers. A history of agricultural policy : chronological outline ( U.S. Department of Agriculture, National Agricultural Library, 1992) online
- Ardrey, Robert L, American agricultural implements: a review of invention and development in the agricultural implement industry of the United States (1894) online; a major comprehensive overview in 236 pages.
- Cochrane, Willard W. The Development of American Agriculture: A Historical Analysis (1993)
- Danbom, David B. Born in the Country: A History of Rural America (1997)
- Fite, Gilbert C. American Farmers: The New Minority (Indiana U. Press, 1981) online
- Goreham, Gary. Encyclopedia of rural America (Grey House Publishing, 2 vol 2008). 232 essays
- Gras, Norman. A history of agriculture in Europe and America, (1925). online edition
- Hart, John Fraser. The Changing Scale of American Agriculture. U. of Virginia Press, 2004. 320 pp.
- Hudson, John C., and Christopher R. Laingen. American Farms, American Food: A Geography of Agriculture and Food Production in the United States (Lexington Books, 2016)
- Hurt, R. Douglas. American Agriculture: A Brief History (2002)
- Mundlak, Yair. "Economic Growth: Lessons from Two Centuries of American Agriculture." Journal of Economic Literature 2005 43(4): 989–1024. JSTOR 4129381
- Ogle, Maureen. In meat we trust: An unexpected history of carnivore America (2013).
- Riney-Kehrberg, Pamela. ed. The Routledge History of Rural America (2018)
- Robert, Joseph C. The story of tobacco in America (1949) online edition
- Russell, Howard. A Long Deep Furrow: Three Centuries of Farming In New England (1981) online
- Schafer, Joseph. The social history of American agriculture (1936) online edition
- Schapsmeier, Edward L; and Frederick H. Schapsmeier. Encyclopedia of American agricultural history (1975) online
- Schlebecker John T. Whereby we thrive: A history of American farming, 1607–1972 (1972) online
- Skaggs, Jimmy M. Prime cut: Livestock raising and meatpacking in the United States, 1607-1983 (Texas A&M UP, 1986).
- Taylor, Carl C. The farmers' movement, 1620–1920 (1953) online edition
- Walker, Melissa, and James C. Cobb, eds. The New Encyclopedia of Southern Culture, vol. 11: Agriculture and Industry. (University of North Carolina Press, 2008) 354, pp. ISBN 978-0-8078-5909-4

=== Before 1775 ===
- Anderson, Virginia DeJohn, "Thomas Minor's World: Agrarian Life in Seventeenth-Century New England," Agricultural History, 82 (Fall 2008), 496–518.
- Bidwell, Percy and Falconer, John I. History of Agriculture in the Northern United States 1620–1860 (1941) online
- Galenson, David. "The Settlement and Growth of the Colonies," in Stanley L. Engerman and Robert E. Gallman (eds.), The Cambridge Economic History of the United States: Volume I, The Colonial Era (1996).
- Kulikoff, Allan. From British Peasants to Colonial American Farmers (1992) online
- Kulikoff, Allan. Tobacco and slaves: the development of southern cultures in the Chesapeake, 1680-1800 (1986) online
- McCusker, John J. ed. Economy of British America, 1607–1789 (1991), 540pp online
- Russell, Howard. A Long Deep Furrow: Three Centuries of Farming In New England (1981)
- Weeden, William Babcock Economic and Social History of New England, 1620–1789 (1891) 964 pages; online edition

=== 1775–1860 ===
==== North ====
- Bidwell, Percy and Falconer, John I. History of Agriculture in the Northern United States 1620–1860 (1941) online
- Gates, Paul W. The Farmers' Age: Agriculture, 1815–1860 (1960)
- Hutchinson, William T. (1930). Cyrus Hall McCormick: Seed-Time, 1809–1856. Vol. 1. Century Company. OCLC 6991369.; a standard scholarly history.
  - Hutchinson, William T. (1930). Cyrus Hall McCormick: Harvest, 1856–1884. Vol. 2. Century Company. OCLC 1651671.online
- Jones, Robert Leslie. History of agriculture in Ohio to 1880 (1983) online

==== South ====
- Baptist, Edward E. The Half Has Never Been Told: Slavery and the Making of American Capitalism. (Basic Books, 2014).
- Beckert, Sven, and Seth Rockman, eds. Slavery's Capitalism: A New History of American Economic Development (U of Pennsylvania Press, 2016).
- Craven, Avery Odelle. Soil exhaustion as a factor in the agricultural history of Virginia and Maryland, 1606–1860 (1926) online edition
- Gray, Lewis Cecil. History of Agriculture in the Southern United States to 1860. 2 vol (1933), classic in-depth history online edition
- Genovese, Eugene. Roll, Jordan Roll (1967), a famous study of plantation slavery.
- Genovese, Eugene. The Political Economy of Slavery: Studies in the Economy and the Society of the Slave South (Vintage, 1967)
- Jewett, Clayton E., and John O. Allen. Slavery in the South: A State-By-State History (Greenwood Press, 2004)
- Kulikoff, Alan. Tobacco and Slaves: The Development of Southern Cultures in the Chesapeake, 1680–1800 (U of North Carolina Press, 1986).
- Logan, Trevon D. "American Enslavement and the Recovery of Black Economic History." Journal of Economic Perspectives 36.2 (2022): 81–98. online
- Morgan, Edmund S. American Slavery, American Freedom: The Ordeal of Colonial Virginia (W.W. Norton, 1975).
- Olmstead, Alan L., and Paul W. Rhode, "Biological Innovation and Productivity Growth in the Antebellum Cotton Economy," Journal of Economic History, 68 (Dec. 2008), 1123–71.
- Phillips, Ulrich B. "The Origin and Growth of the Southern Black Belts." American Historical Review, 11 (July, 1906): 798–816. in JSTOR
- Scarborough, William K. The Overseer: Plantation Management in the Old South (1984)
- Schermerhorn, Calvin. The Business of Slavery and the Rise of American Capitalism, 1815–1860 (Yale UP, 2015).

=== 1860-present, national ===
- Cyclopedia of American agriculture; a popular survey of agricultural conditions, ed by L. H. Bailey, 4 vol 1907–1909. online edition highly useful compendium.
- Bosso, Christopher J. Framing the Farm Bill: Interests, Ideology, and Agricultural Act of 2014 (University Press of Kansas, 2017).
- Brunner, Edmund de Schweinitz. Rural social trends (1933) online edition
- Conkin, Paul K. A Revolution Down on the Farm: The Transformation of American Agriculture since 1929 (2009) excerpt and text search
- Dahlstrom, Neil. Tractor Wars - John Deere, Henry Ford, International Harvester, and the Birth of Modern Agriculture (2022)
- Dean, Virgil W. An Opportunity Lost: The Truman Administration and the Farm Policy Debate. U. of Missouri Press, 2006. 275 pp.
- Friedberger, Mark. Farm Families and Change in 20th Century America (2014)
- Gardner, Bruce L. "Changing Economic Perspectives on the Farm Problem." Journal of Economic Literature (1992) 30#1 62–101. in JSTOR
- Gardner, Bruce L. American Agriculture in the Twentieth Century: How it Flourished and What it Cost (Harvard UP, 2002).
- Gates, Paul W. Agriculture and the Civil War (1985) online
- Gee, Wilson. The place of agriculture in American life (1930) online edition
- Haystead, Ladd, and Fite, Gilbert C. The Agricultural Regions of the United States (1955) online
- Lord, Russell. The Wallaces of Iowa (1947) online edition
- Lyon-Jenness, Cheryl. "Planting a seed: the nineteenth-century horticultural boom in America." Business History Review 78.3 (2004): 381–421.
- Mayer, Oscar Gottfried. America's meat packing industry; a brief survey of its development and economics. (1939) online edition
- McCormick, Cyrus (1931). The century of the reaper; an account of Cyrus Hall McCormick, the inventor. Houghton Mifflin Company.
- Mullendore, William Clinton. History of the United States Food Administration, 1917–1919 (1941) online edition
- Nourse, Edwin Griswold. Three years of the Agricultural Adjustment Administration (1937) online edition
- Perren, Richard, "Farmers and Consumers under Strain: Allied Meat Supplies in the First World War," Agricultural History Review (Oxford), 53 (part II, 2005), 212–28.
- Sanderson, Ezra Dwight. Research memorandum on rural life in the depression (1937) online edition
- Schultz, Theodore W. (1945). Agriculture in an Unstable Economy. Archived from the original on 2012-10-20 – via Questia.
- Shannon, Fred Albert. Farmer's Last Frontier: Agriculture, 1860–1897 (1945) online edition comprehensive survey
- Wilcox, Walter W. The farmer in the second world war (1947) online edition
- Zulauf, Carl, and David Orden. "80 Years of Farm Bills – Evolutionary Reform." Choices (2016) 31#4 pp. 1–7 online

=== 1860-present, regional studies ===
- Cyclopedia of American agriculture; a popular survey of agricultural conditions, ed by L. H. Bailey, 4 vol 1907–1909. online edition highly useful compendium
- Black, John D. The Rural Economy of New England: A regional study (1950) online edition
- Cannon, Brian Q., "Homesteading Remembered: A Sesquicentennial Perspective," Agricultural History, 87 (Winter 2013), 1–29.
- Clawson, Marion. The Western range livestock industry, (1950) online edition
- Dale, Edward Everett. The range cattle industry (1930) online edition
- Danbom, David B. Sod Busting: How families made farms on the 19th-century Plains (2014)
- Fite, Gilbert C. The Farmers' Frontier: 1865–1900 (1966), the west
- Fite, Gilbert C. Cotton Fields No More: Southern Agriculture, 1865–1980 (1984)
- Freeman, John F. and Mark E. Uchanski. Adapting to the Land: A History of Agriculture in Colorado (University Press of Colorado, 2022) online
- Friedberger, Mark. "The Transformation of the Rural Midwest, 1945–1985," Old Northwest, 1992, Vol. 16 Issue 1, pp. 13–36
- Friedberger, Mark W. "Handing Down the Home Place: Farm Inheritance Strategies in Iowa" Annals of Iowa 47.6 (1984): 518–36. online
- Friedberger, Mark. "The Farm Family and the Inheritance Process: Evidence from the Corn Belt, 1870–1950." Agricultural History 57.1 (1983): 1–13. uses Iowa census and sales data
- Friedberger, Mark. Shake-Out: Iowa Farm Families in the 1980s (1989)
- Fry, John J. " 'Good Farming-Clear Thinking-Right Living': Midwestern Farm Newspapers, Social Reform, and Rural Readers in the Early Twentieth Century." Agricultural History (2004): 34–49.
- Gisolfi, Monica Richmond, "From Crop Lien to Contract Farming: The Roots of Agribusiness in the American South, 1929–1939," Agricultural History, 80 (Spring 2006), 167–89.
- Hahn, Barbara, "Paradox of Precision: Bright Tobacco as Technology Transfer, 1880–1937," Agricultural History, 82 (Spring 2008), 220–35.
- Ham, George E. and Robin Higham, eds. The Rise of the Wheat State: A History of Kansas Agriculture, 1861- 1986 (1987) 16 topical essays by experts. online
- Hurt, R. Douglas. "The Agricultural and Rural History of Kansas." Kansas History 2004 27(3): 194–217. ISSN 0149-9114 Fulltext: in Ebsco
- Larson, Henrietta M. The wheat market and the farmer in Minnesota, 1858–1900 (1926). online edition
- MacCurdy, Rahno Mabel. The history of the California Fruit Growers Exchange (1925). online edition
- Miner, Horace Mitchell. Culture and agriculture; an anthropological study of a corn belt county (1949) online edition
- Nordin, Dennis S. and Scott, Roy V. From Prairie Farmer to Entrepreneur: The Transformation of Midwestern Agriculture. Indiana U. Press, 2005. 356 pp.
- Rikoon, J. Sanford. Threshing in the Midwest, 1820-1940: A Study of Traditional Culture and Technological Change (Indiana University Press, 1988). online
- Sackman, Douglas Cazaux. Orange Empire: California and the Fruits of Eden (2005)
- Saloutos, Theodore. "Southern Agriculture and the Problems of Readjustment: 1865–1877," Agricultural history (April, 1956) Vol 30#2 58–76 online edition
- Sawers, Larry. "The Mule, the South, and Economic Progress." Social Science History 2004 28(4): 667–90. ISSN 0145-5532 Fulltext: in Project Muse and Ebsco

=== Environmental issues ===
- Craven, Avery Odelle. Soil Exhaustion as a Factor in the Agricultural History of Virginia and Maryland, 1606–1860 (1925)
- Cronon, William. Changes in the Land, Revised Edition: Indians, Colonists, and the Ecology of New England (2nd ed. 2003), excerpt and text search
- Cunfer, Geoff. On the Great Plains: Agriculture and Environment. (2005). 240 pp.
- McLeman, Robert, "Migration Out of 1930s Rural Eastern Oklahoma: Insights for Climate Change Research," Great Plains Quarterly, 26 (Winter 2006), 27–40.
- Majewski, John, and Viken Tchakerian, "The Environmental Origins of Shifting Cultivation: Climate, Soils, and Disease in the Nineteenth-Century U.S. South," Agricultural History, 81 (Fall 2007), 522–49.
- Melosi, Martin V., and Charles Reagan Wilson, eds. The New Encyclopedia of Southern Culture: Volume 8: Environment (v. 8) (2007)
- Miner, Craig. Next Year Country: Dust to Dust in Western Kansas, 1890–1940 (2006) 371 pp. ISBN 0-7006-1476-1
- Silver, Timothy. A New Face on the Countryside: Indians, Colonists, and Slaves in South Atlantic Forests, 1500–1800 (1990) excerpt and text search
- Urban, Michael A., "An Uninhabited Waste: Transforming the Grand Prairie in Nineteenth Century Illinois, U.S.A.," Journal of Historical Geography, 31 (Oct. 2005), 647–65.

=== Historiography ===
- Atack, Jeremy. "A Nineteenth-century Resource for Agricultural History Research in the Twenty-first Century." Agricultural History 2004 78(4): 389–412. ISSN 0002-1482 Fulltext: in University of California Journals and Ebsco. Large database of individual farmers from manuscript census.
- Bogue, Allan G. "Tilling Agricultural History with Paul Wallace Gates and James C. Malin." Agricultural History 2006 80(4): 436–60. ISSN 0002-1482 Fulltext: in Ebsco
- Edwards, Everett Eugene (1970), A bibliography of the history of agriculture in the United States, B. Franklin, ISBN 978-0-8337-1002-4
- Levins, Richard A. Willard Cochrane and the American Family Farm (University of Nebraska Press, 2000.) 88p
- Peters, Scott J. "'Every Farmer Should Be Awakened': Liberty Hyde Bailey's Vision of Agricultural Extension Work." Agricultural History (2006): 190–219. online
- Schmidt, Louis Bernard, and Earle Dudley Ross, eds. Readings in the economic history of american agriculture (Macmillan, 1925) excerpts from scholarly studies, colonial era to 1920s. online.

=== Primary sources and statistics ===
- Bruchey, Stuart, ed. Cotton in the Growth of the American Economy: 1790–1860 (1967)
- Carter, Susan, at al. eds. The Historical Statistics of the United States (Cambridge U.P. 2006), 6 vol.; online in many academic libraries; 105 tables on agriculture
- Fitch, Charles H. "The Manufacture of Agricultural Implements" in "Report on the Manufactures of Interchangeable Mechanism" in 1880 Census: Volume 2. Report on the Manufactures of the United States (1881) pp. 70-85; detailed statistics of agricultural machines, by city and state for 1880 and previous censuses. online
- Phillips, Ulrich B. ed. Plantation and Frontier Documents, 1649–1863; Illustrative of Industrial History in the Colonial and Antebellum South: Collected from MSS. and Other Rare Sources. 2 Volumes. (1909). online vol 1.
- Rasmussen, Wayne D., ed. Agriculture in the United States: a documentary history (4 vol, Random House, 1975) 3661pp. vol 4 online
- Rhode, Robert T. Harvest Story Recollections of Old-Time Threshermen (Purdue UP, 2001), primary sources
- Schmidt, Louis Bernard. ed. Readings in the economic history of American agriculture (1925) online edition
- Sorokin, Pitirim et al., eds. A Systematic Sourcebook in Rural Sociology (3 vol. 1930), 2000 pages of primary sources and commentary; worldwide coverage
