= Jörg Baten =

German economic historian

Jörg Baten (born 24 June 1965 in Hamburg) is a German economic historian. He is the former President of the European Historical Economics Society, current co-Editor-in-chief of Economics and Human Biology and is currently a professor of economic history at the University of Tübingen.

== Life ==
Baten received his doctorate from LMU Munich with his work about the biological standard of living in South Germany, under supervision of John Komlos. Since 2001, he holds the chair of economic history at the University of Tübingen. In 2005 he was invited as a visiting professor at Yale University (Dept. Political Science) and was visiting professor at Pompeu Fabra University of Barcelona in 2006/07. Since 2006, Baten has also been the Secretary General of the International Economic History Association.

== Work ==
Baten's scientific work focuses on four big themes: the long-run development of education and human capital in global perspective, the econometric history of firms and innovations, the study of welfare development and growth in economies around the world, and the determinants and effects of interpersonal violence. Further focal points of his research include (gender) inequality, Africa and Latin America. In his research on education, Baten mostly uses age heaping as an indicator of numeracy, which he is an expert in. His most important and influential works include a comprehensive work on the history of the global economy and a volume on Health, Diet, Work and Violence in Europe, both of which he (co-)edited.

Baten achieved prominence with his works about the long term development of human capital and living standards. In a global project he and his colleagues studied trends of numerical skills over centuries. As an indicator for numeracy, the share of people being able to state their exact age was used, as well as consumption statistics of books. Baten drew the conclusion that early development of education in some countries caused today's differences between poor and rich, whereas world trade played a rather marginal role.

Baten studied the history of health and nutrition in Europe since the ancient world and in joint work with other junior scholars, he explored other world regions such as Africa, the Middle East and Latin America using methods of anthropometric history. One fundamental result of his research is that the health of historical populations depends on agricultural characteristics. A specialisation of animal husbandry, for example, reduces the catastrophic insufficiency of protein and calcium in preindustrial societies.

In 2020, Baten analysed, jointly with Thomas Keywood, new evidence on elite human capital formation in Europe over a time period from the 6th to the 20th century. The focus on this study lies on tracing early roots of the Great Divergence of Europe. They find a substantial relationship between elite numeracy and elite violence, and conclude that violence had a detrimental impact on human capital formation. Their study provides evidence that the disparities in violence between Eastern and Western Europe helped shape the divergent movement via the elite numeracy mechanism and had substantial implications for the economic fortunes of each region over the following centuries.

Several of Batens' doctoral and post-doctoral students have proceeded to pursue an academic career.

From 2015 to 2017, Baten was appointed president of the European Historical Economics Society, a learned society of European economic historians. Furthermore, he has been co-editor-in-chief of the scientific journal Economics and Human Biology since 2015.

== Books ==
- Baten, Joerg; International Economic History Association (2016). A history of the global economy : from 1500 to the present. Cambridge. ISBN 978-1-107-10470-9. OCLC 914156941.
- Steckel, Richard H.; Larsen, Clark Spencer; Roberts, Charlotte A.; Baten, Joerg (2019). The backbone of Europe : health, diet, work and violence over two millennia. Cambridge, United Kingdom. ISBN 978-1-108-37983-0. OCLC 1066141780.
