= Richard H. Steckel =

Economic historian

Academic background
- Education: Oberlin College (A.B., 1966); University of Oklahoma (M.A., 1970); University of Chicago (M.A., 1973; Ph.D., 1977)
- Doctoral advisor: Robert Fogel

Academic work
- Discipline: Economics
- Institutions: Ohio State University; National Bureau of Economic Research
- Notable ideas: Economic history
- Website: Information at IDEAS / RePEc

Richard Hall Steckel (born 28 June 1944, died 31 March 2026) is an American economist with a focus on economic history. Steckel is the SBS Distinguished Professor of Economics, Anthropology and History at Ohio State University (OSU) and a research associate at the National Bureau of Economic Research (NBER). He is well known for his work on health and well-being, in which he is a major contributor to anthropometric history along with John Komlos. Their work was highlighted in a 1996 Time magazine front page article. Between 2004 and 2005, he served as president of the Social Science History Association.

Steckel earned an A.B. in economics at Oberlin College in 1966, M.A.s in economics and mathematics at the University of Oklahoma (OU) in 1970, an M.A. and a Ph.D. in economics at the University of Chicago in 1973 and 1977, respectively. He began as an instructor in economics at OSU in 1974, became an assistant professor in 1981, was promoted to professor in 1989, and was named SBS Distinguished Professor in 2004. He is a research associate of NBER since 1982 and serves the Conference on Research on Income and Wealth since 1989. He has served as a visiting fellow at All Souls College, Oxford; the London School of Economics; LMU Munich; Flinders University of South Australia, and Harvard University.

== Selected publications ==
- Steckel, Richard H. and Jerome C. Rose (eds.) (2002). The Backbone of History: Health and Nutrition in the Western Hemisphere. New York: Cambridge University Press.
- Haines, Michael and Richard H. Steckel (eds.) (2000). A Population History of North America. New York: Cambridge University Press.
- Steckel, Richard H. and Roderick Floud (eds.) (1997). Health and Welfare during Industrialization. Chicago: University of Chicago Press.
- Steckel, Richard H. (1985). The Economics of U.S. Slave and Southern White Fertility. New York: Garland Press.

== See also ==
- Auxology
- Social determinants of health
