= Knemometry =

Medical measurement

Knemometry (Greek: η κνημη, romanized: i knimi, lit. 'the lower leg') is the medical term for measuring the distance between knee and heel of a sitting child or adolescent using a technical device, the knemometer. Knemometric measurements show a measurement error of less than 160 μm (0.16 mm) and enable illustrating growth at intervals of few weeks (short-term growth).

== The device ==
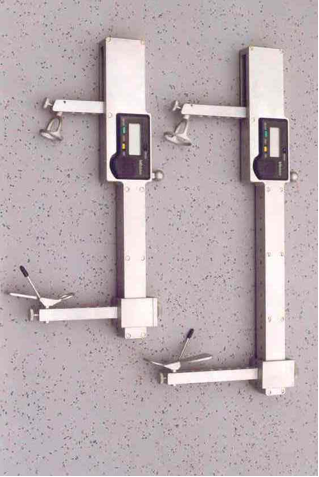
A mini knemometer to measure infants' lower legs

Ignaz Maria Valk developed this technique in 1983 in Nijmegen/Netherlands. It is being practiced since and used for basic research in growth and the treatment of growth disorders. Hermanussen introduced the mini-knemometer for accurate growth measurements of prematures and newborn infants. Mini-knemometry determines the lower leg length with an accuracy of less than 100 μm (0.1 mm). This enables substantiating growth within 24 hours. In an animal model, the technique was used to investigate the effects of steroids and growth hormone on short-term growth. These studies were an important prerequisite for improving growth therapies.

== The measurement of short-term growth ==
The auxological term "short-term growth" denotes growth characteristics that become evident when measurements are being performed within intervals of less than one year (e.g. monthly, weekly or even daily). Mainly knemometry has been used for this purpose, but also very frequent measurements using conventional devices for height measurements.

Short-term growth consists of small growth spurts (mini growth spurts). In the human neonate, these spurts occur at intervals of 2 to 10 days, and they reach maximum velocities of up to 0.2 mm per hour at the lower leg. Growth hormone therapies have been shown to significantly alter the dynamics of short-term growth. Catch-up growth (compensatory growth after periods of growth impairment due to illness, starvation and other unfavourable conditions) is characterised by repetitive series of broadened mini growth spurts.
