= Anthropologischer Anzeiger =

- Discipline: Anthropology
- Language: English
- Edited by: Frank J. Rühli; Michael Hermanussen; Albert Zink

Publication details
- History: 1924–present
- Publisher: E. Schweizerbart
- Frequency: Quarterly
- Impact factor: 0.866 (2017)

Standard abbreviations
- ISO 4: Anthropol. Anz.

Indexing
- ISSN: 0003-5548 (print); 2363-7099 (web)
- LCCN: 59046584
- OCLC no.: 851320587

Links
- Journal homepage; Online access; Online archive

Anthropologischer Anzeiger: Journal of Biological and Clinical Anthropology is a quarterly peer-reviewed scientific journal covering biological and medical anthropology. It was established in 1924 by Rudolf Martin. It is published by E. Schweizerbart and the editors-in-chief are Frank J. Rühli (University of Zurich), Michael Hermanussen, and Albert Zink (Institute for Mummies and the Iceman). According to the Journal Citation Reports, the journal has a 2017 impact factor of 0.866.
