= Black Belt (geological formation) =

Geological formation in the Southeastern United States

The Black Belt in physical geography is a roughly crescent-shaped geological formation of dark fertile soil in the Southern United States. It is about 300 miles (480 km) long and up to 25 miles (40 km) wide in c. east–west orientation, mostly in central Alabama and northeast Mississippi.

During the Cretaceous period, about 145 to 66 million years ago, most of what are now the central plains and the Southeastern United States were covered by shallow seas. Tiny marine plankton grew in those seas, and their carbonate skeletons accumulated into massive chalk formations. That chalk eventually became a fertile soil, highly suitable for growing crops. The Black Belt arc was the shoreline of one of those seas, where large amounts of chalk had collected in the shallow waters.

== History ==
Before the 19th century, this region was a mosaic of prairies and oak–hickory forest.

In the 1820s and 1830s, the region was identified as prime land for upland cotton plantations. Short-staple cotton did well here, and its profitable processing was made possible by invention of the cotton gin. It grew better in the upland regions than the long-staple cotton of the Low Country.

=== Socioeconomic region ===
After 1865, Black Belt was sometimes used to describe a geopolitical region, much as the terms Snow Belt, Rust Belt, Sun Belt, and Bible Belt are used today. Booker T. Washington wrote in his 1901 autobiography

I have often been asked to define the term "Black Belt". So far as I can learn, the term was first used to designate a part of the country which was distinguished by the colour of the soil. The part of the country possessing this thick, dark, and naturally rich soil was, of course, the part of the South where the slaves were most profitable, and consequently they were taken there in the largest numbers. Later, and especially since the war, the term seems to be used wholly in a political sense—that is, to designate the counties where the black people outnumber the white.

Since the 1920s the term Black Belt fell out of favor as a term outside of the specialized field of physical geology, but various authors have written about the fact that the Black Belt geographical formation contained a large number of slaves before the American Civil War, many of whom worked the cotton plantations. Some publications still use the phrase to refer to the geopolitical region.
