= Anthropometric history =

Study of the history of human height and weight

Anthropometric history is the study of the history of human height and weight. The concept was formulated in 1989 although it has historical roots. In the 1830s, Adolphe Quetelet and Louis R. Villermé studied the physical stature of populations. In the 1960s, French historians analyzed the relationship between socio-economic variables and human height. Anthropometric history was established as field of study in the late 1970s when economic historians Robert Fogel, John Komlos, Richard Steckel and other academics began to study the history of human physical stature and its relationship to economic development. A branch of cliometrics, it uses trends and cross-sectional patterns in human physical stature to understand historical processes.

== See also ==
- History of anthropometry
- Cliometrics
- Economics and Human Biology
- Antebellum Puzzle
