= Louis-René Villermé =

French economist and physician

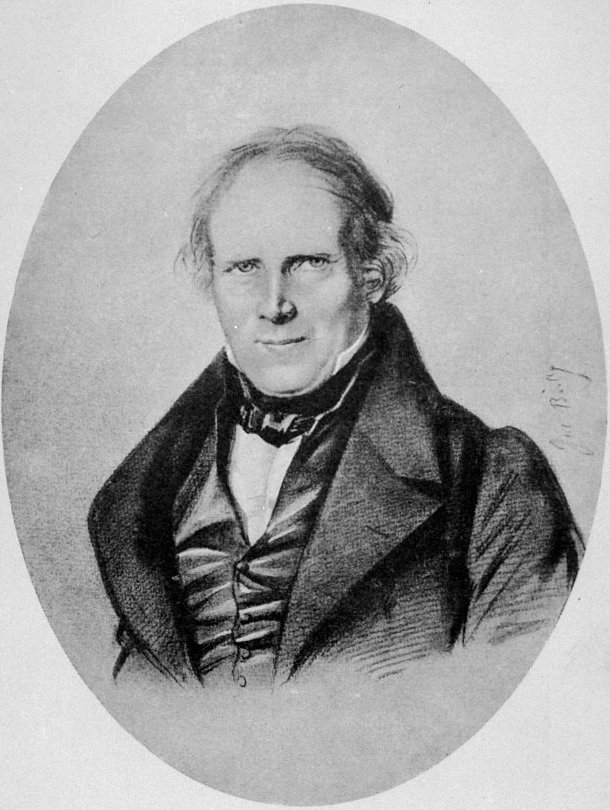
- Portrait of Louis-René Villermé by Louis-Léopold Boilly
- Born: 10 March 1782; Paris, France
- Died: 16 November 1863 (aged 81); Paris, France
- Scientific career
- Fields: Medicine, Social epidemiology, Sociology, Hygienic reform

Louis-René Villermé (10 March 1782 – 16 November 1863) was a French economist and medical doctor. He was known for his early studies of social epidemiology, or the effects of socioeconomic status on health, in early industrial France, and was an advocate for hygienic reform in factories and prisons. His work is considered pivotal in the history of the fields of sociology and statistical inquiry, and he is considered a founder of epidemiology.

Villermé published works on the conditions in prisons in France, and the benefits of helping prisoners return to outside life when their sentences ended. Another concerned the role of industrialization on the general health and quality of life of working-class people. His best-known work was concerned with workers in the cotton, wool, and silk industries, including the children that worked in the mills.

== Career ==
Born in Paris on 10 March 1782, Villermé was a man of many occupations; he covered a wide range of professions in his lifetime including: medical student, army surgeon, author, social economist, and member of several medical boards. He studied with the anatomist Guillaume Dupuytren during 1801–1804. Villermé then spent 10 years serving in the army room during 1804–1814 under the reign of Napoleon. In 1819, Villermé married. After his military service, he began work as Secretary-General of the Société Médicale d'Emulation in 1818. Villermé was elected to the Académie royale de médecine in 1823.

Later in life, he became an economist who wrote about social issues. Villermé was one of the pioneering advocates of hygienic reform and one of the first in France to relate hygienic reform with that of social reform. He conducted numerous early studies on social epidemiology, the health disparities among classes in correlation with wages and living conditions, using his knowledge as a physician to incorporate data analysis as well as social investigations of the working class. He even conducted studies that related mortality rates with income. He was described by Belgian polymath Adolphe Quetelet as "one of the men who has thrown most light upon this important subject." He is considered one of the founders of epidemiology.

Villermé was responsible for the establishment in 1829 of what may have been the first journal of urban studies, Annales d'hygiène publique et de médecine légale (Annals of Public Hygiene and Forensic Medicine, 1829). As one of its editors, he advocated for the use of statistics as a tool, and published the works of statisticians from France and other countries. In addition to being a member of the Académie royale de médecine, Villermé was a member of the Académie des Sciences Morales et Politiques after it was reestablished in 1832. He was appointed by it to lead a commission into textile workers, and served as its president. His work is considered pivotal in the history of the fields of sociology and statistical inquiry,

Politically, Villermé was a liberal, with an optimistic belief that industrialism and haut commerce could be sources of "productive" wealth which would improve public health. In terms of political economy, he generally did not support government intervention or regulation, believing that a healthy private sector would self-regulate and that enlightened employers would provide higher wages. He did not adopt a radical or proletarian view focused on class relations and political organizing.

However, in the area of child labor, Villermé was an active supporter of government intervention. He strongly advocated against child labor and for the required education of young children, positions that influenced the passage of comprehensive French child labor legislation in 1841.

If following my tour a maximum duration of work for children in factories should be adopted, I would certainly be well rewarded for all my trouble... This law, which would only be a copy of one passed in England not long ago, is absolutely demanded by conscience and humanity.

== Works ==
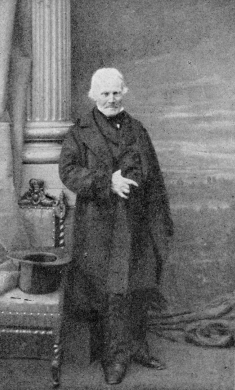
Louis-René Villermé at the age of 78, in 1860 or 1861

=== On Prisons ===
Villermé published Des prisons telles qu'elles sont et telles qu'elles devraient être (On Prisons as They Are and as They Should Be) in 1820. In this work he called attention to the unhealthy conditions of the prisons in Paris. He outlined several components of the prison systems that he believed should be abolished including torture, ill treatment, cells, and unequal treatment of prisoners based on the amount of money men are able to give up. Villermé urged the government of Paris to take after the newly reformed prison systems of the United States and Russia. His goal was to persuade officials to reevaluate the unhealthy living environments and treatments of men in prisons so that men are able to become functioning citizens upon their release. This work in particular reflects the multifaceted approach Villermé took in his research, combining knowledge of medicine, data analysis, and social epidemiology.

In the year 1826, he conducted a study connecting mortality rates with wealth and poverty based on neighborhoods in Paris. Louis-René Villermé is also accounted as the author of one of the first life expectancy tables that directly linked income to mortality rates and life expectancy. He concluded that poor people die younger. This extended into his study in 1829 that reasoned the cause for shorter heights in poorer people was the result of inadequate money to provide proper nutrition. Villermé's work on height is considered the first study in auxological epidemiology.

=== Tableau ===
Villermé’s Tableau discussed the role of industrialization on the general health and quality of life for the laboring class. His perspective in this work is unique in that he maintained that the process of industrialization is not completely to blame. He even suggested the industrial movement to be beneficial for the future of society, calling on examples of industrialization in the United States. He also discussed the role of children working in the textile industry. The point is made that, in some cases, at least half of the workforce in a textile factory was made up of the children of textile workers, many under the age of eighteen. Villermé contrasted the quality of life of workers who maintained family life with those taken over completely by their labor. He blamed both the working conditions associated with industrialization as well as the workers themselves to an extent. This work served not only as valuable information to medical institutions and boards, but also as a social statement, widely accepted by the public. It is from this work that Villermé received his reputation as a moral economist.

=== The Physical Condition of Cotton, Wool and Silk Workers ===
His most popular work was that of Tableau de l'état physique et moral des ouvriers employés dans les manufactures de coton, de laine et de soie (Study of the Physical Condition of Cotton, Wool and Silk workers), the final product of extended research and observation, published in the year 1840. The book outlined the physical and moral conditions of different labor forces. Villermé discussed his observations made concerning workers in the cotton, wool, and silk industries. He brought attention to the treacherous working conditions, unfit for adults as well as the danger for young children working alongside the adults, and critiqued the low wages provided to workers. There was a comparison throughout the entirety of the first section between the three occupations and different locations throughout France. The second portion of the book included the topic of health as it relates to dangerous workplaces and the effects of low pay and overcrowding. and he is considered a founder of epidemiology. Villermé covered a wide array of subject matter including: children in the workplace, savings accounts, asylum rooms, and drunkenness among the working class. The work was unique in combining health topics with research and social reforms.
