= Michael Hermanussen =

German pediatrician (born 1955)

Michael Hermanussen (born 26 April 1955 in Hamburg) is a German pediatrician and professor at the University of Kiel. He is known for his work on growth and nutrition.

== Life ==
Hermanussen studied medicine and worked as a pediatrician at the University of Kiel from 1982 until 1989. He investigated growth and child development (auxology) and first described mini growth spurts. Since 1990 he cooperates in international joint projects with scientists and also works in a general pediatric office. He organizes national and international meetings on growth and nutrition. From 2003 to 2011 he was a member of the scientific board of the German society for Anthropology. Together with Christiane Scheffler he edits ”Human Biology and Public Health”. He is the founder of the Auxological Society.

== Scientific Work ==
Hermanussen developed new mathematical methods for improved diagnostics of growth disorders and a new technique for estimating final adult height. He developed mini-knemometry, a new and accurate technique for growth measurements in children. This device determines the lower leg length at an accuracy that growth becomes measurable within a few days. In addition he developed a similar technology for measuring growth in rats within intervals of a few hours. This technology was important for the better understanding of the effects of growth hormone. His investigations resulted in a significant improvement of growth hormone therapies. For the first time, Hermanussen showed that anorexia nervosa patients do not only stop growing they even can shrink.

Since 2002 he works in nutrition and obesity, with particular respect to monosodium glutamate on appetite regulation. During this project Hermanussen showed for the first time that convenience food contains neurotransmitters. In the global debate on the causes of stunting, he argues that stunting is not a synonym of malnutrition, but is socially conditioned. Together with Prof. Christiane Scheffler, he is investigating the influence of the social environment on the growth of children and adolescents and the significance of height as a social signal. Hermanussen and Scheffler were the first to demonstrate that the secular trend toward greater body height cannot be adequately explained by physical circumstances such as wealth, health, and diet alone, but occurs particularly following the collapse of rigid political systems and during periods of political uncertainty.
