= Yair Mundlak =

Israeli-American economist (1927–2015)

Yair Mundlak (Hebrew: יאיר מונדלק; 1927 - October 20, 2015) was an Israeli-American economist. He was a former professor at the University of Chicago and Hebrew University of Jerusalem.

He is known for an influential 1961 article in the Journal of Farm Economics wherein he introduced a fixed effects estimator to better estimate agricultural productivity. His research would influence research designs in economics, contributing to the popularity of difference-in-differences designs and two-way fixed effects estimators.

He was born in Pinsk, Poland (now Belarus) in 1927. In the lead-up to World War II, Mundlak moved with his family to the area that is today Israel, but was the British Mandate at the time. He attended Kadoorie Agricultural High School in Lower Galilee. He was a soldier in the 1948 Arab-Israeli War. After the war, he joined a kibbutz.

Mundlak moved to the United States to study agricultural economics at College of Agriculture at Davis (now University of California-Davis). He earned a BSc in Agricultural Economics at Davis in 1953. He joined University of Berkeley where he graduated with a MS in Statistics in 1956 and a PhD in Agricultural Economics in 1957. After earning his PhD, he joined the faculty of the Hebrew University of Jerusalem.

== Personal life ==
He was married and had three children.
