= Antebellum Puzzle =

The Antebellum Puzzle, first reported in 1979, refers to the finding that the height of the male U.S. population, although the tallest in the world, declined during the decades preceding the Civil War. The finding was corroborated on the basis of the height of West Point cadets in 1987. The reason was that the nutritional intake of the U.S. population declined at the onset of modern economic growth because productivity in agriculture and food lagged far behind the productivity in industry bringing about an absolute and relative increase in the price of food, while at the same time an increase in overall agricultural production took place because of the great increases of non-food production (e.g., cotton and tobacco).

Fogel and co-authors reflect the consensus view by concluding, that “the estimates… indicate a considerable decline in diet after 1840; the 1840 level was not recovered until 1870. A large decline in per capita production of wheat, rye, pork, and beef accounts for this big deficit in American dietary history. The lack of nutrients was demonstrated by the soaring prices of those foodstuffs, another downside indicator of food consumption.” Adding that “…the increase in agricultural productivity did not keep up with the rapid growth of the population and its food demands.” And “…food output did not keep pace with the demands of the urban-industrial sectors whose population increased approximately ten times during the first half of the nineteenth century…. Per capita crop consumption may have declined throughout the antebellum period. Excess demand had increased grain prices by 1860, and the change in food availability contributed to the decline in the population’s nutritional status in the first half of the nineteenth century.”

Historical cotton production
Year	Thousands of bales	% of total export
1800	73	15.7
1810	178	35.7
1850	2,136	53.4
1870	4,025	60.3
1900	10,266	17.6

Cotton production in acres continued to rise 7.7 million acres at the end of the Civil War, before reaching a peak of 46.0 million acres in 1925. Tobacco and cotton have been referred to as "starvation crops" colloquially by some agriculturalists. It is possible this term arose from the nutritional outcomes the Antebellum Puzzle focuses on and the coinciding increases in cotton and tobacco productions as agricultural food stuffs became less in supply.

== Bibliography ==
- Floud, Roderick; Fogel, Robert W.; Harris, Bernard; Hong, Sok Chul (2009). The Changing Body. Cambridge: Cambridge University Press. doi:10.1017/cbo9780511975912. ISBN 978-0-511-97591-2.
