= Economics and Human Biology =

- Discipline: Economics, occupational health, public health
- Language: English
- Edited by: Susan Averett, Joerg Baten, Pinka Chatterji

Publication details
- History: 2003—present
- Publisher: Elsevier
- Frequency: Quarterly
- Open access: Hybrid
- Impact factor: 2.5 (2022)

Standard abbreviations
- ISO 4: Econ. Hum. Biol.

Indexing
- ISSN: 1570-677X (print); 1873-6130 (web)
- LCCN: 2003243295
- OCLC no.: 60624583

Links
- Journal homepage; Online archive

Economics and Human Biology is a quarterly peer-reviewed academic journal published by Elsevier. It was established in 2003 with J. Komlos as founding editor-in-chief. The journal covers research on biological economics — economics in the context of human biology and public or occupational health. The editors-in-chief are Susan Averett (Lafayette College), Joerg Baten (Eberhard Karls University of Tübingen), and Pinka Chatterji (University at Albany).

== Abstracting and indexing ==
The journal is abstracted and indexed in:

- CAB Abstracts
- Current Contents/Social and Behavioral Sciences
- EconLit
- Embase
- Food Science and Technology Abstracts
- Index Medicus/MEDLINE/PubMed
- Science Citation Index Expanded
- Scopus
- Social Sciences Citation Index

According to the Journal Citation Reports, the journal has a 2022 impact factor of 2.5.
