= John Komlos =

American economic historian

- Born: 28 December 1944 (age 81); Budapest, Hungary

Academic background
- Education: University of Chicago
- Influences: Robert Fogel

Academic work
- Discipline: Economic history
- Institutions: LMU Munich; University of North Carolina at Chapel Hill
- Notable ideas: Economics and Human Biology

John Komlos (born 28 December 1944) is an American economic historian of Hungarian descent and former holder of the chair of economic history at LMU Munich.

== Personal life ==
Komlos was born in 1944 in Budapest in Hungary during the Holocaust. After becoming refugees during the 1956 revolution, his family fled to the United States where Komlos finally grew up in Chicago.

== Career ==
Komlos received a PhD in history in 1978 and a second PhD in economics in 1990 from the University of Chicago. After inspired by Robert Fogel to work on the history of human height, Komlos devoted most of his academic career developing and expanding the research agenda that became known as Anthropometric history, the study of the effect of economic development on human biology as indicated by the physical stature or the obesity rate prevalence of a population.

Komlos was a fellow at the Carolina Population Center of the University of North Carolina at Chapel Hill from 1984 to 1986. He worked as a professor of economics and of economic history at LMU Munich for eighteen years before his retirement. He also taught as a visitor at Harvard University, Duke University, the University of North Carolina at Chapel Hill, as well as at the University of Vienna and the University of St. Gallen.

In 2003, Komlos founded Economics and Human Biology, a quarterly peer-reviewed academic journal covering research on biological economics, economics in the context of human biology and health. In 2013, he was elected a Fellow of the Cliometric Society.

== Works ==
- Nutrition and Economic Development in the Eighteenth-Century Habsburg Monarchy: An Anthropometric history. Princeton, New Jersey: Princeton University Press. 1989.
- Komlos, John, ed. (1990). Economic development in the Habsburg Monarchy and in the Successor States: Essays. Boulder, Colorado: East European Monographs; Distributed by Columbia University Press. ISBN 9780880331777.
- Komlos, John, ed. (1995). The Biological Standard of Living on Three Continents: Further Explorations in Anthropometric History. Boulder, San Francisco, Oxford: Westview Press. ISBN 9780813320557.
- Komlos, John (2019). Foundations of real-world economics: What every economics student needs to know. Abington, Oxon & New York, NY: Routledge, Taylor & Francis Group. ISBN 978-1351584715.
