= Plica =

Plica may refer to:

- Plica (lizard), a genus of lizards
- Capillaria plica, a parasitic nematode
- Plica (sigillography) - term from sigillography
- A fold or crease, especially of skin or other tissue, from medieval Latin plicare ("to fold")
  - Plica fimbriata: Fimbriated fold of tongue
  - Plica semilunaris of the conjunctiva
  - Plica semilunaris of the fauces
  - Plica syndrome of the knee
  - Plica circularis, also called circular fold, of the small intestine
- The hair disease Plica polonica: Polish plait
- In early music notation, a note indicated in a ligature
