= Maryanne Kowaleski =

American historian

Maryanne Kowaleski, FRHistS, is a medieval historian, author and scholar, who was Joseph Fitzpatrick S. J. Distinguished Professor of History and Medieval Studies at Fordham University from 2005 until her retirement.

== Education and career ==
Kowaleski completed her undergraduate studies at the University of Michigan, graduating with an AB in 1974 with a double major in French and Medieval/Renaissance studies. She then completed a Master of Arts degree in medieval studies at the University of Toronto in 1976, before completing the Medieval Studies Licentiate in 1978 at the Pontifical Institute of Medieval Studies at Toronto, before spending the 1978–79 academic year as a Fulbright Scholar at the University of Exeter in the United Kingdom where she would conduct lectures and research. She returned to the University of Toronto to carry out her doctoral studies; her PhD was awarded in 1982. Kowaleski's first academic appointment came in 1982, when she joined the History Department at Fordham University as an assistant professor. Six years later she was promoted to associate professor, and then to full professor in 1996 where she remained until retirement in 2005. Over the course of her career, Kowaleski has contributed to and published multiple collections and books, such as Medieval Towns: A Reader, in 2008 and Medieval Domesticity: Home, Housing and Household in Medieval England in 2009.

== Honours ==
Kowaleski was elected a Fellow of the Royal Historical Society in 1994 and a Fellow of the Medieval Academy of America in 2005, of which she would serve as President from 2012-2013.

== Selected works ==
- (Co-edited with John Langdon and Phillipp Schofield) Peasants and Lords in the Medieval English Economy: Essays in Honour of Bruce M. S. Campbell (Brepols, 2015).
- (Co-edited with P. J. P. Goldberg) Medieval Domesticity: Home, Housing and Household in Medieval England (Cambridge University Press, 2009).
- (Edited and translated) Medieval Towns: A Reader (Broadview Press, 2006).
- (Co-edited with Mary Erler) Gendering the Master Narrative: Women and Power in the Middle Ages (Cornell University Press, 2003).
- The Havener's Accounts of the Earldom and Duchy of Cornwall, 1287–1356, Devon and Cornwall Record Society, New Series, no. 44 (2001).
- Local Markets and Regional Trade in Medieval Exeter (Cambridge University Press, 1995).
- The Local Customs Accounts of the Port of Exeter, 1266–1321, Devon and Cornwall Record Society, New Series, no. 36 (1993).
- (Co-edited with Mary Erler) Women and Power in the Middle Ages (University of Georgia Press, 1988).
- (Co-written with Judith M. Bennet) Crafts, Gilds, and Women in the Middle Ages: Fifty Years after Marian K. Dale, Signs Vol. 14, No. 2 (The University of Chicago Press, 1989)
- Medieval People in Town and Country: New Perspectives from Demography and Bioarchaeology, Speculum, Vol. 89, No. 3, (The University of Chicago Press on behalf of the Medieval Academy of America, 2014)
- (Co-written with Sharon N. Dewitte) Black Death Bodies, Fragments, Volume 6, (Michigan Publishing, 2017)
