= William Copland =

English printer

William Copland (died 1569) was an English printer. He printed popular works of the day, such as chivalric romances.

== Life ==
Copland was believed by Thomas Frognall Dibdin to have been the younger brother of Robert Copland. He worked in his office until Robert Copland's death, and continued as printer in the same house until 1558. He was an original member of the Stationers' Company, and was named in the charter of 1556.

He received a licence in 1546 to marry Joanne Tyddeswell of St Bride's. From 1558 he was in Thames Street, "in the Vyntre upon the Three Craned Warfe" until about 1562, after which he had an office in Lothbury, "over against Sainct Margarytes church".

Copland was buried on 30 May 1569 at St Margaret Lothbury. The Stationers' Company "Payd for the buryall of Coplande vjs"; this may not mean they were called upon to bear his funeral expenses, but rather that the company had in some way honoured the last ceremonies of a benefactor and original member.

== Works ==
The earliest dated volume bearing his imprint is The Understandinge of the Lordes Supper. … Jmprinted at London, in Fletestrete, at ye signe of the Rose Garland, in 1548.

Books from his press included The xiii bukes of Eneados (1553), The foure Sonnes of Aimon (1554), Kynge Arthur (1557), and the following without a date: Syr Isenbras, Howleglas (three editions), The Knyght of the Swanne, Jyl of Breyntford's Testament (two editions, Borde's Introduction of Knowledge, Valentyne and Orson, and other popular romances. Dibdin knew of no book printed by Copland after 1561, although A Dyaloge between ij Beggers is registered for him between 1567 and 1568. He compiled and printed A boke of the Properties of Herbes (1552). During his career he produced over 150 books.

== Assessment ==
Henry Richard Tedder wrote (1887): "Both Robert and William Copland used the same kind of worn and inferior types, and their workmanship shows little of the beauty that marks the productions of Wynkyn de Worde, but the memory of William deserves respect as one who printed many interesting specimens of popular English literature, all of which are now extremely rare."

Mary Erler has written (2004): "Because of his connection with Robert Copland, and Robert's with Caxton's heir, Wynkyn de Worde, William Copland represents the fourth in a direct line of succession from England's first printer."
