= The Moral Economy =

The Moral Economy Poverty, Credit, And Trust In Early Modern Europe
- Author: Laurence Fontaine
- Subject: Economic history
- Publisher: Cambridge University Press
- Publication date: 7 April 2014
- Media type: Print
- Pages: 328 pp (paperback)
- ISBN: 978-1107603707

The Moral Economy: Poverty, Credit, And Trust In Early Modern Europe is a 2014 economic history book by Laurence Fontaine.

== Summary ==
There were according to Fontaine two conflicting economic cultures in the period: the gift-based "aristocratic culture" in rural areas and the contract-based bourgeois economy (or "merchant culture") in urban areas. According to reviewer Steven M. Beaudoin, the first six chapters address the range of practices and experiences associated with debt and credit. Fontaine in the first chapter explains "the mechanisms that made debt, and thus credit, a ubiquitous experience, common to aristocrats, merchants, and peasants". Chapters two and three center on rural debt, and chapters four through six center on urban economies.

The remaining chapters feature greater focus on the values associated with each economic culture. Chapter nine, according to Philipp Robinson Rössner, "closely studies bargaining in markets as a form resembling the modern bazaar, a somewhat logical behaviour in markets whose products were marked by a lack of standardisation, uncertainty about quality and the value of currencies."

According to Jon Stobart, the secondary material largely discusses the situation in France, but " there is also an impressive array of reading on Italy, Spain, Portugal, England, and, to a lesser extent, Germany."

== Reception ==
Anne E. C. McCants lauded The Moral Economy as a "magisterial overview of the social context of money-lending and poverty before the industrial age". Jon Stobart called it "a book of considerable scope and ambition". He claimed that Fontaine's analysis is "rich with the granular detail of individual stories". Stobart also praised Fontaine for "drawing on a wide range of secondary material. [...] This allows the argument to be nuanced with local and national variations". He criticized the lack of a bibliography and index, but still concluded, "In exploring both the archetypes and the liminal world between them, Fontaine demonstrates the complexity and contingency of both moral and market economies."

Steven M. Beaudoin described the work as "a thorough and nuanced representation of the early modern European economy." He praised chapters four through six as "deftly constructing the foundations and habits associated with each economic culture." Carl Wennerlind said the ninth chapter is "an excellent chapter and deserves to be read widely by students interested in early modern economic life." He criticized Fontaine's implication that a key focus of the book is the "extent to which the moral economy is a useful device for thinking about the future" of economics, noting that the book is mostly just a history of the economics of the time period. However, Wennerlind wrote that "providing a high-resolution image of the early modern European moral economy [is] a task the book performs remarkably well."

Jane Whittle argued, "This substantial and important book is full of insights into the nature of early modern markets and credit relationships." She praised the "detailed case studies" in the second half of the book. Whittle criticized the book's subtitle, saying that the book is mainly about France and England, and doesn't cover Scandinavia or eastern Europe. She also criticized the lack of an index or bibliography, and argued that "rather than drawing out contrasts between regions, the underlying assumption often appears to be that patterns were the same everywhere." However, Whittle still praised The Moral Economy as "an important step forward in the ways we think about the pre-modern economy."

Brodie Waddell commended Fontaine's erudition but said the broad perspective is both a strength and a weakness: "On one hand, her voluminous reading of the secondary literature allows her to draw on evidence from a range of countries, [...] She makes astute comparisons between these different contexts, noting commonalities but also contrasts. On the other hand, it is obviously impossible to produce a study that deals thoroughly with the whole of early modern Europe", as most of the primary research is on 18th-century Paris. Still, Waddell wrote that "her central conclusions about the pervasiveness of debt, the importance of non-economic ties and the contested nature of credit are persuasive."

Philipp Robinson Rössner said that Fontaine "drives home[...] the point that all economic transactions are somewhat framed and embedded within[...] ethical norms", but said, "Fontaine turns Polanyi on its head, so to speak: the economy never really became disembedded [...] It is just the definition and extent of this 'moral' that changed over time". He also said the book shows the gift economy always coexisted with the capitalist economy. But Rössner also wrote, "As brilliant as the book’s narrative and content are, a lot seems to have gotten lost in translation and copyediting".
