= John Langdon (historian) =

John L. Langdon (24 December 1944 – 31 December 2016) was a British-born Canadian economic and social historian of medieval England.

== Career ==
Langdon undertook his doctoral work at the University of Birmingham, UK under the supervision of Christopher Dyer. He worked at the University of Alberta, Canada (1984–2010), being appointed assistant professor of British medieval history in 1984. Beloved by his students, he ranked 4.6 out of 5 on RateMyProfessors.com.

He is best known for his contributions on medieval English technology, chiefly two monographs: Horses, Oxen and Technological Innovation: The Use of Draught Animals in English Farming from 1066–1500 (Cambridge University Press, 1986) and Mills in the Medieval Economy: England 1300–1540 (Oxford University Press, 2004).

He also co-edited a number of essay collections. With Grenville G. Astill, he edited Medieval Farming and Technology: The Impact of Agricultural Change in Northwest Europe (Brill, 1997). With Richard Goddard and Miriam Müller he edited a festschrift for Professor Christopher Dyer: Survival and Discord in Medieval Society, Essays in Honour of Christopher Dyer. Together with Maryanne Kowaleski and Phillipp R. Schofield he edited a festschrift for Professor Bruce Campbell: Peasants and Lords in the Medieval English Economy: Essays in Honour of Bruce M.S. Campbell.

His research continued into his retirement, his last research project, "A war over water: The 1531 English Statue of Sewers and its impact upon local politics, economies and environments" commencing in 2013.

== Selected works ==
=== Author ===
==== Books ====
- Horses, Oxen and Technological Innovation: The Use of Draught Animals in English Farming from 1066–1500
- Mills in the Medieval Economy: England 1300–1540

==== Articles ====
- Langdon, John. "The Economics of Horses and Oxen in Medieval England." The Agricultural History Review 30, no. 1 (1982): 31-40
- Langdon, John. "Horse Hauling: A Revolution in Vehicle Transport in Twelfth and Thirteenth-century England?" Past and Present 103, no. 1 (1984): 37–66.
- Langdon, John. "A Quiet Revolution - The Horse in Agriculture, 1100-1500." History Today 39, no. 7 (1989): 32.
- Langdon, John. "Water-mills and Windmills in the West Midlands, 1086-1500." Economic History Review 44, no. 3 (1991): 424–45.
- Langdon, John. "The Birth and Demise of a Medieval Windmill." History of Technology 14 (1992): 54–77.
- Langdon, John. "Inland Water Transport in Medieval England." Journal of Historical Geography 19, no. 1 (1993): 1-11.
- Langdon, John. "The Mobilization of Labour in the Milling Industry of Thirteenth- and Early Fourteenth-century England." Canadian Journal of History/Annales Canadiennes D'Histoire 31, no. 1 (1996): 37–58.
- Langdon, John. "Inland Water Transport in Medieval England — the View from the Mills: A Response to Jones." Journal of Historical Geography 26, no. 1 (2000): 75–82.
- Langdon, John., and Martin. Watts. "Tower Windmills in Medieval England: A Case of Arrested Development?" Technology and Culture 46, no. 4 (2005): 697–718.
- Langdon, John, and James Masschaele. "Commercial Activity and Population Growth in Medieval England" Past & Present 190, no. 1 (2006): 35–81.
- Tara Gale, John Langdon and Natalie Leishman "Piety and Political Accommodation in Norman England", Haskins Society Journal, vol. 18 (2007), pp. 110–31.
- Bailey, B. Gregory, Meaghan E Bernard, Gregory Carrier, Cherise L Elliott, John Langdon, Natalie Leishman, Michal Mlynarz, Oksana Mykhed, and Lindsay C Sidders. "Coming of Age and the Family in Medieval England." Journal of Family History 33, no. 1 (2008): 41–60.
- Claridge, Jordan, and John Langdon. "Storage in Medieval England: The Evidence from Purveyance Accounts, 1295–13491." Economic History Review 64, no. 4 (2011): 1242–265.
- Langdon, John, and Jordan Claridge. "Transport in Medieval England." History Compass 9, no. 11 (2011): 864–75.
- Claridge, Jordan, and John Langdon. "The composition of famuli labour on English demesnes, c. 1300." Agricultural History Review 63, no. 2 (2015): 187–220.
- Langdon, John and James White. "An Early Seventeenth-century River Environment: the 1618 Survey of the Itchen" Hampshire Studies Volume 72, Number 1, December 2017, pp. 142–165.

=== Editor ===
- Medieval Farming and Technology: The Impact of Agricultural Change in Northwest Europe (With Grenville Astill)
- Survival and Discord in Medieval Society, Essays in Honour of Christopher Dyer
- Peasants and Lords in the Medieval English Economy: Essays in Honour of Bruce M.S. Campbell
