= Bruce Campbell (historian) =

British economic historian

Bruce Mortimer Stanley Campbell, FBA, MRIA, MAE, FRHistS, FAcSS (born 11 June 1949) is a British and Irish economic historian. From 1995 to 2014, he was Professor of Medieval Economic History at Queen's University Belfast, where he remains an emeritus professor and honorary professor.

== Career ==
Bruce Mortimer Stanley Campbell was born in Hertfordshire on 11 June 1949 to Reginald Arthur Mortimer and Mary Campbell. He studied geography at the University of Liverpool, graduating with a first-class Bachelor of Arts honours degree in 1970; he then completed his doctorate under the supervision of Dr Alan Baker at Darwin College, Cambridge, in 1975. His thesis was on "Field systems in eastern Norfolk during the Middle Ages: a study with particular reference to the demographic and agrarian changes of the fourteenth century". He lectured in geography at Queen's University Belfast from 1973 and was seconded to the Department of Economic History in 1989. A committed teacher, he was promoted to a readership in 1992 and appointed Professor of Medieval Economic History in 1995. His research has spanned the eleventh to the nineteenth centuries with a primary focus on the economic and environmental history of late medieval Britain and Ireland.

== Honours ==
Campbell was elected a Fellow of the Royal Historical Society in 2001, an Academician of Social Sciences (later renamed Fellow of the Academy of Social Sciences) two years later, and a Fellow of the British Academy (FBA), the United Kingdom's national academy for the humanities and social sciences, in 2009. He has also been a Member of the Royal Irish Academy since 1997 and a Member of the Academia Europaea since 2013. He won the Economic History Association's Arthur H. Cole Prize in 1984, and his book English Seigniorial Agriculture 1250–1450 (2000) was named proxime accesit for the Royal Historical Society's Whitfield Prize in 2000. Campbell’s Book, The Great Transition: Climate, Disease, and Society in the Late Medieval World, published by Cambridge University Press in 2016, was shortlisted for the Turku Book Prize of the European Society for Environmental History and received the Economic History Association’s biennial György Ránki Prize in 2017. He has delivered keynote lectures at international conferences, gave the Tawney Memorial Lecture to the Economic History Society in 2008, and served as the Ellen McArthur Lecturer at the University of Cambridge in 2012-13. He was the dedicatee of a festschrift edited by Maryanne Kowaleski, John Langdon and Phillipp Schofield: Peasants and Lords in the Medieval English Economy: Essays in Honour of Bruce M. S. Campbell (Brepols, 2015, which contains a bibliography of his published works to that date.

== Selected works ==
- Co-authored with Francis Ludlow, Climate, disease, and society in late medieval Ireland, 159-252, in James Kelly and Tomás Ó Carragáin, eds., Climate and society in Ireland, Proceedings of the Royal Irish Academy: Archaeology, Culture, History, Literature, 120C. Dublin, 2021.
- Global Climates, the 1257 mega eruption of Samalas Volcano, Indonesia, and the English food crisis of 1258, Transactions of the Royal History Society, 27, 2017, 87-121.
- The Great Transition: Climate, Disease and Society in the Late-Medieval World (Cambridge University Press, 2016).
- (Co-authored with Stephen N. Broadberry, Alexander Klein, Bas van Leeuwen and Mark Overton) British Economic Growth, 1270–1870 (Cambridge University Press, 2015).
- "Nature as historical protagonist: environment and society in pre-industrial England" (the 2008 Tawney Memorial Lecture), Economic History Review, vol. 63, no. 2 (2010), pp. 281–314.
- Field Systems and Farming Systems in Late Medieval England (Ashgate, 2008).
- Land and People in Late Medieval England (Ashgate, 2007).
- The Medieval Antecedents of English Agricultural Progress (Ashgate, 2007).
- (Co-authored with Ken Bartley) England on the Eve of the Black Death: An Atlas of Lay Lordship, Land, and Wealth, 1300–49 (Manchester University Press, 2006).
- English Seigniorial Agriculture 1250–1450 (Cambridge University Press, 2000).
- (Edited with R. H. Britnell) A Commercialising Economy: England 1086–c. 1300 (Manchester University Press, 1995).
- (Co-authored with James A. Galloway, Derek Keene and Margaret Murphy) A Medieval Capital and its Grain Supply: Agrarian Production and its Distribution in the London Region c. 1300, Historical Geography Research series, no. 30 (Institute of British Geographers, 1993).
- (Edited) Before the Black Death: Studies in the "Crisis" of the Early Fourteenth Century (Manchester University Press, 1991).
- (Co-edited with Mark Overton) Land, Labour and Livestock: Historical Studies in European Agricultural Productivity (Manchester University Press, 1991).

Campbell has also produced a database, Three Centuries of English Crop Yields, 1211–1491, bringing together data on pre-modern harvests.
