= Christopher Dyer =

English professor of history

- Born: 1944 (age 81–82); England
- Education: University of Birmingham
- Known for: English history

Christopher Charles Dyer CBE FBA (born 1944) is an English Leverhulme emeritus professor of local history and a former director of the Centre for English Local History at the University of Leicester, England.

He was appointed Commander of the Order of the British Empire (CBE) in the 2008 Birthday Honours.

== Background ==
Educated at the University of Birmingham where he studied under Rodney Hilton, Dyer has taught at the Universities of Birmingham and Edinburgh, where he counted amongst his students the former Prime Minister Gordon Brown. He came to the University of Leicester in 2001.

== Work ==
Dyer is known as an historian of everyday life. His work examines the economic and social history of medieval life, with an emphasis on the English Midlands from the Saxon period through to the 16th century. He delivered the Ford Lectures at the University of Oxford for 2000–01, titled "An Age of Transition? Economy and Society in England in the Later Middle Ages".

On 25 October 2013, Dyer presented his lecture "Corby, Northamptonshire and Beyond: The History of Industry in the Countryside" at The Marc Fitch Lectures.

== Selected publications ==
- Dyer, Christopher (2007). "A Suffolk farmer in the fifteenth century". Agricultural History Review. 55 (1): 1–22. JSTOR 40276126.
- Making a Living in the Middle Ages: the People of Britain, 850–1520 (London and New Haven, 2002 (Yale UP); London, 2003 (Penguin); New Haven, 2003 (American paperback, Yale UP), 403 pp.ISBN 0-300-09060-9
- Standards of Living in the Later Middle Ages: Social Change in England c. 1200–1520 (Cambridge 1989) 297 pp.ISBN 0 521 25127 3 hardback, ISBN 0 521 27215 7 paperback.
- Lords and Peasants in a Changing Society: the Estates of the Bishopric of Worcester, 680–1540 (Cambridge 1980) 427 pp.
- "The urbanizing of Staffordshire: the first phases", Staffordshire Studies, 14 (2002), pp. 1–31
- (with Jane Laughton), "Seasonal patterns of trade in the later Middle Ages: buying and selling at Melton Mowbray, Leicestershire, 1400–1520", Nottingham Medieval Studies, 46 (2002), pp. 162–84.
- "Villages and non-villages in the medieval Cotswolds", Transactions of the Bristol and Gloucestershire Archaeological Society, 120 (2002), pp. 11–35.
- Dyer, Christopher (2003). "The archaeology of medieval small towns". Medieval Archaeology. 47: 85–114. doi:10.1179/med.2003.47.1.85. S2CID 162069282.
- (with Phillipp R. Schofield), "Estudios recientes sobre la historia agraria y rural medieval britanica", Historia Agraria, 31 (2003), pp. 13–33.
- "Birmingham in the Middle Ages", in Birmingham: Bibliography of a City, ed. Carl Chinn (Birmingham, 2003), pp. 1–14.
- "Alternative agriculture: goats in medieval England", in People, Landscape and Alternative Agriculture: Essays for Joan Thirsk, ed. R. W. Hoyle (Agricultural History Review Supplement Series, 3, 2004), pp. 20–38.
- (with M. Ciaraldi, R. Cuttler and L. Dingwall), "Medieval tanning and retting at Brewood, Staffordshire: archaeological excavations 1999–2000", Staffordshire Archaeological and Historical Society Transactions, 40 (2004), pp. 1–57.
- "The political life of the fifteenth-century English village", The Fifteenth Century, 4 (2004), pp. 135–57.
- An Age of Transition? Economy and Society in England in the Later Middle Ages (Oxford, 2005) [the Ford Lectures for 2001].
- "Bishop Wulfstan and his estates", in St Wulfstan and his World, ed. Julia Barrow and Nicholas Brooks (Aldershot 2005), pp. 137–45.
- Bromsgrove: a small town in Worcestershire in the Middle Ages. Occasional Publications. Vol. 9. Worcestershire Historical Society. 2000. ISSN 0140-9913.
