= Mark Overton =

British agricultural historian

Mark Overton, FAcSS, is a British agricultural historian and formerly Professor of Economic and Social History at the University of Exeter, where he was Deputy Vice-Chancellor from 2006 to 2013.

== Career ==
Overton completed his undergraduate studies at the University of Exeter, graduating with a degree in economic history and geography. In 1972, he began his doctoral studies in historical geography at the University of Cambridge; the PhD was awarded in 1981 for his thesis "Agricultural change in Norfolk and Suffolk, 1580–1740." He was appointed an assistant lecturer at Cambridge in 1974 and then a Fellow at Emmanuel College. In 1979, he was appointed to a lectureship in the Department of Geography at Newcastle University, where he was subsequently promoted to Senior Lecturer and Reader. In 1995, he was appointed Professor of Economic and Social History at the University of Exeter. He also served as Dean of Postgraduate Studies at Exeter from 1998 to 2001, and was Deputy Vice-Chancellor from 2006 to 2013, when he became Dean of Taught Programmes. He had retired from Exeter by 2016. Overton was a long-serving Treasurer of the Agricultural History Society, of which he was also President from 2013 to 2016.

== Honours ==
Overton has been a Fellow of the Royal Historical Society and a Fellow of the Academy of Social Sciences.

== Selected works ==
- (Co-authored with Stephen Broadberry, Alexander Klein, Bas van Leeuwen and Bruce Campbell) British Economic Growth, 1270–1870 (Cambridge University Press, 2015).
- (Co-authored with Elizabeth Griffiths) Farming to Halves: The Hidden History of Sharefarming in England from Medieval to Modern Times (Palgrave Macmillan, 2009).
- (Co-authored with Darron Dean, Andrew Hann and Jane Whittle) Production and Consumption in English Households, 1600-1750 (Routledge, 2004).
- Agricultural Revolution in England: The Transformation of the Agrarian Economy, 1500-1850, Cambridge Studies in Historical Geography (Cambridge University Press, 1996).
- (Co-edited with Bruce Campbell) Land, Labour and Livestock: Historical Studies in European Agricultural Productivity (Manchester University Press, 1991).
