= Plica (sigillography) =

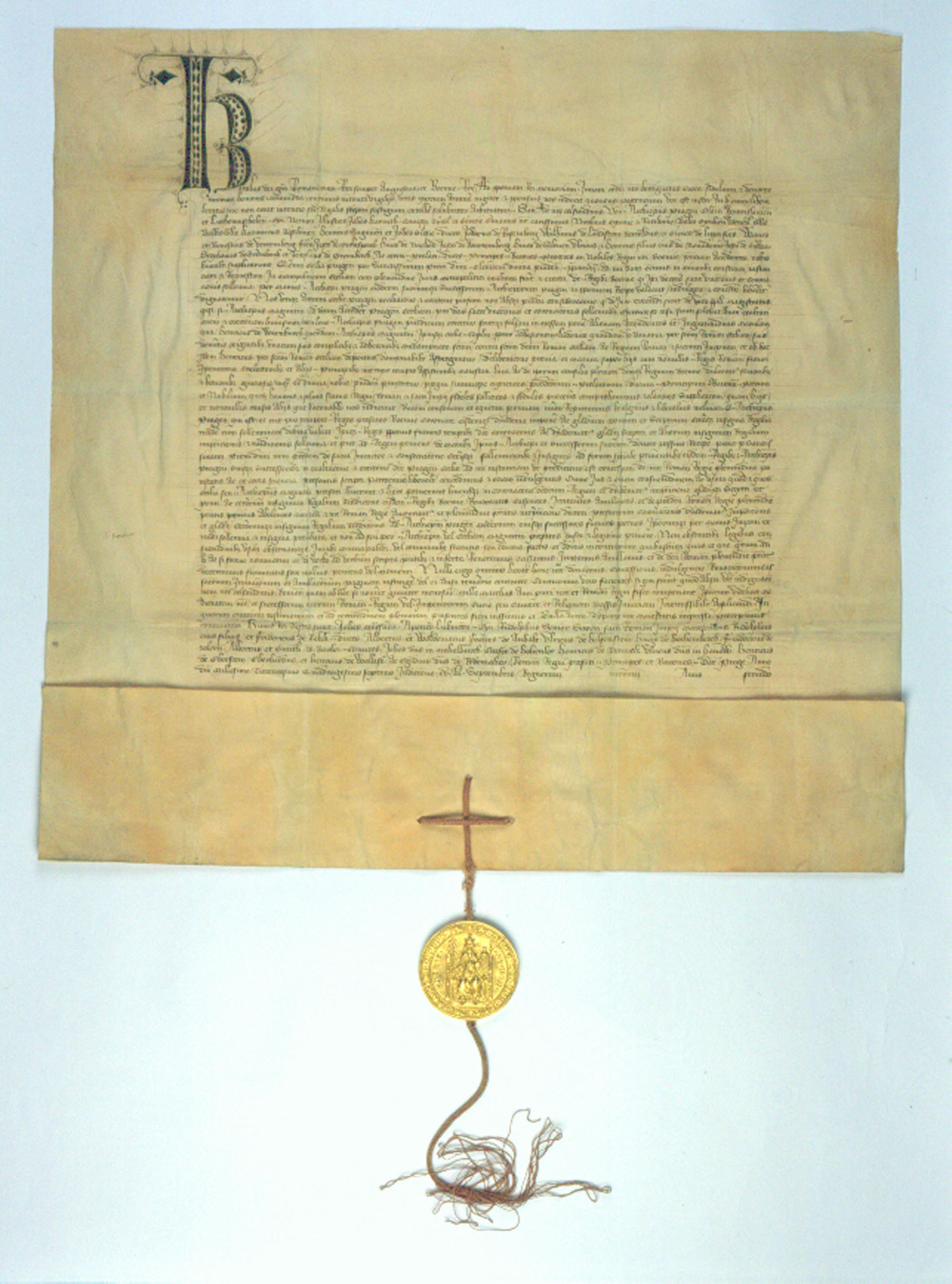
Plica on a deed of Charles IV.

Plica (from Latin plica, meaning fold) is a term used in sigillography and related archival contexts for a reinforcement of the lower edge of a charter or deed, produced by folding up the bottom of the sheet of parchment to achieve a double thickness.

The purpose of the fold is to provide a more secure anchorage for the seal, and to guard against the parchment being torn. Slots were normally cut in the double thickness of parchment, a cord or tag of parchment threaded through them, and the seal attached to that.
