= Mary Erler =

American literary scholar

Mary Carpenter Erler is an American literary scholar specialising in medieval and early modern English literature and printing, and on women's reading and book-ownership in the same periods. Since 2015, she has been a distinguished professor in Fordham University's English Faculty.

== Career ==
Erler completed her undergraduate degree in English at Saint Mary's College, Indiana, before gaining her Master of Arts degree and doctorate in English from the University of Chicago; her PhD was awarded in 1981 for her thesis "The poems and prefaces of Robert Copland (fl. 1505–47)". Erler took up a post at Fordham University and has remained a part of its English Faculty since. In the 1990s, she chaired the Faculty during a period when the Rose Hill and Lincoln Center campus were merged, and was appointed to a distinguished professorship in 2015.

Erler's research has focused on medieval and early modern English literature and printing. Her early research looked at the life and work of the sixteenth-century poet and printer Robert Copland, and she has since studied Syon Abbey, a nunnery which housed a substantial library and one of England's earliest printing presses. Her work has extended to studying women's reading and book-ownership in late medieval and early modern England, topics on which she has authored two monographs. Her research, which has also intersected with history and art history, has additionally focused on woodcuts, monastic libraries, widows, medieval London, books of hours, the Dissolution of the Monasteries and medieval theater.

The Center for Medieval Studies at Fordham University held its 35th annual conference in 2015 in Erler's honour, entitled "Reading and Writing in City, Court, and Cloister: Conference in Honor of Mary C. Erler"; speakers included Maryanne Kowaleski, Michael Sargent, Joyce Coleman, Kathryn Smith, Caroline Barron, Sheila Lindenbaum and Thelma Fenster.

== Selected publications ==
- (Co-authored with Maryanne Kowaleski) Women and Power in the Middle Ages (University of Georgia Press, 1988).
- (Co-edited with Thelma S. Fenster) Poems of Cupid, God of Love (E. J. Brill, 1991).
- (Editor) Robert Copland: Complete Poems (University of Toronto Press, 1993).
- Women, Reading, and Piety in Late Medieval England (Cambridge University Press, 2002).
- (Co-authored with Maryanne Kowaleski) Gendering the Master Narrative: Women and Power in the Middle Ages (Cornell University Press, 2003).
- (Editor) Ecclesiastical London, Records of Early English Drama (University of Toronto Press and The British Library, 2008).
- Reading and Writing during the Dissolution: Monks, Nuns and Friars 1530–1558 (Cambridge University Press, 2013).
