= Plica semilunaris of the fauces =

Fold of mucous membrane in the mouth

Details

Identifiers
- Latin: plica semilunaris faucium
- TA98: A05.2.01.008
- TA2: 2850
- FMA: 55049

The plica semilunaris is the thin upper part of the fold of mucous membrane in the supratonsillar fossa that reaches across between the two arches. A separate fold is called the plica triangularis which runs inferoposteriorly from the posterior surface of the palatoglossal arch to cover the inferior portion of the tonsil.
