= Jane Whittle =

British agricultural historian

Jane C. Whittle FBA, FRHistS, is a British agricultural historian, who has been Professor of Economic and Social History at the University of Exeter since 2012.

== Career ==
Whittle completed her undergraduate studies at the University of Manchester, graduating with a first-class degree in history in 1991. She then carried out her doctoral studies at the University of Oxford; her DPhil was awarded in 1995 for her thesis "The development of agrarian capitalism in England from c. 1450–c. 1580." She was then appointed to a lectureship in economic and social history at the University of Exeter in 1995, and was promoted to senior lecturer in 2002, associate professor six years later, and then full professor in 2012. She was also chair of the Agricultural History Society from 2012 to 2015.

== Honours ==
Whittle is a Fellow of the Royal Historical Society as of 2018. She was elected a Fellow of the British Academy in 2026.

== Selected works ==
- (Editor) Servants in Rural Europe 1400–1900 (Boydell and Brewer, 2017).
- Landlords and Tenants in Britain, 1440–1660 (Boydell Press, 2013).
- (Co-authored with Elizabeth Griffiths) Consumption and Gender in the Early Seventeenth Century Household: the World of Alice Le Strange (Oxford University Press, 2012).
- (Co-authored with Darron Dean, Andrew Hann and Mark Overton) Production and Consumption in English Households, 1600–1750 (Routledge, 2004).
- The Development of Agrarian Capitalism: Land and Labour in Norfolk, 1440–1580 (Clarendon Press, 2000).
