= Sharon N. DeWitte =

American bioarchaeologist

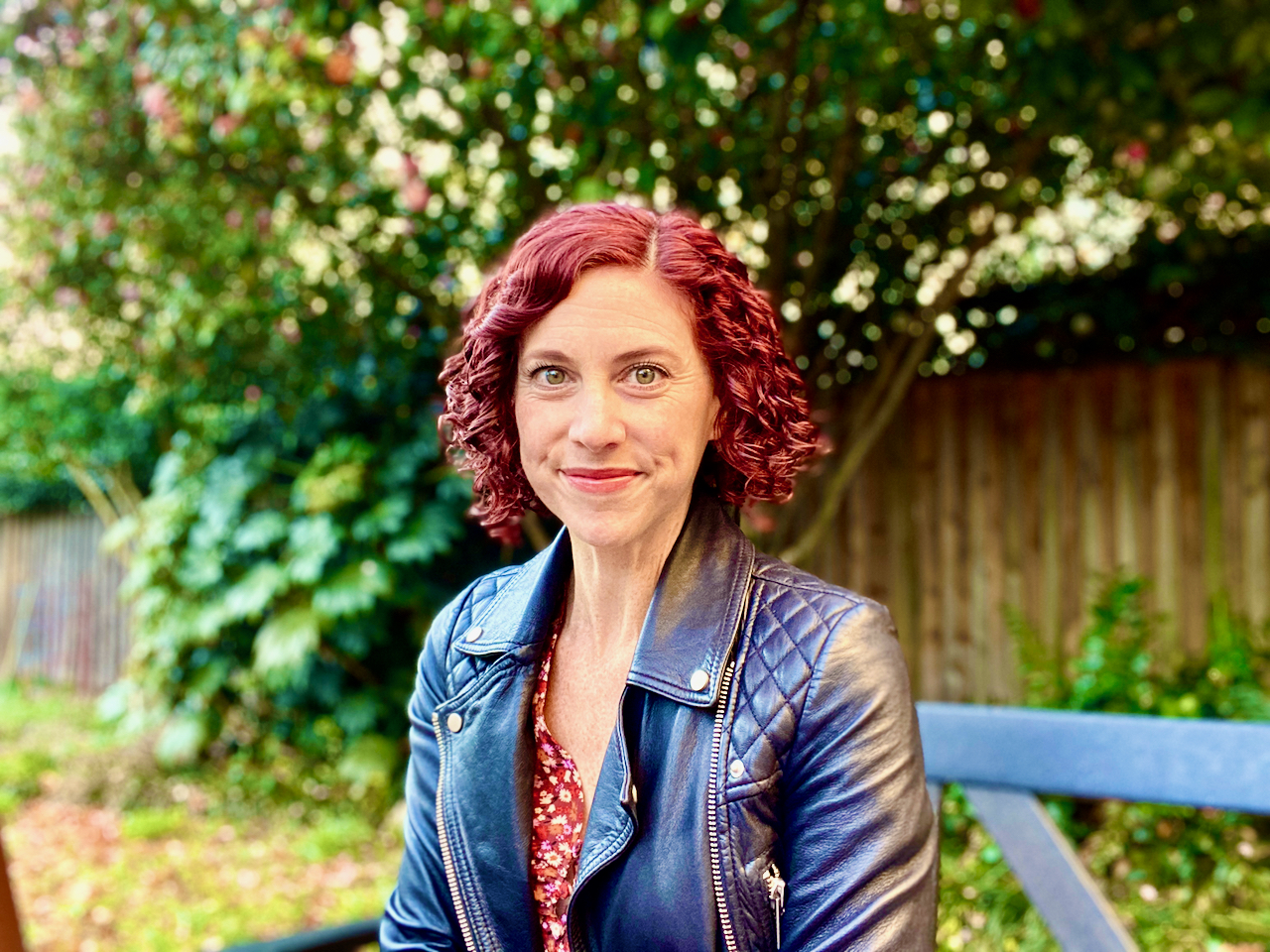
- Born: New Hampshire, USA

Academic background
- Education: AA, Anthropology, 1996, Santa Rosa Junior College; BA, Anthropology, 1999, Sonoma State University; MA, 2001, PhD, Anthropology, 2006, Pennsylvania State University
- Thesis: The Paleodemography of the Black Death 1347-1351 (2006)

Academic work
- Institutions: University of South Carolina; University at Albany, SUNY; University of Colorado Boulder
- Main interests: Black Death

Sharon Nell DeWitte is an American bioarchaeologist. She is a professor in the Department of Anthropology at the University of Colorado Boulder and a Fellow of the American Association for the Advancement of Science. Her research interests include the Black Death.

== Early life and education ==
DeWitte was born in New Hampshire and raised in New Mexico and California. As a youth, she had surgery to insert a metal rod to correct scoliosis of the spine. She graduated from Santa Rosa Junior College with her Associates Degree in 1996 and from Sonoma State University with her Bachelor of Arts degree in 1999 before enrolling at Pennsylvania State University for her graduate degrees. During her doctorate degree, DeWitte received a Dissertation Research Grant from the Wenner-Gren Foundation and the National Science Foundation to investigate the mortality patterns of the Black Death. In order to conduct this research, she drew from a sample of Black Death skeletons from the East Smithfield cemetery in London. DeWitte finished her dissertation, The Paleodemography of the Black Death 1347-1351, in 2006.

== Career ==
Following her PhD, DeWitte became an assistant professor at the University at Albany, SUNY. She eventually left the institution in 2011 to join the University of South Carolina (U of SC). Upon joining the faculty, DeWitte, Kirsten Bos, and Verena Schuenemann analyzed skeletal remains from Black Death victims to draft a reconstructed genome in order to track long periods of the pathogen's evolution and virulence. In 2012, DeWitte received two grants to fund her scholarship on the Black Plague. She first received the Ethel-Jane Westfeldt Bunting Summer Scholarship to fund her research project "The Dynamics of an Ancient Emerging Disease: Demographic and Health Consequences of Medieval Plague." DeWitte then accepted a Cobb Professional Development Grant for her project "Paleoepidemiology of historic plague epidemics: the dynamics of an ancient emerging disease." The results of these projects revealed that there were higher survival rates following the plague and that mortality risks were lower in the post-Black Death population than before the epidemic. As a result of her academic accomplishments and mentorship, DeWitte was named a 2014 McCausland Fellow at U of SC.

In 2016, DeWitte received a grant from the Wenner-Gren Foundation to assist in her analysis of comparing dietary isotope data to mortality risk. She used the grant to combined paleodemographic, paleopathological, and isotopic data from human skeletal remains to examine the intersectionality of diet, sex, socioeconomic status, health, and mortality in the context of the medieval crises of famine and plague. Based on this research, DeWitte concluded that linear enamel hypoplasia, a result of stress during an individual's life, could be an indicator of good health rather than poor. She then utilized her newly created data analysis methods to compare dietary isotope data to mortality risk. In 2021, DeWitte co-authored an article published in the Annals of Human Biology which showed the results of skeletons of people who lived in the 1st - 5th century AD and were buried in Roman cemeteries in Britain.

As a result of her research endeavors, DeWitte was elected a Fellow of the American Association for the Advancement of Science in 2022.

== Selected publications ==
- The Bioarchaeology of Urbanization (2020)
