= Phillipp Schofield =

British medieval historian

Phillipp Schofield FRHistS FAcSS FLSW
- Occupation: Historian

Academic background
- Education: Wadham College, Oxford
- Thesis: Land, family and inheritance in a later medieval community: Birdbrook, 1292–1412 (1992)

Academic work
- Era: Medieval
- Discipline: Historian
- Sub-discipline: Medievallist
- Institutions: Aberystwyth University

Phillipp Richard Schofield is a medieval historian and a professor in Aberystwyth University's Department of History and Welsh History.

== Career ==
Schofield graduated from University College London in 1986, with a BA in ancient and medieval history. He then undertook a doctorate at Wadham College, Oxford, under the supervision of Barbara Harvey: his DPhil was awarded in 1992 for his thesis "Land, family and inheritance in a later medieval community: Birdbrook, 1292–1412". After spending a year working for a commercial law firm, Schofield returned to the University of Oxford to take up a research position at the Wellcome Unit for the History of Medicine in 1993. Three years later, he took up a post in the Cambridge Group for the History of Population and Social Structure at the University of Cambridge, before joining Aberystwyth University in 1998. As of 2018, he is a Professor in the Department of History and Welsh History; he is currently head of that department. He understands and speaks Welsh. Since 2011, he has been co-editor of the Economic History Review, a scholarly journal. Schofield's research focuses on the English medieval rural economy and society.

== Honours ==
In 2016, Schofield was elected a Fellow of the Academy of Social Sciences. He is also a Fellow of the Royal Historical Society as of 2018. In 2019, Schofield was elected a Fellow of the Learned Society of Wales.

== Selected works ==
- Peasants and Historians: Debating the Medieval English Peasantry, Manchester Medieval Studies series (Manchester University Press, 2016).
- (Co-edited with Elizabeth New, Susan Johns and John McEwan) Seals and Society: Medieval Wales, the Welsh Marches and Their English Border Counties (University of Wales Press, 2016).
- (Co-edited with Maryanne Kowaleski and John Langdon) Peasants and Lords in the Medieval English Economy: Essays in Honour of Bruce M. S. Campbell (Brepols, 2015).
- (Edited) Seals and their Context in the Middle Ages (Oxbow Books, 2014).
- (Co-edited with Gérard Béaur, Jean-Michel Chevet and María Teresa Piréz Picazo) Property Rights, Land Markets and Economic Growth in the European Countryside (Brepols, 2013).
- (Co-edited with R. A. Griffiths) Wales and the Welsh in the Middle Ages: Essays Presented to J. Beverley Smith (University of Wales Press, 2011)
- (Co-edited with Thijs Lambrecht) Credit and the Rural Economy in North-Western Europe, c. 1200–c. 1850 (Brepols, 2009).
- (Co-edited with Bas J. P. van Bavel) The Development of Leasehold in Northwestern Europe, c. 1200–1600 (Brepols, 2009).
- (Co-edited with Peter Lambert) Making History: An Introduction to the History and Practices of a Discipline (Taylor & Francis, 2004).
- Peasant and Community in Medieval England, 1200–1500 (Palgrave Macmillan, 2003).
- (Co-authored with Nicholas Mayhew) Credit and Debt in Medieval England, c. 1180–c. 1350 (Oxbow Books, 2002).
