= Richard Sylla =

American economic historian

- Born: Richard Eugene Sylla; January 16, 1940 (age 86); Harvey, Illinois, U.S.
- Education: Harvard University (AB); Harvard University (PhD)
- Known for: Research on American economic history, financial systems, banking history, and capital markets
- Scientific career
- Fields: Economic history, financial history, monetary economics
- Workplaces: New York University; North Carolina State University

Richard Eugene Sylla (born 1940) is an American economic historian and professor emeritus of economics at the NYU Stern School of Business. He is known for his research on the history of financial institutions, banking, and capital markets, particularly in the United States.

He is a research associate of the National Bureau of Economic Research (NBER), and a fellow of the Cliometric Society, the Economic History Association, and the American Academy of Arts and Sciences.

== Early life and education ==
Sylla grew up in Chicago Heights, Illinois, graduating from Bloom High School as co-valedictorian of the class of 1958.

He received his Bachelor of Arts (B.A. summa cum laude), Master of Arts (M.A.), and Ph.D. in economics from Harvard University. He also undertook study at the Indian Statistical Institute in Calcutta.

== Academic career ==
Prior to joining NYU, Sylla taught at North Carolina State University.

Sylla joined New York University’s Stern School of Business in 1990, where he served as the Henry Kaufman Professor of the History of Financial Institutions and Markets until his retirement in 2015. He remains professor emeritus at NYU Stern.

He participated in the TRIUM Global Executive MBA Program, a partnership between NYU Stern, the London School of Economics, and HEC Paris.

He served as chair of the board of trustees of the Museum of American Finance from 2010 to 2020 and has served as a board member since 2020.

== Research and scholarly work ==
Sylla’s research focuses on the historical development of money, banking, financial systems, and capital markets. His work adopts a comparative historical approach, examining the evolution of financial institutions across different national contexts and periods.

A central theme in his scholarship is the relationship between financial system development and economic growth, including comparative studies of economies such as medieval and Renaissance Italy, the Dutch Republic, Great Britain, the United States, and Japan. Sylla’s work contends that these are historical cases of finance-led economic growth. In general, his research has been associated with interpretations that emphasize the importance of financial institutions and markets in enabling sustained economic expansion and shifts in global economic leadership.

Sylla has served as editor of the Journal of Economic History and has been a member of the editorial boards of several academic journals, including Financial History Review, Enterprise and Society, and Economic and Financial History Abstracts.

== Awards and honors ==
Sylla has received grants and awards from organizations including the National Science Foundation and the Alfred P. Sloan Foundation. He also received the Arthur H. Cole Prize of the Economic History Association, the Citibank Award for Excellence in Teaching at NYU Stern, and the Alexander Hamilton Legacy Award of the New York Society of the Cincinnati.

In 2011, he received the Lifetime Achievement Award from the Business History Conference.

== Publications ==
=== Books ===
- Richard Sylla. & David J. Cowen (2018). Alexander Hamilton on Finance, Credit, and Debt. Columbia University Press.
- Sylla, R. (2016). Alexander Hamilton: The Illustrated Biography. Sterling.
- Robert E. Wright. & R. Sylla (2015). Genealogy of American Finance. Columbia University Press.
- Homer, S. & R. Sylla (2005). A History of Interest Rates, Fourth Edition. Wiley Finance.
- Ratner, S., J. Soltow, and R. Sylla (1993). The Evolution of the American Economy: Growth, Welfare, and Decision Making. MacMillan Publishing Company.
- Sylla, R. The American Capital Market, Eighteen Forty-Six to Nineteen Fourteen: A Study of the Effects of Public Policy on Economic Development (1975,Dissertations in American Economic History Ser.). Arno Press.

=== Articles, chapters, and other publications ===
Sylla has published scores of articles and book chapters, including: and has also been quoted in USA Today.

- Sylla R. (1969), Federal Policy, Banking Market Structure, and Capital Mobilization in the United States. Journal of Economic History.
- Sylla R. (1975), Forgotten Men of Money: Private Bankers in Early US History. Journal of Economic History.
- Sylla R. (1985), Early American Banking: The Significance of the Corporate Form. Business and Economic History.
- Sylla R. (1998), US Securities Markets and the Banking System, 1790-1840. Federal Reserve Bank of St. Louis Review.
- Rousseau, P. & R. Sylla (2003). Financial Systems, Economic Growth, and Globalization. In M. Bordo, A. Taylor, and J. Williamson, eds. Globalization in Historican Perspective. University of Chicago Press.
- Sylla R. & R. Wright (2013), Corporation Formation in the United States 1790-1860. Business History.Sylla, R. (2024). Alexander Hamilton’s Report on Manufactures and Industrial Policy. Journal of Economic Perspectives.

== Personal life ==
Sylla resides in Hopkinton, New Hampshire, and New York City. He had been married to Edith Sylla, a historian of science, for sixty years at the time of her death in 2023.

His brother, James Sylla, a former president of Chevron U.S.A. Inc., died in the crash of Pacific Southwest Airlines Flight 1771 in 1987.
