= Eabh =

European Association for Banking and Financial History (eabh)
- Abbreviation: eabh
- Formation: 1954
- Founder: Wim Duisenberg, former President of De Nederlandsche Bank and former President of the European Central Bank
- Founded at: Frankfurt am Main, Germany
- Legal status: Active
- Location: Frankfurt am Main, Germany
- Fields: Financial history
- Chairman: Hugo Bänziger (International Committee of the Red Cross)
- Chairman of the Academic Council: Harold James (Princeton University)
- Board of directors: Agustín Carstens (Bank for International Settlements), Mario Draghi (European Central Bank), Walter Kielholz (Swiss Re)
- Website: bankinghistory.org

The European Association for Banking and Financial History (eabh) is an independent, non-profit association based in Frankfurt am Main. Founded in 1990, eabh aims to promote research on banking history; support the preservation historically valuable archive material of public and private banking institutions; and facilitate dialogue on key challenges and opportunities to the historical study of finance, insurance, and globalization. It maintains a global network of financial professionals and academics who meet to discuss and encourage projects in the field of financial and banking history. The eabh currently has 80 member organisations.

== Foundation ==
The European Association for Banking History e.V. (eabh) was founded on 29 November 1990 in an inaugural meeting at the premises of Deutsche Bank, in Frankfurt am Main, by 22 banking institutions and one academic institution from 20 European countries. Manfred Pohl, German business historian and head of ‘Historisches Institut der Deutschen Bank’ (1972–2000), was responsible for the creation of the forum that would lead to the foundation of eabh. During the ‘European Colloquium on Banking History’ held in Frankfurt on 9 February 1989 Pohl launched the idea of creating an association for banking history and decided to gather European scholars and banking institutions’ archivists in a working group to draft the first statutes. Other members of the first eabh Board of Management were Wilfried Guth, chairman of the Board of Patrons; Sir Evelyn de Rothschild, chairman; Herman Van der Wee, Chairman of the Academic Advisory Council; Pedro Martinez Mendez, Treasurer and Robert Lion, Member.

Wim Duisenberg, then president of De Nederlandsche Bank, opened the first annual eabh conference, ‘How to Write the History of a Bank’ on 16 September 1992. Two members of eabh, Youssef Cassis and Philip L. Cottrell, subsequently began the organisation's dedicated academic journal, the Financial History Review.

On 7 December 2000, eabh celebrated its 10th anniversary at a Deutsche Bank symposium, 'Banking in the Mirror of Time’. On 28 May 2004 the Association conducted a general survey in the 15th General Members’ Meeting and decided to change its name to eabh (European Association for Banking and Financial History e.V.), as a commitment to embracing financial history in a wider sense.

In 2018, eabh added its first member institution on the African continent, the Banco de Moçambique.

== Governance ==
The eabh is governed by the Board of Management and advised by the Board of Patrons and Academic Council. The primary decision-making body is the General Members' Assembly, which meets annually.

The Association's founder Manfred Pohl served as Deputy Chairman of the Board of Management from 1990 and was elected Honorary Chairman for life in 2015.

Past presidents of the organization include:

- 1990: Sir Evelyn de Rothschild, N M Rothschilds & Sons
- 2004: Wim Duisenberg, President of the European Central Bank
- 2006: Jean-Claude Trichet, President of the European Central Bank
- 2012: Hugo Bänziger, (International Committee of the Red Cross)

Past Chairman of eabh Academic Advisory Council include:

- 1990: Herman Van der Wee, University of Leuven
- 1998: Gabriel Tortella Casares, University of Alcalá, Madrid
- 2004: Gerald D. Feldman, University of California, Berkeley
- 2008: Peter Hertner, University of Halle-Wittenberg
- 2013: Harold James, Princeton University

== Activities ==
The eabh publishes studies and conference papers. It also organises numerous conferences, academic symposia, workshops and seminars in various European towns and locations. Every year they hold a main conference in which archivists, historians and representatives of the financial community from all over Europe come together to discuss matters of common interest.

=== Archives ===
In July 2014 eabh transferred its documents to the Historical Archives of the European Union (HAEU) in Florence. This material relates to the creation of the Association and includes the work of its governing bodies and its activities: workshop material, board meeting protocols, publication material and photographs.

=== Publications ===
The main publication of eabh is the triannual Financial History Review (FHR), published in tandem with Cambridge University Press. Founded in 1994, the FHR is the sole academic journal dedicated to financial, banking and monetary history. It regulately publishes original research that discus the intersections of history, finance, public policy, culture, and society. Alongside the FHR, eabh publishes a working paper series (since 2014), a book series, and a bulletin.

=== Conferences ===
The eabh hosts a number of conferences and workshops designed to bring together academics and scholars of financial and banking history. Often these conferences are co-sponsored with other non-profits, business organizations, corporations, central banks, or commercial banks. The discussions at these conferences aim to contribute to ongoing policy debates. Recent conferences include:

- October 2019, Minting History: Financial history at face value, with the Rothschild Archive
- October 2018, Institutional Investors: The history of professional fund management, with Schroders and Banque Lombard Odier
- October 2017, Money in Africa: Monetary and financial decolonisation in Africa in the 20th Century, with the Banco de Portugal and Banque de France
- June 2017, Legacy of finance: The legacy of the haute-banque in the world. From the 19th to the 21st century, with BNP Paribas
- May 2017, Innovation in archives & Innovative responses to financial crises, with the Federal Reserve Bank of St. Louis
- June 2012, European Association for Banking and Financial History Annual Conference, with National Bank of Romania

== See also ==
=== Organizations ===
- Business History Conference
- Economic History Association
- Economic History Society
- International Economic History Association

=== Publications ===
- Business History Review
- Economic History Review
- Enterprise & Society
- Journal of Economic History
