= Fred Bateman =

Economic historian (1937–2012)

James Fred Bateman, Jr. (1937 – January 10, 2012) was a noted economic historian. He served as the Nicholas A. Beadles Professor in the Terry College of Business at the University of Georgia. Bateman's main areas of research were US 19th century agricultural and industrial economic history. Bateman's teaching style was informal. However, while at Indiana University, Bateman alienated some students with his acerbic attempts at classroom humor. He served from 1982–83 as president of the Business History Conference and in 2010 he was elected as a Fellow of the Cliometric Society.

== Selected publications ==
- Atack, J. and Bateman, F. (1987). To their own soil: Agriculture in the Antebellum North. Ames: Iowa State University Press.
- Bateman, F., and Weiss, T. J. (1981). A deplorable scarcity: The failure of industrialization in the slave economy. Chapel Hill: University of North Carolina Press.
