= Business History Conference =

- Abbreviation: BHC
- Formation: 1954
- Legal status: Active
- Location: Wilmington, Delaware, United States
- Fields: Business history
- President: Edward Balleisen, Duke University
- Vice President: Neil Rollings, University of Glasgow
- Website: thebhc.org

The Business History Conference (BHC) is an academic organization that supports all aspects of research, writing, and teaching about business history and about the environment in which businesses operate. Founded in 1954, the BHC supports ongoing research among its members and holds conferences to bring together business and economic historians. It also publishes a quarterly academic journal, Enterprise & Society, along with selected papers from its annual meetings via BEH On-Line.

== History ==
The BHC was founded in 1954 as a series of meetings held at Northwestern University. Richard C. Overton, an American railroad historian, was the first president of the BHC. As cliometricians began dominating economic historian with quantitative methods, other scholars sought to retain the atheoretical, qualitative take on scholarship. The group of economic and business historians met again in 1956, 1958, and 1971, transforming itself into a full professional organization. According to Naomi Lamoreaux of Yale University, the BHC today is composed mainly of historians, while the Economic History Association of economists.

Today, approximately 30 percent of its membership resides outside North America. This reflects the increasingly global nature of the work of business history.

Former presidents of the BHC include:

- 2025-2026: Rowena Olegario, University of Oxford
- 2024-2025: Stephen Mihm, University of Georgia
- 2023-2024: Sharon Murphy, Providence College
- 2022-2023: Daniel Wadhwani, University of Southern California
- 2021-2022: Andrea Lluch, CONICET
- 2020-2021: Neil Rollings, University of Glasgow
- 2019-2020: Edward Balleisen Duke University
- 2018 to 2019: Teresa da Silva Lopes, University of York
- 2017 to 2018: Mary O'Sullivan, University of Geneva
- 2016 to 2017: Walter Friedman, Harvard Business School
- 2015 to 2016: Margaret B.W. Graham, McGill University
- 2014 to 2015: Mary Yeager, University of California, Los Angeles
- 2013 to 2014: Per H. Hansen, Copenhagen Business School
- 2012 to 2013: Kenneth Lipartito, Florida International University
- 2011 to 2012: Margaret Levenstein, University of Michigan
- 2010 to 2011: Richard R. John, Columbia University
- 2009 to 2010: Steven Tolliday, University of Leeds
- 2008 to 2009: Mark H. Rose, Florida Atlantic University
- 2007 to 2008: Pamela Laird, University of Colorado, Denver
- 2006 to 2007: William J. Hausman, College of William & Mary
- 2005 to 2006: Richard Sylla, New York University
- 2004 to 2005: JoAnne Yates, Massachusetts Institute of Technology
- 2003 to 2004: Patrick Fridenson, L’École des Hautes Études en Sciences Sociales
- 2002 to 2003: Philip Scranton, Rutgers University
- 2001 to 2002: Geoffrey Jones, Harvard Business School
- 2000 to 2001: Naomi Lamoreaux, Yale University
- 1999 to 2000: Larry Neal, University of Illinois at Urbana-Champaign
- 1998 to 1999: Jeremy Atack, Vanderbilt University
- 1997 to 1998: Leslie Hannah, London School of Economics
- 1996 to 1997: Mansel G. Blackford, Ohio State University
- 1995 to 1996: William H. Becker, George Washington University
- 1994 to 1995: Edwin J. Perkins, University of Southern California
- 1993 to 1994: Richard H. K. Vietor, Harvard Business School
- 1992 to 1993: K. Austin Kerr, Ohio State University
- 1991 to 1992: Louis Galambos, Johns Hopkins University
- 1990 to 1991: William Lazonick, University of Massachusetts-Lowell
- 1989 to 1990: Thomas K. McCraw, Harvard Business School
- 1988 to 1989: Wayne Broehl, Dartmouth College
- 1987 to 1988: Mira Wilkins, Florida International University
- 1986 to 1987: Glenn Porter
- 1985 to 1986: Morton Rothstein, University of California-Davis
- 1984 to 1985: Irene D. Neu Jones, Marietta College
- 1983 to 1984: Paul Uselding,
- 1982 to 1983: Fred Bateman, University of Georgia
- 1981 to 1982: Richard W. Barsness, Lehigh University
- 1980 to 1981: Harold D. Woodman, Purdue University
- 1979 to 1980: Thomas C. Cochran, University of Pennsylvania
- 1978 to 1979: Herman Freudenberger, Tulane University
- 1977 to 1978: Alfred D. Chandler, Harvard Business School
- 1976 to 1977: Donald L. Kemmerer, University of Illinois
- 1975 to 1976: Ross M. Robertson,
- 1974 to 1975: Herman E. Krooss, New York University
- 1973 to 1974: Harold F. Williamson,
- 1972 to 1973: Arthur M. Johnson,
- 1971 to 1972: Richard C. Overton,

== Organization ==
The BHC is a member of the International Economic History Association and an affiliated organization of the American Historical Association and of H-Net.

The organization also operates H-Business, one of the earliest H-Net discussion lists, and maintains an on-line full-text archives of its print proceedings journal, Business and Economic History. It also publishes The Exchange, a blog devoted to news of interest to business and economic historians. The BHC holds an annual meeting that provides a forum for discussing current research in business history and related fields and offers an opportunity for people with similar interests to meet and exchange ideas. Participation from overseas scholars is especially encouraged, and joint meetings with the European Business History Association are held regularly. The BHC sponsors a number of awards and prizes, including the Hagley Prize in Business History and the Cambridge Journals Article Prize; it endeavors to support scholars entering the field through its travel-to-meeting grants, its Doctoral Dissertation Colloquium, and its Krooss Dissertation Prize. Sub-groups within the organization promote the interests of women in business history, business historians teaching at business schools, and emerging scholars.
