= Engels' pause =

Historical economic period during the Industrial Revolution in Britain

Engels' pause is a term coined by economic historian Robert C. Allen to describe the period from 1790 to 1840, when British working-class wages stagnated and per-capita gross domestic product expanded rapidly during a technological upheaval. Allen named the period after German philosopher Friedrich Engels, who describes it in The Condition of the Working Class in England. Economists have analyzed its causes and effects since the nineteenth century, with some questioning its existence. Twenty-first-century technological upheaval and wage stagnation have led economists and academics to draw parallels between the two periods.

== Background ==
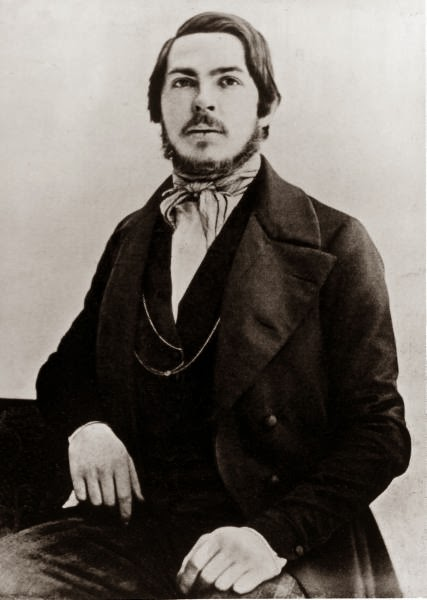
Friedrich Engels, author of The Condition of the Working Class in England

The Industrial Revolution, which occurred between the mid-18th and mid-19th centuries, led to an increase in Britain's urban population and economic output due to the modernisation of manufacturing and technology. As per-capita gross domestic product grew, real wages of the British working class remained relatively constant. Capitalists and financiers of new, large-scale manufacturing businesses accumulated the gains from economic development, using them to expand their industries.

British academic economists Charles Harley and Nicholas Crafts analysed the growth rates of industries and economic sectors in Britain during the Industrial Revolution in 1980, estimating per-capita growth at 46 percent between 1780 and 1840. South African-British economic historian Charles Feinstein found in 1990 that working-class wages during that same period increased by 12%, a noticeably slower and comparatively-stagnant rate.

Friedrich Engels, in his 1845 The Condition of the Working Class in England, highlighted the wealth disparity between the British industrialists and their workers. Robert C. Allen of New York University evaluated and substantiated Engels' account in his 2008 paper, in "Explorations in Economic History", coining the term "Engels' pause".

In the years following Engels' pause and the publication of The Condition of the Working Class in England, British wages began to rise with economic output. Between 1840 and 1900, output per worker increased by 90 percent and real wage growth increased by 123 percent. This pattern, in which labour productivity and wages increase at about the same rate, developed in Britain around the time that Engels wrote his book.

== Causes ==
Several explanations of Engels' pause exist, due to the dynamic nature of the British economy during the Industrial Revolution. During the revolution, classical economists provided theories explaining the wage stagnation. English scholar Thomas Robert Malthus proposed that technical progress would increase demand for labour, but this would be offset by an increase in population. German economist Karl Marx believed that technical progress, enhanced by a large amount of labour, would reduce demand for labour and prevent steady wage growth.

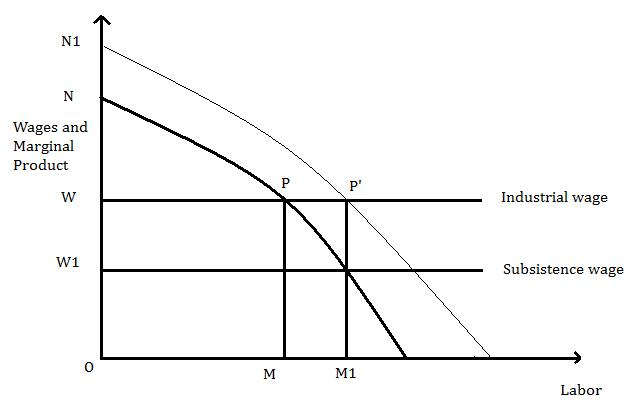
Model of wage growth during the period, according to the Lewis economic model

The first explanation of Engels' pause takes a macroeconomic approach, adopting the development model created by economist W. Arthur Lewis. The model shows a two-phase development process in an economic period, and divides the British economy into two sectors. In the agricultural sector, population exceeded capital output and the marginal product of labour was zero; the distribution of income from output amongst the population sustained livelihoods. Phase one shows the origins of Engels' pause, as surplus labour from the agricultural sector is absorbed into the modern sector to meet rapidly-increasing demand. The initially-more-prosperous segment is the technological sector, which encapsulates mass-manufacturing processes, new technology, and the rapidly-expanding urban population arising from the Industrial Revolution. The savings rate rose, as capitalists withheld part of their income and circulated the equity as investments to improve processes and develop technology. Capital accumulation ensured that the modern sector was continuously growing, and labour for the increasing capacity was infinitely available from the agricultural sector as the population moved from rural areas to the city (explaining the period's large-scale urbanisation). In this economic theory, the increase in the supply of labour meant a larger population among whom to divide wages. This kept wages stagnant as profits increased, leading to a snowball effect of capital accrual. The trend ends when the expanding sector absorbs the labour surplus; as it continues to grow, wages increase and Engels' pause ends.

The second approach looks at specific industries, including laws and occurrences in them which would have affected British wage growth. At the beginning of the 19th century, the Napoleonic Wars raised the prices of wheat and other agricultural products and hampered the growth of real wages. The Corn Laws, a series of tariffs on the import and export of grain which were designed to keep prices high, also ensured that wages remained stagnant. As the American grain invasion occurred in 1870 and the British and North American grain markets were integrated, the previous effects were mitigated and wages began to rise.

A third explanation, put forward by Carl Benedikt Frey, is that the early inventions of the Industrial Revolution were predominantly labor-replacing: "If technology replaces labor in existing tasks, wages and the share of national income accruing to labor may fall. If, in contrast, technological change is augmenting labor, it will make workers more productive in existing tasks or create entirely new labor-intensive activities, thereby increasing the demand for labor. The divergence between output and wages, in other words, is consistent with this being a period where technology was primarily replacing. Artisan workers in the domestic system were replaced by machines, often tended by children—who had very little bargaining power and often worked without wages. The growing capital share of income meant that the gains from technological progress were very unequally distributed: corporate profits were captured by industrialists, who reinvested them in factories and machines."

This pattern, Frey argues, becomes murkier over the course of the nineteenth century: "by the 1850s, the participation of children in the workforce had fallen dramatically. Quite possibly, the Factory Acts of the 1830s, which regulated working hours and improved the conditions of children in the factories, increased the cost of child labor and thus spurred the adoption of steam power, though causality might equally have run in the other direction. Regardless, the more widespread adoption of steam power from the 1830s onward, and the subsequent arrival of machines of greater size, meant that more-skilled operatives were required: the complementarity between factory equipment and the human capital necessary to operate it grew stronger as machines became more complex. Contemporaries like Peter Gaskell had already observed this tendency in the 1830s: Gaskell asserted that “since steam-weaving became so general as to supersede the hand-loom, the number of adults engaged in the mills have been progressively advancing; inasmuch that very young children are no longer competent to take charge of a steam-loom.”"

== Effects ==
=== Economic effects ===
Before the Industrial Revolution, British industries were generally small-scale. Textile production relied on thousands of individual manufacturers, including spinners, weavers and dyers, who worked in their homes. Changes in steam technology revolutionised transport and manufacturing processes in Britain, allowing large-scale manufacturing and transportation and increasing industrial output. The construction of large factories allowed mass employment in one building, increasing labour efficiency and output.

Engels' pause allowed for the accrual of profits from output by capitalists and industrialists; these profits were returned to their industries to continue the expansion and development of new manufacturing processes and technology. Britain's gross domestic product increased steadily, with profits on business capital estimated at 12-16 percent during the 1850s. The share of income allotted to labour dropped from 50 percent in 1801 to 45 percent in 1845, with the rate of return to capital rising over 20 percent from the late 18th to the mid-19th century.

=== Social effects ===
Working and living conditions during Engels' pause were poor, since the rate of urbanisation exceeded the rate of growth in labour demand. New processes and technologies in agriculture rendered traditional processes obsolete, and a surplus of cheap agricultural labour led to unemployment and increasing poverty in many rural areas (encouraging urbanisation). The increase in capital as a result of the Industrial Revolution led to increased demand for labour as a growing number of people moved to urban centres in search of employment. The large increase in urban population led to high unemployment; over 1.5 million people were unemployed in Great Britain during the early Industrial Revolution. Capitalists and industrialists accumulated and maintained wealth, and the working classes lived in overcrowded environments. The new urban population consisted of displaced agricultural workers, most of whom were unskilled; much of Parliament's attention was directed towards regulating and capitalising on technological developments and capital gain, and harsh treatment, long working hours and low wages were standard. Skilled labourers, such as weavers, found themselves redundant as new machinery usurped their roles. Women spent less time working in the family home, and took jobs in the domestic-service and textile industries. Children worked in factories to meet the demand for labour and contribute to family income.

Living conditions for a large part of the working class were poor due to rapid urbanisation. Overcrowding led to poor sanitation; low wages resulted in poor diets for those who could not afford fresh food, and diseases such as cholera, tuberculosis and typhoid became common.

== Controversy ==
Economic historians in the 20th and the 21st centuries who study the Industrial Revolution differ on whether wages remained stagnant or grew with gains from capital. They question the existence of Engels' pause since comprehensive economic data from the period is difficult to find. According to Gregory Clark of the University of California, real wage growth in early-19th-century England was underestimated and GDP growth was overestimated. An inaccurate view of wage growth compared to GDP growth was presented, and wages grew more than per-capita output. Relatedly, a comparison of real annual earnings and GDP per capita by Jane Humphries and Jacob Weisdorf suggests that Engels' pause largely disappears when changes in the length of the working year are taken into account. Economic writer Tim Worstall questioned whether profit was accrued entirely by capitalists or it was fed into worker income and not accurately recorded.

== 21st century ==
The 19th-century Industrial Revolution was an all-encompassing societal transformation, from technology and culture to the economy. The changes caused by industrialisation required the principles of society to be redesigned. Engels' pause was accompanied by major changes in the social security and party systems, elementary schools, urban planning, public transport and many other areas of society. It has been argued that a similar transformation is underway in industrialised Western nations, where digitisation and robotisation are transforming society. In the Western world, particularly the United States and the United Kingdom, the 2010s may be seen as the beginning of a similar "pause" in which the position of workers and the capacity of current systems to maintain the development of society are (at least temporarily) weakened.

Economists and businesspeople have associated the trends observed in Engels' pause with present-day conditions such as the role of technology and its continuous development, inequality in the global distribution of wealth and the changing nature of the workforce. According to the Demos Helsinki think tank, society and the economy is changing as it did during the Industrial Revolution. During industrialisation, productivity began to increase as society and business were designed in accordance with the new modes of operation; this eventually led to an unprecedented period of prosperity. Two social classes were born: the working class (whose living conditions were that which a large part of 20th-century politics revolved around improving) and the middle class, whose expansion was an important result of increased in prosperity triggered by industrialisation and political reform. The birth of political parties and urban planning can be dated to the beginning of industrialisation. Digitisation and robotisation may have begun a decades-long period of transformation comparable to the Industrial Revolution during which the basic structures of society and forms of livelihood may change and wealth may be radically redistributed.

Bank of England Governor Mark Carney spoke at the April 2018 Public Policy Forum testimonial dinner in Toronto about his concern that rapidly-increasing technology in blue- and white-collar jobs would result in poor wage growth, worker redundancy and excessive capital accrual for owners of the machines. The economic reporter Cardiff Garcia presents a similar view by correlating the stagnation in real wage growth seen during Engels' pause to the present unequal distribution of wealth. Robert C. Allen has also reflected on similarities between 19th-century industrialisation and today. Erik Brynjolfsson and Andrew McAfee have examined a similar phenomenon in their 2014 book, The Second Machine Age. In The Technology Trap, Carl Benedikt Frey argues that advanced economies are in a new Engels' pause and compares the experience of the Industrial Revolution in England to the post-1980 Computer Revolution.
