= Jeremy Atack =

American economic historian (born 1949)

Jeremy Atack (born 16 January 1949) is an American economic historian known for his work on the history of industrialization in the 19th century in the United States. He is Research Professor Emeritus of Economics at Vanderbilt University, a research associate at the National Bureau of Economic Research, and a Fellow of the Cliometric Society. He has been president of the Economic History Association, the Agricultural History Society, and the Business History Conference.

== Early life and education ==
Atack was born on January 16, 1949. He received his B.A. from Jesus College of the University of Cambridge in 1971 and his Ph.D. from Indiana University Bloomington in 1976.

== Career ==
Atack is Research Professor Emeritus of Economics at Vanderbilt University, a research associate at the National Bureau of Economic Research, a Fellow of the Cliometric Society, and was the Kinkhead Research Scholar at the University of Illinois (1992–1993). He is a noted academic economic historian whose primary research focus is on 19th century US industrialization. He has been president of the Economic History Association (2011–2012), the Agricultural History Society (2003–2004) and the Business History Conference (1999).

Atack has won five research grants from the National Science Foundation and received the Clio Can award from the Cliometric Society in recognition of his work in cliometrics.

== Selected publications ==
- Estimation of Economies of Scale in Nineteenth Century United States Manufacturing, New York: Garland Publishing Inc., 1985, pp. 246.
- To Their Own Soil: American Agriculture in the Antebellum North, Ames, IA: Iowa State University Press, 1987, pp. 327 (with Fred Bateman). Republished 2002.
- A New Economic View of American History. NY: W.W. Norton, 1994, 2nd edition, pp 714 (with Peter Passell)
