= Naomi Lamoreaux =

American economic historian

Naomi R. Lamoreaux
- Born: 1950 (age 75–76)

Academic background
- Doctoral advisor: Louis Galambos; Carl F. Christ

Naomi Raboy Lamoreaux (born 1950) is an American economic historian, specializing in US business and technological history. She is the Stanley B. Resor Professor of Economics and History at Yale University and an emeritus professor at UCLA and Research Associate at the National Bureau of Economic Research. She has worked widely on business, economic, and financial history with perhaps her most noted works being her 1988 book The Great Merger Movement in American Business, 1895-1904 and her 1996 book Insider Lending: Banks, Personal Connections and her Economic Development in Industrial New England. Lamoreaux was elected to the presidencies of both the Business History Conference and the Economic History Association. She has been awarded several prizes for her academic work including the Arthur Cole article prize and the Cliometric Society's Clio Can. She has served on the editorial boards for numerous journals in the field of economic history, including the Journal of Economic History, Journal of Economic Perspectives, Essays in Economic and Business History, and Capitalism and History.

== Selected publications ==
- Lamoreaux, Naomi R. (1988) The Great Merger Movement in American Business, 1895-1904, Cambridge University Press
- Lamoreaux, Naomi R. (1996) Insider Lending: Banks, Personal Connections, and Economic Development in Industrial New England, Cambridge University Press
