= Time on the Cross: The Economics of American Negro Slavery =

1974 book

- Authors: Robert Fogel; Stanley Engerman
- Subject: Economics of slavery
- Publisher: Little, Brown and Company
- Publication date: 1974
- Media type: Print
- Pages: 306
- ISBN: 0-393-31218-6

Time on the Cross: The Economics of American Negro Slavery (1974) is a quantitative study of slavery by the economists Robert Fogel and Stanley L. Engerman. The book argued that slavery was an economically rational institution and that the economic exploitation of slaves was not as catastrophic as presumed, because there were financial incentives for slaveholders to maintain a basic level of material support for those they held as property. It was controversial and attracted media attention as it contradicted the long-standing notion that slavery was economically inefficient, underdeveloped the Southern United States, and was on the path to extinction before the American Civil War broke out.

== Content ==
The scholar Thomas L. Haskell wrote in 1975 that Time on the Cross had two main themes: to revise the history of slavery and to support the use of the scientific method in history.

The book directly challenged the long-held conclusions that American slavery was unprofitable, a moribund institution, inefficient, and extremely harsh for the typical slave. The authors proposed that slavery before the Civil War was economically efficient and profitable, especially in the case of the South, which grew commodity crops such as cotton, tobacco, and sugar. These types of crops were usually grown on plantations that employed a gang system of labor, which was closely monitored and considered more efficient than task-based work by smaller groups.

Fogel wrote that slave farms were just as productive as free farms. He said that the large plantation-style slave farms (16+ slaves) were the most efficient due to economies of scale, having a Total Factor Productivity ratio (A_{i}/A_{j}) to be around 1.33. Fogel also wrote that if slaves had a day of rest, they tended to be more efficient because of the extra day of rest. They would be able to regain their energy and thus have more energy to produce more. "In their revised view slaves were hard working; slave labor was of superior quality. Indeed, this helps explain why large slave plantations were much more efficient than free Southern farms." In addition, since different crops were grown in the South and the North, he noted that although slavery was efficient in the South, it would not have been so in the North due to different weather and other conditions.

The authors predicted that if slavery had not been abolished, the price of slaves would have continued to rise rapidly in the late 19th century as more land was put into production for cotton. The book compares conditions and economics in the "Old South" (Atlantic Coastal states) with the "New South" (areas farther west, commonly called the Deep South). It evaluates available statistics to shed light on slave life. The authors point out that following emancipation and the end of the Civil War, the life expectancy of freedmen declined by 10 percent, and their illnesses increased by 20 percent, over slavery times. (At the same time, there was considerable social dislocation across the South following the widespread destruction of the war and loss of life among a generation of men. White militias directly attacked and intimidated freedmen, and with the agricultural economy being decimated, causing widespread problems and suffering among the entire population.)

The authors evaluated the Slave Narrative Collection, oral interviews conducted by the Federal Writers' Project of the Works Progress Administration, United States Census information, and other statistical data to assert that many slaves were encouraged to marry and maintain households, they were given garden plots, the dehumanizing practice of "slave breeding" was virtually non-existent, the quality of their daily diets and medical care were comparable to the white population, and many trusted slaves were given great responsibility in managing plantations. This was in contrast to other accounts of the dehumanizing effects of slavery.

Fogel and Engerman wrote: "[S]lave owners expropriated far less than generally presumed, and over the course of a lifetime a slave field hand received approximately ninety percent of the income produced."(p. 5-6) They were estimating the value of housing, clothing, food and other benefits received by the slaves and argued that they lived as well in material terms as did free urban laborers; life was difficult for both classes.

The authors acknowledged their thesis was controversial and emphasized that their goal was not to justify slavery. Rather, they asserted, their goal was to counter myths about the character of black Americans—myths they said had gained currency in the antebellum slavery debate and had survived into the civil rights era. These myths, the authors wrote, had their genesis in racist attitudes widely shared by both abolitionists and defenders of slavery. Myths included perceptions that black Americans were lazy, promiscuous, untrustworthy and lacked natural ability.

== Reception ==
The book received unusually broad mainstream media attention for a work of economic history; its revisionism in the decade following some achievements by the civil rights movement caused controversy. It was a seminal work in generating debate within the fields of economics and history. As Thomas J. Weiss noted in 2001,

It is a rare monograph in economic history that gets reviewed in magazines and newspapers such as Newsweek, Time, The Atlantic Monthly, The New York Times, The Wall Street Journal and The Washington Post among others; or whose authors appear on television talk shows. Robert Fogel and Stanley Engerman's 'Time on the Cross' was one such book – perhaps the only one.

Many in the historical community were impressed with the authors' application of cliometrics. In general historians and economists agree with the conclusion that slavery was efficient and economically viable but had more mixed attitudes towards the material well being of slaves.

== Criticism and praise ==
In a 1975 review of three works critical of the book, Thomas Haskell of The New York Review of Books said that Time on the Cross "at first seemed exceptionally important, if contentious, [but] now appears at least to be severely flawed and possibly not even worth further attention by serious scholars."

In 1975, the historian Herbert Gutman published Slavery and the Numbers Game in which he criticized Fogel and Engerman on a host of issues. He challenged their use of limited evidence for systematic and regular rewards, and their failure to consider the effect public whipping would have on other slaves. He argued that Fogel and Engerman had mistakenly assumed that slaves had assimilated the Protestant work ethic. If they had such an ethic, then the system of punishments and rewards outlined in Time on the Cross would support Fogel and Engerman's thesis. Gutman's thesis was that most slaves had not adopted this ethic at all, and that slavery's carrot-and-stick approach to work was not part of the slave worldview. He also claimed that much of the mathematics in the text is incorrect and often uses insufficient measurements. Historian Edward Pessen wrote in 1985, "A major problem with the findings of Fogel and Engerman, in addition to flaws in their data, mathematical errors, and lapses from logic that are apparent even to general readers, is the harsh critical reaction to their work by their fellow cliometricians, who have attacked the 'persistent [theoretical] bias' in their study, its lack of a 'scientific foundation,' and its needlessly difficult and inaccurate equations, among other faults."

In American Slavery, the historian Peter Kolchin suggests that the economists did not fully consider the costs of the forced migration of more than one million slaves from the Upper South to the Deep South, where they were sold to cotton plantations. He wrote that the book was a "flash in the pan, a bold but now discredited work."

In 2001, calling it that "rare" book that has withstood "the onslaught of unrelenting, withering criticism," Thomas Weiss, who served as editor of the Journal of Economic History, and the Executive Director of the Economic History Association, wrote that the book made quantitative "results more widely known among the general public and integrating that information into their bold, new vision of the way the slave system functioned." The book's reissue in 1995 at its twentieth anniversary prompted new symposia and roundtables to discuss the material. New scholarly articles and books have been published that use similar methods to evaluate such factors as the physical stature of slaves (related to their health and material well-being) and their standard of living.

In regard to the work's influence, Weiss added that "Moreover, many economic historians, in both economics and history departments, agree with the major conclusions put forth by Fogel and Engerman."

Michael Tadman wrote that Time on the Cross is "widely accepted as establishing the profitability of American slavery—indeed as establishing that slave‐based agriculture was profitable not just on virgin land but in the older slave‐exporting states too." However, in the context of the historiography of the slave trade, Fogel and Engerman surface "only the mildest version of the abolitionist critique of slave treatment," and Tadman finds that their inferences about "black and white mentalities and relationships were, however, far less convincing."

== Publication ==
The book was published in two volumes.

The book was reprinted in 1995 at its twentieth anniversary.
