= Thomas Weiss =

Thomas Weiss may refer to:

- Thomas G. Weiss (born 1946), scholar of international relations
- Thomas J. Weiss (born 1942), professor of economics
