= Bob Allen (economic historian) =

Economic historian (born 1947)

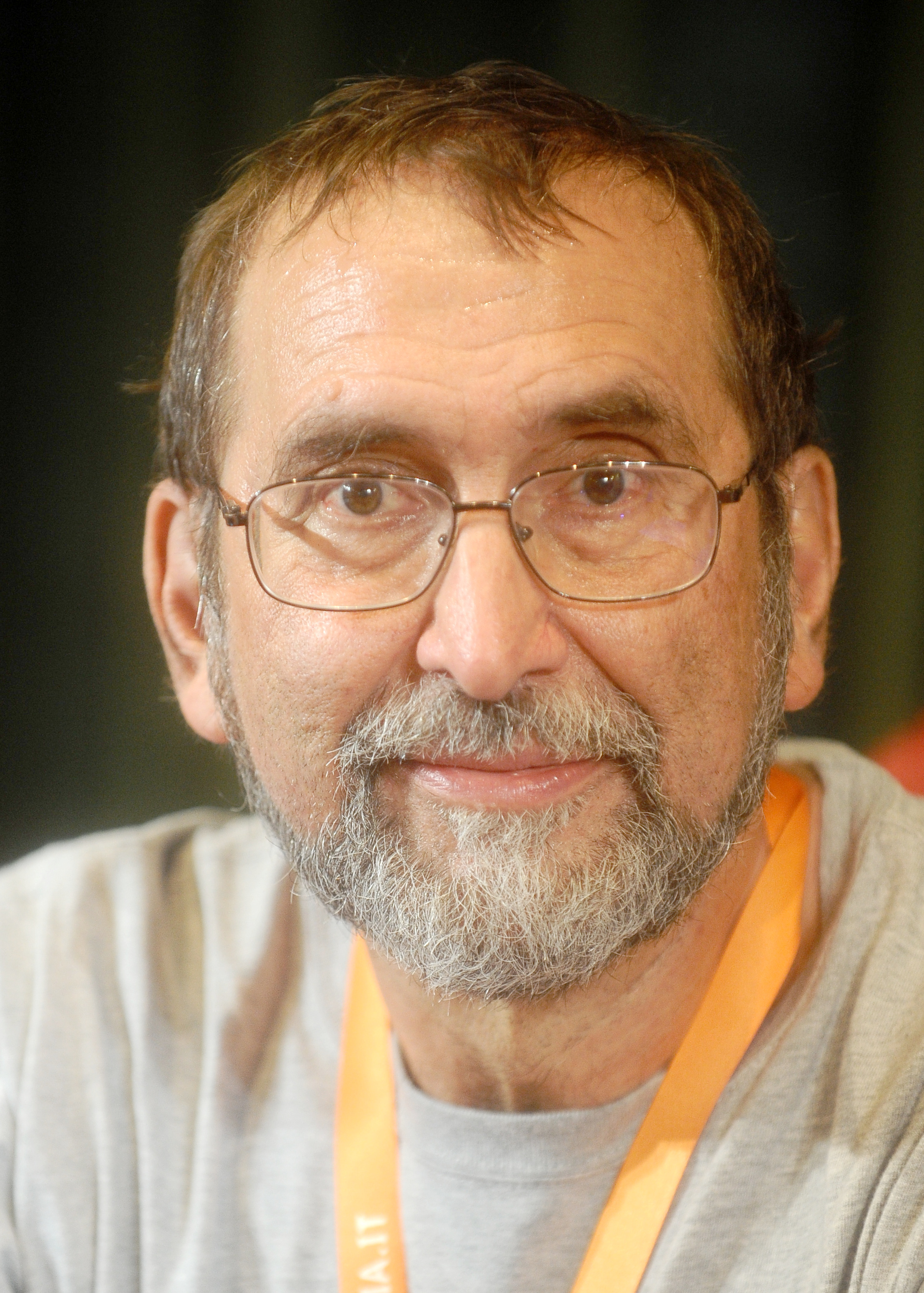
Bob Allen at the Festival of Economics in Trento in 2018

Robert Carson Allen (born 10 January 1947 in Salem, Massachusetts) is Professor of Economic History at New York University Abu Dhabi.

His research interests are economic history, technological change and public policy and he has written extensively on English agricultural history. He has also studied international competition in the steel industry, the extinction of Bowhead Whales in the Eastern Arctic, and contemporary policies on education.

Robert C. Allen is widely recognized as a leading figure in the field of economic history. His extensive research on topics such as the Industrial Revolution, global economic development, and historical living standards has been central to this research literature for the last decades.

== Education ==
Allen obtained his B.A. at Carleton College in Minnesota in 1969. He then earned his Ph.D. in economic history from Harvard University in 1975 with a dissertation on International Competition and the Growth of the British Iron and Steel Industry, 1830–1913. His doctoral research was initially funded by the American Iron and Steel Institute and examined the growth of the British iron and steel industry in the 19th century, foreshadowing his later interest in industrial development.

== Career ==
Allen has been a professor since 1973, first at Hamilton College, then from 1975 in the Department of Economics of the University of British Columbia, where he taught for over two decades. In 1993–1994 he was a visiting professor at Harvard University. Starting in 2000, he was associated with the University of Oxford, and from 2002–2013 was Professor of Economic History and a fellow of Nuffield College.

Allen was president of the Economic History Association in 2012–2013, and retired from Oxford University in 2013. Upon retirement, Allen assumed the position of Global Distinguished Professor of Economic History at New York University Abu Dhabi, a post he currently holds. He also remains a Senior Research Fellow at Nuffield College, Oxford, maintaining an active presence in scholarly research.

Allen has been recognized with numerous honors and leadership roles. He was elected a Fellow of the Royal Society of Canada in 1994 and a Fellow of the British Academy in 2003.

He has been awarded the Ranki Prize of the Economic History Association for his 1992 and 2003 works (see below). He was also awarded the Arthur H. Cole Prize (1979–1980) and Explorations Prize (2001–2003, 2009) for outstanding research articles in economic history journals.

His book British Industrial Revolution in Global Perspective was selected as a Book of the Year by the Economist and Times Literary Supplement in 2009.

== Research and contributions ==
Robert C. Allen’s research has spanned a broad range of topics in economic history and development, with a unifying goal of understanding why some nations become rich while others remain poor.

He is particularly known for his explanations of the British Industrial Revolution and the historical divergence in global economic development. Allen’s landmark book The British Industrial Revolution in Global Perspective (2009) argues that Britain’s industrial takeoff was driven by a “high-wage economy” coupled with cheap energy resources (especially abundant coal). According to this thesis, by the eighteenth century British wages were relatively high while fuel was inexpensive, creating strong incentives for firms to develop labor-saving, coal-fueled technologies that propelled industrialization.

His high-wage economy theory has been highly influential in economic history, sparking debate and prompting further research into regional wage and price data in early modern Europe. Allen’s analysis highlighted how key inventions – such as the steam engine, the spinning jenny, and the coke-fired blast furnace – substituted capital and coal for labor, breaking the constraints of the traditional agrarian economy.

In related work, Allen coined the term “Engels’ pause” to describe the period from approximately 1790 to 1840 when British working-class real wages stagnated even as output per capita grew rapidly during the Industrial Revolution. This concept, named after Friedrich Engels’ observation of workers’ plight, underscores the delayed improvement in living standards for laborers in the early decades of industrial growth and has become a staple idea in discussions of inequality during industrialization.

Beyond Britain, Allen has been a key figure in debates about the Great Divergence – the economic gap that opened between industrializing Western Europe and other world regions. He has assembled and analyzed long-term data on real wages, prices, and standards of living across Europe and Asia from the 17th to 19th centuries. His findings demonstrated that by the 1700s, workers in parts of Northwestern Europe (especially England and the Netherlands) enjoyed significantly higher real wages than their counterparts in, for example, China or India. Allen argues that these material differences in income levels and resource costs were fundamental to why the Industrial Revolution began in Britain and not elsewhere, challenging explanations that focus solely on culture or institutions.

Allen has also made significant contributions to understanding pre-industrial agriculture and its relation to economic development. His first major book, Enclosure and the Yeoman (1992), offered a revisionist account of England’s Agricultural Revolution. In this study, Allen argues that most of the gains in agricultural productivity occurred well before the classic age of enclosure in the 18th century, largely due to improvements made by small-scale yeoman farmers in the early modern period. He also reversed a common assumption about causality: rather than agricultural progress enabling industrialization, Allen posited that the growth of cities and industrial demand stimulated changes in agriculture (for example, higher urban wages drew labor off the land and increased demand for food, which in turn incentivized agricultural innovation).

In addition to his work on Britain and Europe, Allen has deeply investigated the economic history of the Soviet Union. His book Farm to Factory: A Reinterpretation of the Soviet Industrial Revolution (2003) analyzes the Soviet economic experience from the 1920s to the 1980s. Allen’s research in this area highlights the extraordinary industrial growth the USSR achieved through the forced mobilization of resources—shifting millions of workers “from farm to factory” and prioritizing heavy industry investments. Farm to Factory challenged earlier assessments by suggesting that, up to a point, Soviet central planning was economically effective in achieving industrialization, even if it was attained at great human cost and was not sustainable in the long run.

Allen’s body of work spans agricultural history, industrialization, labor markets, and international development. He has shaped understanding of how and why the economic fortunes of societies evolve over time.

== Books ==
- 1992: Enclosure and the Yeoman: The Agricultural Development of the South Midlands, 1450-1850
- 2003: Farm to Factory: A Re-interpretation of the Soviet Industrial Revolution
- 2007: Engels' Pause: A Pessimist`s Guide to the British Industrial Revolution, Economics Series Working Papers 315, University of Oxford, Department of Economics.
- 2009: The British Industrial Revolution in Global Perspective
- 2011: Global economic history: a very short introduction
- 2017: The Industrial Revolution: a very short introduction

== See also ==
- Engels' pause
- List of historians
- List of economic historians
