= Hugo Bänziger =

Swiss manager and economist

- Born: January 3, 1956
- Education: University of Bern (PhD in Economic History)
- Occupations: Economist, Bank manager
- Organization(s): Deutsche Bank, Lombard Odier, John D.V. Salvador Foundation, CountryRisk.io, International Committee of the Red Cross (ICRC)

Hugo Bänziger (born 3 January 1956) is a Swiss economist and bank manager.

He held the position of chief risk officer on the management board of Deutsche Bank from 2006 to 2012 and was a member of the group executive committee. Bänziger resigned from the management board of Deutsche Bank at the end of May 2012.

From 2014 until the end of 2018, Hugo Bänziger was a managing partner of the Swiss private bank Lombard Odier. Hugo Bänziger is also a board member of the John D.V. Salvador Foundation (JDVSF), of the advisory board of CountryRisk.io. and a member of the International Committee of the Red Cross (ICRC).

== Life ==
Hugo Bänziger studied modern history, law and economics at the University of Bern, where he also achieved a PhD in economic history. After his studies, he began his career at the Swiss Federal Banking Commission (SFBC) in 1983. From 1985 to 1996, Hugo Bänziger worked for Credit Suisse in Zurich and London in the Retail Banking division and then as a Relationship Manager in the Corporate Finance division. In 1990 he was appointed Global Head of Credit for CS Financial Products.

In 1996, he joined Deutsche Bank, initially as head of global markets credit in London. In 2000, he was appointed Chief Credit Officer; from 2004, he was also responsible for operational risk management. On 4 May 2006, he was appointed to the management board of Deutsche Bank AG as chief risk officer. His responsibilities included the management of credit, market price and operational risks as well as Corporate Security & Business Continuity and Treasury. From May 2007, he was also responsible for Legal and Compliance.

Hugo Bänziger is a member of the supervisory board of EUREX Clearing AG, EUREX Frankfurt AG and president of the board of directors of EUREX Zürich AG. In November 2012, he was co-opted as a member of the International Committee of the Red Cross. He is an associate professor at the University of Chicago Booth School of Business and a visiting professor at the London School of Economics. He was chairman of the supervisory board of DWS Investment GmbH. On 1 April 2014, he became managing partner of the private bank Bank Lombard Odier & Co, a position he held until his departure at the end of 2018.

He has been chairman of the eabh since 2012.

In July 2017, eleven former senior executives at Deutsche Bank, including Bänziger, voluntarily waived EUR 38.4 million of their deferred pay in order to settle a dispute with the bank over past regulatory failings. The executives kept their entitlement to a further EUR 31.4 million over the following years and Deutsche Bank stated that they had "always administered their office with due care and that they cannot be accused of any breach of duty."

== Publications ==
- Hugo Bänziger (Hrsg.): Die Entwicklung der Bankenaufsicht in der Schweiz seit dem 19. Jahrhundert. Haupt Verlag, Bern 1986, ISBN 3-258-03563-6
