= Manfred Pohl =

German business historian

Professor Manfred Pohl (born 26 May 1944) is a German business historian. He is the author of over thirty corporate history books, as well as numerous articles and chapters. He has also published a number of poems and short stories. Manfred Pohl is an honorary professor at the Goethe University Frankfurt, Germany. He is also the founder of the organization My Europe 2100 and the Frankfurter Zukunftsrat.

== Biography ==
Manfred Pohl was born on 26 May 1944 in the town of Bliesransbach, near Saarbrücken in the Saarland region of Germany. After completing an apprenticeship at the Saarland Credit Bank, he studied German, History, Philosophy and Economics. In 1972, he was awarded a doctorate for his thesis on the history of banking in the Saarland.

Between 1972 and 2001, Manfred Pohl led the Historical Institute of Deutsche Bank. From 1981 he lectured at the Goethe University Frankfurt, Germany, leading courses on Corporate History and Corporate Culture. In 1992 he was awarded an honorary professorship by the university's School of Finance.

In addition to his academic position and his work at Deutsche Bank, Manfred Pohl has founded numerous nonprofit organizations including eabh (The European Association for Banking and Financial History), founded in 1990, the Institute for Corporate Culture Affairs, founded in 2001 and the Frankfurter Zukunftsrat, founded in 2008.

In 1998 he founded Europoint, which supported the introduction of the Euro currency in the twelve EU countries that originally adopted the currency in 1999/2001. Activities of note included the "Euro-World" project, a competition where over 1000 children suffering from cancer painted designs for the forthcoming Euro coins. Fourteen winning designs were purchased by the European Central Bank, of which two remain on display at the Bank, with the other twelve being donated back to the hospitals of the children who created the designs. Europoint also commissioned the illuminated Euro sign that stands outside the European Central Bank in Frankfurt. After Europoint was dissolved in 2002, ownership of the sign was transferred to the then newly formed Frankfurter Kultur Komitee.

Manfred Pohl has written numerous histories of German companies and business ventures, among them Deutsche Bank, M. DuMont Schauberg, Hochtief and the Baghdad Railway. He has also authored and edited works on economic and social themes, especially related to corporate social responsibility and business history (see publications list below).

== Awards ==
- 2001 - European Culture Prize
- 2011 - German Federal Order of Merit, First Class (Bundesverdienstkreuz, 1. Klasse)

== Publications and edited works in English ==
- Responsible Business: How to Manage a CSR Strategy Successfully, Ed. with Nick Tolhurst, Wiley, Chichester 2010
- The A to Z of Corporate Social Responsibility, Ed. with W. Visser, D. Matten and Nick Tolhurst, Wiley, Chichester 2007
- The ICCA Handbook on Corporate Social Responsibility, with Nick Tolhurst, Wiley, Chichester 2006
- Merger of Equals, Munich 2004

== Selected publications and edited works in German ==
- Das Ende des Weißen Mannes [The End of the White Man], Berlin/Bonn 2007
- Sicherheit auf Schiene und Straße. Die Geschichte der Knorr-Bremse AG, [Safety on Rail and Road: The History of the Knorr Brake Company], München 2005
- Requiem auf eine Währung. Die Mark 1873–2001, [Requiem to a Currency: The German Mark 1873-2001], Ed. with Carl-Ludwig Holtfrerich & Harold James, München 2002
- Die Geschichte der Südzucker AG (1926–2001) [The History of the Südzucker Company], München 2001
- Hochtief und seine Geschichte Hochtief and its History], With Birgit Siekmann, München 2000
- Von Stambul nach Bagdad - die Geschichte einer berühmten Eisenbahn [From 'stambul to Baghdad - The History of a Famous Railway Line], München 1999
- Die Deutsche Bank in London (1873 bis 1998), München 1998
