= Pat Hudson =

British historian

Pat Hudson FBA
- Born: 1948 (age 77–78); Barrow-in-Furness, Lancashire, England
- Occupations: Historian and academic

Academic background
- Education: London School of Economics; University of York

Academic work
- Discipline: History
- Sub-discipline: Industrial Revolution; Economic history; Social history; Cultural history
- Institutions: Cardiff University

Pat Hudson FBA (born 1948) is a British historian and academic. She is a Professor Emeritus of History at Cardiff University.

In 2022, she was elected a Fellow of the British Academy (FBA), the United Kingdom's national academy for the humanities and social sciences.

== Life ==
Hudson was born in 1948 in Barrow-in-Furness, Lancashire. Her father worked there as a joiner.

In 1971, Hudson was awarded a B.Sc. Economics from the London School of Economics and this was followed in 1981 by a PhD in Economic History from the University of York. She began an academix career by teaching for a year at the University of Leeds from 1975, and then was at the University of Liverpool from 1976 to 1997, being given a personal chair in 1993. She moved to the University of Cardiff as Professor of History in 1997.

== Research ==
Pat Hudson is a British economic historian and one of the world-leading authorities on the Industrial Revolution whose research has focused on the wider economic, social and cultural aspects of the industrialisation process. She has advanced and changed the field in a number of areas, including the formation of fixed and circulating capital and the role of the wool textile industry in British economic growth; proto-industrialisation, local history and micro history; the diversity of regional experience during industrialisation and the dynamic created by intra- and inter-regional specialisation and trade. She has also contributed to the critique of conventional measures of industrialisation and comparative economic growth and change over time (e.g. historical applications of national income accounting, GDP, and the Gini coefficient) and to the historiography of economic and social history in relation to time and space, particularly highlighting anachronistic and ethnocentric analysis. Her current work critiques the preoccupation with economic growth in economic history emphasising distribution (income and capital inequalities) and sustainability. Hudson served as President of the Economic History Society from 2001 to 2004 and subsequently as Director (2006–11) and Chair of the Governors (2011–17) of the Pasold Research Fund.

== Selected publications ==
- Berg, M., & Hudson, P. (2023). Slavery, capitalism and the industrial revolution. John Wiley & Sons.
- Pat Hudson (2020) Reinventing the Economic History of Industrialisation, co-ed with Kristine Bruland, Anne Gerritsen, Giorgio Riello (Montreal: McGill-Queen’s UP).
- Pat Hudson (2017) History by Numbers: An Introduction to Quantitative Approaches, co-ed. with Mina Ishizu (London: Bloomsbury).
- Pat Hudson (2016) The Routledge Handbook of Global Economic History, co-ed. with Francesco Boldizzoni (London, Routledge).
- Pat Hudson (2016) The Contradictions of Capital in the Twenty-first Century: the Piketty Opportunity, co-ed. with Keith Tribe (Newcastle: Agenda Publishing).
- Pat Hudson (2001) Living Economic and Social History: Essays to Mark the 75th Anniversary of the Economic History Society (Glasgow: Economic History Society).
- Pat Hudson (1992) The Industrial Revolution (London: Edward Arnold), transl. into five languages.
- Pat Hudson (1989) Regions and industries: a perspective on the industrial revolution in Britain (Cambridge: Cambridge University Press).
- Pat Hudson (1986) The Genesis of Industrial Capital: A Study of the West Riding Wool Textile Industry, c.1750-1850 (Cambridge: Cambridge University Press).
