= International Monetary Cooperation Since Bretton Woods =

1996 book by Harold James

- Author: Harold James
- Language: English
- Subject: International monetary systems
- Genre: Economic history
- Publisher: Oxford University Press
- Publication date: 15 June 1996
- Publication place: England
- Pages: 779
- ISBN: 9781475506969

International Monetary Cooperation Since Bretton Woods is a non-fiction book detailing the economic history of international monetary systems after 1945. Written by Harold James, Professor of Economic History at Princeton University, the book details the history of the postwar monetary order amidst geopolitical tensions, economic challenges, and societal needs.

In the book, James argues, throughout the postwar years, the IMF was instrumental in providing relief and maintaining stability of the Bretton Woods system. It also played an important role in monetary matters of surveillance and information-sharing. The IMF promoted a system that was not rules-based, but rather cooperation-based. It was, however, challenged by nationalist governments and asymmetric capital flows on part of the United States.

The book was commissioned for the 50th anniversary of the International Monetary Fund. The other books in the series include:

- J. Keth Horsefield, The International Monetary Fund, 1945–1965: Twenty Years of International Monetary Cooperation (1969)
- Margaret Garritsen de Vries, The International Monetary Fund, 1966–1971: The System Under Stress (1976)
- Margaret Garritsen de Vries The International Monetary Fund, 1972–1978: Cooperation on Trial (1985)
- James M. Boughton, Silent Revolution: The International Monetary Fund, 1979–1989 (2011)
- James M. Boughton, World Without Walls: The Global Economy and the IMF, 1990–1999 (2012)

== Reception ==
Harvard University economist Richard N. Cooper described the book as unbiased and evenhanded in its analysis. Anna J. Schwartz, a renowned Chicago school economist, praises the book's insightful analysis, but critiques it for not providing an overall assessment of the IMF's broader role.

== See also ==
- Economic history
- International Monetary Fund
- Bretton Woods system
