= Eberhard Wächtler =

German economic historian

- Born: May 10, 1929; Dresden, Weimar Republic
- Died: September 22, 2010 (aged 81)
- Education: University of Leipzig

Eberhard Wächtler (10 May 1929 – 22 September 2010) was a German economic historian. He was particularly notable for research in coal and steel sciences in postwar Germany.

Wächtler was born in Dresden, Weimar Republic, in 1929. After graduating from high school in 1947, he studied history, literature, philosophy and political economy at the University of Leipzig. In 1953 he graduated with a degree in history. He first worked as a research assistant in Leipzig, after which he worked as a research associate at the Institute of History of the German Academy of Sciences at Berlin until 1962. He received his doctorate in 1957 on the subject of the history of the condition miners in the coal district of Saxony-Lugau Ölsnitz from 1889 to 1914. He completed his habilitation in 1968 at the University of Rostock, with work on historical traditions in the German mining industry from 1807 to 1871.

From 1962 to 1990, Wächtler was Chair of the History of Technology department at the Freiberg Mining Academy (German: Technische Universität Bergakademie Freiberg). He was considered an expert in mining history. He wrote, often jointly with Otfried Wagenbreth, a wide range of books on the history of technology, such as mining and metallurgy in the city of Freiberg.

After German Reunification in 1990, Wächtler became a member of the Board of the Hessian Coal Mining Museum and was instrumental in the development of Borken mining museum. He was a member of the Leibniz Society in Berlin.

== Works ==
- Eberhard Wächtler: Bibliographie 1952-2004. TU Bergakademie Freiberg, 2004
- Literature by and about Eberhard Wächtler in the German National Library catalogue
