= Louis Galambos =

American historian (born 1931)

- Born: Louis Paul Galambos; April 4, 1931 (age 95)
- Education: Indiana University (BA); Yale University (MA, PhD)
- Occupation: Historian

Louis Paul Galambos (born April 4, 1931) is an American historian known for his contributions to business history. He is a professor emeritus in the Department of History and editor of The Papers of Dwight David Eisenhower (21 volumes) at Johns Hopkins University, where he has worked since 1971. He previously served as an Assistant Professor (1960-1966), Associate Professor (1966-1969), and Professor (1969-1970) at Rice University. He also served as a Professor (1970-1971) at Rutgers University.

Along with Rondo Cameron, Galambos served as co-editor for the Journal of Economic History from 1975 to 1978.

== Education ==
Galambos earned a B.A. in history (1955) from Indiana University, an M.A. in history (1957) and Ph.D. (1960) from Yale University.

== Publications ==
=== Books ===
- Galambos, Louis (2012). The Creative Society - And The Price Americans Paid For It. Cambridge University Press. ISBN 9781107013179.
- Galambos, Louis (2018). Eisenhower: Becoming the Leader of the Free World. Johns Hopkins University Press. ISBN 9781421425047.

=== Articles ===
- "The McNamara Bank and Its Legacy, 1968-1987". Business History Review. 1995.
- "Global Perspectives on Modern Business". Business History Review. 1997.
- "Recasting the Organizational Synthesis: Structure and Process in the Twentieth and Twenty-First Centuries". Business History Review. 2005.
- "The Business of History". Wall Street Journal. 2006.
- "The Entrepreneurial Culture and the Mysteries of Economic Development". Essays in Economic & Business History. 2018.
