= Financial History Review =

Peer-reviewed academic journal

- Discipline: Economic history, business history, finance
- Language: English
- Edited by: Stefano Battilossi and Rui Esteves

Publication details
- History: 1994–present
- Publisher: Cambridge University Press on behalf of The European Association for Banking and Financial History
- Frequency: Triannually
- Impact factor: 0.4 (2023)

Standard abbreviations
- ISO 4: Financ. Hist. Rev.

Indexing
- ISSN: 0968-5650 (print); 1474-0052 (web)

Links
- Journal homepage; Webpage

Financial History Review is a peer-reviewed academic journal published three times a year by Cambridge University Press on behalf of European Association for Banking and Financial History (eabh). Established in 1994, the journal covers the historical development of banking, finance, and monetary matters. Articles address a broad range of issues of financial and monetary history, including technical and theoretical approaches, those derived from cultural and social perspectives, and the interrelations between politics and finance. The European University Institute library together with Cambridge University Press have created a bibliography database for the journal.

== History ==
The academic field of financial and banking history began in the 1930s with early research on British institutions, such as Sir John Clapham's study on the Bank of England and W. F. Crick and J. E. Wadsworth's research on joint-stock banking. Subsequent research on the early-modern period began in the 1950s/1960s, covering topics such as bills of exchange, the English financial revolution, and Italian merchant bankers. One challenge to its further development was the growing split between academics in history and in economic history. From the late 1950s, economic history increasingly became a sub-field of economics, rather than a sub-field of history. This change also coincided with the growing use of quantitative and cliometric analysis. Meanwhile, historians began to combine the study of economic and social phenomena through the methodologies founded by the Annales School in France. This new discipline paved the way for Economic and Social History programs, common at universities in the United Kingdom and Europe. As such, financial history, since the 1980s, remains a comparatively small sub-field compared to other sub-disciplines, like economic history and business history.

The European Association for Banking and Financial History (eabh), founded in 1990, created the Financial History Review in 1994. The journal's co-founders were Youssef Cassis (Professor of Economic History, European University Institute) and Philip Cottrell (Emeritus Professor of Financial History, University of Leicester). According to Cassis, the field of financial history has seen rapid development in the past two decades: "Financial history has managed to remain a fairly homogenous discipline."

In recent issues, the FHR has also strived to be international in scope. Financial institutions and multinational banking require significant research into the role of cross-border or transnational histories. Cassis and Cottrell defined financial history broadly, noting overlapping themes between social history, cultural history, and area studies: "The present purpose has not been to give voice to some particular sectarian view, but to try and indicate that this journal represents a broad church, within both financial history and history".

The journal publishes articles on the interrelations of finance, history, public policy, culture and society. The eabh describes the journal as its official publication. Each volume contains research articles, a reviews section ("The Past Mirror"), and an annual bibliography. According to its inaugural publication, the journal aims to promote closer collaboration between "academic practitioners and the practical world of banking and finance". The articles rely predominantly on descriptive, analytical, and a mix of qualitative and quantitative evidence. The findings have been referenced in media news outlets, such as Forbes.

== Abstracting and indexing ==
The journal has been indexed by EBSCO, Scopus, International Bibliography of the Social Sciences, and RePEc.

== See also ==
- The Journal of Economic History
- Economic History Review
- Business History Review
