= Francesco Boldizzoni =

Italian social scientist and historian

- Born: 17 July 1979 (age 47)
- Education: Bocconi University
- Scientific career
- Workplaces: University of Bari; University of Turin (2011–2016); University of Helsinki; Norwegian University of Science and Technology; University of Palermo
- Thesis: Malattie monetarie, cupidigia di principi e rivoluzione dei prezzi in Alta Italia (1550–1630) (2002)
- Academic advisors: Marco Cattini

Francesco Boldizzoni (born 17 July 1979) is an Italian economic historian and academic.

== Biography ==
Boldizzoni completed his master's degree in economic and social science at Bocconi University in Milan with a thesis on the price revolution in northern Italy, written under the guidance of Marco Cattini, in 2002. He was a doctoral student there from 2003 to 2006.

He taught at the University of Bari, the University of Turin (2011–2016), the University of Helsinki (2017–2019) and the Norwegian University of Science and Technology (2019–2025), where he held the Chair of Political Theory. He was then appointed as a professor of economic history at the University of Palermo. He was elected a life fellow at Clare Hall, Cambridge in 2007 and held a visiting professorship at the Max Planck Institute for the Study of Societies in Cologne.

Boldizzoni is one of the leading European figures in political economy. He has made influential contributions to the theory and history of capitalism and developed an intellectual framework that emphasizes the relevance of the history of ideas and concepts to the understanding of the modern economy. He has advocated an anti-positivist approach to the historical and social sciences, which draws on social constructionism, cultural interpretation, and critical theory.

== The Poverty of Clio ==
Boldizzoni gained international fame with his book The Poverty of Clio, published by Princeton University Press in 2011, where he dissected the accounts of past economic life produced by neoinstitutionalist scholars in the US since the end of the Cold War. He depicted these attempts to rewrite history in the light of the mood of the present as examples of neoliberal science fiction. The book sparked a heated debate and was attacked by economist Deirdre McCloskey. McCloskey blamed Boldizzoni's sense of intellectual superiority and contempt for American culture which, in her view, had led him to dismiss the tools of mainstream economics as irrelevant to the study of the past. Boldizzoni responded by inviting neoliberal economists to seek psychological help for harbouring "the not-so-conscious belief that the past can be treated as a giant Wal-Mart".

== Survival of capitalism ==
Boldizzoni's most recent book, Foretelling the End of Capitalism, addresses the issue of the persistence of capitalism despite the many predictions about its end over the past two centuries. The book was released by Harvard University Press in the spring of 2020. Its main argument is that those predictions generally failed because they were made under the influence of the "Enlightenment myth of progress" and because they underestimated the primacy of culture over economic forces. According to Boldizzoni, capitalism has been kept alive by a combination of hierarchy and individualism. While he admits that even this system will one day come to an end, he warns that what comes next will still have much in common with capitalism. Boldizzoni sees capitalism as a product of Western society, imposed on other parts of the world through violence, extortion and the exercise of cultural hegemony. For these reasons he thinks that, regardless of its endurance in core countries, its global spread could at least be reverted as Western influence over the Global South declines. On the nature of the Chinese system, he observed: "Today it is fashionable to say that the Chinese regime is capitalist in fact if not in name. I don't agree with that at all. I don't know whether to call it socialist and, to be honest, I don't care. It is possible that a system is not capitalist without being socialist: the complexity of the world cannot be reduced to simple oppositions".

== Political views ==
Boldizzoni has repeatedly expressed his social-democratic convictions. He favours a classic model of social democracy, based on progressive taxation, capital controls and a large public sector. He can be regarded as a theorist of democratic sovereignty. His defence of national sovereignty is based on the assumption that "the state – where it survives intact – is today the only framework within which social democracy can exist", and consequently supranational institutions cannot provide solutions to social justice problems. Boldizzoni is also a vehement critic of Third-Way centrism, arguing that the political parties that insist on following this path are anachronistic and doomed to be overwhelmed by the populist right.

== Publications ==
- (2008) Means and Ends: The Idea of Capital in the West, 1500–1970, New York: Macmillan.
- (2011) The Poverty of Clio: Resurrecting Economic History, Princeton: Princeton University Press.
- (2016) Routledge Handbook of Global Economic History, edited with Pat Hudson. London: Routledge.
- (2020) Foretelling the End of Capitalism: Intellectual Misadventures since Karl Marx, Cambridge, MA: Harvard University Press.
