= Richard C. Overton =

Richard Cleghorn Overton (November 9, 1907 – September 30, 1988) was an American railroad historian, a founding member and first secretary of the Lexington Group in Transportation History, and a founding member and the first president of the Business History Conference.

== Early life and education ==
Overton earned his BA in history in 1929, and his MA in economics in 1934 at Williams College. He completed his MA and PhD in history at Harvard University in 1944.

== Career ==
Overton taught French at the Hotchkiss School, economics at Williams College, and history at North Adams State College, Amherst College, Harvard University, Northwestern University, the University of Western Ontario, and at Burr and Burton Academy. He worked as a research consultant and assistant to the President of the Chicago, Burlington and Quincy Railroad, and was also a research consultant for the Association of American Railroads as well as several regional railroad companies. He served as a Director of the Central Vermont Railway.

== Railway history ==
Overton wrote several books on railroad history, and more than 100 articles and book reviews on the subject. Joe W. Kizzia in "Richard C. Overton Railroad Historian. - book reviews", summed up Overton's view on railroad history: "...railroads had so much to do with making the United States into 'us'." Overton wrote in an article that appeared in Railway Age in February 1948:

"It is superfluous to recall that railways have been an essential prerequisite to the development of American industry, commerce, and agriculture. They opened the great West, built cities, enabled us to fight our wars effectively, and have been one of the greatest forces toward nationalism in our history."

Overton received the Railroad History Senior Achievement award For a Lifetime of Significant Contribution to the Writing, Preservation, and Interpretation of North America's Railroading History from the Railway & Locomotive Historical Society on May 8, 1982.

== Selected works ==
- Perkins/Budd: Railway Statesmen of the Burlington (Contributions in Economics and Economic History) (Greenwood, 1982)
- Burlington Route: A History of the Burlington Lines (Knopf, 1965)
- Gulf to Rockies: The Heritage of the Fort Worth and Denver-Colorado and Southern Railways, 1861-1898 (University of Texas Press, 1953)
- Burlington West: A colonization history of the Burlington Railroad (Harvard University Press, 1941)
- Over My Shoulder: A Memoir, privately printed

== Archives ==
- Richard C. Overton Papers, Northwestern University Archives
- Lexington Group Records, Northwestern University Archives
- Richard C. Overton Railroad Historian, Edited by H. Roger Grant The Lexington Group, Inc
