= Walter A. Friedman =

American academic (born 1962)

- Born: June 7, 1962 (age 64); Lexington, Massachusetts, U.S.
- Occupation: Academic

Walter A. Friedman (born June 7, 1962) is an American academic. He graduated from Lexington High School in 1980 and received his PhD in American History from Columbia University in 1996. He serves as a Lecturer of Business Administration and the Director of the Business History Initiative at the Harvard Business School. He is the co-editor of the Business History Review with Geoffrey Jones.

== Works ==
- Friedman, Walter A. (2004). Birth of a Salesman: The Transformation of Selling in America. Cambridge, Massachusetts: Harvard University Press. ISBN 9780674018334. OCLC 53099103.
- Friedman, Walter A. (2014). Fortune Tellers: The Story of America's First Economic Forecasters. Princeton, New Jersey: Princeton University Press. ISBN 9780691159119. OCLC 858778194.
- Friedman, Walter A. (2020). American Business History: A Very Short Introduction. New York, New York: Oxford University Press. ISBN 9780190622473. OCLC 1119757162.
