= Geoffrey Jones (academic) =

British-born business historian

- Born: Birmingham, United Kingdom
- Education: Corpus Christi College, Cambridge
- Occupation: Academic
- Known for: Professor of Business History at Harvard Business School
- Children: Dylan Jones

Geoffrey G. Jones is a British-born business historian. He became a US citizen in 2010. He is currently Isidor Straus Professor of Business History at the Harvard Business School. The previous holders of this Chair, which was the first in the world in business history being founded in 1927, included Alfred D. Chandler, Jr. and Thomas K. McCraw.

Jones's works have concentrated on the historical evolution of globalization, international banking and trading, and foreign direct investment by multinationals. He has published histories of Unilever, and has more recently written on the history of sustainable business worldwide. In 2017 he published a historical study of green entrepreneurship from the nineteenth century until the present day called Profits and Sustainability. A History of Green Entrepreneurship (Oxford, 2017) His most recent book is called Deeply Responsible Business. A Global History of Values-Driven Leadership (Harvard University Press, 2023)

== Life ==
Born in Birmingham, Jones attended Corpus Christi College, Cambridge. After receiving his PhD, he worked there as a research fellow. He then became a lecturer in economic history at the London School of Economics before becoming a professor in business history at the University of Reading. In 1997 he founded the Centre for International Business History at the University of Reading.[ Jones served twice as president of the Association of Business Historians (1992–93 and 2000-1), president of the European Business History Association (1997–1999) and president of the Business History Conference (2001–2002). Between 1988 and 2003 Jones was the co-editor of the journal Business History. In 2002 he moved to Harvard Business School. In 2012 he was appointed Faculty Chair of the Business History Initiative at Harvard Business School. Subsequently, the Business History Initiative developed a project called Creating Emerging Markets, designed to facilitate research and teaching on the business history of emerging markets, which includes interviews with long-time leaders of firms and NGOs in Latin America, South Asia, Turkey and Africa.

Jones holds an honorary Doctorate in Economics and Business Administration from Copenhagen Business School, Denmark, and an honorary Phd from the University of Helsinki, Finland. He is a Fellow of the Academy of International Business and a Fellow of the Royal Historical Society.In July 2020, Jones was elected a Corresponding Fellow of the British Academy, Britain’s national academy for the humanities and social sciences. Jones currently serves as the co-editor of the quarterly journal Business History Review.

== Work ==
Jones initially researched relationships between business and governments. He published historical monographs on the oil industry and international banking. From the 1980s, Jones, alongside Mark Casson, was also involved in calling for a more theoretical approach to business history, particularly in the use of economic theory. During this period he wrote historical studies of industries over long time periods, including British Multinational Banking 1830-1990 (Oxford, 1993) and Merchants to Multinationals (Oxford, 2000). Merchants to Multinationals was awarded the Newcomen-Harvard Prize for the best business history book published in the United States between 1998 and 2000, and the Wadsworth Prize for the best work of business history published in Britain in 2000. After moving to Harvard Business School, Jones published books on the history of global business, including Multinationals and Global Capitalism (Oxford, 2005). In 2010, Jones published Beauty Imagined: A History of the Global Beauty Industry (Oxford, 2010). In this book, and elsewhere, Jones has sought both to explain the growth of the beauty industry and to explore its impact over the last century on homogenizing beauty ideals worldwide.He has written Harvard Business School cases on leading entrepreneurs in the industry, including the iconic Helena Rubinstein, the founder of the American luxury cosmetics sector. Recently Jones has focused on the history of green business and sustainability, and has written on the societal responsibilities of capitalism. In addition to the Creating Emerging Markets project, he has also researched the business history of emerging markets, including Latin America and Turkey. Jones and co-authors have called for the business history of emerging markets to be mainstreamed in the discipline as a whole, and seen as an alternative business history rather than merely adding new settings to explore established core debates Jones has encouraged international business scholars to test theories against historical evidence. In 2006 he and Tarun Khanna published a widely cited article in the Journal of International Business Studies, the premier international business journal, on this issue. More recently Jones and Khanna have published on the importance of corporate reputation in emerging markets, employing data from the Creating Emerging Markets project.

Jones has warned of the risks to the world economy of economic nationalism and populism. In 2017, Jones suggested the world economy was undergoing a process of de-globalization.
