= History of industrialisation =

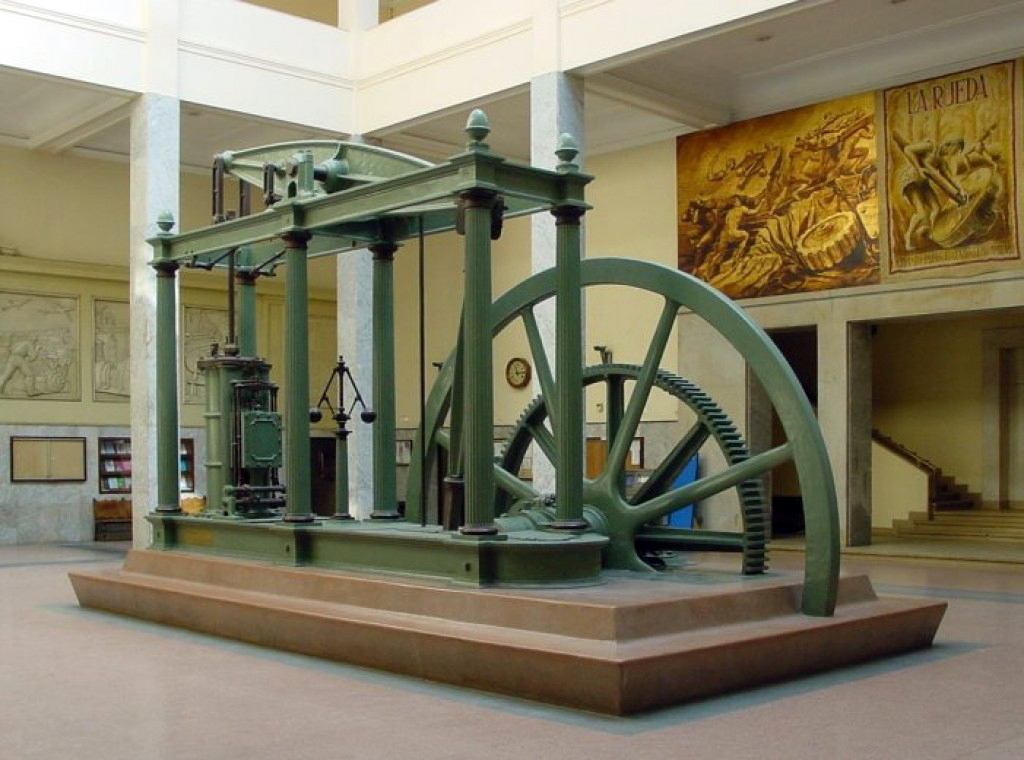
A Watt steam engine, the steam engine fuelled primarily by coal that propelled the Industrial Revolution in the United Kingdom and the world

This article delineates the history of industrialisation.

== Background ==
Most pre-industrial economies had standards of living not much above subsistence, among that the majority of the population were focused on producing their means of survival. For example, in medieval Europe, as much as 80% of the labour force was employed in subsistence agriculture.

Some pre-industrial economies, such as classical Athens, had trade and commerce as significant factors, so native Greeks could enjoy wealth far beyond a sustenance standard of living through the use of slavery. Famines were frequent in most pre-industrial societies, although some, such as the Netherlands and England of the 17th and 18th centuries, the Italian city-states of the 15th century, the medieval Islamic Caliphate, and the ancient Greek and Roman civilisations were able to escape the famine cycle through increasing trade and commercialisation of the agricultural sector. It is estimated that during the 17th century, Netherlands imported nearly 70% of its grain supply; and in the 5th century BC Athens imported three-quarters of its total food supply.

In his 1728 work on the economy of England, A Plan of the English Commerce, Daniel Defoe describes how England developed from being a raw wool producer to the manufacture of finished woolen textiles. Defoe writes that Tudor monarchs, especially Henry VII of England and Elizabeth I, implemented policies that today would be described as protectionist, such as imposing high tariffs on the importation of finished woolen goods, imposing high taxes on raw wool exports leaving England, bringing in artisans skilled in wool textile manufacturing from the Low Countries, awarding selective government-granted monopoly rights in geographic areas of England deemed suitable for textile industrial production, and granting government-sponsored industrial espionage to develop the early English textile industry.

Industrialisation through innovation in manufacturing processes first started with the Industrial Revolution in the north-west and Midlands of England in the 18th century. It spread to Europe and North America in the 19th century.

== Industrial Revolution in Europe ==
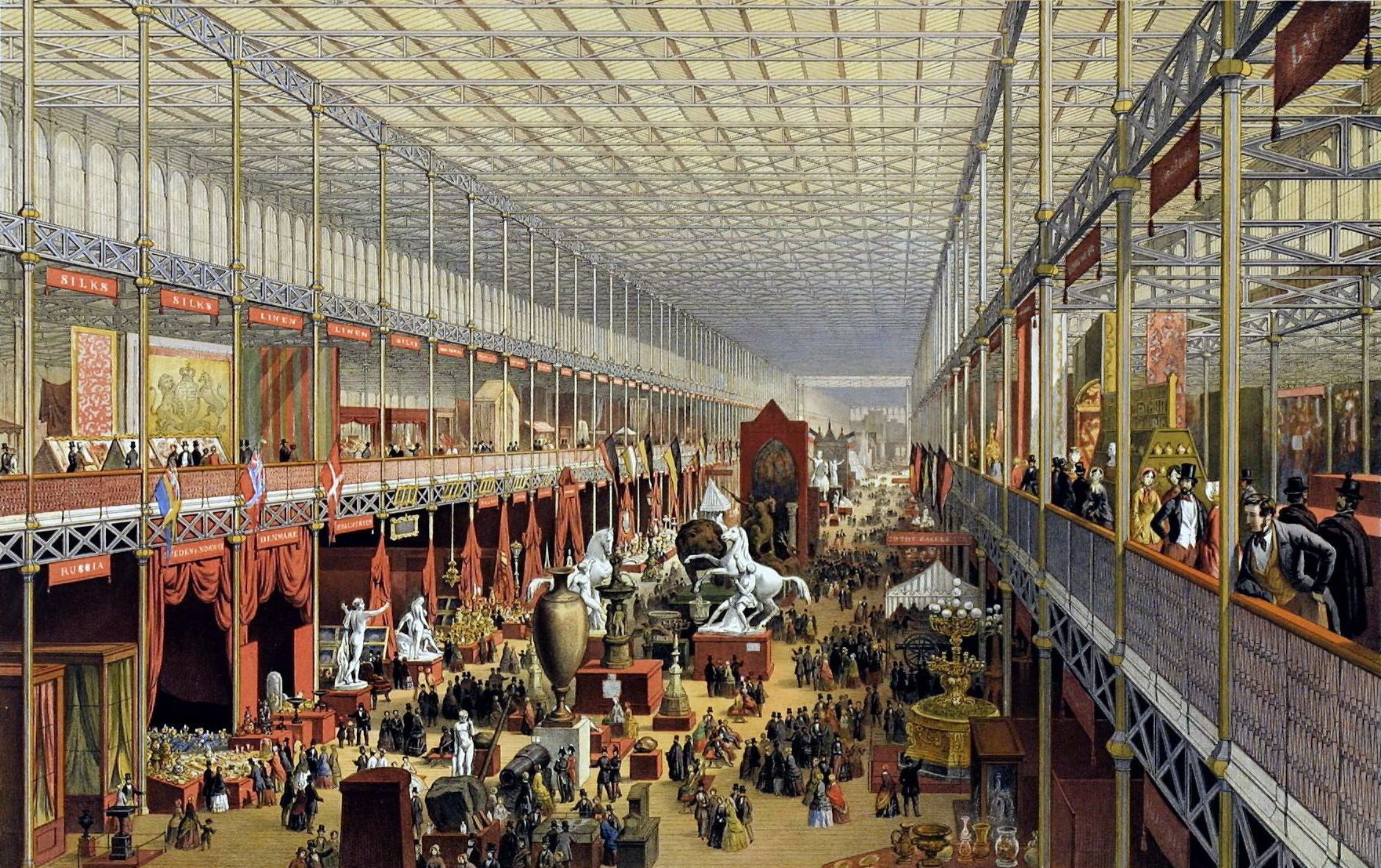
The Crystal Palace Great Exhibition of the Works of Industry of all Nations, London, 1851

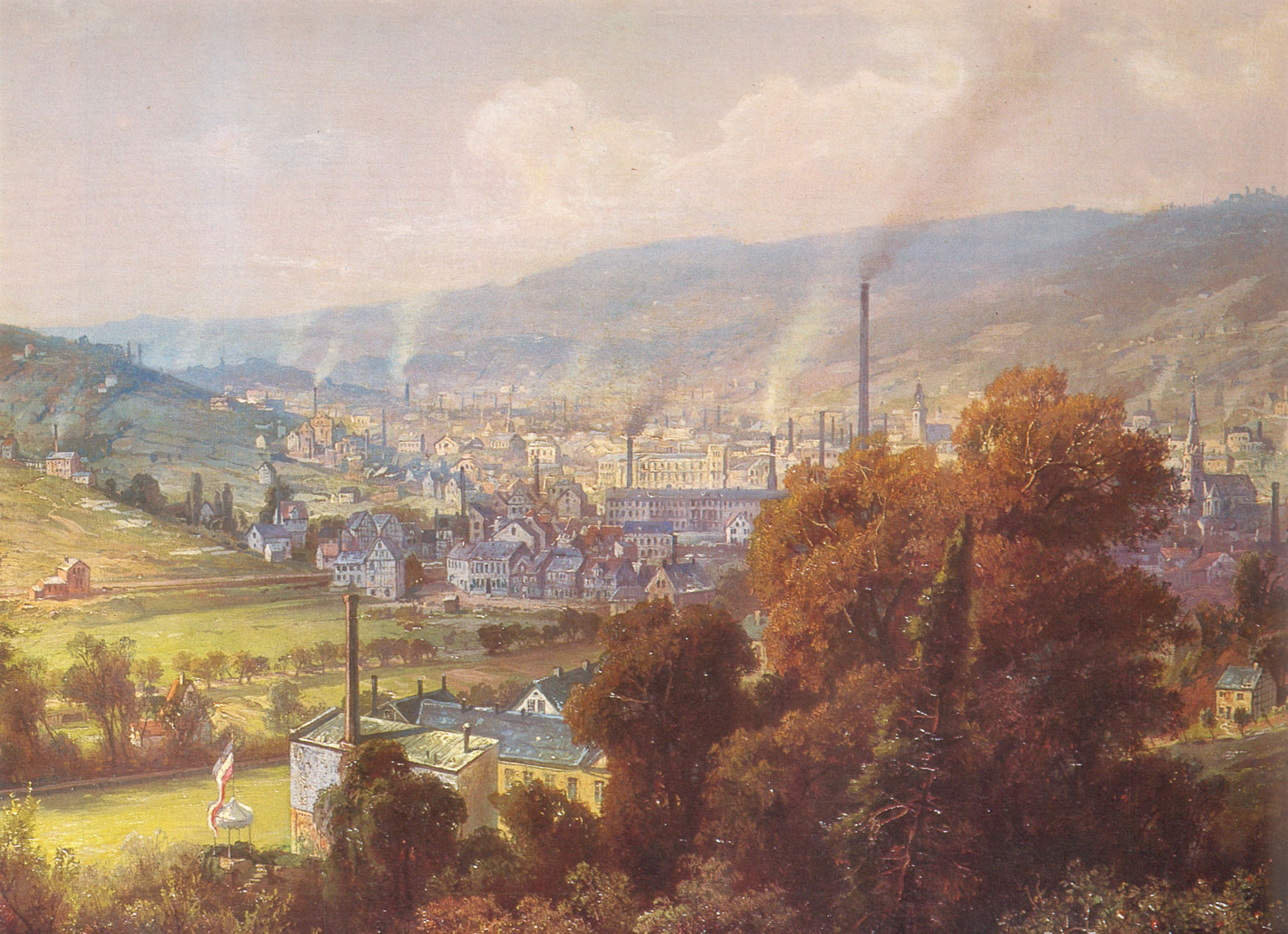
Early industrialisation in Germany, the city of Barmen in 1870. Painting by August von Wille.

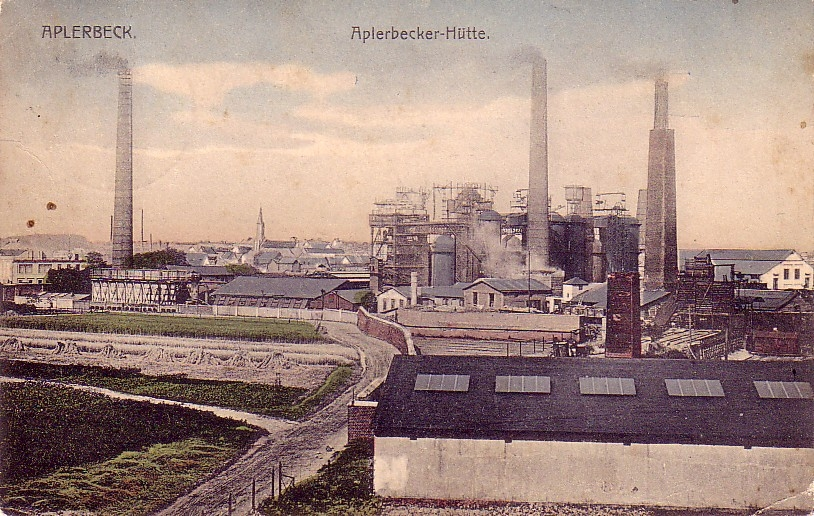
Aplerbecker Hütte, an industrialised area of Dortmund, Germany, c. 1910

The United Kingdom was the first country in the world to industrialise. In the 18th and 19th centuries, the UK experienced a massive increase in agricultural productivity known as the British Agricultural Revolution, which enabled an unprecedented population growth, freeing a significant percentage of the workforce from farming, and helping to drive the Industrial Revolution.

Due to the limited amount of arable land and the overwhelming efficiency of mechanised farming, the increased population could not be dedicated to agriculture. New agricultural techniques allowed a single peasant to feed more workers than previously; however, these techniques also increased the demand for machines and other hardware, which had traditionally been provided by the urban artisans. Artisans, collectively called bourgeoisie, employed rural exodus workers to increase their output and meet the country's needs.

British industrialisation involved significant changes in the way that work was performed. The process of creating a good was divided into simple tasks, each one of them being gradually mechanised in order to boost productivity and thus increase income. The new machines helped to improve the productivity of each worker. However, industrialisation also involved the exploitation of new forms of energy. In the pre-industrial economy, most machinery was powered by human muscle, by animals, by wood-burning or by water-power. With industrialisation these sources of fuel were replaced with coal, which could deliver significantly more energy than the alternatives. Much of the new technology that accompanied the industrial revolution was for machines which could be powered by coal. One outcome of this was an increase in the overall amount of energy consumed within the economy, a trend which has continued in all industrialised nations to the present-day.

The accumulation of capital allowed investments in the scientific conception and application of new technologies, enabling the industrialisation process to continue to evolve. The industrialisation process formed a class of industrial workers who had more money to spend than their agricultural cousins. They spent this on items such as tobacco and sugar, creating new mass markets that stimulated more investment as merchants sought to exploit them.

The mechanisation of production spread to the countries surrounding England geographically in Europe such as France and to British settler colonies, helping to make those areas the wealthiest, and shaping what is now known as the Western world.

Some economic historians argue that the possession of so-called 'exploitation colonies' eased the accumulation of capital to the countries that possessed them, speeding up their development. The consequence was that the subject country integrated a bigger economic system in a subaltern position, emulating the countryside, which demands manufactured goods and offers raw materials, while the colonial power stressed its urban posture, providing goods and importing food. A classical example of this mechanism is said to be the triangular trade, which involved England, southern United States and western Africa. Some have stressed the importance of natural or financial resources that Britain received from its many overseas colonies or that profits from the British slave trade between Africa and the Caribbean helped fuel industrial investment.

While these arguments still find some favour with historians of the colonies, most historians of the British Industrial Revolution do not consider that colonial possessions formed a significant role in the country's industrialisation. Whilst not denying that Britain could profit from these arrangements, they believe that industrialisation would have proceeded with or without the colonies.

== Early industrialisation in other countries ==
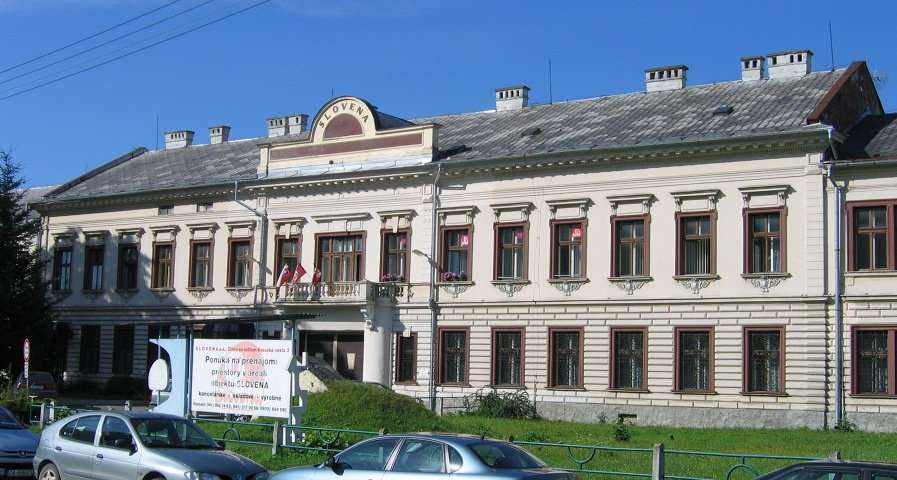
The textile factory Slovena built in 1891 in Žilina (Slovakia) - an example of a delayed industrialisation in Central Europe

The Industrial Revolution spread southwards and eastwards from its origins in Northwest Europe.

After the Convention of Kanagawa issued by Commodore Matthew C. Perry forced Japan to open the ports of Shimoda and Hakodate to American trade, the Japanese government realised that drastic reforms were necessary to stave off Western influence. The Tokugawa shogunate abolished the feudal system. The government instituted military reforms to modernise the Japanese army and also constructed the base for industrialisation. In the 1870s, the Meiji government vigorously promoted technological and industrial development that eventually changed Japan to a powerful modern country.

In a similar way, Russia which suffered during the Allied intervention in the Russian Civil War. The Soviet Union's centrally controlled economy decided to invest a big part of its resources to enhance its industrial production and infrastructures to assure its survival, thus becoming a world superpower. During the Cold War, the other Warsaw Pact countries, organised under the Comecon framework, followed the same developing scheme, albeit with a less emphasis on heavy industry.

Southern European countries such as Spain or Italy industrialised moderately during the late 19th and early 20th centuries, and then experienced economic booms after the Second World War, caused by a healthy integration of the European economy.

== The Third World ==
A similar state-led developing programme was pursued in virtually all the Third World countries during the Cold War, including the socialist ones, but especially in Sub-Saharan Africa after the decolonisation period. The primary scope of those projects was to achieve self-sufficiency through the local production of previously imported goods, the mechanisation of agriculture and the spread of education and health care. However, all those experiences failed bitterly due to a lack of realism: most countries did not have a pre-industrial bourgeoisie able to carry on a capitalistic development or even a stable and peaceful state. Those aborted experiences left huge debts toward western countries and fuelled public corruption.

=== Petrol-producing countries ===
Oil-rich countries saw similar failures in their economic choices. An EIA report stated that OPEC member nations were projected to earn a net amount of $1.251 trillion in 2008 from their oil exports. Because oil is both important and expensive, regions that had big reserves of oil had huge liquidity incomes. However, this was rarely followed by economic development. Experience shows that local elites were unable to re-invest the petrodollars obtained through oil export, and currency is wasted in luxury goods.

This is particularly evident in the Persian Gulf states, where the per capita income is comparable to those of western nations, but where no industrialisation has started. Apart from two little countries (Bahrain and the United Arab Emirates), the Persian Gulf states have not diversified their economies, and no replacement for the upcoming end of oil reserves is envisaged.

== Industrialisation in Asia ==
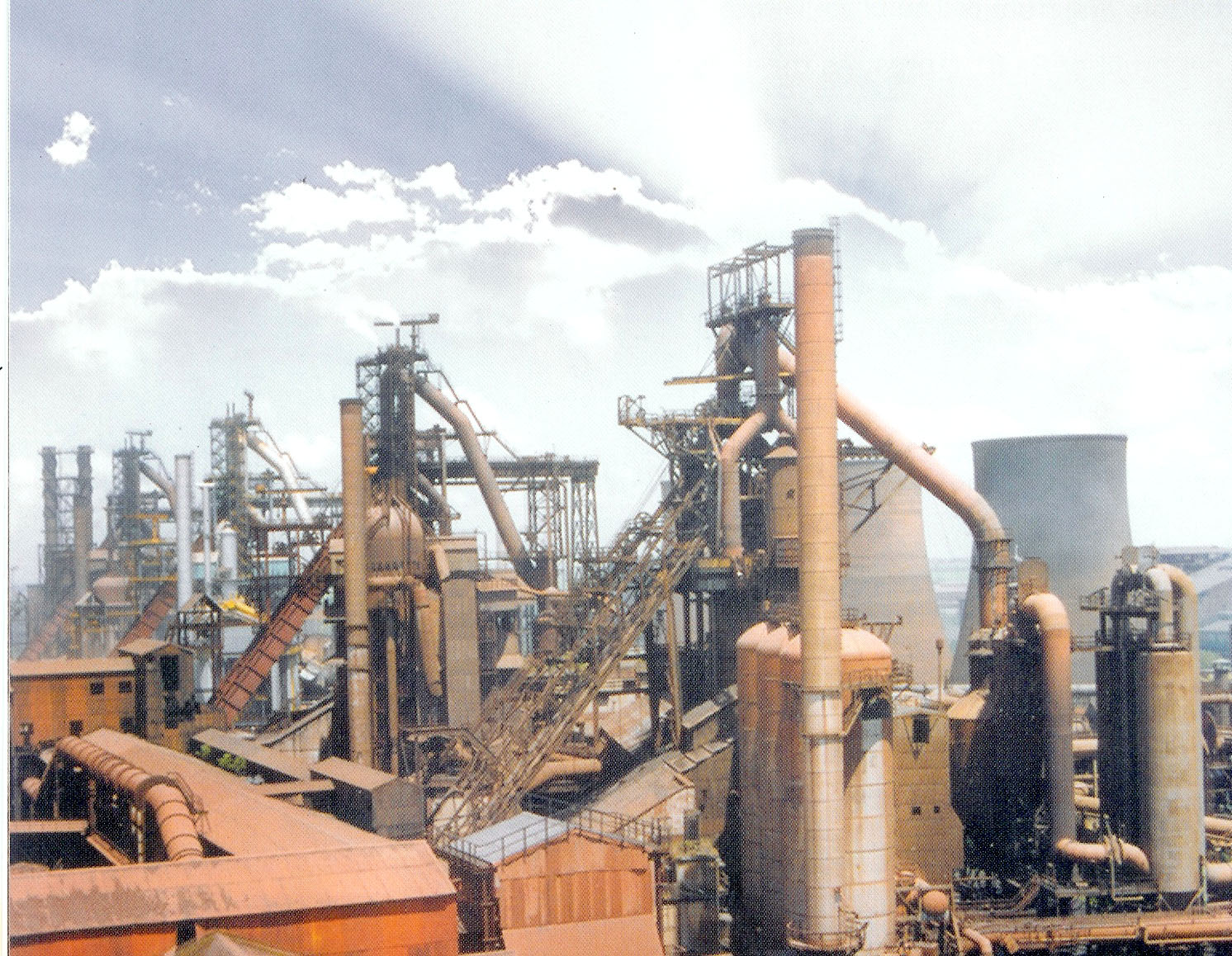
Durgapur Steel Plant located in West Bengal, India

Apart from Japan, where industrialisation began in the late 19th century, a different pattern of industrialisation followed in East Asia. One of the fastest rates of industrialisation occurred in the late 20th century across four places known as the Asian tigers (Hong Kong, Singapore, South Korea and Taiwan), thanks to the existence of stable governments and well structured societies, strategic locations, heavy foreign investments, a low cost skilled and motivated workforce, a competitive exchange rate, and low custom duties.

In the case of South Korea, the largest of the four Asian tigers, a very fast-paced industrialisation took place as it quickly moved away from the manufacturing of value-added goods in the 1950s and 60s into the more advanced steel, shipbuilding and automotive industry in the 1970s and 80s, focusing on the high-tech and service industry in the 1990s and 2000s. As a result, South Korea became a major economic power.

This starting model was afterwards successfully copied in other larger Eastern and Southern Asian countries. The success of this phenomenon led to a huge wave of offshoring – i.e., Western factories or Tertiary Sector corporations choosing to move their activities to countries where the workforce was less expensive and less collectively organised.

China and India, while roughly following this development pattern, made adaptations in line with their own histories and cultures, their major size and importance in the world, and the geo-political ambitions of their governments, etc..

Meanwhile, India's government is investing in economic sectors such as bioengineering, nuclear technology, pharmaceutics, informatics, and technologically oriented higher education, exceeding its needs, with the goal of creating several specialisation poles able to conquer foreign markets.

Both China and India have also started to make significant investments in other developing countries, making them significant players in today's world economy.

Despite this trend being artificially influenced by the oil price increases since 2003, the phenomenon is not entirely new nor totally speculative (for instance see: Maquiladora).
