= A Plan of the English Commerce =

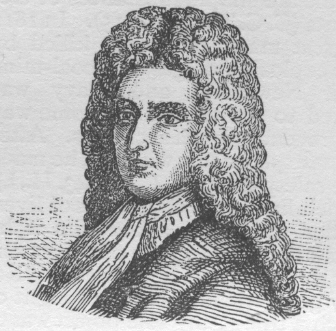
Daniel Defoe

A Plan of the English Commerce: Being a Compleat Prospect of the Trade of This Nation, As Well the Home Trade As the Foreign is perhaps chief among Daniel Defoe's tracts dealing with economic issues. In it he argues that the employment of labour on the working up of domestic produce, particularly wool, would be the true path to prosperity.

== Contents ==
Defoe describes how Henry VII selected areas that were suited for woolen textile manufacture: Henry VII "set the Manufacture of Wool on Foot in several Parts of his Country...pitch'd upon for its particular Situation, adapted to the Work, being filled with innumerable Springs of Water, Pits of Coal, and other Things proper for carrying out such a Business..."

In the tract Defoe describes how the Tudors, Henry VII and Elizabeth I, developed England’s woolen manufacturing industry, by use of policies that would now be described as:

- government subsidies to private enterprise;
- high tariffs on competing finished woolen products imported from abroad;
- high taxes on raw wool that is exported out of England, and for a time the banning of such exports, so as to provide inexpensive raw material for the fledgling English wool industry;
- distribution of government-granted monopoly rights;
- the government bringing in to England from the Low Countries artisans skilled in wool textile production;
- workers rights; and
- government-sponsored industrial espionage.

== Editions ==
Defoe, Daniel (1728). A Plan of the English Commerce: Being a Compleat Prospect of the Trade of This Nation, As Well the Home Trade As the Foreign, Rowman & Littlefield Pub Inc; 2 Reprint edition (June 1967) ISBN 0-678-00316-5, ISBN 978-0-678-00316-9
