= Essays in Economic & Business History =

Academic journal

- Discipline: History, economics
- Language: English
- Edited by: Mark Billings, Daniel Giedeman

Publication details
- History: 1975-present
- Publisher: The Economic & Business History Society
- Frequency: Annually
- Open access: Yes
- License: Creative Commons

Standard abbreviations
- ISO 4: Essays Econ. Bus. Hist.

Indexing
- ISSN: 0896-226X
- LCCN: 87658048
- OCLC no.: 844690672

Links
- Journal homepage; Current issue online; Online archive

Essays in Economic & Business History is an annual peer-reviewed academic journal covering economic and business history. It is published by the Economic & Business History Society. The editors-in-chief are Mark Billings (University of Exeter) and Daniel Giedeman (Grand Valley State University).

== History ==
The journal was founded in 1975 and the first issue was published in 1976. The following persons have been editors-in-chief:

- James H. Soltow, 1976–1983 (volumes 1 and 2)
- Edwin J. Perkins, 1984–1993 (volumes 3–12)
- William R. Childs, 1994–1998 (volumes 13–17)
- Michael V. Namorato, 1999-2003 (volumes 18–22)
- David O. Whitten, 2004–2006 (volumes 22–24)
- Lynne Pierson Doti, 2007–2009 (volumes 25–27)
- Janice M. Traflet, 2010-2012 (volumes 28-30)
- Jason E. Taylor, 2013-2018 (volumes 31-36)

== Abstracting and indexing ==
The journal is abstracted and indexed in America: History and Life, EconLit, Historical Abstracts, and the Modern Language Association Database.
