= Maxine Berg =

British historian and academic

Maxine Louise Berg, FRHistS, FBA (born 22 February 1950) is a British historian and academic. Since 1998, she has been a Professor of History at the University of Warwick. She has taught at Warwick since 1978, joining the Department of Economics, before transferring to History.

She is a Fellow of the British Academy (FBA), a Fellow of the Royal Historical Society (FRHistS), and an Honorary Fellow of Balliol College at the University of Oxford.

== Background ==
Berg obtained a doctorate from the University of Oxford. Her thesis was entitled The machinery question: Conceptions of technical change in political economy during the industrial revolution, c. 1820 to 1840.

== Selected publications ==
Books

- Slavery, Capitalism and the Industrial Revolution. (Coauthor with Pat Hudson). London: Polity. 2023.
- Luxury and Pleasure in Eighteenth-Century Britain. Oxford: Oxford University Press. 2005.
- Technological Revolutions in Europe: Historical Perspectives. Cheltenham: Edward Elgar. 1998.
- A Woman in History: Eileen Power, 1889–1940. Cambridge: Cambridge University Press. 1996.
- The Age of Manufactures, 1700–1820: Industry, Innovation and Work in Britain (2nd ed.). Abingdon: Routledge. 1994.
- The Machinery Question and the Making of Political Economy, 1815–1848. Cambridge: Cambridge University Press.

Papers

- Berg, Maxine (2014). "Skill, craft and histories of industrialization of Europe and Asia" (pdf). Transactions of the Royal Historical Society. 24. Royal Historical Society, Cambridge University Press: 127–48. doi:10.1017/S0080440114000061. S2CID 154017526. Archived (PDF) from the original on 23 September 2017.
