= Thomas J. Weiss =

Thomas J. Weiss (born July 21, 1942) is an emeritus professor of Economics at the University of Kansas and a research associate at the National Bureau of Economic Research. His research has investigated colonial economic growth and development and the growth of service sector. His work has been recognised by The Cliometric Society via their awarding him a Clio Can in recognition his of exceptional support of cliometrics. Between 1988 and 1992 he served as one of the two co-editors of the Journal of Economic History.

== Selected publications ==
- Weiss, Thomas J.(1975) The Service Sector in the United States, 1839 through 1899. New York, Arno Press
- Weiss, Thomas J.and Fred Bateman (eds)(1981) A Deplorable Scarcity: The Failure of Industrialization in the Antebellum South, Chapel Hill: University of North Carolina Press
- Weiss, Thomas J. and D. Schaefer (eds)(1994) Economic Development in Historical Perspective, Stanford University Press
