= Business History Review =

- Discipline: Business history
- Language: English
- Edited by: Walter A. Friedman; Geoffrey Jones

Publication details
- Former name: Bulletin of the Business Historical Society
- History: 1926–present
- Publisher: Cambridge University Press for Harvard Business School (United States)
- Frequency: Quarterly
- Impact factor: 1.2 (2022)

Standard abbreviations
- ISO 4: Bus. Hist. Rev.

Indexing
- ISSN: 0007-6805
- OCLC no.: 863044746

Links
- Journal homepage

The Business History Review is a scholarly quarterly published by Cambridge University Press for Harvard Business School. Business History Review is a peer-reviewed academic journal covering the field of business history. It was established in 1954 by Harvard University Press as the continuation of the Bulletin of the Business Historical Society.

The journal is one of the leading scholarly journals in the field of business history alongside Enterprise & Society and Business History.

The Business History Review traces its origins to 1926 with the publication of Harvard's Bulletin of the Business Historical Society. The Bulletin aimed "to encourage and aid the study of the evolution of business in all periods and in all countries" and devoted much space to describing the growing archival collections of Harvard's Baker Library. Henrietta Larson, whose Guide to Business History (1948) also documented the scope of available research materials, was editor from 1938 to 1953.

In 1954, the Bulletin changed its name to Business History Review and took its current format of publishing peer-reviewed research articles and book reviews. In these years, the intellectual framework of the field of business history was defined by the work of Alfred D. Chandler Jr., who published 11 research articles in the journal. One of the most popular (with 212 Google Scholar cites) was his 1959 piece "The Beginnings of 'Big Business' in American Industry", which explored the question of why large, vertically integrated corporations were formed in the late nineteenth-century and why they took the structure they did. Another highly cited article (240 Google Scholar cites) from 1970 was "{The Emerging Organizational Synthesis in American History" by Louis Galambos, which also focused on explaining the growth of bureaucratic structures in the United States.

In 1974, Business History Review published its first special issue on the multinational corporation. Included in the issue was an article on oil companies operating in South America by Mira Wilkins, who pioneered the field of international business history. The journal also expanded its focus beyond the workings of business enterprise to cover business-government relations. In 1975, Thomas K. McCraw, who edited the journal from 1994 to 2005, published "Regulation in America: A Review Article". In 2011, the current editors, Walter A. Friedman and Geoffrey Jones (academic), listed the BHR's core subjects as innovation, globalization, entrepreneurship, business and the environment, business and government, and business and democracy. In 2022, the journal had an impact factor of 1.2 and was rated as a 4 by the British Academic Journal Guide (a 4* is the highest rating).
