= Enterprise & Society =

- Discipline: Business history
- Language: English

Publication details
- History: 1999-present
- Publisher: Cambridge University Press
- Frequency: Quarterly
- Impact factor: 0.593 (2016)

Standard abbreviations
- ISO 4: Enterp. Soc.

Indexing
- ISSN: 1467-2227 (print); 1467-2235 (web)
- JSTOR: entesoci
- OCLC no.: 43855051

Links
- Journal homepage

Enterprise & Society is a peer-reviewed academic journal on business history published by Cambridge University Press for the Business History Conference, which holds its copyright.

== Abstracting and indexing ==
According to the Journal Citation Reports, the journal has a 2016 impact factor of 0.593, ranking it 110th out of 121 journals in the category "Business" and 14th out of 35 in the category "History of Social Sciences". In addition, the journal is abstracted and indexed in Current Contents/Social and Behavioral Sciences, International Bibliography of the Social Sciences, ProQuest, Scopus, and Social Sciences Citation Index.
