= Economic History Association =

Academic society for economic historians

- Abbreviation: EHA
- Formation: 1940
- Headquarters: Department of Economics, University of Wisconsin-La Crosse
- Members: 1,000
- Executive Director: Michael Haupert
- President: Paul Rhode
- President-Elect: Jean-Laurent Rosenthal
- Website: eh.net/eha/

The Economic History Association (EHA) was founded in 1940 to "encourage and promote teaching, research, and publication on every phase of economic history and to help preserve and administer materials for research in economic history". It publishes The Journal of Economic History with the Cambridge University Press, holds an annual meeting that usually takes place in September, and awards prizes and grants. It is also the home to the EH.Net Encyclopedia of Economic and Business History.

== History ==
Prior to the creation of the EHA, many American economic historians were members of the Economic History Society, which was established in the UK in 1926. In 1939, there was a push among some members of the American Historical Association and the American Economic Association to set up an American economic history association. The meeting to found the Economic History Association, which was organized by Earl J. Hamilton, was held on December 29, 1939.

In the early 1960s, there were approximately 2,000 members.

== Membership ==
There are more than 1,000 EHA members worldwide, and composed of faculty and graduate students from universities around the world, as well as economists in the private sector and in government.

Michael Haupert of the University of Wisconsin-La Crosse is the executive director, and Paul Rhode of the University of Michigan is the President. Previous EHA Presidents include Oxford's Robert C. Allen, Vanderbilt's Jeremy Atack, UC Berkeley's Barry Eichengreen, Yale's Naomi Lamoreaux, as well as Economics Nobel Laureates Robert Fogel and Douglass North.

== Prizes and grants ==
The Economic History Association supports research through Arthur H. Cole grants-in-aid and awards prizes for publications, dissertations, and teaching, as well as fellowships and grants for students of economic history.

It awards several prizes for publications:

- Arthur Cole Prize: best article published in The Journal of Economic History each year
- Alice Hanson Jones prize: for the best book published biennially in American economic history
- Gyorgi Ranki prize: best book published biennially in non-American economic history
- Allan Nevins prize: best dissertation on American or Canadian economic history, awarded on behalf of Columbia University Press
- Alexander Gerschenkron prize: best dissertation in non-American economic history
- Jonathan Hughes Prize: for superior teaching
- Engerman-Goldin Prize: biennial prize for contributions to economic history made in the previous five years. It is the EHA's newest award and whose first award will be disbursed in 2018.

The society also provides grants to support the early stages of dissertation work in economic history and fellowships to support students finishing their dissertations on the topic. Two Kenneth Sokoloff fellowships are awarded by the EHA each year to students finishing their dissertations in economic history.

== Annual conferences ==
EHA's annual conference is held each September in North America. The 2025 meeting took place in Philadelphia, with the theme "Information and Communications in Economic History".

In partnership with American Economic Association, EHA has designated sessions at the annual ASSA conference each January.
