= Ohrdruf (disambiguation) =

Ohrdruf is a town in the German state of Thuringia.

Ohrdruf may also refer to:

- Ohrdruf concentration camp
- Ohrdruf Priory

== See also ==
- Michaeliskirche (Ohrdruf)
