= Jonas Valley =

Valley in Germany

Coordinates: 50°49′25″N 10°55′31″E

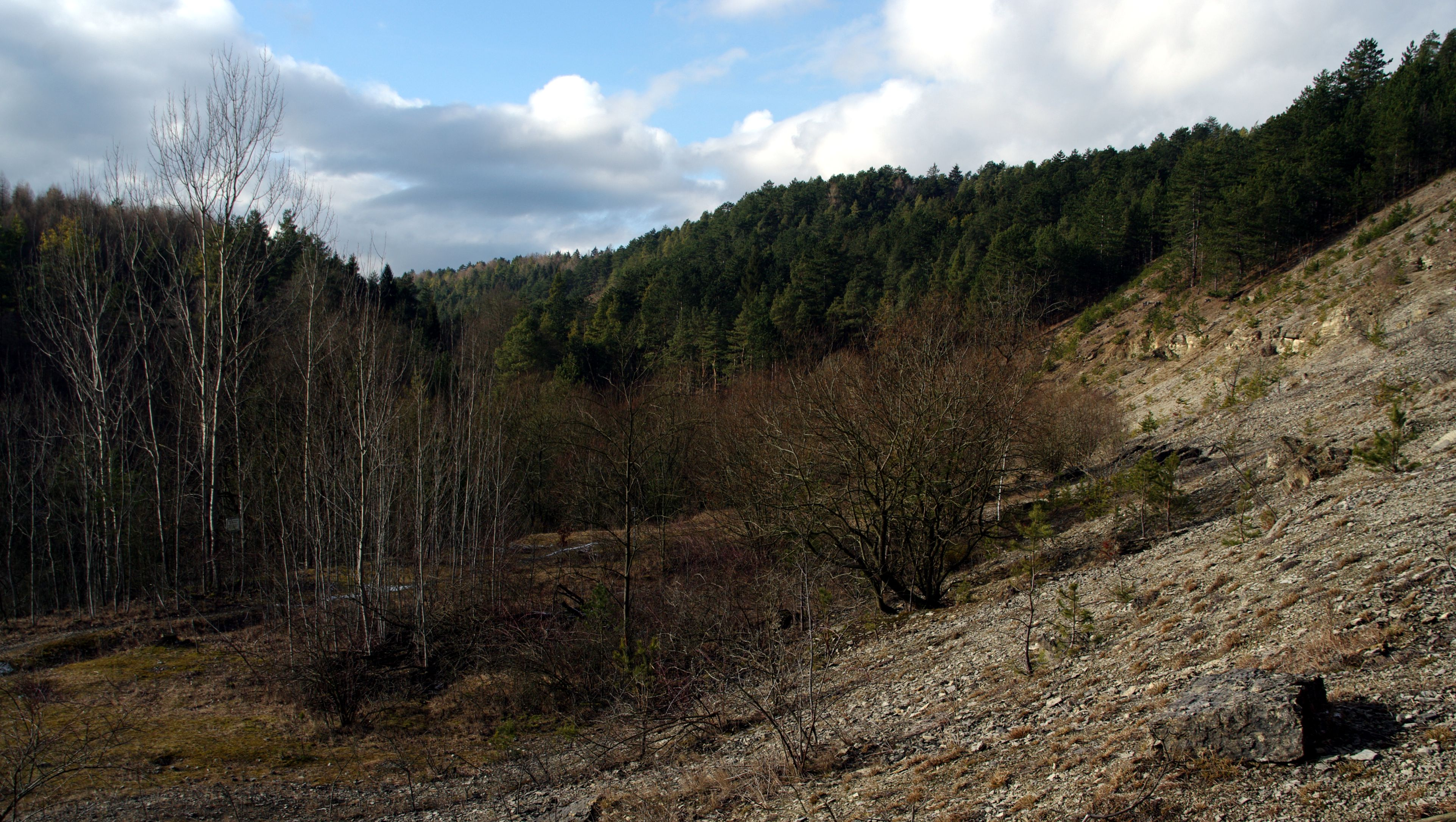
Jonas Valley between Crawinkel and Arnstadt

Jonastal (Jonas Valley), situated in the Ilm-Kreis district in Germany between Crawinkel and Arnstadt and near to the town of Ohrdruf, was a scene of military construction under the National Socialist regime during the last years of the Second World War. Thousands of prisoners from the Buchenwald concentration camp under the command of SS General Hans Kammler were forced to dig 25 tunnels into the surrounding mountain and the whole operation was performed under the strictest secrecy. The site was not completed and construction was abandoned before the end of the war.

The exact aim of the operation remains uncertain although it is now believed to have been either a potential final headquarters for the führer Adolf Hitler, a military communications post, or a possible center for V-2 rocket and Wunderwaffe weapon production and research. The underground complex may have been a location for electromagnetic and nuclear technology experiments. The reports of weapons testing are given additional credence by the fact that SS General Hans Kammler was in overall charge of the construction efforts.

On 2 November 1944, SS Reichsführer Heinrich Himmler arrived in his personal train with Kammler and the chief of Führer Headquarters Gustav Streve to inspect the site. Two days later, evacuation of the Ohrdruf military training ground together with the Crawinkel air munitions factory began.

Ohrdruf, its forced labour camp and the nearby Jonas Valley were captured by American troops on April 4, 1945, by the 4th Armored Division and the 89th Infantry Division. The camp was the first Nazi concentration camp liberated by the U.S. Army.

At the end of the war, the Soviet Army, which took over the site from the Americans, immediately classified it as a restricted zone and then used it as a military training ground. After the fall of the Berlin Wall, the site was taken over by the German armed forces who continue to use the area.

== Rumours ==
In 1962, East German officials interviewed contemporary witness who claimed to have sighted atomic weapons tests on the training ground in March 1945. Cläre Werner, for example, a former administrator of the adjacent Veste Wachsenburg, assured officials that she had seen a glowing light, as bright "as hundreds of bolts of lightning," red inside and yellow on the outside, at approximately 9:30 p.m. on March 4, 1945. Werner went on to describe how a powerful squall had moved across the mountains. The next day, she said, she and others in the areas had had nosebleeds, headaches, and sensations of pressure in their ears. She also claimed that she had heard another loud noise on March 12 at 10:15 p.m.

A book by Rainer Karlsch, Hitlers Bombe, published in 2005, alleges that Kurt Diebner's team tested some type of nuclear related device in Ohrdruf, which is very close to Jonastal.

The area has also been searched for the legendary Amber Room. The Amber Room was located in the Catherine Palace in Tsarskoye Selo near Saint Petersburg. It was a spectacularly beautiful room sometimes called the "Eighth Wonder of the world." The Amber Room was looted during World War II by Nazi Germany and brought to Königsberg. Knowledge of its whereabouts was lost in the chaos at the end of the war.

== Current status ==
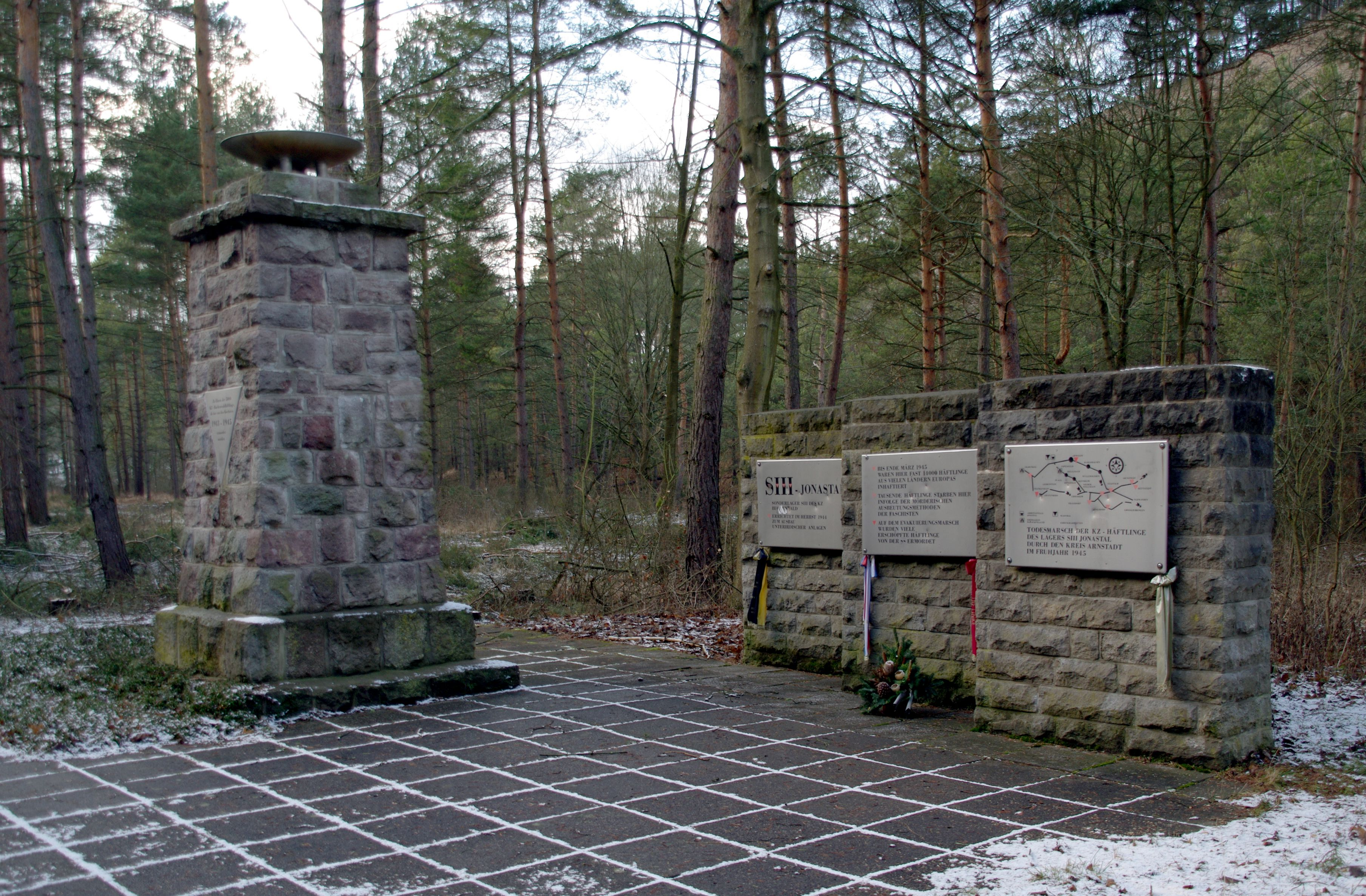
Jonas Valley Memorial

Jonastal itself remains within a military training area and entry is strictly prohibited. This, however, does not prevent the site from being regularly visited by explorers and would-be treasure hunters who risk arrest and a fine if caught.

Monuments have been erected in Jonastal and nearby and are dedicated to the victims of the nearby Ohrdruf camp.

== See also ==
- Project Riese, a set of seven unfinished Nazi-era underground works in southwest Poland
- Weingut I, an incomplete underground facility for manufacturing the Junkers Jumo 004 jet engine
- Anlage Süd, a Führer Headquarters site in southeast Poland, in proximity of the SS-Truppenübungsplatz Heidelager and various military production sites

== Literature ==
- Rainer Karlsch - Hitlers Bombe (March 2005) ISBN 3-421-05809-1
- John Douglas-Gray in his thriller The Novak Legacy (June 2011) ISBN 978-0-7552-1321-4
