= List of subcamps of Buchenwald =

The following is a list of the forced labor subcamps of the Nazi Buchenwald concentration camp.

| Name | Location | Company | Function |
|---|---|---|---|
| Aachen | Aachen | | Bomb demolition squads |
| Abteroda | Berka/Werra | BMW | Production of chemical explosives |
| Abteroda/Vitzeroda | Berka/Werra | BMW | Manufacture of aircraft engine parts |
| Allendorf | Stadtallendorf | Dynamit Nobel | Chemical products |
| Altenburg | Altenburg | HASAG | Manufacture of cartridge cases |
| Arolsen | Bad Arolsen | | Service personnel for the SS officers' school |
| Aschersleben | Aschersleben | Junkers | Production of aircraft and engines |
| Augustdorf (Sennelager) | Augustdorf | | Work for Panzer unit training and replacement |
| Bad Berka | Bad Berka | Thüringische Eisenbahn-AG | Railway work |
| Bad Gandersheim | Bad Gandersheim | Bruns-Apparatebau (branch of the Heinkel aircraft company) | Aircraft production |
| Bad Salzungen I | Bad Salzungen | OT-Bauleitung | Road construction |
| Bad Salzungen II | Bad Salzungen | OT-Sonder-Bauleitung | Potash mining |
| Bensberg | Bergisch Gladbach | OT-Bauleitung | Construction and repair work |
| Berga an der Elster | Berga | Brabag | Tunneling |
| Berlstedt | Berlstedt | SS-WVHA | Brick manufacturing, road construction |
| Bernburg / Plömnitz | Bernburg | OT-Bauleitung, Allgemeine Solvay-Werke | Concrete pouring |
| Billroda | Billroda | | Potash mining, construction |
| Blankenhain | Blankenhain | | Sand mining |
| Bochum I | Bochum | | Bomb demolition squads |
| Bochum II | Bochum | Eisen- und Hüttenwerke AG | Armor and steel production |
| Bochum III | Bochum | Bochumer Verein | Bullet manufacture |
| Böhlen | Böhlen | Brabag | Cleanup after an air raid |
| Braunschweig | Braunschweig | SS Junker School | Repair work |
| Colditz | Colditz | Hugo Schneider AG | Munitions factory |
| Crawinkel | Crawinkel | SS-WVHA | Quarry work and tunneling for railways |
| Dessau I | Dessau | Waggonbau Dessau | Manufacture of railway cars |
| Dessau II | Dessau | Junkers | Production of aircraft and engines |
| Dortmund I | Dortmund | | Bomb demolition squads |
| Dortmund II | Dortmund | Dortmund-Hörder Hüttenverein AG | Munitions factory |
| Duisburg | Duisburg | City of Duisburg | Bomb demolition and general work |
| Düsseldorf-Friedrichstadt I | Düsseldorf | SS and Police Leader, West Germany | Bomb demolition squads |
| Düsseldorf-Friedrichstadt II | Düsseldorf | SS-WVHA | Clearing debris |
| Düsseldorf-Grafenberg, Dinnendahlstraße-Schlüterstraße | Düsseldorf | Rheinmetall-Borsig AG | Parts manufacture for V-1 and V-2 missiles |
| Düsseldorf-Lohausen | Düsseldorf | SS and Police Leader, Düsseldorf | Blasting operations |
| Eisenach | Eisenach | BMW | Manufacture of aircraft engine parts |
| Elsnig | Elsnig | Westfälisch-Anhaltische Sprengstoff AG | Production of TNT explosives |
| Espenfeld | Ohrdruf | | Construction of tunnels in Jonas Valley |
| Essen I | Essen | SS-WVHA | Clearing debris, bomb demolition |
| Essen II | Essen | Krupp Gussstahlfabrik | General work in a steel mill |
| Flößberg bei Leipzig | Frohburg | Flössberger Metallwerke | Manufacture of ammunition and rocket-propelled grenades |
| Gelsenkirchen-Horst | Gelsenkirchen | Gelsenberg Benzin AG | Munitions factory, clearing debris |
| Gießen | Giessen | Medical and Training Division of the SS hospital | Construction of bunkers |
| Goslar | Goslar | | General work for the Luftwaffe air base command |
| Göttingen | Göttingen | | Work in the SS cavalry school |
| Hadmersleben | Hadmersleben | | Construction, airplane part manufacture |
| Halberstadt | Halberstadt | Junkers, Halberstadt | Manufacture of aircraft wings |
| Halberstadt ""B2"" | Halberstadt | | Road construction, tunnel expansion |
| Halberstadt-Zwieberge | Halberstadt | Malachite AG | Tunnel, road and railway construction |
| Halberstadt-Zwieberge | Halberstadt | OT-Bauleitung | Tunnel construction |
| Halle an der Saale | Halle | Siebel-Flugzeugwerke GmbH | Manufacture of aircraft wings |
| Hessisch Lichtenau | Hessisch Lichtenau | Dynamit Nobel, IG Farben | Munitions factory |
| Holzen bei Eschershausen | Holzen | OT-Bauleitung | Expansion of tunnels for arms production |
| Jena | Jena | RAW Jena | Locomotive repair |
| Kassel | Kassel | | Railway repair |
| Kassel-Druseltal | Kassel | | Construction of a command post for the SS and Police Leader |
| Köln I | Cologne | City of Cologne | Blasting operations, work in gas, electricity and water utilities, work at the airport |
| Köln II | Cologne | Various | Construction, debris removal and cleanup, repair of gas and water lines |
| Köln-Deutz | Cologne | Vereinigte Westdeutsche Waggonfabriken AG | Manufacture of motor vehicles, cleanup and defusing bombs |
| Köln-Niehl | Cologne | Ford Germany | Manufacture of motor vehicles, bricklaying, carpentry |
| Kranichfeld | Kranichfeld | SS-WVHA | Restoration of a castle in Kranichfeld |
| Langensalza | Bad Langensalza | Langenwerke AG, Junker | Manufacture and assembly of aircraft parts |
| Leipzig-Engelsdorf | Leipzig | | Armaments production |
| Leipzig-Schönau | Leipzig | Allgemeine Transportanlagen GmbH | Manufacture of aircraft parts |
| Leipzig-Schönefeld | Leipzig | Hugo Schneider AG | Production of anti-tank weapons and aircraft parts |
| Leipzig-Thekla | Leipzig | Erla Maschinenwerk | Manufacture of aircraft parts |
| Leopoldshall | Staßfurt | Junkers | Construction of aircraft control panels |
| Lichtenburg | Prettin | | Holding center for prisoners before Buchenwald camp was completed |
| Lippstadt I | Lippstadt | Westfälische Metall-Industrie AG | Manufacture of munitions and aircraft parts |
| Lippstadt II | Lippstadt | Lippstädter Eisen- und Metallwerke GmbH | Manufacture of munitions and aircraft parts |
| Lützkendorf | near Mücheln | Wintershall AG | Reconstruction of oil refinery after air raid |
| Magdeburg | Magdeburg | Polte-Werke | Munitions factory, clearing debris |
| Markkleeberg | Markkleeberg | Junkers | Manufacture of aircraft parts |
| Meuselwitz | Meuselwitz | Hugo Schneider AG | Production of bazookas and grenades |
| Mittelbau-Dora | Nordhausen | Mittelwerk GmbH, Junkers | Production of V1 flying bombs, V2 rocket assemblies, HE-162 jet engines |
| Mühlhausen I | Mühlhausen | Gerätebau GmbH | Manufacture of aircraft parts and detonators |
| Mühlhausen II | Mühlhausen | Mühlenwerke AG, Junkers | Manufacture of aircraft engine parts |
| Niederorschel | Niederorschel | Langenwerke AG | Work in a plywood mill |
| Nordhausen | Nordhausen | | Bomb demolition, clearing debris at air base |
| Oberndorf bei Hermsdorf | Kraftsdorf | Luftwaffen munitions plant | Loading, transporting and stacking bombs |
| Ohrdruf | Ohrdruf | SS-WVHA | Railway construction, excavation |
| Penig | Penig | Max Gerth Werke | Manufacture of aircraft |
| Raguhn bei Dessau | Raguhn | Heerbrandt Werke AG | Manufacture of aircraft parts |
| Rothenburg an der Saale | Rothenburg | Mansfeld AG für Bergbau und Hüttenbetrieb | Production of rifle and pistol ammunition |
| Saalfeld (""Fröhliches Tal"") | near Wurzbach | OT-Bauleitung | Tunnel construction |
| Schlieben | Schlieben | Hugo Schneider AG | Production of bazookas and grenades |
| Schönebeck/Elbe I | Schönebeck | Junkers | Manufacture of aircraft |
| Schönebeck/Elbe II | Schönebeck | Nationale Radiatoren | Manufacture of electrical components for the V-2 missile |
| Schwerte an der Ruhr | Schwerte | RAW Schwerte | Locomotive repair |
| Sömmerda | Sömmerda | Rheinmetall-Borsig AG | Munitions factory |
| Sonneberg-West | Sonneberg | GE Reinhardt | Manufacture of aircraft parts, sprockets for Tiger tanks, and gears for V-weapons |
| Staßfurt (Neustaßfurt) | Staßfurt | OT-Bauleitung | Construction |
| Suhl | Suhl | Gustloff-Werke | Construction |
| Tannroda | Bad Berka | Mitteldeutsche Papierwerke | Paper mill |
| Taucha | Taucha | Hugo Schneider AG | Production of ammunition and rocket-propelled grenades |
| Tonndorf | Tonndorf | | Construction, quarry work, plumbing |
| Torgau | Torgau | Heeres-Munitionsanstalt | Explosives production |
| Tröglitz, Gemeinde Rehmsdorf | Elsteraue | Brabag | Bomb demolition, clearing debris, road and railway construction |
| Unna | Unna | | Work for the 5th SS Corps' news department |
| Usingen | Usingen | | Construction of a tunnel and bunker system |
| Weferlingen | Weferlingen | Bauleitung Gerhard | Production of engines for aircraft and U-boats |
| Weimar | Weimar | Gustloff-Werke | Production of infantry vehicles, gun barrels, rifle parts, and mortars |
| Wernigerode | Wernigerode | Rautal-Werke GmbH | Cast iron production |
| Westeregeln | Westeregeln | Junkers | Construction of an underground plant for Junkers aircraft and engines |
| Witten-Annen | Witten-Annen | Ruhrstahl AG | Steel for aircraft production, tank parts, and metal processing |
| Wolfen | Wolfen | IG-Farben | Pulp and cotton production |

== See also ==
- List of Nazi concentration camps
