= Sandor Berger =

Writer

Sandor Berger (1925–2006) was a Hungarian-born Australian outsider writer and poet.

== Biography ==
Berger was born in Csenger, Hungary on 7 July 1925 to Simon Berger and Jozefa Pepi Berger (née Schoner). He had two brothers, Elemer and Miksa, who had moved to Argentina before the arrival of the Nazis in Hungary. He also had two sisters, Olga and Rosa Muenz. Berger was taken to Auschwitz concentration camp with his family in 1944, and later to Ohrdruf concentration camp, a subcamp of Buchenwald concentration camp. Olga, their parents, and grandparents were murdered at Auschwitz. Rosa survived the Auschwitz and Mauthausen concentration camps and later emigrated to Canada in 1949.

Berger was liberated in 1946 and returned to Hungary before moving to Germany. In 1949 he moved to Australia.

In the early 1950s Berger moved to Sydney. He worked at many jobs, but was driven to self-publish numbers books and booklets of poetry, as well as his letters to newspaper editors.

In 1964 Berger was featured in a television documentary The Glittering Mile.

Berger had lifelong battles with the authorities and served time in prison. It is uncertain what medical diagnoses were made, but he appears to have suffered from a persecution complex for much of his life in Australia. He was a well-known sight on Sydney streets, wearing a placards and handing out leaflets with the message "Psychiatry is Evil".

Sandor Berger died in 2006 and was buried in a public grave at Rookwood Cemetery.

== Bibliography ==
- Poems 1950-1955, Sandor Berger, Bondi Junction, 1956
- Poems of Sandor Berger, 1950-1955, Sandor Berger, Bondi Junction, 1956
- The Second Book of Poems (1955-1958) Sandor Berger, Sydney, 1958
- I Protest: A Complete Collection of Letters & Articles which the Author Penned and Sent to the Press... in the City of Sydney,... Under the Name Sandor Berger, Alexander Mountain, Sydney, 1962
- Poems of a Decade: Australia, 1952-1962, Sandor Berger, Sydney, 1962
- An Appendix of Prose: Supplement to I Protest, Some More Letters and Articles, Printlike Duplicating Service, Kings Cross, Sydney), 1964
- An Appendix to an Appendix of Prose; a Supplement to a Supplement of I Protest, Interstellar Publications, Sydney, [1968]
- A Fore-runner to the Full-length Book on the Subject of the Great Psychoatrick Fraeud, Interstellar (Sydney), 1970 (criticism)
- Sandor Berger to the Rest of Australia, in the City of Sydney N.S.W, Sandor Berger, Sydney, 1971 (correspondence)
- An Appeal to the High Court of Australia, Sandor Berger, Sydney, 1971 (diary)
- Sandor Berger in the Prison of Long Bay Jail, Sydney, NSW, 1968-1969, Interstellar Publications, Sydney, 1971
- Springtime in May : An Erotic Musical Play of Love, Interstellar Publications, Sydney, 1971
- Family Life : A Film Review, Interstellar Publications, Sydney, 1972
- Christmas, 1975: A Prose Poem, Sandor Berger, Sydney, [1975]
- A Scratchment of Poems in Free Verse: Australia 1955-75, Sandor Berger, Sydney, [1976]
