= Raymond G. Stokes =

American historian

- Born: 1956 (age 69–70); Pittsburgh, Pennsylvania, U.S.
- Education: Ohio State University
- Occupation: Business historian

Raymond G. Stokes Ph.D FAcSS, (Born 1956, Pittsburgh), is an American academic historian and the current Chair of Business History and Director of the Centre for Business History in Scotland at the University of Glasgow.

== Early life ==
Raymond G. Stokes was born in 1956. He holds a Ph.D from the Ohio State University.

== Career ==
Stokes taught at Case Western Reserve University and the Rensselaer Polytechnic Institute, where he received tenure. In 1995, he joined the University of Glasgow.

Stokes has been the President of the European Business History Association, the Editor-in-Chief of the Zeitschrift für Untenehmensgeschichte, and served on the Council of the Association of Business Historians. He recently served as Editor-in-Chief of the leading journal in the field, Business History. He is the author or co-author of seven books, some of which have been written in, or translated into, German.

Stokes is the director of the Centre for Business History in Scotland (CBH), Scotland’s only research unit in the discipline, with 13 full members engaged in teaching and research. The prime objective of the CBH is to encourage, facilitate and conduct research in all aspects of business history, with particular emphasis on corporate governance, innovation and organisational change. CBH was established following thirty years of investment in business history, which culminated in 1987 in the founding and funding of centre and library within the Department of Economic and Social history at Glasgow University. Tony Slaven was appointed as the inaugural Director of the Centre, also holding the Chair in Business History. Notably, CBH was one of the first permanently funded research centres, and consequently independent of the need to secure funds by accepting commissioned business histories. Stokes succeeded Slaven upon the latter's retirement in 2005.

His research interests are primarily in German Business History, in particular business during the Third Reich, and comparisons of technology, innovation and the environment in Germany and America from 1933 to 1990. Most recently he has made headlines for a project examining the links between Thalidomide and Nazi Germany.

== Works ==
- Stokes, R. G., and Banken, R. (2016) Building On Air: The International Industrial Gases Industry, 1886-2006. Cambridge University Press ISBN 9781107033122
- Stokes, R.G., Köster, R., and Sambrook, S. (2013) The Business of Waste: Great Britain and Germany, 1945 to the Present. Cambridge University Press. ISBN 9781107027213
- Abelshauser, W., Von Hippel, W., Johnson, J.A., and Stokes, R.G. (2004) German Industry and Global Enterprise. BASF: the History of a Company. Cambridge University Press. ISBN 9780521827263
- Karlsch, R., and Stokes, R.G. (2003) Faktor Öl: die Mineralölwirtschaft in Deutschland von 1859 bis 1974. Beck. ISBN 9783406502767
- Stokes, R.G., (2000) Constructing Socialism: Technology and Change in East Germany, 1945-1990. Johns Hopkins University Press. ISBN 0801863910.
- Stokes, R.G., (1994) Opting for Oil: The Political Economy of Technological Change in the West German Industry, 1945–1961. Cambridge University Press. ISBN 9780521025768
- Stokes, R.G., (1988) Divide and Prosper: The Heirs of I.G. Farben Under Allied Authority, 1945-1951. University of California Press. ISBN 0520062485
