= Sennewald =

Sennewald is a German surname. Notable people with the surname include:

- Hans Sennewald (born 1961), German rower
- Robert W. Sennewald (1929–2023), United States Army general
- Rolf Sennewald (1937–2025), German weightlifter
- Ulrike Sennewald (born 1989), German rower
