= European Business History Association =

Academic association

The European Business History Association (EBHA) is an academic association devoted to business history in Europe. It holds annual congresses (called conferences until 2013) and a bi-annual doctoral summer school. It is registered as a Scottish charity. Its constitution states its objectives as "to advance the education of the public concerning all aspects of the history of business and management in Europe and to promote research into all such aspects". Its aim is the organisation of conferences and seminars, the publication of a newsletter and other material girls, the encouragement of research in all aspects of business history, and specifically the promotion of collaborative projects based in several European countries such as The Performance of European Business in the 20th Century project per instance. The association was established to enhance inter-European contacts and promote extra-European links among business historians, to encourage the exchange of business history graduate students and to promote teaching and interest in all such aspects.

== History of the association ==
The discussions to establish a European Business History Association followed in the wake of the successful foundation of the Association of Business Historians in Britain. Informal talks between Hans Pohl (University of Bonn), Geoffrey Jones (then at the University of Reading), and Tony Slaven (University of Glasgow) resulted in an invited meeting of representatives from a number of European countries in October 1993. This meeting was hosted and chaired by Tony Slaven at the Centre for Business History in Glasgow. The participants were not representative in any objective sense, but were those known to the organisers. They were Rolv Petter Amdam (BI Norwegian Business School, Norway), Michael Bibikov (Russia), Per Boje (Denmark), Hans Pohl (Germany), Keetie Sluyterman (University of Utrecht, Netherlands), Mary Rose, Geoff Jones and Tony Slaven (UK). That meeting reviewed models for an EBHA, objectives, and necessary steps to shape and establish a new association. Subsequent meetings chaired by Tony Slaven followed rapidly in Bonn in February 1994 and in Rotterdam in June 1994. By this time the initial group had been joined by François Crouzet (France), Ulf Olsson (Sweden), and Even Lange (Norway). The meeting in Rotterdam at Erasmus University in June 1994 established the first draft of objectives, the conditions of membership, the structure to be adopted for office bearers and members of the council, and election procedures. The Erasmus meeting also decided that it was necessary to take the proposals to a wider forum to gain support for the creation of a European Business History Association; it was also decided to establish a steering committee to plan a first conference.

The Business History Conference held at Erasmus University in October 1994 was taken as the opportunity to present the proposals to a large representative group of business historians drawn from many European countries. Tony Slaven acted as spokesman for the steering group and presented proposals to a general meeting at the Erasmus conference. The conference gave its support to the proposals and to the existing planning group to act as a steering committee to bring the European Business History Association into being. The first newsletter was planned for October 1995 and an inaugural conference was planned for August/September 1996. The working group was established as an interim council of the proposed EBHA for a period of two years from October 1995. Further planning meetings of the interim council took place in the University of Reading in March 1995 and Matthias Kipping was adopted as the first editor of the EBHA Newsletter. At that meeting in Reading it was agreed to hold the inaugural conference in August 1996 to be hosted by Ulf Olsson in the University of Gothenburg. A subsequent meeting in London in July 1996 was held to discuss potential collaboration with Manfred Pohl representing the new established Centre for European Business History based in Frankfurt. At that time, however, it was agreed to develop the interests of the new groups independently.

== Membership ==
Membership is open to any individual interested in business history. EBHA has over 200 members drawn from 29 different European and non-European countries.

== The Alliance of Centres for Business History in Europe ==
At the EBHA congress in Uppsala (2013), Centres for Business History and Business History Groups at European Universities and Business Schools have created a network in order to (1.) improve communication and exchange between the large research groups in Business History; (2.) improve co-operation and institutional support in research and teaching; (3) improve PhD education in Business History. The Alliance is a network under the umbrella of the EBHA and it is open to all European research environments in Business History with at least four Tenured positions within the respective University/Business School. These centres/groups are facing common challenges within their University/Business School, and they provide environments allowing for collaboration beyond conventional academic networking. The Alliance meets annually in connection to the EBHA Congress.

- Copenhagen, Denmark: Centre for Business History, Copenhagen Business School

The Centre for Business History was established in 1999 with the objective to strengthen the historical dimension in CBS research and teaching. Today, it consists of eight professors and five PhD and postdoc researchers that share a keen interest in the way history contributes to a better understanding of society and business.

- Glasgow, Scotland: Centre for Business History in Scotland

The Centre for Business History in Scotland (CBHS), inaugurated in 1987, is Scotland’s only research unit in the discipline and counts as full members 13 business historians engaged in teaching and research. The prime objective of the CBH is to encourage, facilitate and conduct research in all aspects of business history, with particular emphasis on corporate governance, innovation and organisational change.

- Milan, Italy: Bocconi Business History group

The Bocconi Business History group is based at Bocconi University, Milan (www.unibocconi.it), in the Department of Policy Analysis and Public Management. The group consists of tenured and non-tenured scholars doing research in various fields of business history. The group is active in the organisation of conferences and seminars both at national and international level. Broadly speaking, the research interests of its members include topics as entrepreneurship, history of fashion and creative industries, international business, family business and State-owned enterprises.

- Oslo, Norway: Centre for Business History

Centre for Business History (CBH) at BI Norwegian Business School in Oslo was established in 1989 and, with a staff of 14 historians and 1 research coordinator, constitutes the largest group of economic and business historians in Norway. The Centre is a part of the Department of Innovation and Economic Organization at BI. CBH aims to improve the understanding of business institutions, interactions between companies and society as well as the dynamics of economic development. The research includes economic, political, social and cultural perspectives.

The main part of the research is commissioned work, organised in a way which shall secure the academic freedom of the researcher, through standardised contracts and also with book committees commenting on the manuscripts.

- Reading, England: Centre for International Business History (CIBH), Henley Business School at the University of Reading

Established in 1997 and part of Henley Business School at the University of Reading, the Centre for International Business History (CIBH) is the largest business history centre in the United Kingdom. CIBH strives to promote the study of the evolution of business and management in an international and comparative context. The Centre's nine members mainly focus on various aspects of international business history, particularly on topics related to retailing, consumer goods industries, entrepreneurship, intellectual property, industrial finance, small firms, creative industries, and industrial clusters/districts. CIBH staff play active roles in various national and international business and economic history associations and are active participants at the main international conferences in these areas.

- Rotterdam, The Netherlands: Business History @ Erasmus [University of Rotterdam]

Business History @ Erasmus brings together researchers with an interest in the history of business. The platform is an initiative by the School of History, Culture & Communication and the Rotterdam School of Management, both at Erasmus University Rotterdam, in the Netherlands.

- Uppsala, Sweden: Uppsala Centre for Business History (UCBH)

Uppsala Centre for Business History (UCBH) is organizationally and economically associated with the Department of Economic History at Uppsala University. A large part of the research focuses on questions about the establishment and development of organisations and markets, primarily within the banking and financial sector of the economy. The dynamic interaction between organisations and institutions, both formal and informal, is considered an important factor in the analysis of development.

- Utrecht, The Netherlands: Business History at Utrecht University

Business History at Utrecht University focuses on the historical development of companies and entrepreneurs in their institutional context. As part of Economic and Social History (ESH) business history links to the central debate on the question why some countries are poor and others are rich. What is the role of business in economic growth and prosperity? Business History at UU is therefore closely related to the Centre for Global Economic History, the platform of the UU for pioneering research into the long term evolution of the world economy and its components. Business history is also an important part of the Commissioned Research group, which conducts research for third parties. This research often focuses on individual companies or sectors in their relationship to society. From these two perspectives business historians in Utrecht find their strength in the interaction between the scientific debate and individual case studies.

- York, England: Centre for the evolution of Global Business and Institutions (CEGBI)

The Centre for Evolution of Global Business and Institutions (CEGBI) was inaugurated in 2009 with the aim of contributing with research to the understanding of how businesses and institutions around the world evolve, and also of helping to inform current management and policy issues. CEGBI’s main areas of research are international business history; global marketing; and governance, entrepreneurship and social enterprise. Distinctive features of CEGBI’s research include its interdisciplinarity and methodologies. It engages with topics of interest to business and management, economics, history, sociology, and law.

== conferences ==
The inaugural conference in Gothenburg in August 1996 attracted over 230 participants by which time the initial paid up membership of the new EBHA was 214 members. First nominations and elections for council added Franco Amatori (Bocconi University), Albert Carreras (Pompeu Fabra University), Wilfried Feldenkirchen, Ritta Hjerppe (Helsinki School of Economics), and Matthias Kipping to the first formally elected council. Tony Slaven was adopted as first President of EBHA with Geoff Jones as the first Secretary/Treasurer. It was decided in 1998 to hold an annual conference beginning with that held at Terni. Since then the association has met annually.

== Past conferences ==
- 1996 – Gothenburg, Sweden
- 1998 – Terni, Italy
- 1999 – Rotterdam, The Netherlands
- 2000 – Bordeaux, France
- 2001 – Oslo, Norway
- 2002 – Helsinki, Finland
- 2003 – Lowell, US (Joint with BHC)
- 2004 – Barcelona, Spain
- 2005 – Frankfurt, Germany
- 2006 – Copenhagen, Denmark
- 2007 – Geneva, Switzerland
- 2008 – Bergen, Norway
- 2009 – Milan, Italy
- 2010 – Glasgow, Scotland
- 2011 – Athens, Greece
- 2012 – Paris, France (Joint with the Business History Society of Japan)
- 2013 – Uppsala, Sweden
- 2014 – Utrecht, The Netherlands
- 2015 - Miami, USA
- 2016 - Bergen, Norway
- 2017 - Vienna, Austria
- 2018 - Ancona, Italy
- 2019 - Rotterdam, The Netherlands
- 2020 - Econgress
- 2021 - 2nd World Congress of Business History - online
- 2022 - Madrid, Spain
- 2023 - Oslo, Norway
- 2024 - Lisbon and Carcavelos, Portugal
- 2025 - Brussels, Belgium
- 2026 - 3rd World Congress of Business History - Toronto, Canada

== Past presidents of the EBHA ==
- 1993–1997 Tony Slaven, University of Glasgow, Scotland
- 1998–1999 Geoffrey Jones, Harvard Business School, US
- 2000–2001 Franco Amatori, Bocconi University, Italy
- 2002–2003 Keetie Sluyterman, University of Utrecht, The Netherlands
- 2004–2005 Mary Rose, Lancaster University, England
- 2006–2007 Youssef Cassis, University of Geneva, Switzerland
- 2008–2009 Per Boje, University of Southern Denmark
- 2010–2011 Albert Carreras, Universitat Pompeu Fabra, Spain
- 2011–2013 Harm G. Schroeter, University of Bergen, Norway
- 2013–2015 Ray Stokes, University of Glasgow, Scotland
- 2016–2017 Andrea H. Schneider-Braunberger, Gesellschaft für Unternehmensgeschichte, Germany
- 2018–2019 Ludovic Cailluet, Edhec Business School, France
- 2020–2021 Andrea Colli, Bocconi University, Italy
- 2022– Adoración Álvaro Moya, CUNEF University, Spain

== Comparable associations ==
Other associations devoted to business history operate at national and international levels:

- Association of Business Historians
- Business History Conference
- Associacion Espanola de Historia Economica (Spain)
- Association Francaise des Historiens Economistes (France)
- International Economic History Association
- Gesellschaft für Unternehmensgeschichte e.V. (Society for Business History, Germany)
- Business History Society of Japan
