= Lindenthal =

Lindenthal may refer to:

- Lindenthal, Cologne, a borough of the City of Cologne, Germany
- a suburb of Leipzig, site of a subcamp of Buchenwald
- Gustav Lindenthal
