= Manfred Riedel =

German university teacher and writer (1936–2009)

- Born: May 10, 1936
- Died: May 11, 2009 (aged 73)

Academic background
- Education: Heidelberg University (PhD)
- Thesis: Theorie und Praxis im Denken Hegels (1960)
- Doctoral advisor: Karl Löwith

Academic work
- Era: Contemporary philosophy
- Region: Western philosophy
- School or tradition: German Idealism
- Institutions: Martin Luther University Halle-Wittenberg

Manfred Riedel (10 May 1936, Etzoldshain - 11 May 2009, Erlangen) was a German philosopher.

== Life ==
Riedel studied from 1954 to 1957 philosophy, history, German studies, psychology, and sociology at the Karl Marx University, Leipzig, among others with Ernst Bloch, Hans Mayer, and Hermann August Korff. In 1957 he fled the GDR to Heidelberg (Republikflucht). There he continued his studies at the Ruprecht Karl University with Karl Löwith, Hans-Georg Gadamer, Arthur Henkel, and Werner Conze. In 1960 he received his doctorate under Löwith with a dissertation on "Theorie und Praxis im Denken Hegels". Contrary to the general trend of the 1960s, Riedel did not interpret Hegel from Marx but rather from the old European traditions of practical philosophy going back to Aristotle. In 1968 he completed his habilitation at the University of Heidelberg with a thesis on the topic Bourgeois Society: A Category of Classical Politics and Modern Natural Law.

After teaching positions at the universities of Heidelberg, Marburg and Saarbrücken, Riedel became a full professor of philosophy at the University of Erlangen–Nuremberg in 1970. In 1980/81 he held the Theodor Heuss Professorship at The New School for Social Research in New York City. This was followed by guest professorships in Turin, Rome, Venice and Atlanta, Georgia. In 1992/93 he was a professor at the Friedrich Schiller University Jena, and in 1992 he received the chair of Practical Philosophy at Martin Luther University Halle-Wittenberg. Riedel retired in 2004.

From 1991 to 2003 Riedel was president of the Martin-Heidegger-Gesellschaft, and from 2005 a member of the Istituto Italiano di Scienze Umane (SUM) in Florence.

== Research and teaching ==
Riedel was a philosopher who developed a distinctive philosophical approach primarily through his art of interpreting classical texts and is thus considered a later exponent of the Humboldtian university tradition. For him the central concern of philosophy was not the concept of a school but the concept of the world. Looking back to antiquity, Riedel was connected to German idealism—especially Kant and Hegel—and to post-idealist philosophy such as Nietzsche, Dilthey, and Heidegger.

His research focused on three main areas:

1. The History and Development of the Basic Form of European Civil Society in Antiquity, the Middle Ages, and the Modern Era.
2. Studies on the history of the development of the modern humanities and their methods, in which he seeks a way out of the false dichotomy between contemporary hermeneutic and analytical modes of thought.
3. A return to the original anarchic sources of a “second” philosophy of Old Europe—one rooted in myth, mystery religions, and art—as opposed to the “first” (archontic) philosophy, which, from Aristotle to Husserl, presents itself with the claim to justification of apodictically rigorous science.

He linked this third area of focus—which he viewed as an alternative to the emerging “anarchy of thought” in postmodernism since the late 1980s—to a series of studies on the relationship between philosophy and poetry in ancient Greece and in modern European poetry, ranging from Goethe and Hölderlin through Leopardi to Rilke and George. Riedel initiated several international conferences, such as on the relationship between philology and philosophy in Nietzsche (Naumburg 1994), on hermeneutics in the Age of Enlightenment (1996), nature and art in Nietzsche's thought (2001), Heidegger and German Idealism (2002), and Philosophy, Medicine, and Psychology (2003).

== Honours ==
- Doctor honoris causa multiplex (Dr. h. c. mult.)
- Italian Nietzsche Prize 1990 (shared with Richard Rorty)
- Festschrift zum 60. Geburtstag: Inmitten der Zeit. Würzburg 1996
- Festschrift zum 65. Geburtstag: Verstehen in Wort und Schrift. Europäische Denkgespräche – Für Manfred Riedel . Hrsg. von Harald Seubert Weimar 2004

== Selected publications ==
- Riedel, Manfred (1984). Between tradition and revolution : the Hegelian transformation of political philosophy. Internet Archive. Cambridge [Cambridgeshire] ; New York : Cambridge University Press. ISBN 978-0-521-25644-5.

== Literature ==
- Hans-Helmuth Gander: Europa und die Philosophie. Verlag V. Klostermann, 1993, ISBN 978-3-465-02571-9, S. 248
