= Americanization of the European Economy =

2005 book by Harm G. Schroeter

- Author: Harm G. Schroeter
- Original title: Americanization of the European Economy. A Compact Survey of American Economic Influence in Europe Since the 1880s
- Language: English
- Subject: Americanization
- Published: 2005
- Publisher: Springer Science+Business Media
- Pages: 268
- ISBN: 9781402029349

Americanization of the European Economy. A Compact Survey of American Economic Influence in Europe Since the 1880s is a 2005 book by Harm G. Schroeter focusing, as the title implies, on the economic aspect of the Americanization of Europe.
