= D. C. Coleman =

British economic historian

Donald Cuthbert Coleman (21 January 1920 – 3 September 1995) was a British economic historian.

After attending The Haberdashers' Aske's Boys' School, an independent school in Elstree in Hertfordshire, Coleman served in the Royal Artillery in Africa, Italy and Greece during World War II, reaching the rank of major. He gained his first degree and PhD at the London School of Economics and was appointed to a post there of Lecturer in Industrial History in 1951. He stayed at LSE as Reader and (1969–1971) Professor of Economic History, and then moved to the University of Cambridge as Professor of Economic History and Fellow of Pembroke College in 1971, taking early retirement in 1981 to concentrate on his scholarly work. He was editor of the Economic History Review 1967–72.

The annual Coleman Prize of the Association of Business Historians is named in his memory.

== Selected publications ==
- The British paper industry, 1495–1860 : a study in industrial growth (1958, Clarendon)
- Sir John Banks, Baronet and Businessman: a Study of Business, Politics and Society in Later Stuart England (1963, Clarendon) (on Sir John Banks, 1st Baronet)
- Courtaulds: an economic and social history (on Courtaulds)
  - Vol 1: The nineteenth century: silk and crape (1969, Clarendon)
  - Vol 2: Rayon (1969, Clarendon)
  - Vol 3: Crisis and change, 1940–1965 (1980, Clarendon, ISBN 0199201110)
- The Economy of England, 1450–1750 (1977, Oxford UP, ISBN 0192153552)
