= Ohrdruf =

- Town
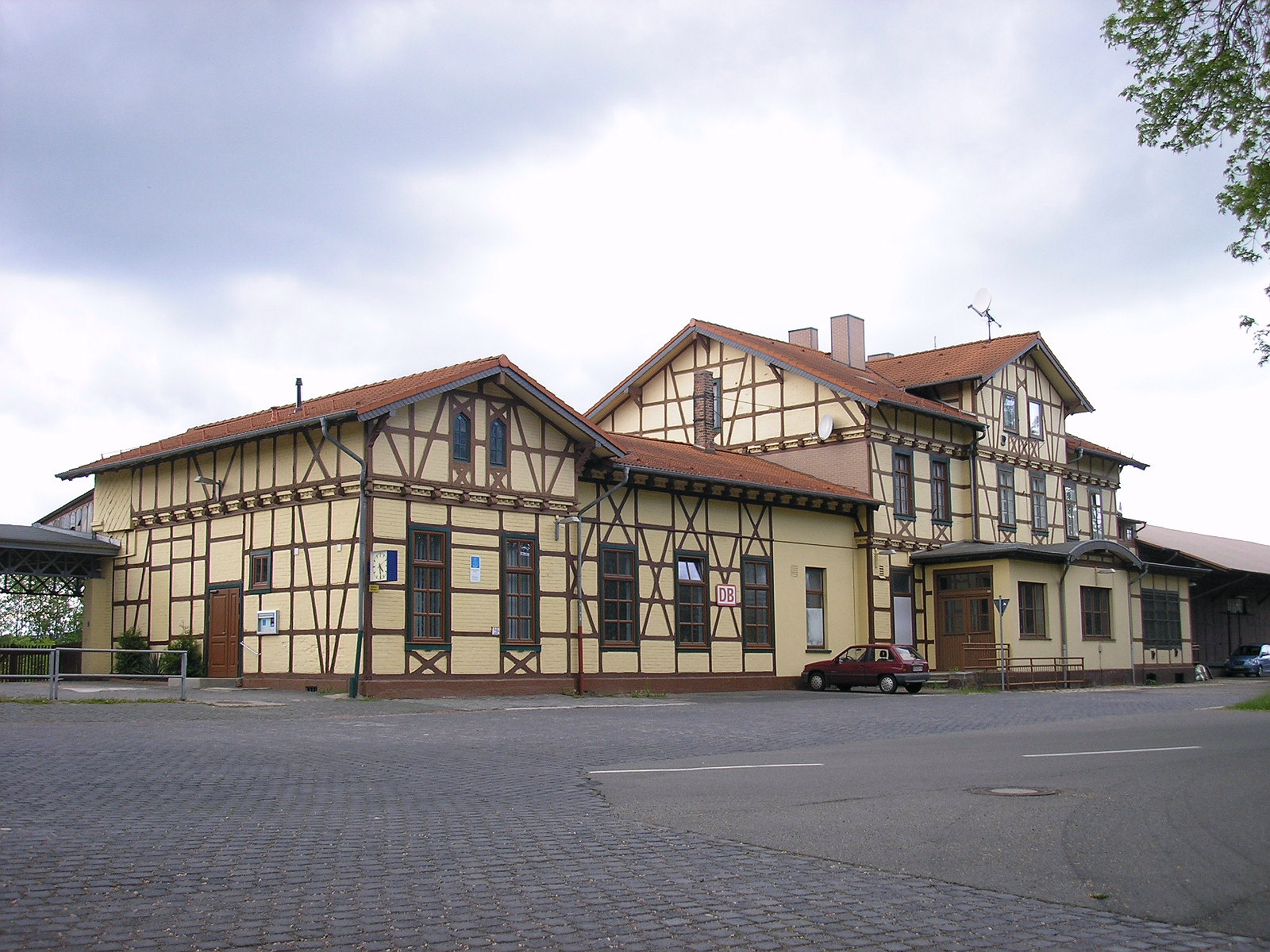
- Railway station

- Coat of arms

- Location of Ohrdruf within Gotha district
- Interactive map of Ohrdruf
- Location within Germany Location within Thuringia
- Coordinates: 50°49′41″N 10°43′58″E
- Country: Germany
- State: Thuringia
- District: Gotha

Government
  - Mayor (2024–30): Stefan Schambach (SPD)

Area
  - Total: 113.6 km^{2} (43.9 sq mi)
- Elevation: 375 m (1,230 ft)

Population (2025-12-31)
  - Total: 9,991
  - Density: 87.95/km^{2} (227.8/sq mi)
- Time zone: UTC+01:00 (CET)
  - Summer (DST): UTC+02:00 (CEST)
- Postal codes: 99885
- Dialling codes: 03624
- Vehicle registration: GTH
- Website: www.ohrdruf.de

Ohrdruf (German: [ˈoːɐ̯dʁʊf]) is a small town in the district of Gotha in the German state of Thuringia. It lies some 30 km southwest of Erfurt at the foot of the northern slope of the Thuringian Forest. The former municipalities Crawinkel, Gräfenhain and Wölfis were merged into Ohrdruf in January 2019.

== History ==
=== Medieval and early modern ===
Ohrdruf was reportedly founded in 724–726 by Saint Boniface, as the site of the first monastery in Thuringia, dedicated to Saint Michael. It was the first of several religious foundations in the town, the latest of which is the Carmelite monastery Karmel St. Elija (founded 1991).

Ohrdruf received municipal rights in 1399. In 1550, under Georg II von Gleichen work began on Schloss Ehrenstein at the site of the former 8th century monastery.

During the 17th century, the Schloss fell to the Grafen von Hohenlohe who after 1760 made alterations to it in Baroque style.

In 1695, the orphaned Johann Sebastian Bach came to live and attend school at Ohrdruf, under the care of his older brother Johann Christoph Bach (1671–1721), who had come here in 1690 as organist at the St. Michaelis Kirche (St Michael's Church) and as a teacher at the Lyceum. Johann Sebastian lived in Ohrdruf from the ages of 10 to 15.

=== 19th century ===
In the 19th century, the town became a centre of toy manufacturing. The Kewpie doll was produced here from 1913. There are still some old molds embedded in the facades of Ohrdruf buildings.

In 1869, the Hohenlohe family sold the Grafschaft Gleichen including the castle and town of Ohrdruf to the Duchy of Saxe-Gotha.

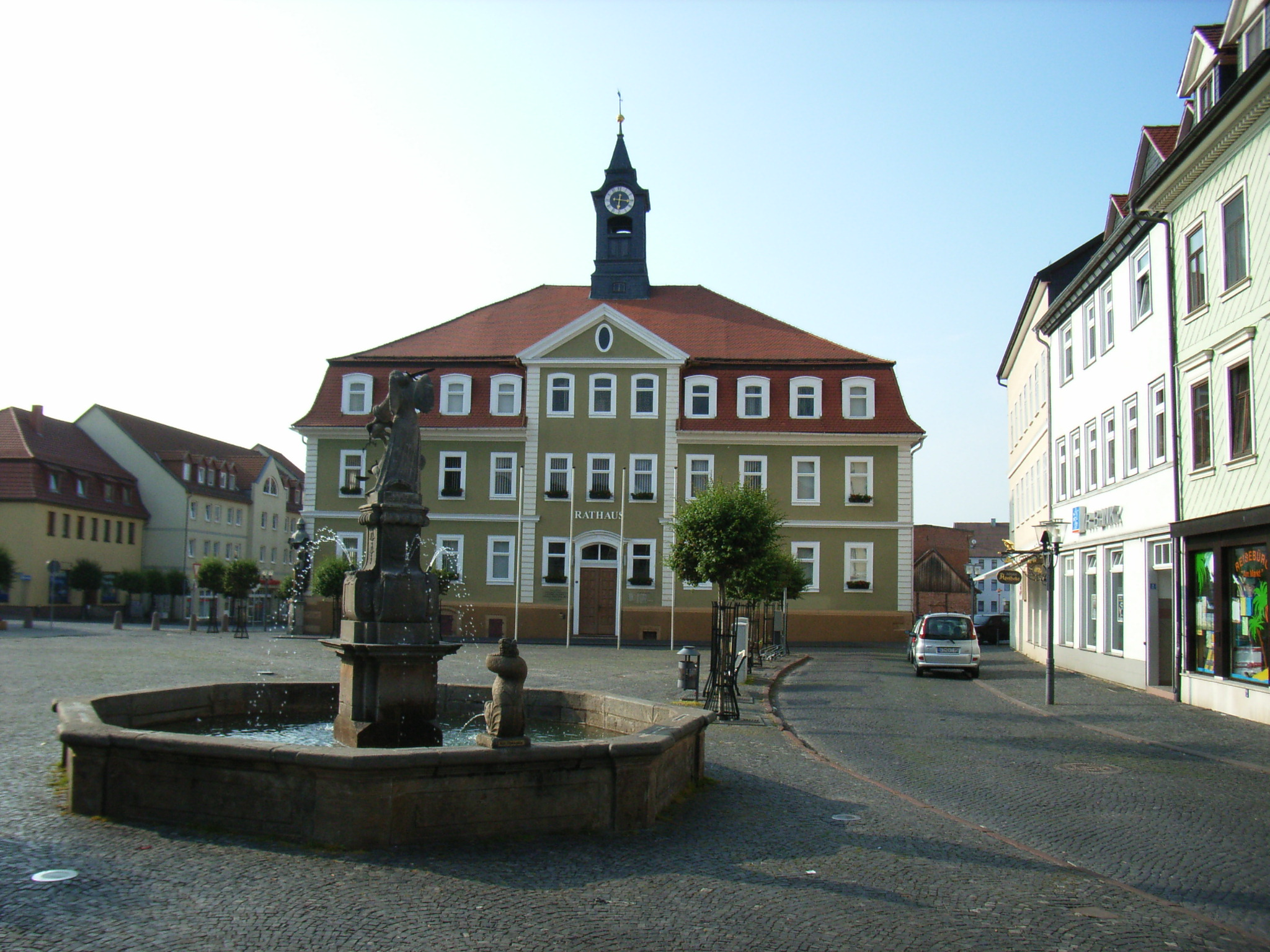
Ohrdruf Town Hall

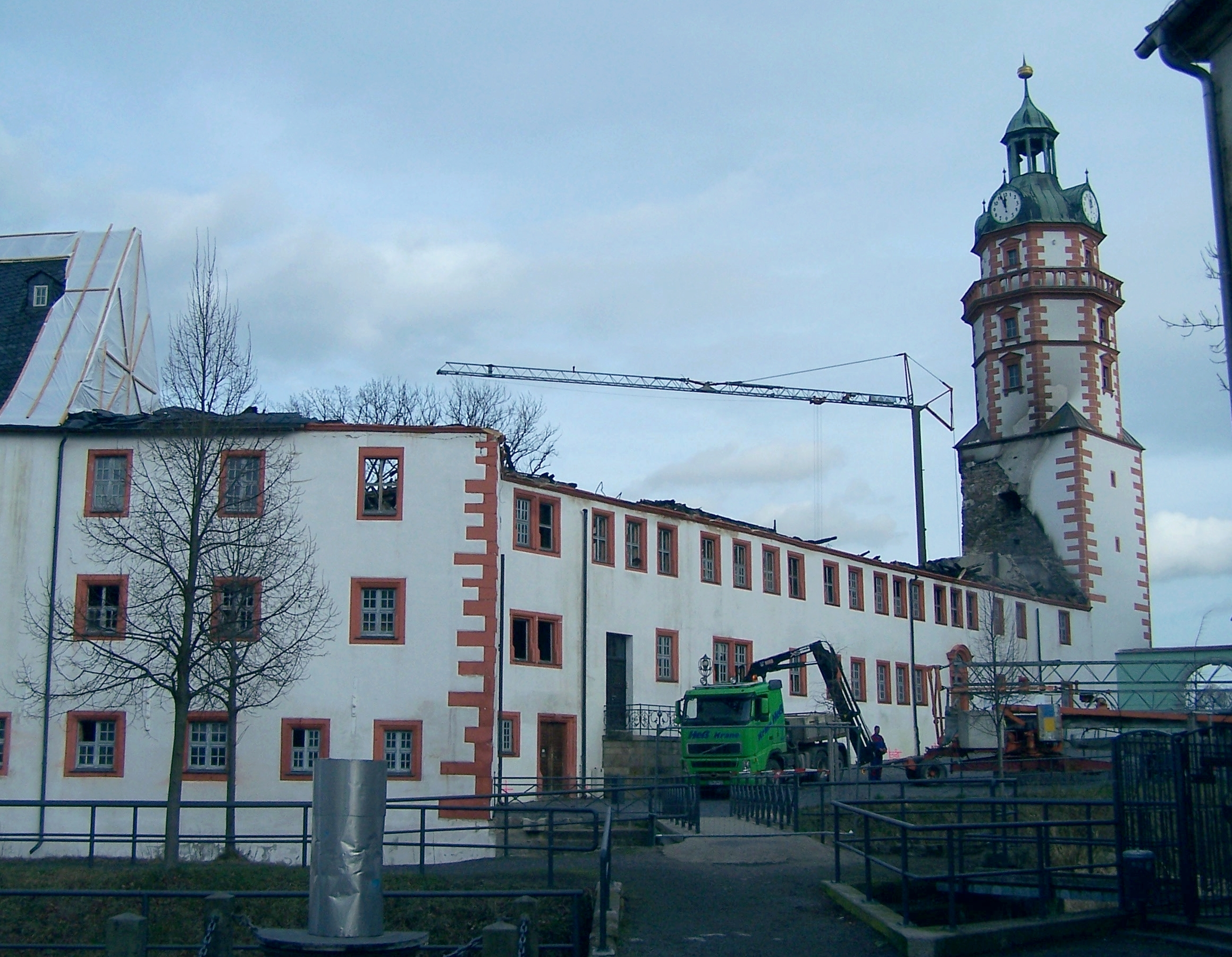
Schloss Ehrenstein after the recent fire

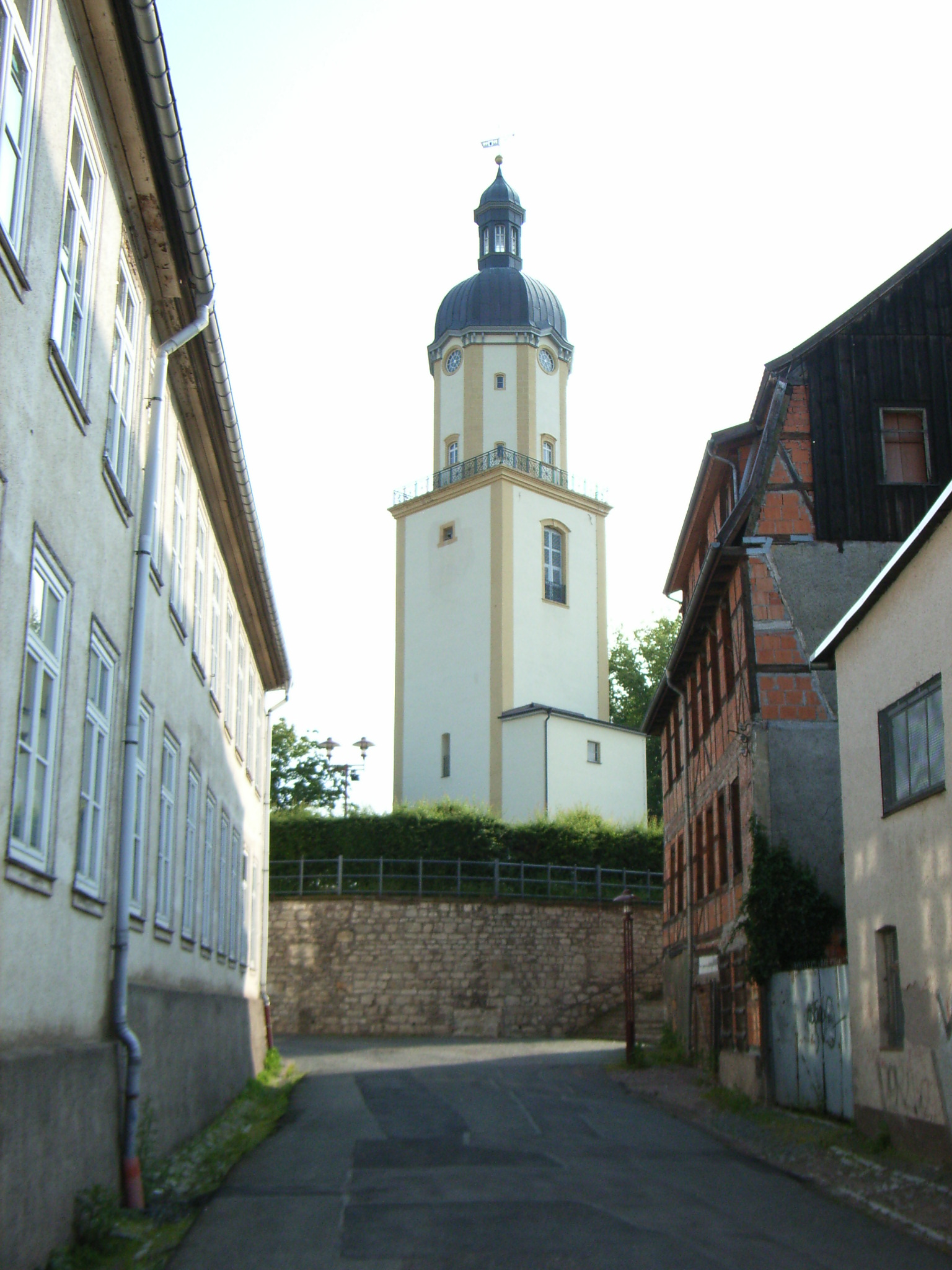
Tower of the St. Michaelis Kirche

=== World wars ===
The nearby Truppenübungsplatz Ohrdruf (military training area) served as a POW camp during World War I, housing around 20,000 prisoners. It was later used by the Wehrmacht and in the fall of 1944 a section of it became the Ohrdruf concentration camp. The prisoners were used to construct a large-scale communications hub underneath the Mühlberg Castle on the northern outskirts of Ohrdruf, consisting of roads, railways and tunnels. The latter were to include a temporary headquarters for the Nazi leadership following the evacuation of Berlin (Führerhauptquartier).

According to German historian Rainer Karlsch, the facility built at nearby Jonastal was one of two locations where Kurt Diebner's team tested its nuclear reactor. During this process, according to Karlsch, prisoners of war were killed by a crude nuclear weapon under the supervision of the SS.

Ohrdruf is believed to be the place where the historical Compiègne Wagon was blown up in an air attack in 1944. Ohrdruf was the first Nazi concentration camp to be liberated by the US Army, on 4 April 1945. Shortly thereafter, Generals Eisenhower, Patton and Bradley came here to look at the piles of dead bodies left behind by the SS.

=== Post World War II ===
The military training area of Truppenübungsplatz Ohrdruf was taken over in July 1945 by the Red Army, since Thuringia became part of the Soviet occupation zone. The Nordlager -part of the concentration camp was razed. Two memorials to the dead were erected at around this time. In 1991, ownership was transferred to the German Defence Ministry. Since 1993, the Bundeswehr has been in charge of the area.

The Soviet troops also used Schloss Ehrenstein from 1956 until 1971, leaving it in a desolate condition.

In 1993, the German confectionery company August Storck opened a logistics centre and a cocoa processing plant, where the Knoppers, Merci and Werther's Original brand products are manufactured, in northwest Ohrdruf. The site employed 1,500 people in 2016, rising to 2,400 people in 2026.

== Sights ==
- Schloss Ehrenstein: A Renaissance castle with Baroque alterations, the restoration of Schloss Ehrenstein was completed in the fall of 2013 and a new exhibition on local history opened in the east wing. However, on 26 November 2013 a fire destroyed parts of the castle and many of the new exhibits. It was started inadvertently by workmen putting finishing touches to the south eastern corner of the castle. Sparks caused a smouldering fire that spread unnoticed. Despite the efforts of hundreds of fire fighters from all over the region, supported by Bundeswehr and Technisches Hilfswerk, large parts could not be saved. Small fires were still burning five days later. The town library and museum were severely damaged.
- St. Michaelis Kirche: Previous churches at the site go back to the 8th century. Associated with the Bach family, who worked there as organists, the church burned down in 1753 and 1808 when fires raged through the town, but was rebuilt each time. The church was again destroyed by Allied bombing in 1945, only the roofless 15th-century tower remaining. This was covered by a concrete roof until 1998/99 when the tower was reconstructed. Today, the tower houses a small chapel and an exhibition on the church's history.

== See also ==
- List of towns in Thuringia
- Ohrdruf concentration camp
