= David Cohen (soldier) =

United States Army soldier (1917–2020)

- Born: December 11, 1917; Brooklyn, New York, US
- Died: April 10, 2020 (aged 102); Longmeadow, Massachusetts, US
- Occupations: Soldier and schoolteacher
- Known for: a liberator of the Ohrdruf concentration camp in Nazi Germany in World War II
- Children: 2 daughters

David Cohen (December 11, 1917 – April 10, 2020) was a soldier in the United States Army and a schoolteacher. In World War II, Cohen was a radio operator in the 4th Armored Division, and present at its liberation of the Ohrdruf concentration camp in Nazi Germany.

== Early life ==
Cohen was born in Brooklyn, New York, and was Jewish. His parents Samuel Cohen and Eva (Blackman) Cohen were Jewish immigrants from Latvia.

== World War II ==
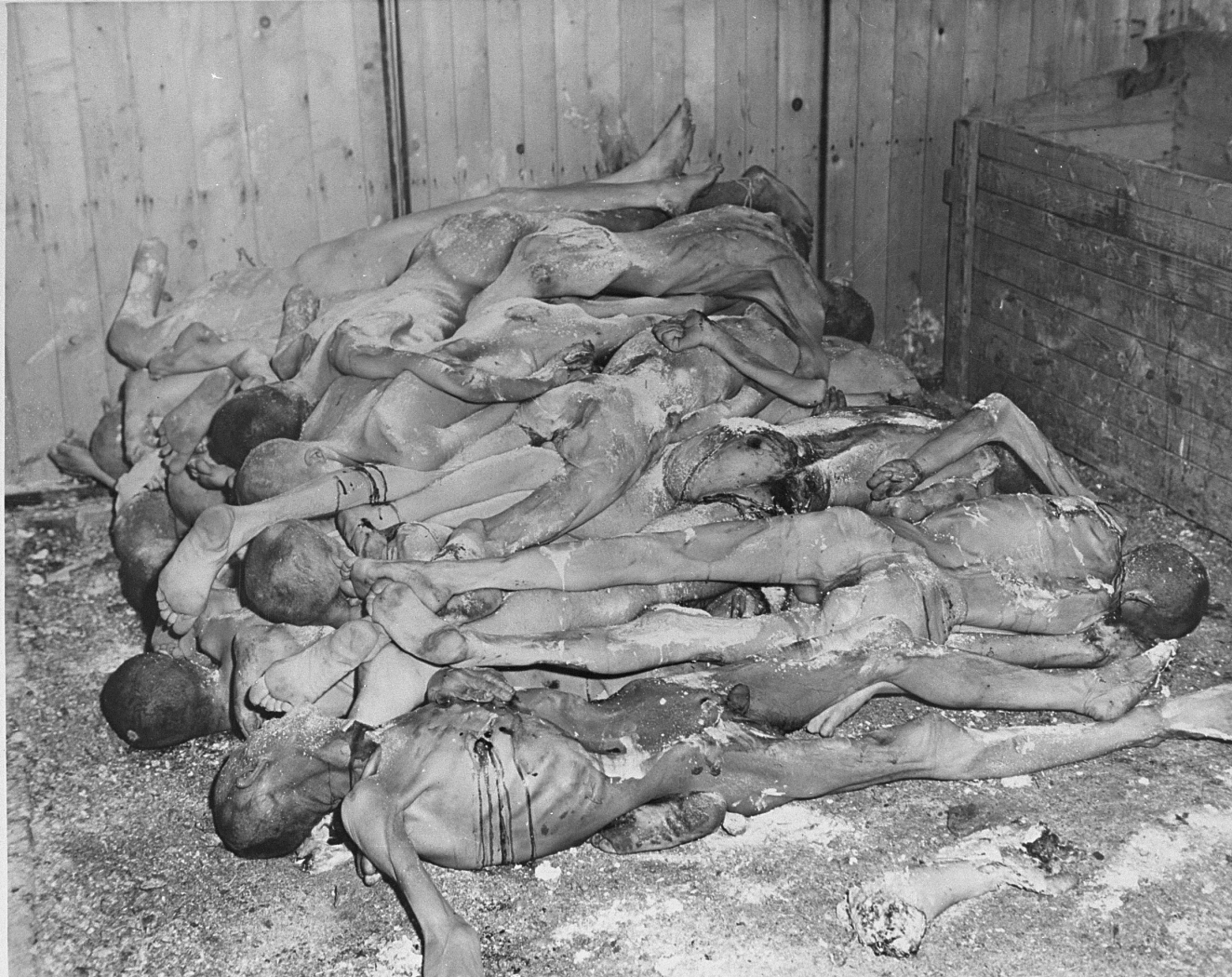
Ohrdruf concentration camp; bodies of prisoners lie stacked in a shed in the camp.

Cohen fought in World War II in France, Belgium, and Nazi Germany as a soldier of the 4th Armored Division, for whom he was a radio operator. He then entered the Ohrdruf concentration camp outside Gotha, Germany, in April 1945, as one of its liberators. At Ohrdruf concentration camp, he said: "We walked into a shed and the bodies were piled up like wood. There are no words to describe it." He said the smell was overpowering and unforgettable. He then helped liberate Buchenwald concentration camp, where the Nazi concentration camp commandant's wife, Ilse Koch, painted on a 'canvas' made of human skin. She also collected tattoos from prisoners skin.

His photography during the liberation and an oral history interview with him are displayed in the permanent collection at the United States Holocaust Museum in Washington, DC, and serve as a permanent documentation of the atrocities of the Holocaust. He spoke about his experiences during the war many times in classrooms as a speaker and educator.

== Post-war life ==
After his service in World War II, Cohen returned to the United States, moved to Queens, New York, and taught history in junior high school in South Jamaica, Queens, for many years. He married his wife, Muriel (née Brown), in the summer of 1942 and raised two daughters, and they had six grandchildren and eight great-grandchildren. They later moved to Longmeadow, Massachusetts.

On April 10, 2020, Cohen (102 years old) and his wife (97 years old), who had met in 1942 in Brooklyn, died on the same day after 78 years of marriage at the Longmeadow Jewish Nursing Home in Longmeadow, Massachusetts, from COVID-19.
