= Gräfenhain =

- Ortsteil of Ohrdruf
- Coat of arms
- Interactive map of Gräfenhain
- Location within Germany Location within Thuringia
- Coordinates: 50°49′11″N 10°42′7″E
- Country: Germany
- State: Thuringia
- District: Gotha
- Town: Ohrdruf

Area
  - Total: 19.38 km^{2} (7.48 sq mi)
- Elevation: 420 m (1,380 ft)

Population (2018-12-31)
  - Total: 1,399
  - Density: 72.19/km^{2} (187.0/sq mi)
- Time zone: UTC+01:00 (CET)
  - Summer (DST): UTC+02:00 (CEST)
- Postal codes: 99887
- Dialling codes: 03624
- Vehicle registration: GTH

Gräfenhain (German pronunciation: [ˈɡʁɛːfn̩ˌhaɪn]) is a village and a former municipality in the district of Gotha, Thuringia, Germany. Since 1 January 2019, it is part of the town Ohrdruf.
