= Ohrdruf Priory =

Monastery in Ohrdruf, Germany

Ohrdruf Priory or Karmel St. Elija, Ohrdruf, is a Carmelite monastery at Ohrdruf in Thuringia, Germany. It is the latest in a series of religious foundations in the town:

== First foundation ==
A Benedictine cell dedicated to Saint Michael was established here by Saint Boniface in 724–726 (also the date of foundation of the settlement) which seems to have had a school attached. It was given with its lands by Saint Lull (d. 786) to Hersfeld Abbey, and apparently did not survive as a Benedictine community beyond the end of the century. It is nevertheless of importance as the first monastery founded in Thuringia.

== Second foundation ==
In 777 Saint Lullus established the parish church of Saint Peter. When this was re-founded in 980, a community of canons seems also to have been established, which later followed the Augustinian rule; they were still subordinate to Hersfeld Abbey. The monastery at Ohrdruf was the centre of spiritual authority for the region of south-west Thuringia until the middle of the 14th century, but in 1344 was transferred to Gotha.

== Third foundation ==
In 1463 the former premises of the canons were occupied by Carmelite friars, who were dispossessed at the Reformation, when the monastery was suppressed and the buildings largely demolished. The remainder was converted into a residence for the Counts of Gleichen, at that time the owners of Ohrdruf, called "Schloss Ehrenstein", after their ancestral castle. This building is now the town museum, archive and cultural centre.

== Fourth foundation ==
In 1991 a second Carmelite monastery, the Karmel St. Elija, was set up here in a new building dedicated on 15 October, the feast of the Carmelite Saint Teresa of Avila.
