= Harm G. Schroeter =

German historian and economist

Harm G. Schröter (Schroeter) is a German professor of economic history at the University of Bergen, Norway.

== Background ==
After studying history, geography, and pedagogy, Schröter received his PhD in 1981 from the Department of History at the University of Hamburg and, in 1992, his Habilitation from the Department of Economics at the Free University of Berlin. Since then he has taught history and economics at universities in Germany, Norway, and the United States.

== Work ==
Schröter's main goal has been to understand Europe's specific economic profile and character during the last two centuries. Consequently, he has explored: the relationship between the state and the economy; economic cooperation (cartels, cooperatives, cooperation between capital and labour, etc.); European multinationals; technological innovation; the (dis-) advantages of small but developed European states; institutions and innovation; the "European enterprise"; and the Americanization of Europe's economic behaviour and values.

Schröter has served as President of the European Business History Association and on various advisory and editorial boards.

== Selected bibliography ==
- Schröter, Harm G., Americanization of the European Economy: A compact survey of American economic influence in Europe since the 1880s (Dordrecht: Springer, 2005)
- Schröter, Harm G., Geschichte Skandinaviens (C. H. Beck: München, 2007)
- Schröter, Harm G. (ed.), The European Enterprise: Historical investigation into a future species (Berlin & Heidelberg: Springer, 2008)
- Schröter, Harm G. (ed.), Americanization in Europe in the Twentieth Century, special edition of European Review of History, Vol. 15, No. 4, 2009, ISSN 1350-7486
- Battilani, Patrizia and Schröter, Harm G. (ed.), The Cooperative Business Movement, 1950 to the Present (Cambridge: Cambridge University Press, 2012)
- Clifton, Judith and Lanthier, Pierre and Schröter, Harm G. (eds.), The Economic and Social Regulation of Public Utilities: An International History, (Routledge: London, 2012)
- Barjot, Dominique and Schröter, Harm G., Economic cooperation reconsidered, Special edition of Revue Économique, 2013, vol. 64, No. 6
- Barjot, Dominique and Schröter, Harm G., La circulation de l’information et des connaissances, special edition of Entreprises et Histoire, 2014, vol. 75
- Schröter, Harm G.; et al. (2018). "Les voies multiples du développement en Asie". Enterprises et Histoire (90): 114–137. doi:10.3917/eh.090.0114.

For a more comprehensive list, consult Schröter's site.
