= Michaeliskirche (Ohrdruf) =

Church in Germany

Michaeliskirche (St. Michaelis Kirche)
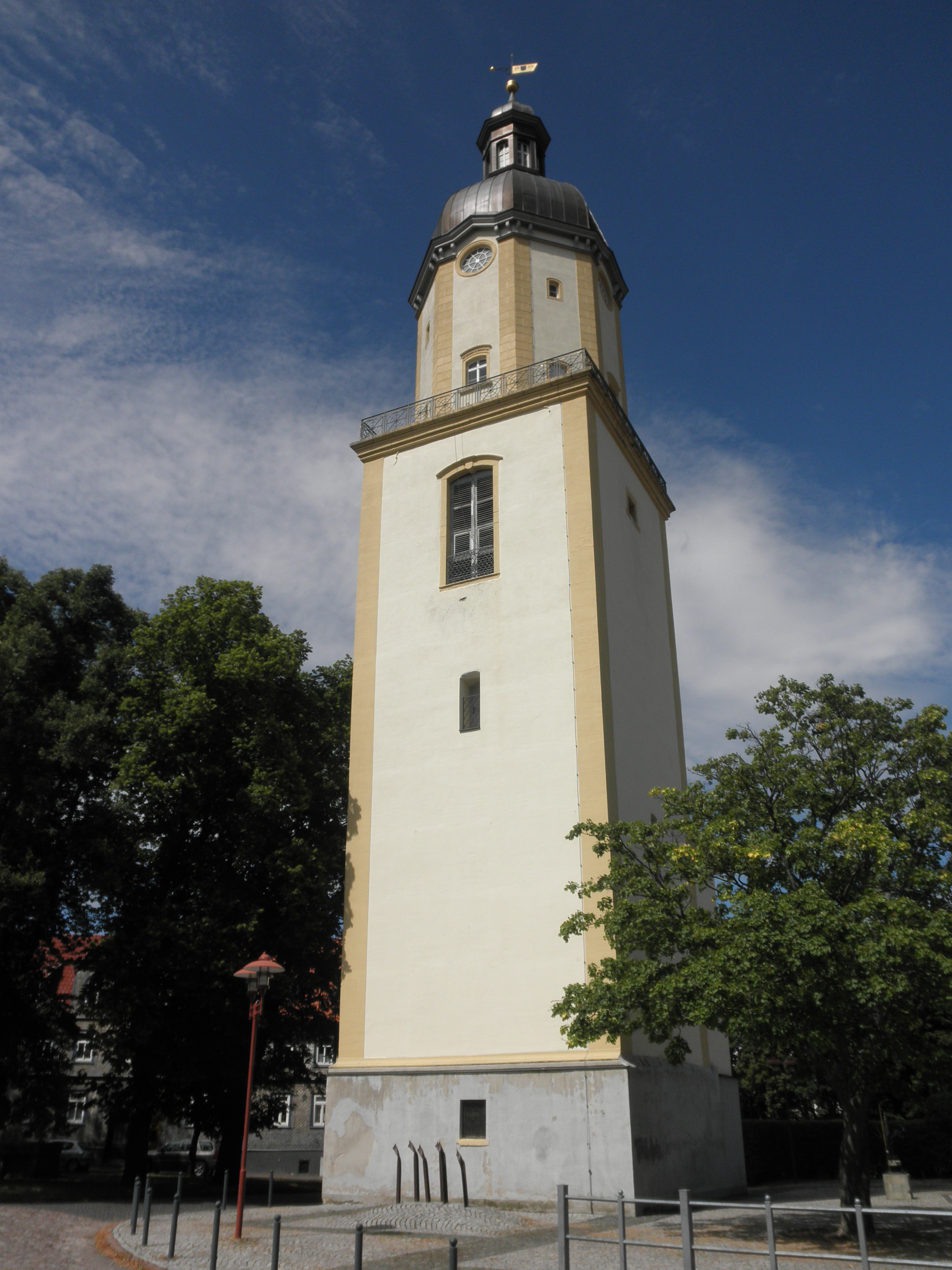
- Tower of Michaeliskirche

- Location within Germany

Religion
- Affiliation: Protestant (Evangelisch-Lutherische Kirchgemeinde Ohrdruf)
- District: Gotha
- Province: Thuringia

Location
- Municipality: Ohrdruf
- State: Germany
- Coordinates: 50.8285°N 10.7347°E

The Michaeliskirche or St. Michaelis Kirche (St. Michael's Church) in the Thuringian town of Ohrdruf was the church where Johann Sebastian Bach's eldest brother, Johann Christoph Bach, held the post of organist 1690 - 1721. He took on the care of his younger brothers Johann Jacob and Johann Sebastian after they were orphaned in 1695.

== History ==
Previous churches at the site go back to the 8th century and are associated with Saint Boniface who reportedly founded the first monastery in Thuringia here, dedicated to Saint Michael.

J. S. Bach was orphaned at the age of 9 and went to live with his eldest brother. Johann Sebastian also attended school here.

The church contained a three-manual German baroque organ in a historic case of Austrian origin. It was here that Bach learned about organ building. The organ needed constant repairs, and he was sent into the organ often to fix minor problems.

The church burned down in 1753 and 1808 when fires raged through the town, but rebuilt each time. The church was again destroyed by Allied bombing in 1945, only the roofless 15th-century tower remained. This was covered by a concrete roof until 1998/99 when the tower was reconstructed. Today, the tower houses a small chapel and an exhibition on the church's history.
