= Association of Business Historians =

The Association of Business Historians is a British learned society focused on business history and the history of companies, concerned with "the study of all aspects of the historical development of enterprise, businesses and business activity generally and their inter-relationship with the social, cultural, economic and political environment."

In 2009 it was one of The National Archives' partners in the production of a National Strategy for Business Archives (England and Wales) (2009).

== Activities ==
The association organises an annual conference and an annual Tony Slaven Doctoral Workshop, named for Tony Slaven, one of the association's founders. It awards the annual Coleman Prize, named for business historian D. C. Coleman, for a recent Ph.D. thesis in the area of business history, and the Tony Slaven Grant.

== History ==
The Association of Business Historians was founded in 1990 to promote the study of business history, following on from the activities of the Business Archives Council, established in 1934.

The first meeting to establish a British organisation for business history took place on 27 September 1989, in the new premises of the Centre for Business History in Glasgow. A pre-committee was formed at the meeting to develop a constitution, plan elections and launch a new association, consisting of Tony Slaven, Geoff Jones, Terry Gourvish, Derek Oddy and Oliver Westall.

The objective of the Association of Business Historians was "to promote the study, teaching and publication of all aspects of the history of business and industry, and of the environment in which they operate." The first elections were held in September 1990, and the first council was formed of Derek Oddy (President), Geoff Jones (Vice President), Tony Slaven (Secretary Treasurer), Terry Gourvish (Newsletter Editor), Mary Rose (Membership Secretary) and David Jeremy as Council Member.

The first conference took place on 27–28 September 1991 at the Centre for Business History in Scotland, exactly two years after the first meeting, and became a biennial series of meetings until 2000.

The association's Ph.D. prize was introduced in 1997 at the joint British/American conference held in Glasgow. In 2000 the prize became annual and was named the Coleman Prize. Each year the prize winner joins the council to ensure that new researchers become embedded in the networks and practices of the association.

The Association of British Historians also had an early influence on the formation of the European Business History Association. Discussions began in 1993 between Geoff Jones, Tony Slaven and Hans Pohl, and were extended to include Mary Rose, Keetie Sluytermann, Rolv Petter Amdam and Per Boje at a meeting in Glasgow in the autumn of 1993. A series of meetings followed in Bonn, Rotterdam and Reading. The EBHA was formally launched at the business history conference in Rotterdam in October 1994, with its inaugural conference following in Gothenburg in August 1996.
