= Rolf Sennewald =

German weightlifter (1937–2025)

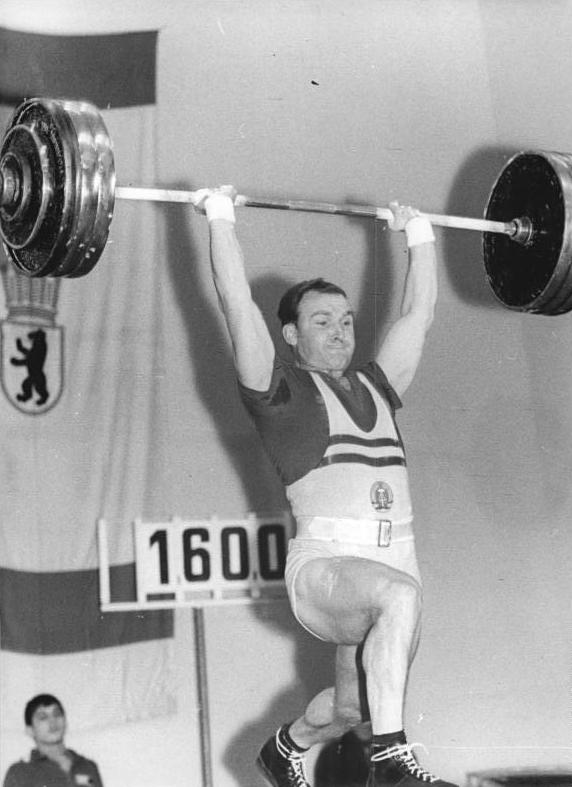
- Rolf Sennewald in 1965

Personal information
- Born: 4 April 1937 Crawinkel, Germany
- Died: 1 February 2025 (aged 87)
- Height: 1.70 m (5 ft 7 in)
- Weight: 85 kg (187 lb)

Sport
- Sport: Weightlifting
- Club: ASG Vorwärts Leipzig

Rolf Sennewald (4 April 1937 – 1 February 2025) was a German weightlifter. He competed in the light-heavyweight category at the 1960 Summer Olympics and shared 11th place.

Sennewald died on 1 February 2025, at the age of 87.
