= Rolv Petter Amdam =

Norwegian economic historian

- Born: 7 February 1953 (age 73); Ørskog Municipality, Norway
- Education: University of Oslo
- Known for: International Business
- Scientific career
- Fields: Business History, Business Education
- Workplaces: BI Norwegian Business School

Rolv Petter Storvik Amdam (born 7 February 1953) is a Norwegian economic historian.

He was born in Ørskog Municipality. During his young days he was a member of the Workers' Communist Party. He graduated from the University of Oslo with a cand.mag. degree in 1981, took the cand.philol. degree in 1985 and took the dr.philos. degree in 1998. In 1997 he was appointed at the BI Norwegian Business School as a professor of economic history, having been an associate professor since 1991. He is currently a professor emeritus at BI Norwegian Business School. He has also been a guest scholar at the University of Reading, the University of Toulouse, the École supérieure des sciences économiques et commercials, the Nanyang Technological University and the ISM University of Management and Economics.

From 2002 to 2004 he chaired the Norwegian Historical Association.

Books include the histories of the companies Nycomed, NKS Fjernundervisning, Christiania Glassmagasin as well as BI Norwegian Business School. He has published 29 articles in international academic journals.
