= Hitlers Bombe =

2005 book by Rainer Karlsch

- First edition
- Author: Rainer Karlsch
- Language: German
- Genre: Non-fiction
- Publisher: DVA (DE) (2005); Lannoo (NL) (2005); dtv (DE) (2007); Waxmann (DE) (2007); Calmann-Lévy (FR) (2007)
- Publication date: March 2005 (DE); November 2005 (NL); June 2007 (DE); October 2007 (DE); October 2007 (FR)
- Publication place: Germany
- Pages: 415 (DE, 2005, DVA); 336 (NL, 2005); 464 (DE, 2007, dtv); 352 (DE, 2007, Waxmann); 528 (FR, 2007)
- ISBN: 978-3-42105-809-6

Hitlers Bombe (Hitler's Bomb) is a nonfiction book by the German historian Rainer Karlsch published in March 2005, which claims to have evidence concerning the development and testing of a possible "nuclear weapon" by Nazi Germany in 1945. The "weapon" in question is not alleged to be a standard nuclear weapon powered by nuclear fission, but something closer to either a radiological weapon (a so-called "dirty bomb") or a hybrid-nuclear fusion weapon. Its new evidence is concerned primarily with the parts of the German nuclear energy project under Kurt Diebner.

In the years since publication, physicists and nuclear historians have refuted many of Karlsch's key claims and noted that no traces of significant radioactivity have been found at the proposed test sites.

== Summary ==
Under supervision of the SS, from 1944 to 1945, German scientists in Thuringia tested some form of "nuclear weapon", possibly a dirty bomb (for the differences between this and a standard fission weapon, see nuclear weapon design). Several hundred prisoners of war are alleged to have died as a result. Karlsch's primary evidence are alleged vouchers for the atomic weapon attempts, a preliminary plutonium bomb patent from the year 1941 (which had been known about, but not yet found), and industrial archaeology conducted on the remains of the first experimental German nuclear reactor.

== Follow-up research ==
In February 2006, full tests on the soil at the proposed test site were released by the Physikalisch-Technische Bundesanstalt (PTB), revealing no abnormal background levels of radiation after taking into account the already elevated background levels as a result of the Chernobyl accident in 1986. The PTB release emphasized that while it could not necessarily rule out a German test conclusively, that soil analysis of that site revealed absolutely no evidence of it.

Further nuclear physics research has found that the mechanisms detailed for how this bomb may have functioned are not capable of producing the described result. Additionally, historical analysis has found no evidence that enriched uranium was produced in the quantities necessary to conduct any of these hypothesised experiments.

== Reception ==
Writing in Berliner Zeitung, physicist Michael Schaaf, another author on the same subject, recognized the historical value of Hitlers Bombe but criticized the work for "a catastrophic lack of understanding of physics".

== See also ==
- German nuclear weapons program
