= Elsteraue =

- Municipality
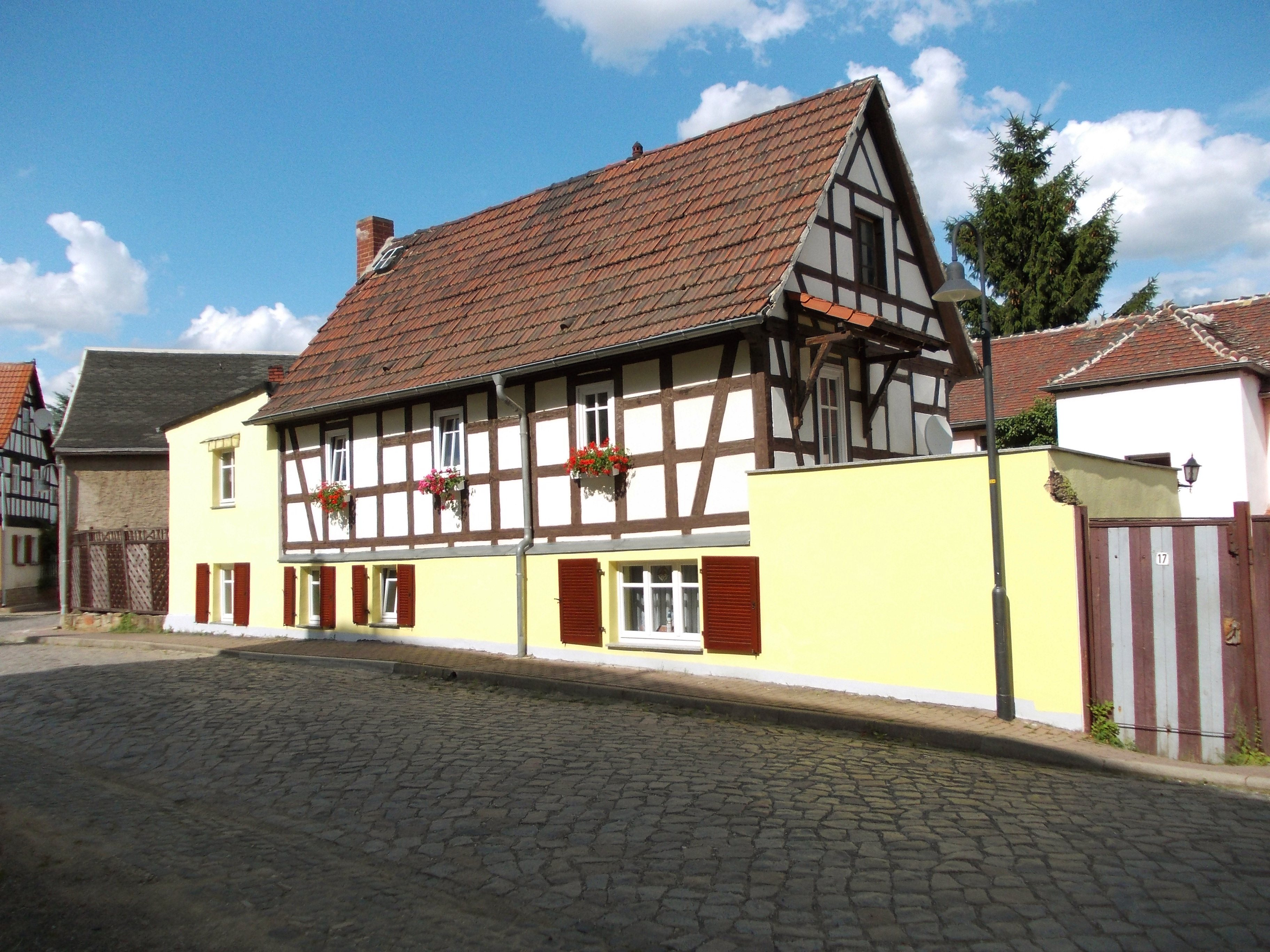
- Timber-framed houses in Elsteraue

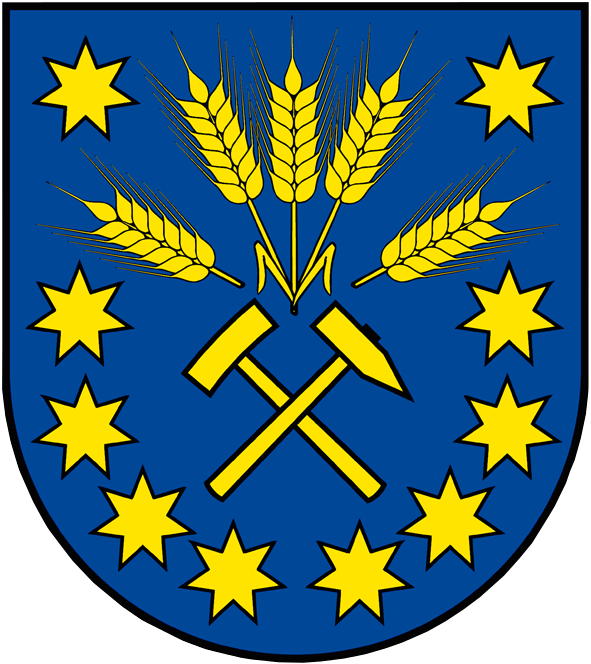
- Coat of arms

- Location of Elsteraue within Burgenlandkreis district
- Interactive map of Elsteraue
- Location within Germany Location within Saxony-Anhalt
- Coordinates: 51°4′30″N 12°13′5″E
- Country: Germany
- State: Saxony-Anhalt
- District: Burgenlandkreis

Government
  - Mayor (2017–24): Andreas Buchheim

Area
  - Total: 79.91 km^{2} (30.85 sq mi)
- Elevation: 145 m (476 ft)

Population (2025-12-31)
  - Total: 7,676
  - Density: 96.06/km^{2} (248.8/sq mi)
- Time zone: UTC+01:00 (CET)
  - Summer (DST): UTC+02:00 (CEST)
- Postal codes: 06712, 06724, 06725, 06729
- Dialling codes: 034424, 03441
- Vehicle registration: BLK
- Website: www.gemeinde-elsteraue.de

Elsteraue is a municipality in the Burgenlandkreis district in Saxony-Anhalt, in eastern Germany. It is situated near the White Elster river, about 30 km (20 mi) southwest of Leipzig.

== Districts ==
It is divided into many municipal districts:

- Bornitz
- Draschwitz
- Göbitz (Göbitz, Maßnitz, Torna)
- Könderitz (Könderitz, Etzoldshain, Minkwitz, Traupitz)
- Langendorf (Langendorf, Döbitzschen, Staschwitz)
- Profen (Profen, Beersdorf, Lützkewitz)
- Rehmsdorf (Rehmsdorf, Krimmitzschen, Sprossen)
- Reuden (Reuden, Predel, Ostrau)
- Spora (Spora, Nißma, Oelsen, Prehlitz-Penkwitz)
- Tröglitz (Tröglitz, Alt-Tröglitz, Kadischen, Burtschütz, Stocksdorf, Gleina, Techwitz)

== History ==
During World War II, the present-day district of Tröglitz was the location of a subcamp of the Buchenwald concentration camp, and some 8,600 prisoners, mostly Jews, passed through it. The prisoners were subjected to forced labour, poor food rations, and harassment by the SS, and over 850 died there, while other exhausted prisoners were sent back to Buchenwald, and many were then sent to the Auschwitz concentration camp and murdered there. Among the prisoners Imre Kertész, Hungarian author and recipient of the 2002 Nobel Prize in Literature. In April 1945, the camp was evacuated, with some 3,000 surviving prisoners sent by train towards German-occupied Czechoslovakia, and at least 380 prisoners massacred by the SS and German civilians during the transport, in Reitzenhain on the pre-war Czechoslovak-German border.
