= Rainer Karlsch =

German historian and author (born 1957)

- Born: 3 April 1957 (age 69); Stendal
- Awards: Stinnes Foundation prize (1996)

Academic background
- Education: Humboldt University of Berlin
- Thesis: Probleme der Neuererbewegung in der Industrie der DDR in den fünfziger und sechziger Jahren – dargestellt am Beispiel der Einführung sowjetischer Neuerermethoden (1986)

Academic work
- Discipline: Contemporary history
- Institutions: Humboldt University of Berlin (1986–1991, 1995–2000); Historical Commission for Berlin (1992–1994); Free University of Berlin (2000–2001); Institut für Angewandte Demographie (2001–2004); Institute of Contemporary History (Munich) (2017–2021)
- Notable works: Hitlers Bombe (2005)

Rainer Karlsch (born 3 April 1957) is a German economic historian and author.

== Biography ==
Karlsch was born in Stendal. He studied economic history at the Humboldt University of Berlin and graduated in 1986 with a doctorate in Economics.

Until 1991, he taught economic and social history at his alma mater. From 1992 to 1994, he was an assistant at the Historical Commission for Berlin. During the 1990s, he helped the Max Planck Society reclaim the Kaiser Wilhelm Institute of Physics documentation relating to the Nazi German nuclear programme that had been removed to the Soviet Union after World War II. From 1995 to 1998, he was an assistant to a key DFG program. He was affiliated with the Humboldt University of Berlin again between 1995 and 2000. From 2000 to 2001 he was employed by the Institute for Economic Policy and Economic History (Institut für Wirtschaftspolitik und Wirtschaftsgeschichte) of the Free University of Berlin. He then worked for the Institute for Applied Demography (Institut für Angewandte Demographie) in Berlin until 2004.

Since 2004, he has been an independent researcher working in the area of economic and business history, based in Berlin. From 2017 to 2021, he held a position at the Berlin branch of the Institute of Contemporary History (Munich).

== Research ==
Karlsch investigated the four-year history of Nazi German atomic research through a collaboration with the TV journalist Heiko Petermann. They were supported by international historians, physicists and radiochemists.

In 2005, he published his controversial book Hitlers Bombe, in which he presented evidence that Nazi scientists working under Kurt Diebner experimented inconclusively with a large atomic reactor during the final stages of World War II and may have tested a crude nuclear weapon in Thuringia on 3 March 1945, killing several hundred prisoners of war and concentration camp inmates. The results of the research, along with an additional unpublished document from the Russian state archives, were then summarised by Karlsch and a US historian of Nazi science, Mark Walker, in Physics World. As Walker explained in 2024, the documentary and oral evidence had led Karlsch to conclude that the nuclear weapon tested was not an atomic bomb, but "a hybrid fission/fusion device using hollow-point technology". The Nazi German attempts to provoke nuclear fusion through hollow-point explosions (thus bypassing nuclear reaction based on enriched uranium) are known to have been unsuccessful.

The characterisation of the weapon developed by the Nazis towards the end of the war was contested. A number of other historians active in the field – Dieter Hoffmann, Paul Lawrence Rose, Bernhard Fulda, and Michael Schaaf – have played down the significance of the details uncovered by Karlsch and disputed that it was possible to speak of a Nazi nuclear test or a Nazi atom bomb. While accusing Karlsch of "a catastrophic lack of understanding of physics", Schaaf nonetheless conceded that Karlsch had shown "German research into uranium went further than we'd thought". Karlsch himself admitted that the developed weapons might better be characterised as atomic "grenades", and Walker wrote that it was not clear whether the tested device could be called a "nuclear weapon", but they insisted that the matter was not settled and more research was required. Karlsch's argumentation was pursued further by the historian Günter Nagel, whose 2002 work Atomversuche in Deutschland. Geheime Uranarbeiten in Gottow, Oranienburg und Stadtilm had been based on an exchange of results with Karlsch, in his book Das geheime deutsche Uranprojekt 1939–1945 (2016), and by the physicist Heinz Dieter Haupt in his book Deutschlands Weg zur Bombe (2022).

== Awards ==
In 1996, Karlsch won the first prize from the Stinnes Foundation for his 1993 book Allein bezahlt? on the handling of war reparations in the Soviet-occupied zone of Germany.

== Scientific works ==
=== Authored ===
- Allein bezahlt? Die Reparationsleistungen der SBZ/DDR 1945–53, Berlin: Christoph Links, 1993, ISBN 3-86153-054-6; reprint: Elbe-Dnepr Verlag 2004 ISBN 3-933395-51-8
- The Chemistry Must Be Right: The Privatization of Buna Sow Leuna Olefinverbund GmbH (with Raymond G. Stokes), Berlin: Edition Leipzig, 2001
- Urangeheimnisse: Das Erzgebirge im Brennpunkt der Weltpolitik 1933–1960 (with Zbyněk Zeman), Berlin: Christoph Links, 2002, ISBN 978-3-86153-276-7
  - English translation: Uranium Matters: Central European Uranium in International Politics, 1900–1960, Budapest: CEU Press, 2008
- Faktor Öl. Die Mineralölwirtschaft in Deutschland 1859–1974 (with Raymond G. Stokes), München: C. H. Beck, 2003, ISBN 3-406-50276-8
- Hitlers Bombe. Die geheime Geschichte der deutschen Kernwaffenversuche, München: Deutsche Verlags-Anstalt, 2005, ISBN 3-421-05809-1
- Wirtschaftsgeschichte Sachsens im Industriezeitalter (with Michael Schäfer), Leipzig: Edition Leipzig, 2006, ISBN 9783361005983
- Uran für Moskau. Die Wismut, eine populäre Geschichte, Bonn: Bundeszentrale für politische Bildung, 2007, ISBN 9783893317912
- Vom Licht zur Wärme. Geschichte der ostdeutschen Gaswirtschaft 1855–2008, Berlin: Nicolai, 2008, ISBN 9783894794903
- Playing the Game: The History of Adidas (with Christian Kleinschmidt, Jorg Lesczenski, Anne Sudrow), Munich: Siedler, 2018, ISBN 9783791358307
- Familienunternehmen in Ostdeutschland. Niedergang und Neuanfang von 1945 bis heute, 2nd edn., Halle: Mitteldeutscher Verlag, 2023, ISBN 9783963117145
- Treibstoff für den Weltkrieg. Die Deutsche Erdöl AG, 1933–1945 (with Manfred Grieger), Frankfurt: Societäts-Verlag 2024, ISBN 9783955425111
- Das Chemiedreieck bleibt! Die Privatisierung der ostdeutschen Chemie- und Mineralölindustrie in den 1990er-Jahren, Berlin: Christoph Links, 2024, ISBN 9783962892159

=== Edited ===
- Strahlende Vergangenheit. Studien zur Geschichte des Uranbergbaus der Wismut (with Harm Schröter), St. Katharinen: Scripta Mercaturae, 1996, ISBN 3895900303
- Sowjetische Demontagen in Deutschland 1944–1949. Hintergründe, Ziele und Wirkungen (with Jochen Laufer; Zeitgeschichtliche Forschungen, 17), Berlin: Duncker & Humblot 2002, ISBN 3-428-10739-X
- Für und wider "Hitlers Bombe". Studien zur Atomforschung in Deutschland (with Heiko Petermann), Münster: Waxmann, 2007, ISBN 9783830918936
- Uranbergbau im Kalten Krieg. Die Wismut im sowjetischen Atomkomplex (with Rudolf Boch), 2 vols., Berlin: Christoph Links, 2011, ISBN 9783861536536
- Studien zur Geschichte der Filmfabrik Wolfen und der IG Farbenindustrie AG in Mitteldeutschland (with Helmut Maier), Essen: Klartext, 2014, ISBN 9783837508406
