= Crawinkel =

- Ortsteil of Ohrdruf
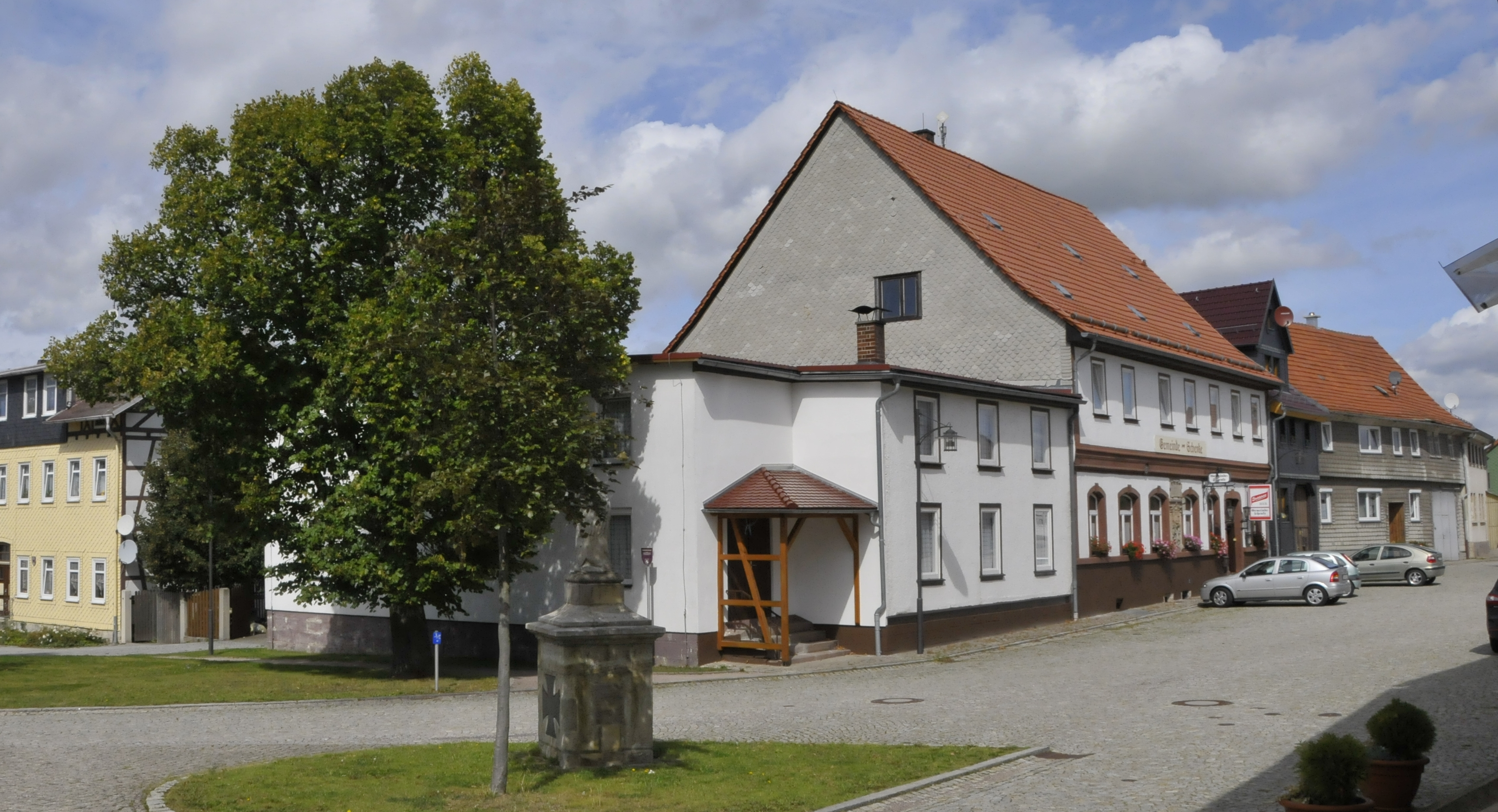
- Market square

- Coat of arms
- Interactive map of Crawinkel
- Location within Germany Location within Thuringia
- Coordinates: 50°47′N 10°47′E
- Country: Germany
- State: Thuringia
- District: Gotha
- Town: Ohrdruf

Area
  - Total: 25.23 km^{2} (9.74 sq mi)
- Elevation: 469 m (1,539 ft)

Population (2017-12-31)
  - Total: 1,446
  - Density: 57.31/km^{2} (148.4/sq mi)
- Time zone: UTC+01:00 (CET)
  - Summer (DST): UTC+02:00 (CEST)
- Postal codes: 99330
- Dialling codes: 03624
- Website: www.crawinkel.de

Crawinkel (German pronunciation: [ˈkʁaːvɪŋkl̩]) is a village and a former municipality in the district of Gotha, Thuringia, Germany. Since 1 January 2019, it is part of the town of Ohrdruf. Crawinkel was first mentioned in 1088.

After the Armistice with France in 1940, during World War II, German forces took numerous memorials from the Glade of the Armistice in the forest of Compiègne, where the Armistice with Germany that ended World War I was also signed, as prizes to Crawinkel. These included the actual railway carriage where both armistices were concluded. In 1945, the car was dynamited and its pieces buried. Since German reunification in 1989, numerous artifacts have been recovered and returned to France.

The Crawinkel concentration camp, a satellite camp attached to the Ohrdruf subcamp of Buchenwald, was opened in 1944. 30,000 inmates worked on railway tunnels and in a quarry.

== People ==
- Rolf Sennewald (1937–2025), weightlifter
