= Ohrdruf concentration camp =

Nazi concentration camp in Thuringia, Germany (1944–45)

Ohrdruf
- Concentration camp
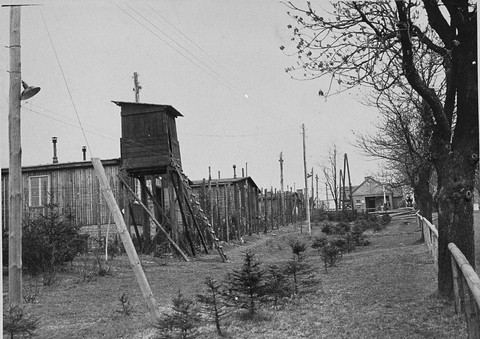
- View of the camp including a watchtower, barracks, and barbed wire fencing

- Location of Ohrdruf in Germany
- Coordinates: 50°50′1″N 10°45′17″E
- Location: Thuringia, Germany
- Operated by: German Army, later Schutzstaffel (SS)
- Original use: Prisoner of war camp
- Operational: 1944–1945
- Number of gas chambers: none
- Liberated by: US Army, April 4, 1945

Ohrdruf was a German forced labor and concentration camp located near Ohrdruf, south of Gotha, in Thuringia, Germany. It was part of the Buchenwald concentration camp network.

== Operation ==
Created in November 1944 near the town of Ohrdruf, south of Gotha, in Thuringia, Germany, Ohrdruf was initially a separate forced labour camp directly controlled by the SS Main Economic and Administrative Office (SS-WVHA) but then became a subcamp of the Buchenwald concentration camp near Weimar. It made use of huts originally built in 1940 for Wehrmacht troops using the Truppenübungsplatz nearby as well as other facilities. The camp, code-named Außenlager S III, consisted of a northern and a southern camp; later, a tent camp at Espenfeld and a camp at Crawinkel were added. The camp supplied forced labor in the form of concentration camp prisoners for a planned railway construction project for an immense communications center inside the basement of the Mühlberg castle in Ohrdruf. Inmates had to work to connect the castle to the main railroad line and to dig tunnels in the nearby mountains, which would be used as emergency shelter for the train that contained the "Führerhauptquartier". The proposed communication centre was never completed due to the rapid American advance.

By late 1944, around 10,000 prisoners were housed here; through March 1945, the total number sent here was around 20,000, mainly Russians, Poles, Hungarian Jews, some French, Czechs, Italians, Belgians, Greeks, Yugoslavians and Germans. Conditions were atrocious: in the huts there were no beds, "only blood-covered straw and lice". Despite the season, not all prisoners were housed in huts—some were accommodated in stables, tents and old bunkers. Work days were initially 10 to 11 hours long, then later 14 hours, involving strenuous physical labor building roads, railways and tunnels. In addition, inmates had to cope with long marches and musterings, total lack of sanitary equipment and medical facilities, and insufficient food and clothing.

In January 1945, the SS guards were reinforced by units from Auschwitz. Towards the end of the war, the prisoners were used to construct a subterranean headquarters for the government (Führerhauptquartier) to be used following a possible evacuation of Berlin. It was never completed. A site near Ohrdruf code-named 'Olga' was designated as quarters for the Army High Command (OKH) during the final stages of the war and some elements of the OKH did move there in late February 1945.

It is still not clear exactly what projects the prisoners of Ohrdruf were working on. Besides the temporary quarters for the Reich leadership, the extensive tunneling and other works at Jonastal point to an armament factory of some kind. There is a theory, advanced by Rainer Karlsch that the facility was intended as (and used as) a testing site for a German nuclear bomb. Other possibilities are an improved V-2 rocket or long-range jet-powered bombers, but all of this is speculative.

Those unable to work were moved by the SS to Sterbelager: 4,300 sick inmates were moved to Bergen-Belsen, or the Kleines Lager at Buchenwald. In late March 1945, the camp had a prisoner population of some 11,700 to 13,000. As the American troops advanced towards Ohrdruf, the SS began evacuating almost all prisoners on death marches to Buchenwald on April 1. During these marches, SS, Volkssturm, and members of the Hitler Youth killed an estimated 1,000 prisoners. Mass graves were re-opened and SS men tried to burn the corpses. The SS guards killed many of the remaining prisoners in the Nordlager that were deemed too ill to walk to the railcars. After luring them to the parade ground, claiming that they were to be fed, the SS shot them and left their corpses lying in the open.

In addition to those killed on the death marches, an estimated 3,000 inmates died from exhaustion or were murdered inside the camp. Together with those worked to death here but moved elsewhere to die, estimates of the total number of victims are around 7,000.

== Liberation ==
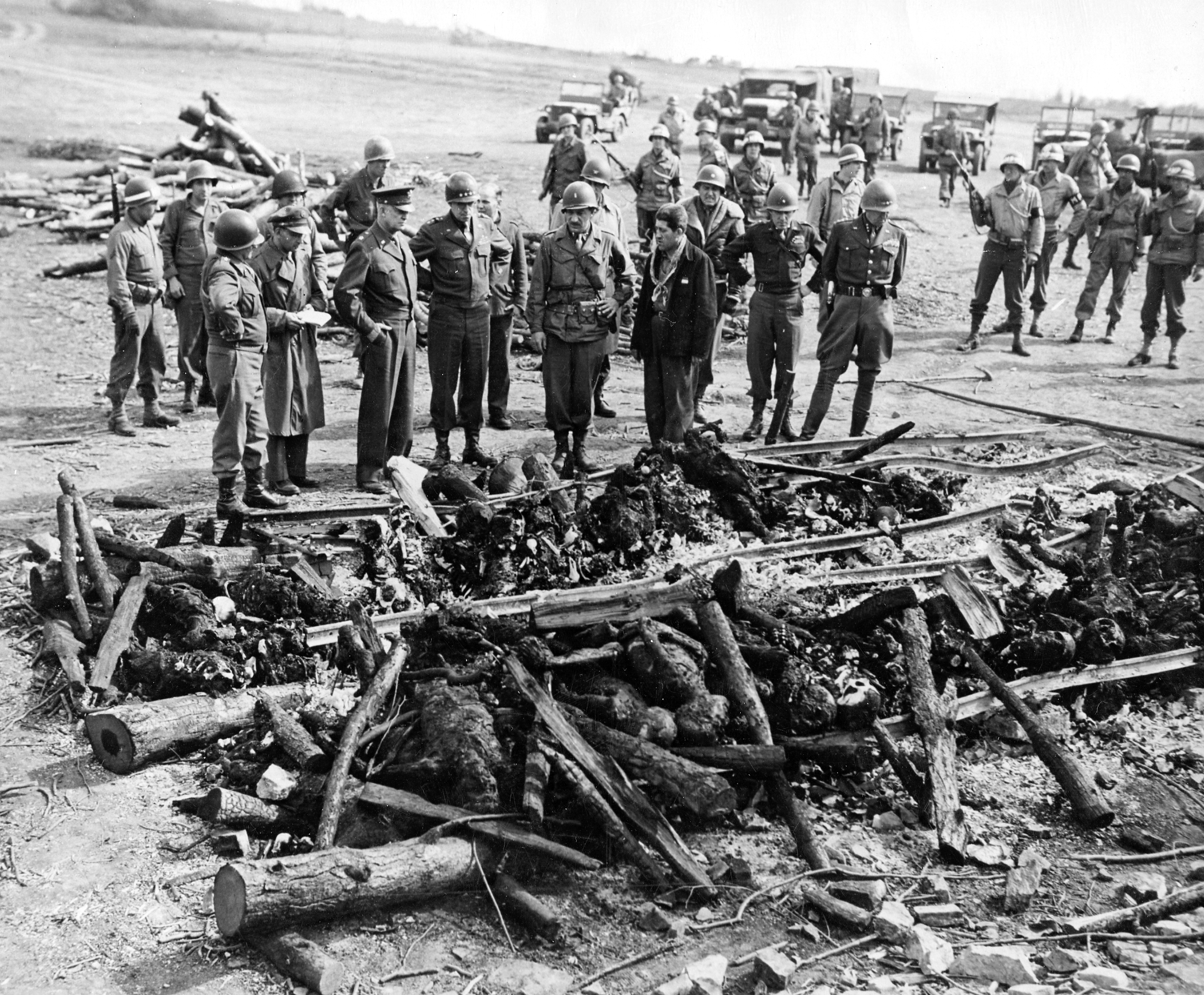
US generals Eisenhower, Bradley, Patton, and Eddy inspect a cremation pyre at the camp on April 12, 1945, after liberation.

Ohrdruf was liberated on April 4, 1945, by the 4th Armored Division, led by Brig. Gen. Joseph F. H. Cutrona, and the 89th Infantry Division commanded by Maj. Gen. Thomas D. Finley. It was the first Nazi concentration camp liberated by the U.S. Army.

When the soldiers of the 4th Armored Division entered the camp, they discovered piles of bodies, some covered with lime, and others partially incinerated on pyres. The ghastly nature of their discovery led General Dwight D. Eisenhower, Supreme Commander of the Allied Forces in Europe, to visit the camp on April 12, with Generals George S. Patton and Omar Bradley. After his visit, Eisenhower cabled General George C. Marshall, the head of the Joint Chiefs of Staff in Washington, describing his trip to Ohrdruf:

... the most interesting—although horrible—sight that I encountered during the trip was a visit to a German internment camp near Gotha. The things I saw beggar description. While I was touring the camp I encountered three men who had been inmates and by one ruse or another had made their escape. I interviewed them through an interpreter. The visual evidence and the verbal testimony of starvation, cruelty and bestiality were so overpowering as to leave me a bit sick. In one room, where there were piled up twenty or thirty naked men, killed by starvation, George Patton would not even enter. He said that he would get sick if he did so. I made the visit deliberately, in order to be in a position to give first-hand evidence of these things if ever, in the future, there develops a tendency to charge these allegations merely to 'propaganda.'

At Ohrdruf concentration camp, 4th Armored Division soldier David Cohen said: "We walked into a shed and the bodies were piled up like wood. There are no words to describe it." He said the smell was overpowering and unforgettable.

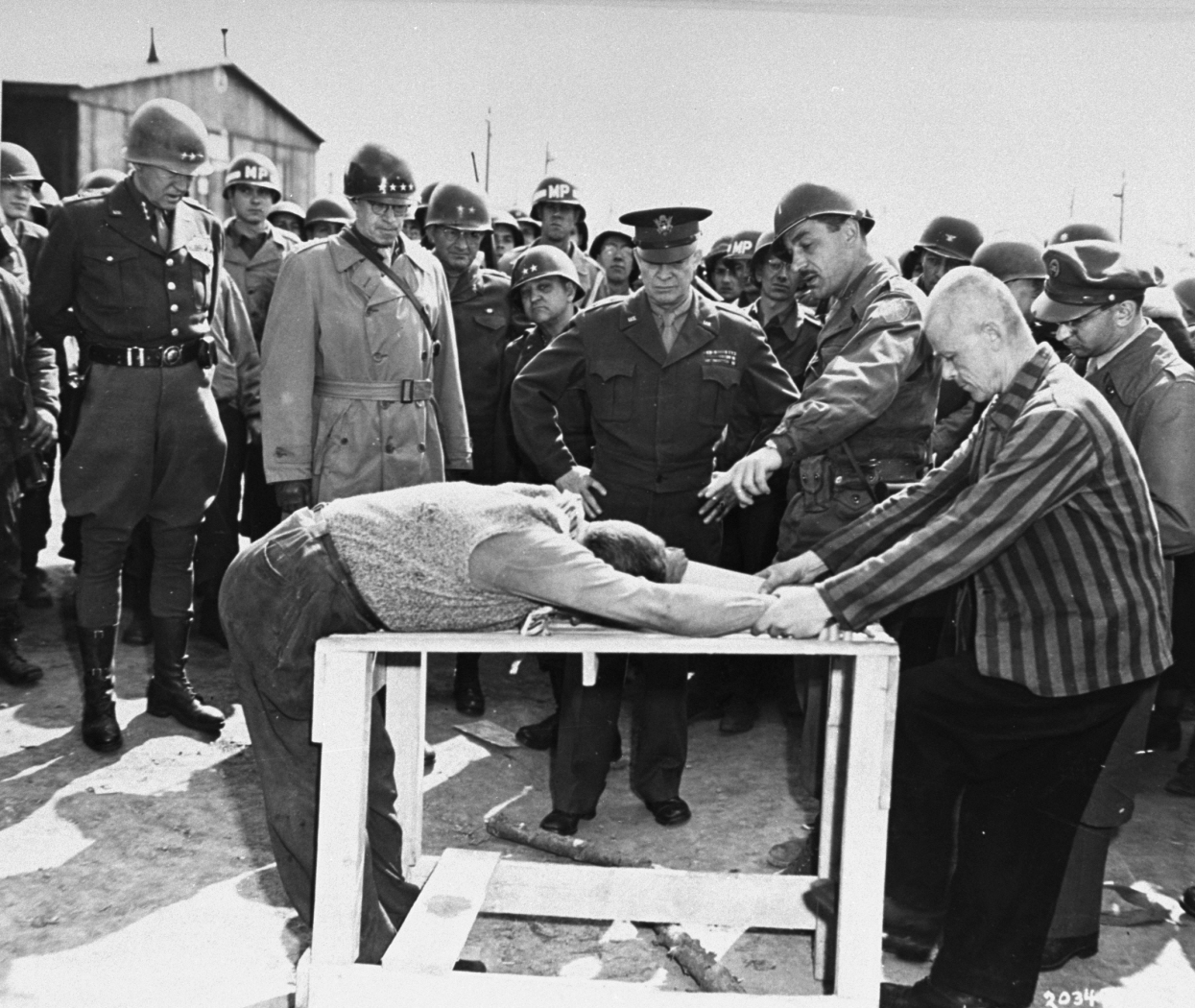
Survivors of the Ohrdruf concentration camp demonstrate torture methods used in the camp.

Seeing the Nazi crimes committed at Ohrdruf made a powerful impact on Eisenhower, and he wanted the world to know what happened in the concentration camps. On April 19, 1945, he again cabled Marshall with a request to bring members of Congress and journalists to the newly liberated camps so that they could bring the horrible truth about German Nazi atrocities to the American public. That same day, Marshall received permission from the Secretary of War, Henry Lewis Stimson, and President Harry S. Truman for these delegations to visit the liberated camps.

Ohrdruf had also made a powerful impression on Patton, who described it as "one of the most appalling sights that I have ever seen." He recounted in his diary that:

In a shed ... was a pile of about 40 completely naked human bodies in the last stages of emaciation. These bodies were lightly sprinkled with lime, not for the purposes of destroying them, but for the purpose of removing the stench.

When the shed was full—I presume its capacity to be about 200, the bodies were taken to a pit a mile from the camp where they were buried. The inmates claimed that 3,000 men, who had been either shot in the head or who had died of starvation, had been so buried since the 1st of January.

When we began to approach with our troops, the Germans thought it expedient to remove the evidence of their crime. Therefore, they had some of the slaves exhume the bodies and place them on a mammoth griddle composed of 60-centimeter railway tracks laid on brick foundations. They poured pitch on the bodies and then built a fire of pinewood and coal under them. They were not very successful in their operations because there was a pile of human bones, skulls, charred torsos on or under the griddle which must have accounted for many hundreds.

== Later use ==
The military training area of Truppenübungsplatz Ohrdruf was then taken over in July 1945 by the Red Army, since Thuringia became part of the Soviet occupation zone. The Nordlager was razed. Two memorials to the dead were erected at around this time. Since 1993, the Bundeswehr has been in charge of the area.

Today, the only structures remaining from the camp period are some of the munition bunkers that were also used to house prisoners.

== Gallery of Ohrdruf after liberation ==
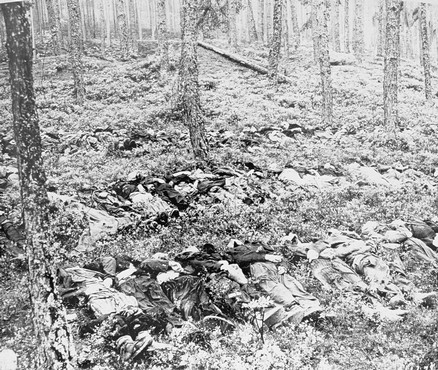
The bodies of prisoners executed by the SS prior to the evacuation are laid out in a wooded area near the Ohrdruf concentration camp. 6 april 1945

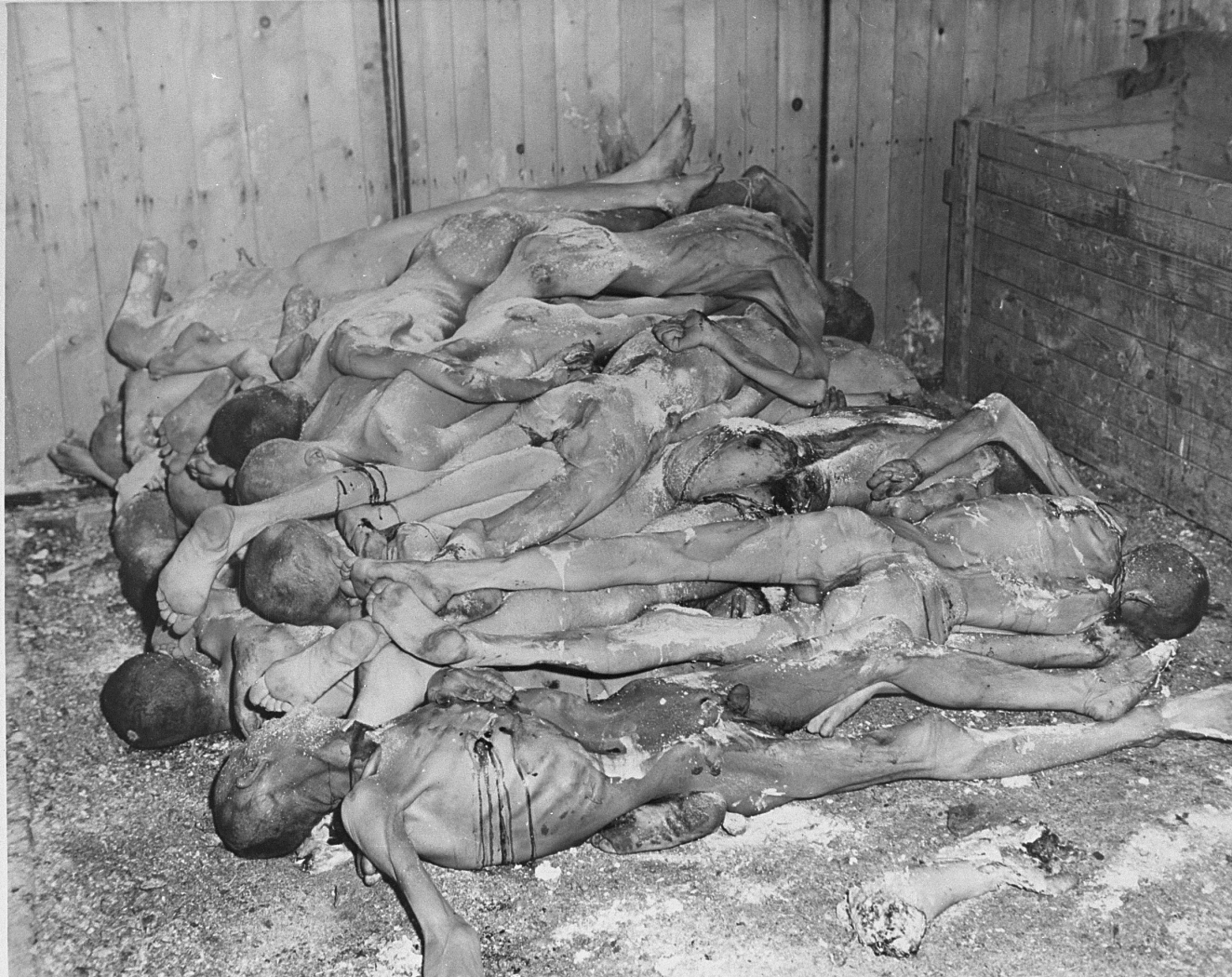
The bodies of prisoners lie stacked in a shed.

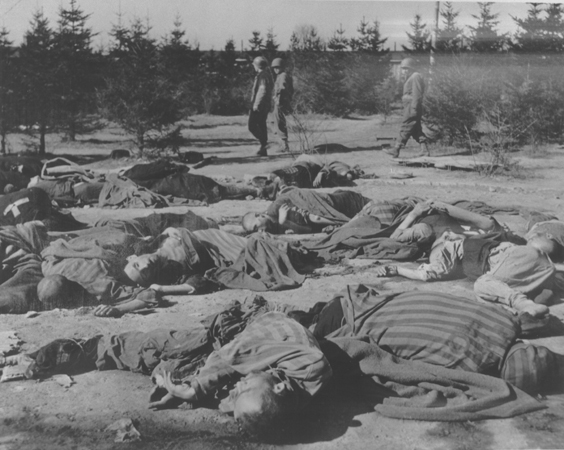
American soldiers walk past the bodies of prisoners killed during evacuation.

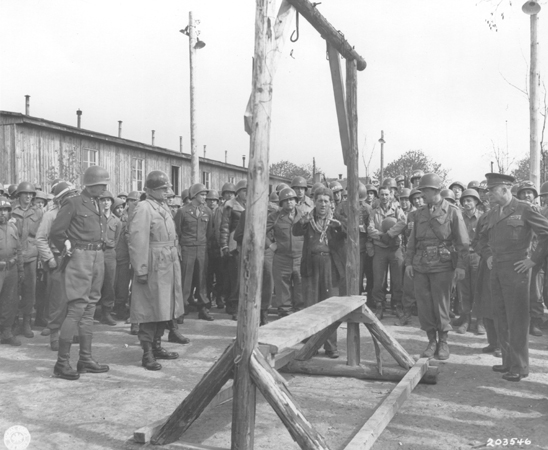
An Austrian-Jewish survivor points out the gallows to General Dwight D. Eisenhower.

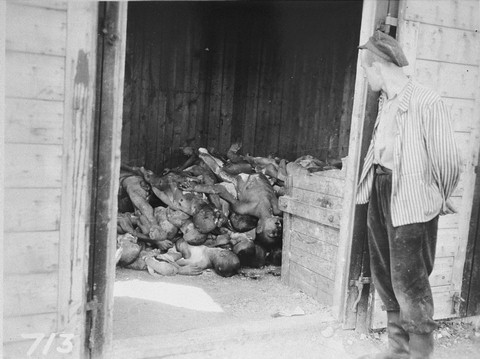
A survivor views a pile of bodies stacked in a shed.

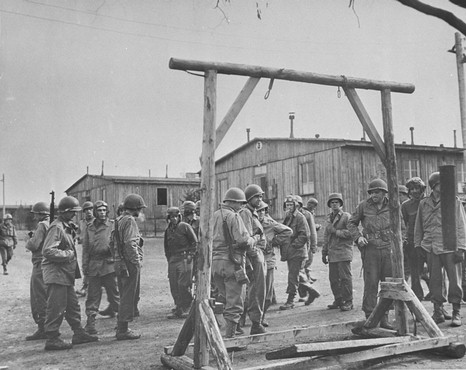
American soldiers view a gallows.

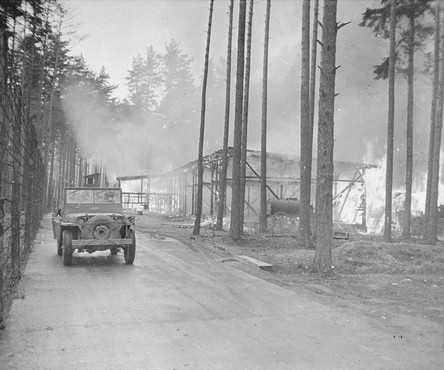
An American soldier drives past buildings set afire by survivors.

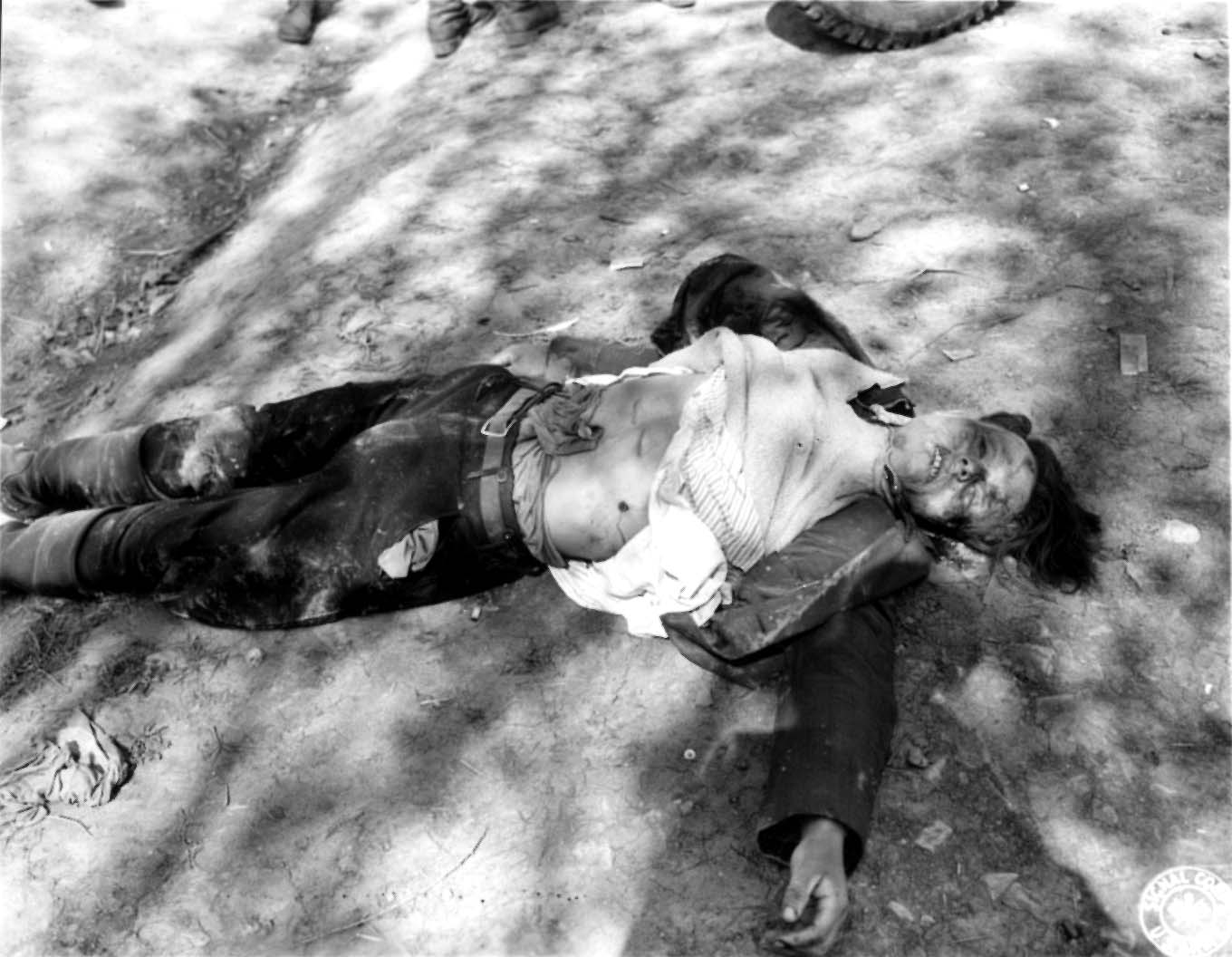
Dead German female guard from the Ohrdruf Concentration Camp. She was killed either by the U.S. troops or by the prisoners.

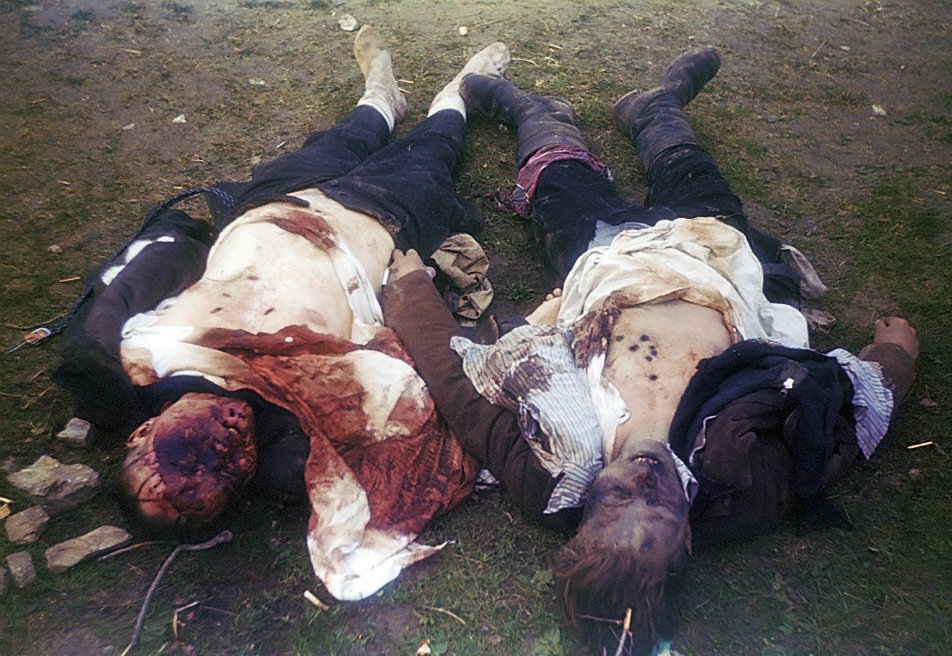
Bodies of two SS guards who were killed in the Ohrdruf concentration camp soon after the liberation.

== Media coverage ==
- Frontline: "Memory of the Camps" (May 7, 1985, Season 3, Episode 18), is a 56-minute television documentary that addresses Ohrdruf and other Nazi concentration camps
- In 2015 the first reports of the systematic genocide was the subject of the short documentary Ralph Rush: Concentration Camp Liberator directed by Daniel L. Bernardi with the collaboration of El Dorado Films and the Veteran Documentary Corps.
