= Secondary education in the United States =

Last six years of statutory formal education before higher level education

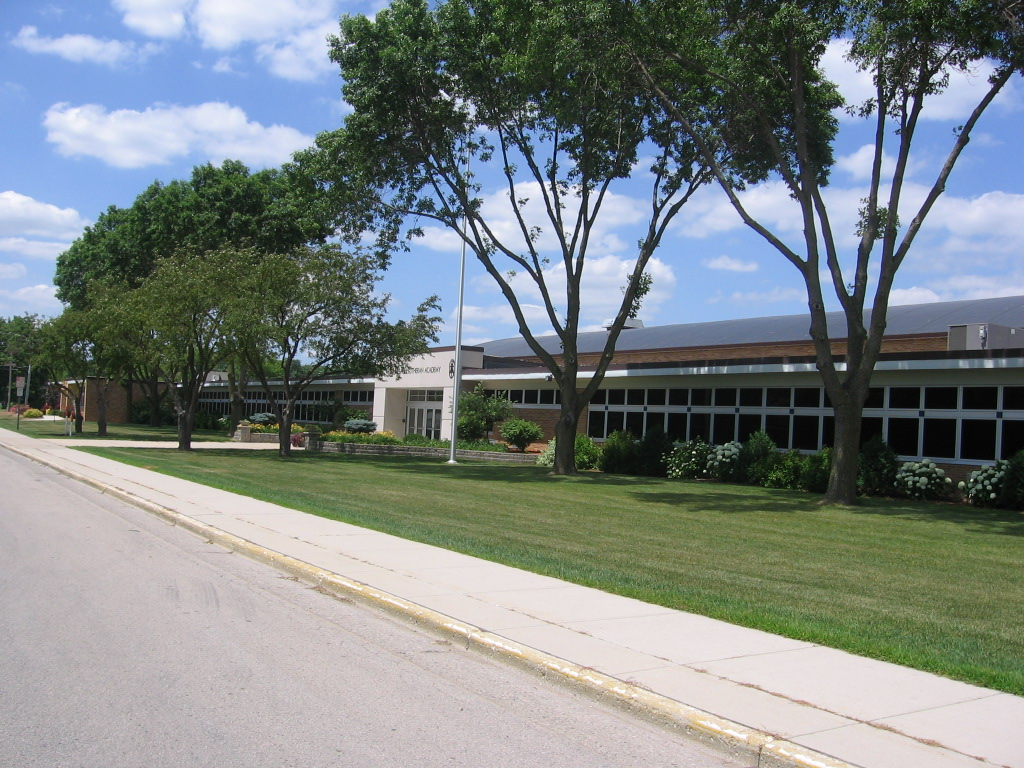
Winnebago Lutheran Academy, a private, Lutheran high school in Fond du Lac, Wisconsin

Secondary education is the last six or seven years of statutory formal education in the United States. It reaches the climax with twelfth grade (age 17–18). Whether it begins with sixth grade (age 11–12) or seventh grade (age 12–13) varies by state and sometimes by school district.

Secondary education in the United States occurs in two phases. The first, as classified by the International Standard Classification of Education (ISCED), is the lower secondary phase, either called a middle school or junior high school. A middle school is for students sixth grade, seventh grade and eighth grade and a junior high school is only for students in seventh and eighth grade.

The second is the ISCED upper secondary phase, a high school or senior high school for students ninth grade through twelfth grade. There is some debate over the optimum age of transfer, and variation in some states; also, middle school often includes grades that are almost always considered primary school.

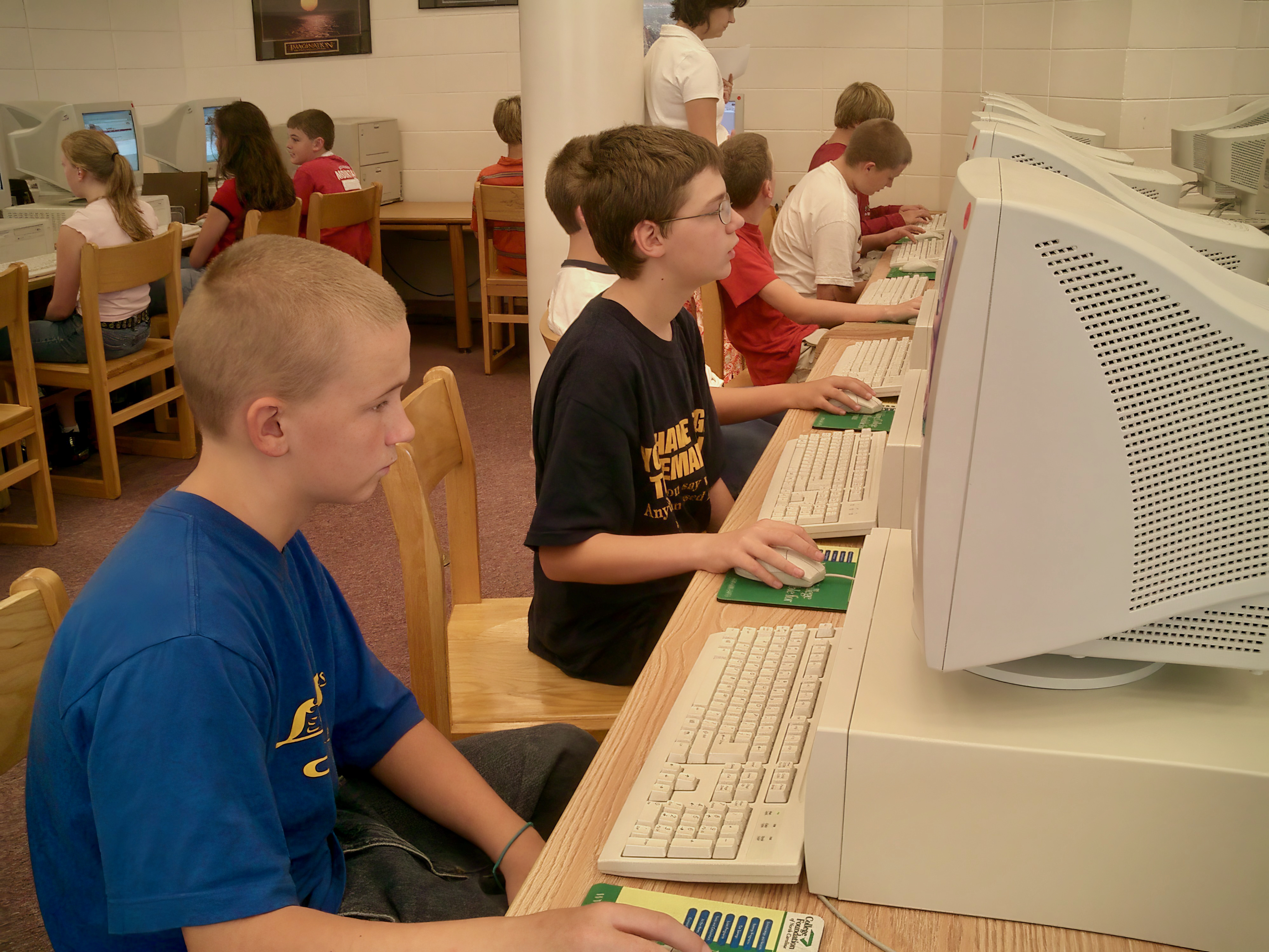
Public middle school students in a school media center in North Carolina

== History ==
=== Academies ===
Today "academy" is a general term referring to post-secondary education, especially the most elite or liberal arts part of it. However, in the 18th and 19th century, an "academy" was what later became known as a high school. In most towns there were no public schools above the primary level. The typical college at first included a preparatory unit, which it dropped by 1900.

In the nineteenth century an academy was what later became known as a high school; in most places in the U.S. there were no public schools above the primary level. Some older high schools, such as Corning Free Academy, retained the term in their names (Corning Free Academy, demoted to a middle school, closed in 2014). In 1753, Benjamin Franklin established the academy and Charitable School of the Province of Pennsylvania. In 1755, it was renamed the college and Academy and Charitable School of Philadelphia. Today, it is known as the University of Pennsylvania. The United States Military Academy was formed in 1802 as a college. It never included a preparatory unit.

The religious revival known as the Second Great Awakening stimulated Protestant denominations to open academies and colleges. In the small town of Amherst, Massachusetts, in 1812, funds were raised for a secondary school, Amherst Academy; it opened December 1814. The academy incorporated in 1816, and eventually counted among its students Emily Dickinson, Sylvester Graham, and Mary Lyon (founder of Mount Holyoke College). By 1821 it added a higher education with Amherst College. Besides religion, the academy movement arose from a public sense that education in the classic disciplines needed to be extended into the western states.

Thousands of academies were started using local funds and tuition; most closed after a few years and others were established. In 1860 there were 6,415 academies in operation. When the Civil War erupted in 1861 they generally closed down temporarily; most in the South never reopened.

Like Amherst, a number of colleges began as (high school) academies, then became a college by adding post-secondary unit, and then finally dropped the pre-collegiate academy. Several colleges were indirectly influenced by the academy model, including Brown University in Rhode Island and Dartmouth College in New Hampshire. In 1753, Benjamin Franklin established the academy and Charitable School of the Province of Pennsylvania. In 1755, it was renamed the college and Academy and Charitable School of Philadelphia. It evolved into the University of Pennsylvania.

By 1840 3,204 academies and similar secondary schools were in operation. Most lasted only a few years but others were created and by 1860 6,415 were in operation nationwide. The first public secondary schools started around the 1830s and 40s within the wealthier areas of similar income levels and greatly expanded after 1865 into the 1890s.

Number of academies and secondary schools in operation, 1840–1860, by region
| Region | 1840 | 1850 | 1860 |
|---|---|---|---|
| New England | 630 | 985 | 988 |
| Middle Atlantic | 861 | 1,626 | 1,648 |
| South Atlantic | 969 | 1,366 | 1,515 |
| Southwest | 560 | 1,371 | 1,361 |
| West | 184 | 550 | 903 |
| Total USA | 3,204 | 5,898 | 6,415 |

=== Public high schools ===
Many high schools in the 19th century contained a "normal school" which trained students as teachers in common schools. Most of those enrolled were young women planning to teach a few years before marriage.

High school enrollment increased when schools at this level became free tuition, and when compulsory education laws required teenagers to attend until a certain age. It was believed that every American student had the opportunity to participate regardless of their ability.

In 1892, in response to many competing academic philosophies being promoted at the time, a working group of educators, known as the "Committee of Ten" was established by the National Education Association. It recommended twelve years of instruction, consisting of eight years of elementary education followed by four years of high school. Rejecting suggestions that high schools should divide students into college-bound and working-trades groups from the start, and in some cases also by race or ethnic background, they unanimously recommended that "every subject which is taught at all in a secondary school should be taught in the same way and to the same extent to every pupil so long as he pursues it, no matter what the probable destination of the pupil may be, or at what point his education is to cease."

=== 20th century ===
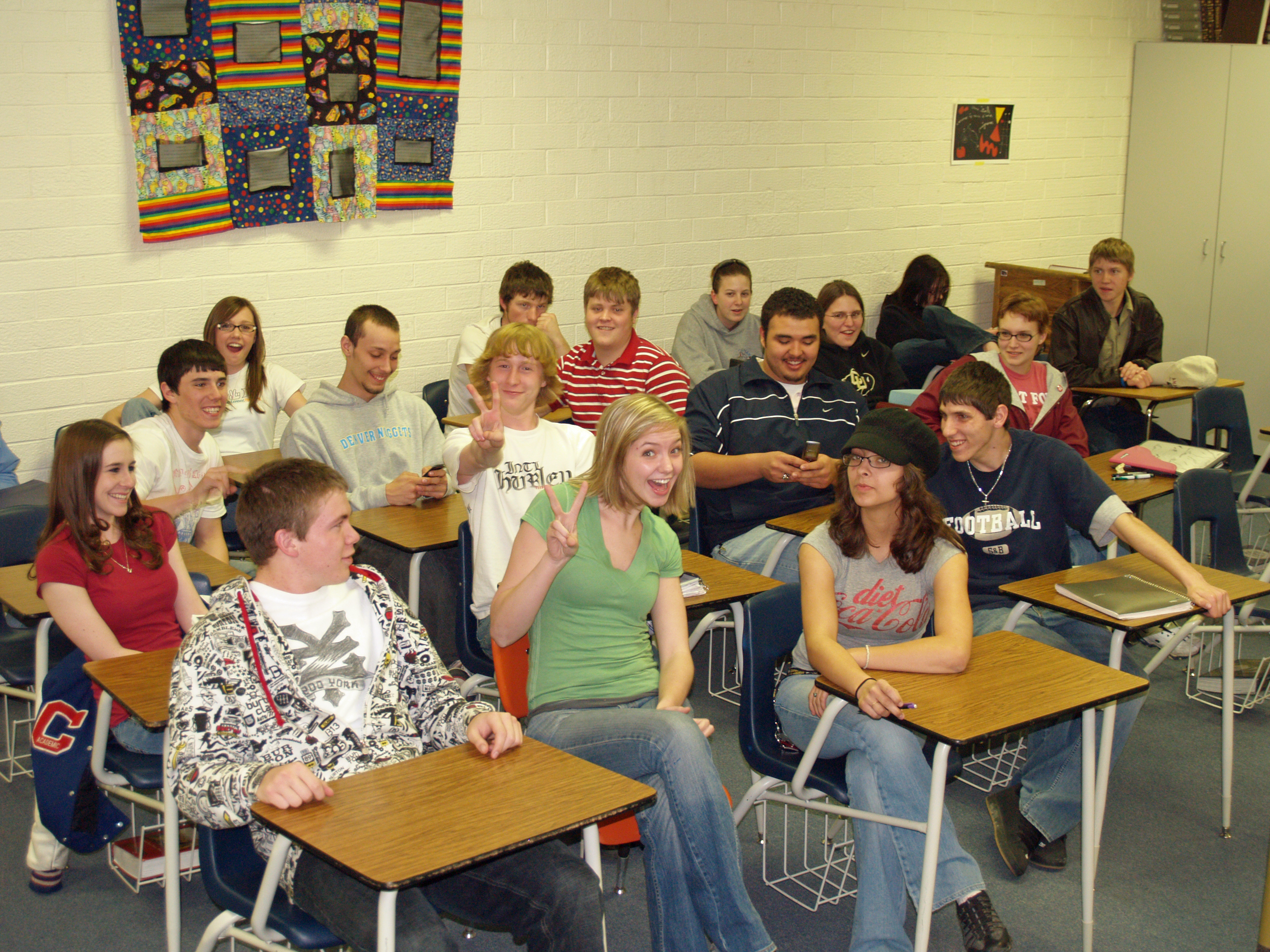
A high school senior (twelfth grade) classroom in Calhan, Colorado

Between 1910 and 1940, the high school movement resulted in rapidly increasing founding of public high schools in many cities and towns and later with further expansions in each locality with the establishment of neighborhood, district, or community high schools in the larger cities which may have had one or two schools since the 19th century. High school enrollment and graduation numbers and rates increased markedly, mainly due to the building of new schools, and a practical curriculum based on gaining skills "for life" rather than "for college". There was a shift towards local decision making by school districts, and a policy of easy and open enrollment. The shift from theoretical to a more practical approach in curriculum also resulted in an increase of skilled blue-collar workers. The open enrollment nature and relatively relaxed standards, such as ease of repeating a grade, also contributed to the boom in secondary schooling. There was an increase in educational attainment, primarily from the grass-roots movement of building and staffing public high schools. By mid-century, comprehensive high schools became common, which were designed to give a free education to any student who chose to stay in school for 12 years to get a diploma with a minimal grade point average.

In 1954, the U.S. Supreme Court case, Brown v. Board of Education, made desegregation of elementary and high schools mandatory, although private Christian schools expanded rapidly following this ruling to accommodate white families attempting to avoid desegregation.

By 1955, the enrollment rates of secondary schools in the United States were around 80%, higher than enrollment rates in most or all European countries. The goal became to minimize the number who exited at the mandatory attendance age, which varies by state between 14 and 18 years of age, and become considered to be dropouts, at risk of economic failure.

In 1965, the far-reaching Elementary and Secondary Education Act ('ESEA'), passed as a part of President Lyndon B. Johnson's War on Poverty, provided funds for primary and secondary education known as Title I funding while explicitly forbidding the establishment of a national curriculum. It emphasized equal access to education and established high standards and accountability. The bill also aimed to shorten the achievement gaps between students by providing every child with fair and equal opportunities to achieve an exceptional education.

After 1980, the growth in educational attainment decreased, which caused the growth of the educated workforce to slow down.

Under the education reform movement started in the early 1990s by many state legislatures and the federal government, about two-thirds of the nation's public high school students are required to pass a graduation exam, usually at the 10th and higher grade levels, though no new states had adopted a new requirement in 2006. This requirement has been an object of controversy when states have started to withhold diplomas, and the right to attend commencement exercises, if a student does not meet the standards set by the state.

Pressure to allow people and organizations to create new Charter schools developed during the 1980s and were embraced by the American Federation of Teachers in 1988. These would be legally and financially autonomous public school free from many state laws and district regulations, and accountable more for student outcomes rather than for processes or inputs. Minnesota was the first state to pass a charter school law in 1991.

In 2001, the No Child Left Behind Act required all public schools receiving federal funding to administer a statewide standardized test annually to all students. Schools that receive Title I funding must make Adequate Yearly Progress (AYP) in test scores; for instance, each year, fifth graders must do better on standardized tests than the previous year's fifth graders. Schools that miss AYP for a second consecutive year are publicly labeled as in need of improvement, and students have the option to transfer to a better school within the school district, if such options exist.

Standards-based education has been embraced in most states which changed the measurement of success to academic achievement, rather than the completion of 12 years of education. By 2006, two-thirds of students lived in states with effective standards requiring passing tests to ensure that all graduates had achieved these standards.

By 2009, charter schools were operating in 41 of the 50 states and the national capital of Washington, D.C., and 59% of these had waiting lists.

== Curriculum ==
Authority to regulate education resides constitutionally with the individual states, with direct authority of the U.S. Congress and the federal U.S. Department of Education being limited to regulation and enforcement of federal constitutional rights. Great indirect authority is, however, exercised through federal funding of national programs and block grants although there is no obligation upon any state to accept these funds. The U.S. government may also propose, but cannot enforce national goals, objectives and standards, which generally lie beyond its jurisdiction.

Many high schools in the United States offer a choice of vocational or college prep curriculum. Schools that offer vocational programs include a very high level of technical specialization, e.g., auto mechanics or carpentry, with a half-day instruction/approved work program in senior year as the purpose of the program is to prepare students for gainful employment without a college degree. The level of specialization allowed varies depending on both the state and district the school is located in.

=== Core ===
Many states require courses in the "core" areas of English (or Language Arts), Science, Social Studies (or History), and Mathematics every year although others allow more choice after 10th grade.

Three science courses, biology, chemistry, and physics are usually offered. Many schools follow the curriculum set by Next Generation Science Standards (NGSS). Other science courses offered at high schools include geology, ecology, astronomy, health, and forensic.

High school math courses typically include Pre-algebra, Algebra I, Geometry, Algebra II with trigonometry classes. Advanced study options can include Precalculus, Calculus, and Statistics.

English and language classes are usually required for four years of high school although many schools count journalism, public speaking/debate, foreign language, literature, drama, and writing (both technical and creative) classes as English/Language classes.

Social studies classes include History, Political Science, Economics and Geography. Political science and Economics classes are sometimes combined as two semesters of a year-long course. Additional study options can include classes in Sociology, and Psychology.

Many states require a health or wellness course in order to graduate. The class typically covers basic anatomy, nutrition, first aid, sexual education, and how to make responsible decisions regarding illegal drugs, tobacco, and alcohol. In some places, contraception is not allowed to be taught for religious reasons. In some places, the health and physical education class are combined into one class or are offered in alternate semesters. In some private schools, such as Catholic schools, theology is required before a student graduates. Two years of physical education (usually referred to as "gym", "PE" or "phys ed" by students) is commonly required, although some states and school districts require that all students take Physical Education every term.

Most high schools in the country offer Advanced Placement (AP) or International Baccalaureate (IB) courses to be taken instead of the ones created by the school and/or school district. These classes have a standard curriculum, making them easy to study for, but are more rigorous as they are college level. Students may take these for classes they are more proficient in if they want a challenge. If students earn a good score on the AP Exam, they are given college credit at participating universities.

=== Electives ===
Public high schools offer a wide variety of elective courses, which are classes that do not fall under any of the "core" categories. Students usually choose to take elective classes tailored to their personality, interests, and after school activities. The availability of such courses depends upon each particular school, varying based on what the building can support and if the school can afford to hold them. Electives may be taken over the course of a full year or over the course of an academic term. Students are usually required to take several elective classes over the course of high school to graduate. This can include physical education and foreign language classes, but sometimes these are separate.

Common types of electives include:

- Visual arts (drawing, sculpture, painting, photography, film studies, and art history)
- Performing arts (choir, drama, band, orchestra, dance, guitar)
- Vocational education (woodworking, metalworking, computer-aided drafting, automobile repair, agriculture, cosmetology, FFA)
- Computer science/information technology (word processing, computer programming, robotics, graphic design, computer club, web design and web programming, video game design, music production)
- Journalism/publishing (school newspaper, yearbook, television production)
- Foreign languages (These are usually Spanish, French, and German, but schools have also offered Mandarin Chinese, Japanese, Latin, Greek, Russian, and even American Sign Language, among many others.)
- Business education (Accounting, Data Processing, Entrepreneurship, Finance, Business, Information and Communication Technology, Management, Marketing, and Secretarial)
- Family and consumer science/home economics (nutrition, nursing, culinary, child development)
- Junior Reserve Officers' Training Corps (In some schools, JROTC may replace a credit of health or P.E.) and gun clubs and shooting teams
- Some American high schools offer drivers' education. At some schools, a student can take it during school as a regular course for a credit. At some schools, drivers education courses are only available after school.

The Association for Career and Technical Education is the largest U.S. association dedicated to promoting this type of education.

=== Credits, grades, and graduation ===
High schools in the United States decide if students are able to graduate based on how many credits they have earned. How many credits are required to graduate and how many credits students earn from classes vary state by state. As an example, in Oregon, students are required to obtain a total of 24 credits before they graduate. At the end of a semester (halfway through the school year), the student earns 0.5 credits for each class they have a passing grade in (usually above 50%). If the student does not earn a credit, they are able to earn the credit through retaking the class, taking a specific credit recovery class, taking the class at a summer school, or taking the same or an equivalent class online. These options are also available for students who wish to get a better grade.

If a student does not have the total required credits needed to graduate at the end of their senior year of high school, the student will stay for another year or until they meet the required amount of credits. On the contrary, if a student earns enough credits required to graduate before the end of their senior year (usually at the end of 11th grade or the middle of 12th grade) they can graduate early.

Depending on the circumstances, students may receive a diploma different from the standard. Students that take a certain number of honors classes or college credit classes can receive an advanced diploma. The highest-performing student in the grade usually receives the valedictorian title, along with a special diploma. On the contrary, students with extenuating circumstances (for example, the COVID-19 pandemic) that negatively impacted or interrupted their learning may receive a modified diploma.

Usually, to graduate, students need to take and pass four years of English (or Language Arts) classes, four years of Social Studies (or History) classes, three years of Math classes, (but four are recommended), Three years of Science classes, (but four are recommended), two years of Foreign language classes, one year of a Health education class, one year of a Physical education class, and a varying number of elective classes.

Grades in American schools range from A (90% to 100%) to F (59% and below), excluding E. To pass a class and receive a credit for it, students usually need to receive a grade between A to D, or 100% to 60%. F, or 59% and below would be failing and students would not receive credit for the class. An A grade is for greatly exceeding the expected standard, a B grade is for exceeding the expected standard, a C is the expected standard, a D is falling behind the expected standard, and an F (or fail) is greatly behind the expected standard.

Sometimes a letter grade can have a + or a − next to it, related to what percentage was given.

- A+: 97% to 100%
- A: 96% to 94% (or 90% to 100%)
- A−: 93% to 90%
- B+: 89% to 87%
- B: 86% to 84% (or 80% to 89%)
- B−: 83% to 80%
- C+: 79% to 77%
- C: 76% to 74% (or 70% to 79%)
- C−: 73% to 70%
- D+: 69% to 67%
- D: 66% to 64% (or 60% to 69%)
- D−: 63% to 60%
- F(ail): 59% and below

Instructors may choose to have the lowest possible grade be a 50%, and only grade 0% to assignments that have not been turned in.

== Levels of education ==
=== Middle school / Junior high school ===
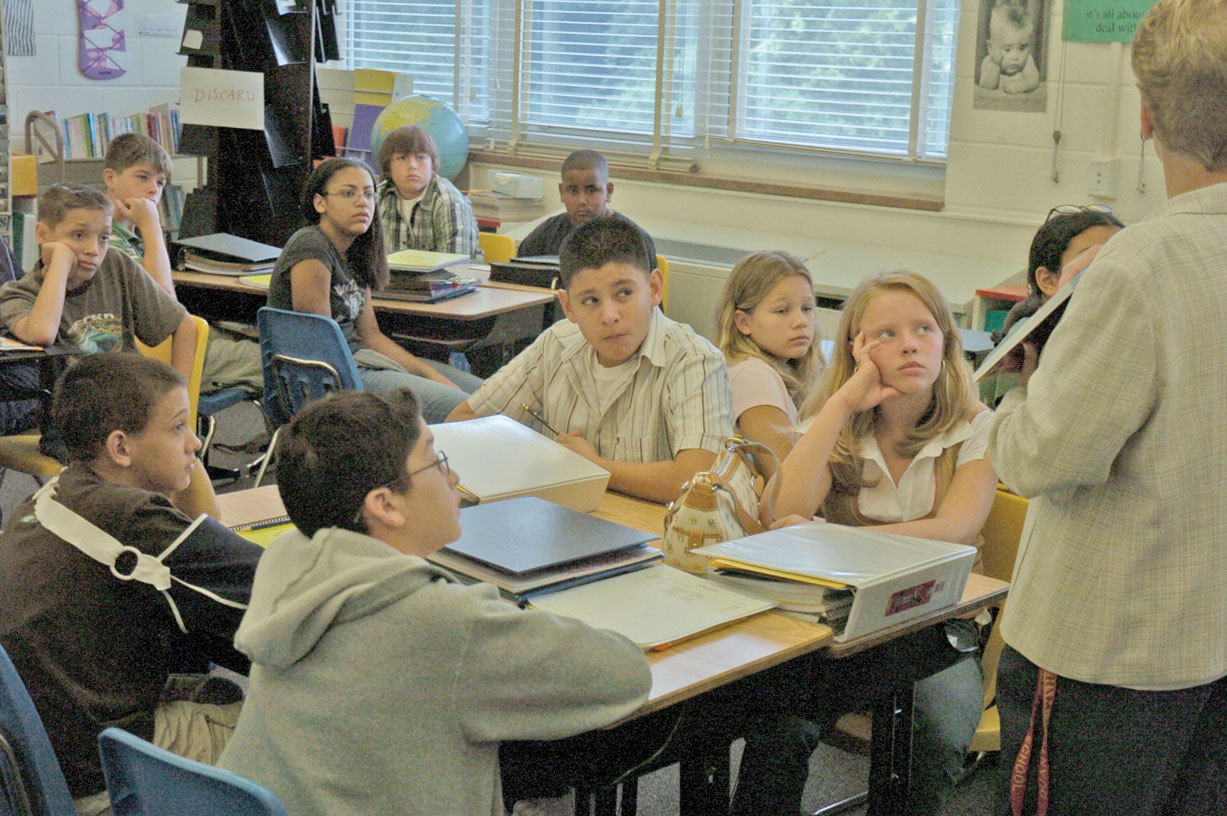
Middle school children in a language arts class

Middle schools and junior high schools are schools that which straddle elementary and high school education. "Middle" schools commonly serve sixth grade, seventh grade, and eighth grade; but in some districts, middle schools only have grades 7 and 8. "Junior high" schools, on the other hand, usually exclude sixth grade and often include ninth grade instead. Rarely, middle and junior high schools can also include fifth grade.

Upon arrival in middle school or junior high school, students begin to enroll in class schedules in which they will take classes with several teachers in different classrooms on any given day. (This is a sharp transition from the primary or elementary school model in which students remain with a single teacher in a single classroom.) The classes are usually a set of four or five (if foreign language is included in the curriculum) core academic classes (English or "language arts," science, mathematics, history or "social studies," and in some schools, foreign language) with two to four other classes, either electives, supplementary, or remedial academic classes.

However, one major difference between junior high and middle school is that the former operates on the high school model where students have different teachers for each subject, whereas the latter bridges the gap between elementary school and high school in that students are assigned to a team which consists of multiple teachers for the core subjects who teach and look after the same group of students.

Some students also start taking a foreign language or advanced math and science classes in middle school. Typically schools will offer Spanish and French; and, often German; and, sometimes Latin; Chinese, Japanese, and/or Greek. In addition to Pre-Algebra and other high school mathematics prep courses, Algebra I and Geometry are both commonly taught. Schools also offer Earth Science, Life Science, or Physical Science classes. Physical education classes (also called "PE", "phys ed", Kinesiology, or "gym") are usually mandatory for various periods. For social studies, some schools offer U.S. History, Geography, and World History classes.

Many also have honors classes for motivated and gifted students, where the quality of education is higher and much more is expected from the enrolled student.

==== Intermediate school ====
Intermediate school is an uncommon term, and can either be a synonym for middle school (notably as used by the New York City public schools) or for schools that encompass the latter years of elementary education prior to middle school/junior high school, serving grades 3 or 4 through 5 or 6. These can also be called "upper elementary" schools.

Breakdown of different models of primary, secondary, and post-secondary education

=== High school / Senior high school ===
High schools, or senior high schools, are schools that span grades 8, 9, or 10 through 12. Most American high schools are comprehensive high schools and accept all students from their local area, regardless of ability or vocational/college track. Students have significant control of their education, and may choose even their core classes, although the control given to students varies from state to state and school to school. The schools are managed by local school districts rather than by the central government.

Some states and cities offer special high schools with examinations to admit only the highest performing students, such as Boston Latin School, several schools in the New York City Specialized High School system or the Thomas Jefferson High School for Science and Technology in Alexandria, Virginia. Other high schools cater to the arts. Some schools have been set up for students who do not succeed with normal academic standards; while others, like Harvey Milk High School, have even been created for special social groups such as LGBT students.

Most states operate special residential schools for the blind and deaf, although a substantial number of such students are mainstreamed into standard schools. Several operate residential high schools for highly gifted students in specialized areas such as science, mathematics, or the arts. A smaller number of high schools are operated by the Department of Defense on military bases for children of military personnel.

Most high schools have classes known as "honors" classes for motivated and gifted students, where the quality of education is higher and much more is expected from the enrolled student. Some high schools offer Regular Honors (H) (sometimes called Advanced), Advanced Placement (AP) or International Baccalaureate (IB) courses, which are special forms of honors classes. International schools offering programs of study in line with foreign systems of Education, such as those of Britain and France, are also available. Some schools also offer dual-enrollment programs, in which select classes at a university may be taken for both university and high school credit.

Graduation from high school or senior high school leads to the awarding of the high school diploma. After this, secondary education is considered complete and students may pursue tertiary level study.

== Types of schools ==
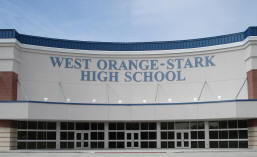
West Orange-Stark High School, a college preparatory high school in West Orange, Texas

Secondary education can be provided within a number of different schools and settings.

=== Public schools ===
The United States public education system is structured into three levels: elementary (also known as primary) education, middle and high school (which is secondary together) education, and college or university level (also known as post-secondary) education. Schooling starts at age 5–6 and ends anywhere from 16 to 18 depending on the school system, state policy, and the student's progress. Pre-School or Pre-Kindergarten accept as young as age 3 and is not required. From there education models differ as elementary school can last anywhere from grade 5 (age 10–11) to grade 8 (age 13–14) depending on the structure. Some states have middle schools which is part of secondary education and between elementary school and high school encompassing grades from 6 to 9, while others have no middle school and instead combined mixed high schools.

All children are guaranteed the right to a free public elementary and secondary education when living within the jurisdiction of the United States regardless of race, gender, ability, citizen status, religion or economic status. Public education in the United States is mainly the responsibility of State and local level administration levels. As of 2010–2011 around 13,588 school districts exist within which around 98,800 public schools exist in the United States. Only 8% of funding for public schools comes from federal sources, the other 92% comes mostly from state and local funding. Curriculum requirements vary state by state as it is up to these states and local school districts, in addition to national associations if applicable, to come up with and be approved by the federal government in order for them to receive funding. Most schools mark proficiency in a subject through the A-F grading scale accumulating throughout years creating a grade point average or G.P.A. Parent involvement is encouraged in the U.S. with many having parent–teacher associations otherwise known as PTAs.

=== Independent schools ===
Independent schools are schools that are not public and not run by any government, but rather function as an independent institution. Independent schools range from levels of kindergarten to undergraduate, various institution usually accommodating different levels. Most independent schools have a tuition cost of attendance. As of 2013–2014 there were 33,619 independent schools in the United States. Most independent schools in the United States are associated with religious orientations making up 68.7% of all private schools as of 2013–2014. This number had an increasing trend in the period of 1989–2005. It dropped by about 9% in 2006–2007, but seems to be increasing again.

All independent schools must comply with federal laws of non-discrimination, health privacy, and financial security laws. These include:

- Age Discrimination in Employment Act (for employees or applicants over the age of 40)
- Americans with Disabilities Act
- Equal Pay Act
- 42 U.S.C. § 1986 (discrimination based on race)
- Pregnancy Discrimination Act of 1979
- Title VII of the Civil Rights Act of 1964 (discrimination based on race, color, sex, religion, and/or national origin)
- Uniformed Services Employment and Reemployment Rights Act (employment or reemployment discrimination based on military service)
- Revenue Procedure 75-50 (independent schools can not discriminate on the basis of race in any programs or financial assistance)

More specific legal restrictions apply to private schools on the state level and vary based on the state.

Independent schools can accept money from the federal government otherwise called "Federal financial assistance" which can come as funds in the form of grants or loans, donations, assets and property or interest in property, services by federal employees or contract of intent to receive federal assistance, involvement in federal programs. Schools receiving funding must comply with additional federal regulations included in many of the above acts. However, a policy can also have exceptions to these regulations based on the private school characteristics, such as religious beliefs that the law would be defying or being involved in military development.

=== Charter schools ===
Charter schools are subject to fewer rules, regulations, and statutes than traditional state schools, receive less public funding than public schools, typically a fixed amount per pupil and are often over-subscribed.

=== College-preparatory schools ===
College-preparatory schools, commonly referred to as "prep schools", can be either publicly funded, charter schools or private independent secondary schools funded by tuition fees and philanthropic donations, and governed by independent boards of trustees. Fewer than 1% of students enrolled in school in the United States attend an independent private preparatory school, a small fraction compared with the 9% who attend parochial schools and 88% who attend public schools. While these schools are not subject to government oversight or regulation, they are accredited by one of the six regional accreditation agencies for educational institutions.

=== Homeschooling ===
It is estimated that some 2 million or 2.9% of U.S. children are home educated. Home schooling is lawful in all 50 states, and although the U.S. Supreme Court has never ruled on homeschooling specifically, in Wisconsin v. Yoder, 406 U.S. 205 (1972) it supported the rights of Amish parents to keep their children out of public schools for religious reasons.

== Types of scheduling ==
At the secondary level, students transition from the American primary education system of remaining with one class in one classroom with one teacher for the entire school day to taking multiple courses taught by different teachers in different classrooms. This system is also used by American colleges and universities at both the undergraduate and graduate levels. It requires students to develop time management and navigation skills in order to efficiently race from one classroom to the next during each school day, and to develop interpersonal communication skills in order to interact with many more teachers and classmates than before.

=== Traditional scheduling ===
Students take six, seven, eight, or sometimes nine classes per day all year long. Six classes are around 50–60 minutes in length. Seven classes are around 45–52 minutes in length. Eight classes are around 40–48 minutes in length. Nine classes are around 42 minutes or less in length.

=== Block scheduling ===
==== Alternate day block scheduling ====
Also referred to as A/B (day) scheduling, odd/even (day) scheduling, or (day) 1/2 block scheduling. Students take three to four courses, around 90–120 minutes in length, per day all year long on alternating days resulting in a full six or eight courses per year. An example table of a possible schedule is provided below.

A/B Block Scheduling
| Time | A Day | B Day |
|---|---|---|
| 8:30–10:00 | Mathematics | English |
| 10:15–11:45 | Spanish | Computer science |
| 12:00–1:00 | Lunch |
| 1:15–2:45 | History | Biology |
| 3:00–4:30 | Physical Education | Political science |

==== 4×4 Block Scheduling ====
Students take four courses, around 90 minutes in length, every day for the first semester and take four different courses every day for the second semester. This results in a full eight courses taken per year. An example table of a possible schedule is provided below.

4×4 Block Scheduling
| Time | Semester 1 | Semester 2 |
|---|---|---|
| 7:30–9:00 | Math | English |
| 9:05–10:35 | Spanish | Computers |
| 10:40–11:25 | Lunch |
| 11:30–1:00 | History | Science |
| 1:05–2:35 | Physical Education | Health |

== Teacher certification ==
Teachers are certified in one of two areas for high school (and in some states, certification can be to teach grades 6–12). These certifications can overlap. In Missouri, for example, middle school certification covers grades 6–8, elementary school certification covers kindergarten to grade 5, and high school certification covers grades 9–12. This reflects the wide range of grade combinations of middle schools, junior high schools, and elementary schools. Alternatively, some states certify teachers in various curricular areas (such as math or history) to teach secondary education.

== Compulsory education ==
Compulsory education laws refer to "legislative mandates that school-aged children [shall] attend public, nonpublic, or homeschools until reaching specified ages." In most cases, local school attendance officers enforce compulsory education laws, and all jurisdictions hold parents/legal guardians responsible to ensure their child/children attend school.

Compulsory education first became required in Massachusetts upon the passing of the Compulsory Attendance Act of 1852. The law required that all children eight to fourteen to attend school for three months out of the year, and of these twelve weeks, six of them had to be consecutive. The only exceptions to this law was if the child already attended another school for the same amount of time, proof the child had already learned the material, if they lived in poverty, or the child had a physical or mental disability preventing them from learning the material.

Later, in 1873, the law was revised. The age limit was reduced from 14 to 12, but the annual attendance requirement was increased to 20 weeks a year. By 1918, all U.S. states had some sort of mandatory attendance law for school.

== See also ==
- Lists of schools in the United States
- Comprehensive high school
- Education in the United States
  - History of education in the United States
- Normal schools in the United States
- Primary education in the United States
- Secondary education
- Shopping mall high school
