= Labor force in the United States =

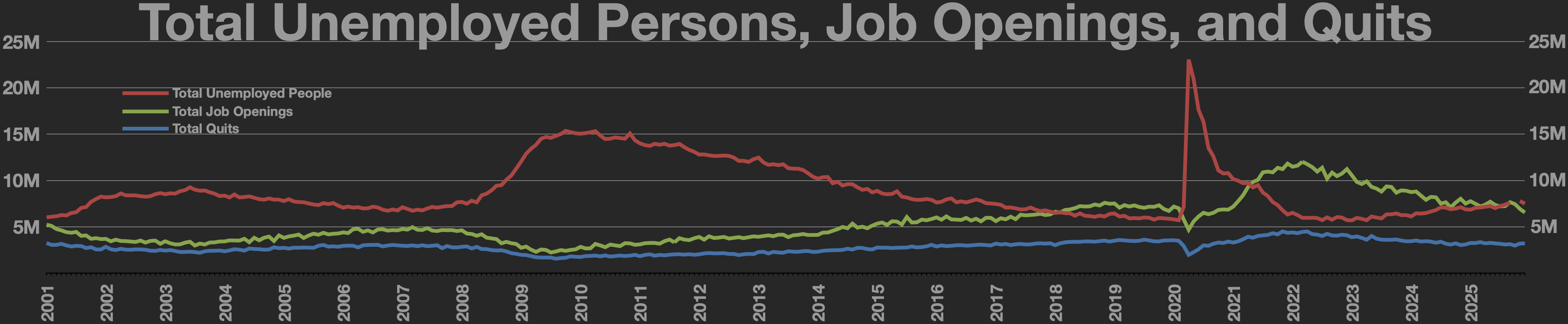
Total unemployed people Total job openings Total quits

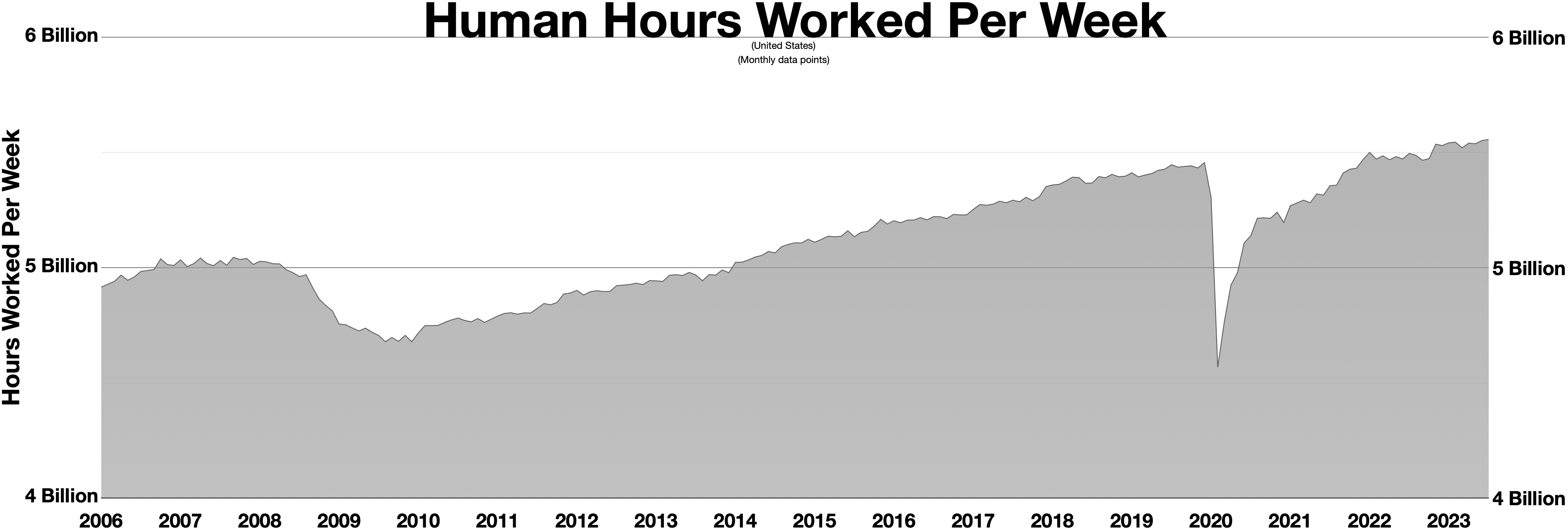
Human hours worked per week

The labor force is the actual number of people 16 years and older available for work and is the sum of the employed and the unemployed. The U.S. labor force reached a record high of 170.7 million civilians in January 2025. In February 2020, at the start of the COVID-19 pandemic in the United States, there were 164.6 million civilians in the labor force. Before the pandemic, the U.S. labor force had risen each year since 1960 with the exception of the period following the Great Recession, when it remained below 2008 levels from 2009 to 2011. In 2021, The Great Resignation resulted in record numbers in voluntary turnover for American workers.

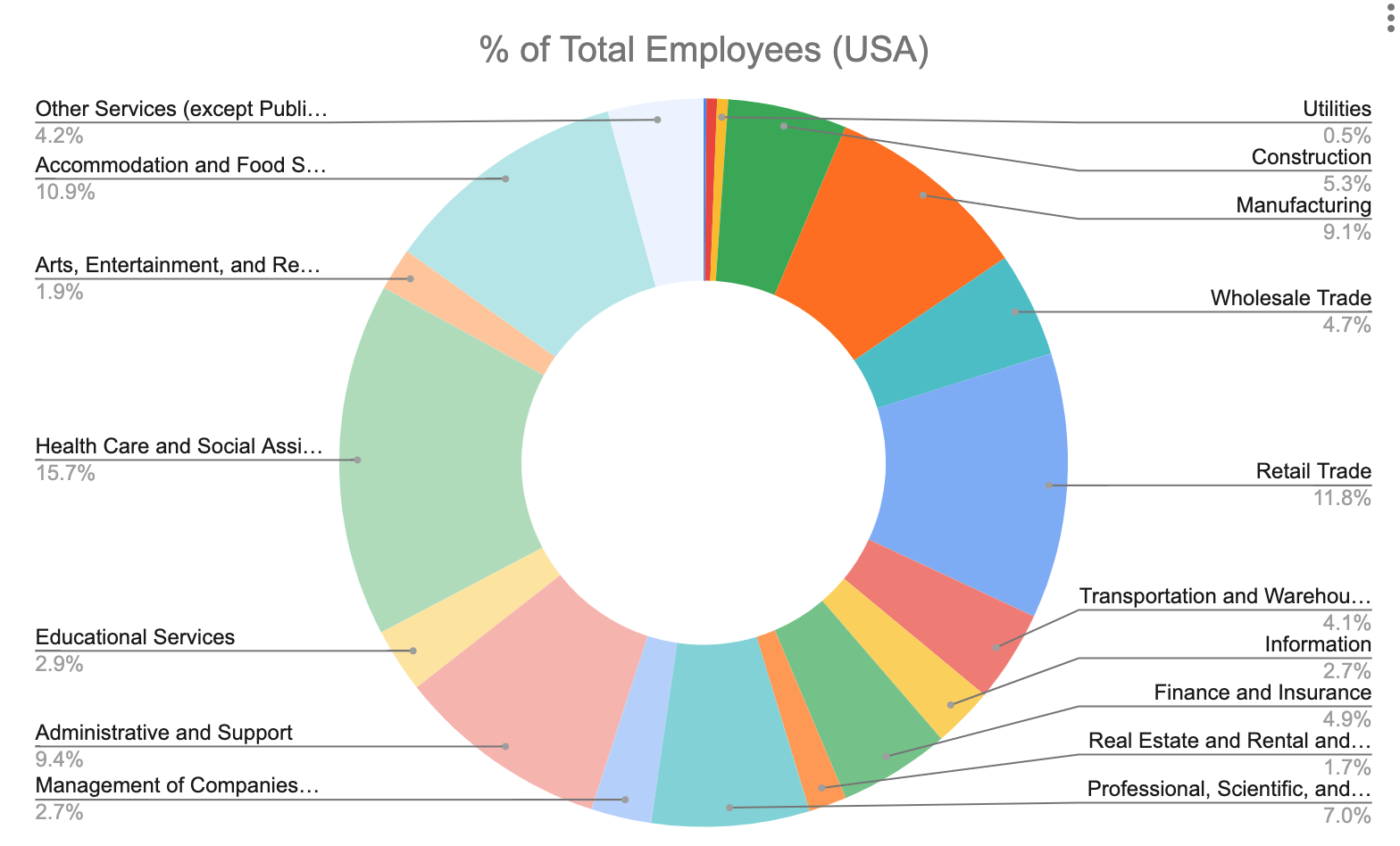
US Census Bureau Employment (NAICS/SIC)

The labor force participation rate, LFPR (or economic activity rate, EAR), is the ratio between the labor force and the overall size of their cohort (national population of the same age range). Much as in other countries in the West, the labor force participation rate in the U.S. increased significantly during the later half of the 20th century, largely due to women entering the workplace in increasing numbers. Labor force participation has declined steadily since 2000, primarily because of the aging and retirement of the Baby Boom generation. Analyzing labor force participation trends in the prime working age (25-54) cohort helps separate the impact of an aging population from other demographic factors (e.g., gender, race, and education) and government policies. The Congressional Budget Office explained in 2018 that higher educational attainment is correlated with higher labor force participation for workers aged 25 to 54. Prime-aged men who are out of the labor force tend to be out due to disability, while a key reason for women is caring for family members.

== Definition ==
The Bureau of Labor Statistics (BLS) defines the labor force as:

Included are persons 16 years of age and older residing in the 50 States and the District of Columbia who are not inmates of institutions (for example, penal and mental facilities, homes for the aged), and who are not on active duty in the Armed Forces.

== Gender and the U.S. labor force ==
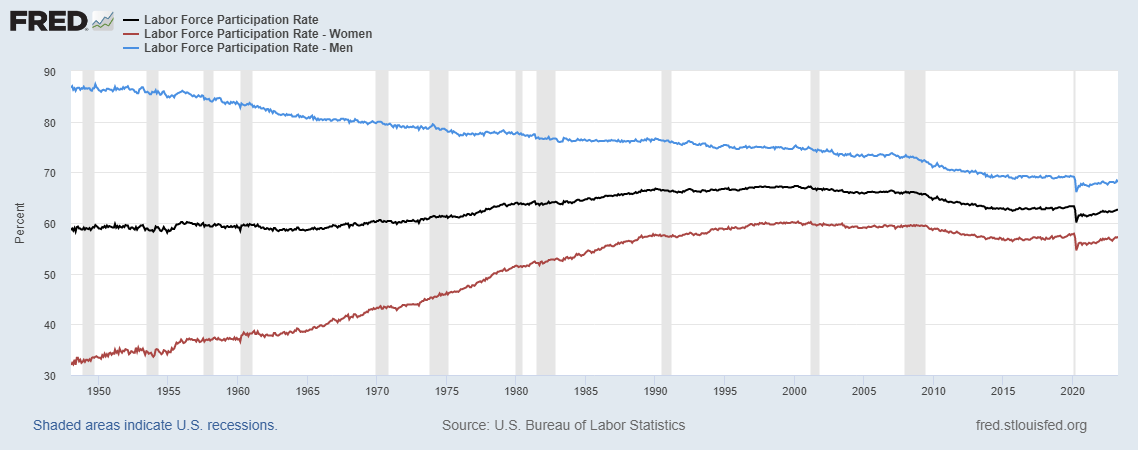
US labor force participation rate from 1948 to 2021, by gender. Male participation Total labor force participation Female participation

=== Women ===
In the United States, there were three significant stages of women's increased participation in the labor force. During the late 19th century through the 1920s, very few women were employed. Working women were often young single women who typically withdrew from labor force at marriage unless their family needed two incomes. These women worked primarily in the textile manufacturing industry or as domestic workers.

Between 1930 and 1950, female labor force participation increased primarily due to increased demand for office workers, the high school movement, and electrification, which reduced the time spent on household chores. In the 1950s to the 1970s, most women were secondary earners working mainly as secretaries, teachers, nurses, and librarians (pink-collar jobs).

Starting from 1960, the world and the U.S. witnessed a significant increase in female LFP in the labor market, especially in developed countries such as Europe and the U.S. According to Congressional Research Service, the gap for LFP between women and men has been smaller since 1979. The cumulative percentage change in real wages for women increased by 9.6%, while for men it decreased by 7.7%, but still remained higher than that of women. Only men with bachelor's degrees or higher averaged higher actual earnings than women.

Claudia Goldin and others, specifically point out that by the mid-1970s there was a period of revolution of women in the labor force brought on by different factors. In the United States, the LFP rate rose from approximately 59% in 1948 to 66% in 2005, with participation among women rising from 32% to 59% and participation among men declining from 87% to 73%.

A common theory in modern economics claims that the rise of women participating in the US labor force in the late 1960s was due to the introduction of a new contraceptive technology, birth control pills, and the adjustment of age of majority laws. According to the University of Chicago Press Journal, there was a significant change in women's first marriage and education careers. Most women interviewees answered that the change was because of the pill. However, from 1980, married women were willing to work regardless of their husband's employment situation. However, only 40% of the population actually used the birth control pill.

Another factor that may have contributed to the trend was the Equal Pay Act of 1963, which aimed at abolishing wage disparity based on sex. Such legislation diminished sexual discrimination and encouraged more women to enter the labor market by receiving fair remuneration to help raise children. The 1964 Civil Rights Act and Title IX in 1972 also increased women's LFP. The Equal Pay Act protects both men and women against discrimination on account of sex in the payments of wages.

According to Claire Cain Miller, NYT, other wealthy countries, such as Denmark, Germany, and Norway, spend an average of $14,000 annually for childcare while the U.S. government supports only $500.

==== Historical trends ====
According to the US Census in 1861, one third of women were in the labor force and of these one fourth were married women.

According to Ellen DuBoise and Lynn Dumenil, they estimate that the number of women in the labor force from 1800 - 1900 are:

By Year	% Women in Labor force	Women as % of Total Labor Force
1800	4.6%	4.6%
1810	7.9%	9.4%
1820	6.2%	7.3%
1830	6.4%	7.4%
1840	8.4%	9.6%
1850	10.1%	10.8%
1860	9.7%	10.2%
1870	13.7%	14.8%
1880	14.7%	15.2%
1890	18.2%	17.0%
1900	21.2%	18.1%

According to the US Department of Labor and U.S. Bureau of Labor Statistics:

By Year	% Women in Labor force	Women as % of Total Labor Force
1920	N/A	20.3%
1930	N/A	21.9%
1940	N/A	24.4%
1950	33.9%	27.4%
1960	37.7%	32.2%
1970	43.3%	37.5%
1980	51.5%	42.2%
1990	57.5%	45.3%
2000	59.9%	46.5%
2010	58.6%	47.3%
2019	57.8%	47.4%

According to the US Department of Labor, as of 2017 women make up 47% of the total labor force with 70% of them mothers with children under 18 years of age.

=== Men ===
According to the U.S. Bureau of Labor Statistics, men's LFP decreased since 1950 with 86.4%, 79.7% in 1970, 76.4% in 1990, and 73.3% in 2005. In addition, a decline in male education participation, age of marriage, the rise of substance abuse, and addiction to video games could lead to a decrease in Men LFP.

According to the Federal Reserve Bank of Kansas City, from 1996 to 2015, men in the prime age with a high-school degree or associate's degree have a nonparticipation rate much higher than those holding advanced degrees. During the Great Recession, overall, the nonparticipation rate increased for everyone regardless of their education level, but the greatest increase was for those with only a high school diploma.

The aging in the U.S. population also explained the decrease in Men LFP. The median age of males increased from 34 years old to 37.2 years old with more people over 65 years old and fewer people of labor age. According to the 2020 Current Population Survey, most men who were out of the labor force self-reported they could not work due to illness, disability, or due to attending higher education. Regarding the Social Security Disability Program, 35% of recipients responded their disability was due to mental health disorder. Another 30% responded their disability correlated to musculoskeletal disorders, many of which are due to obesity.

Both men's and women's LFP rate increased after COVID-19. According to Science Advances, more than half of unemployed men in their 30s have a criminal arrest history.

==== Historical Trends ====
According to the U.S. Bureau of Labor Statistics:

By Year	% Men in Labor force
1950	86.4%
1960	83.3%
1970	79.7%
1980	77.4%
1990	76.4%
2000	74.8%
2010	71.2%
2019	69.2%

== Race and the U.S. Labor Force ==
=== Occupation ===
According to the US Bureau of Labor Statistics, as of 2019 Asians are most likely to hold a management position, while Hispanics or Latinos are most likely to hold a job in the service sector.

According to the U.S Bureau of Labor Statistics, male LFP decreased and has continued decreasing since 1950 with 86.4%, 79.7% in 1970, 76.4% in 1990, and 73.3% in 2005. Experts predict that this decrease could remain and become higher over the years because of different policies such as the Social Security Act (1960). In addition, a decline in male education participation, age of marriage, the rise of substance abuse, and addiction to video gaming could lead to the decrease in male LFP. This decrease in male labor force participation rate was probably from the benefit of disability insurance, especially in the group of less-educated men.

According to the article "Why are prime-age men vanishing from the labor force?" (Economic review , Federal Reserve Bank of Kansas City, first quarter 2018), author found that from 1996 to 2015, most men in the prime-age who only hold a high-school degree or associate's degree would have a nonparticipation rate much higher than those who hold an advanced degree. There were studies that showed that the demand in low-skilled workers had been down during 1970 to 1980. Alternatively, the demand of middle-skilled labors during that period of time increased significantly, this could be explained since organizations tried to replace the low-skilled workers and used middle-skilled workers. During the Great Recession, overall, the nonparticipation rate increased for everyone regardless of their education level. However, the author tried to dig deeper and categorized men into four different groups: those, who do not have a high school diploma, who have a high school diploma, who have an associate's degree, and who have a bachelor's degree or higher. It was obvious that the greatest increase was from the group with only a high school diploma.

The aging in U.S population also explained the decrease in Men LFP. The median-age of male was increased from 34 years old to 37.2 years old. In addition, baby-boomer numbers increased which meant more people over 65 years old, and fewer people who were of labor age. With these numbers, even though the labor force participation rate remained same, the aging in population still could affect and drag the LFPR down. According to the 2020 Current Population Survey, most men reported that they were not able to work due to higher education, ill health, or disability, however, this is a self-report. Regarding the Social Security Disability Program, 35% of recipients responded that their disability was due to mental health disorder. According to National Library of Medicine, the percentage of men diagnosed with depression was lower than women, yet the effect on the male labor force participation rate was considerable. There were different reasons leading to this, it could be unrecognized, undiagnosed, and untreated. Another 30% responded that their disability correlated to musculoskeletal disorder, much due to obesity.

The men LFPR tend to increase further after COVID-19. Experts said that there are many reasons could lead to this results. People within the age that about to retire would like to retire earlier, even though they are healthy, they would prefer to spend their time for family, hobbies, or voluntary. In addition, COVID-19 created a threat to most people, especially who have problem with their health before. Another reason could be many companies are trying to move their plant to different countries where could cut companies' costs and benefits. According to Science Advances, more than half of men in their 30s has a criminal history arrest. This could be another reason explains why men nonparticipation rate increases.

Statistics from the US Bureau of Labor Statistics 2019 Annual Survey
Race	Production, transportation, and material moving	Natural resources, construction, and maintenance	Sales and office	Service	Management, professional, and related
White	11.3	10.1	21.3	15.9	41.4
Black or African American	16.2	5.7	22.3	23.8	31.9
Asian	9.1	3.1	17	15.8	55
Hispanic or Latino	15.4	16.4	20.6	24.2	23.3

=== Health Inequalities in the Labor Force ===
A person's occupation is one of the main social determinants of health which greatly contributes to health inequalities and health disparities, racially and ethnically. Determinants under the occupation category include: income, housing, paid sick leave and health insurance; they are related to a person's socioeconomic status. The U.S. health care system is connected to employment and it is very likely that a worker is paying for health insurance through their employer; low-wage workers who opt for coverage through their employment pay a higher portion from their income than their middle- income and higher- income counterparts. There is a disproportionate number of employed workers, based on race across the labor sectors, especially those of high- risk.

Number of People in the Work Sector
Race	Educational, Health & Social Services	Arts, Entertainment, Recreation, Accommodation & Food Services	Retail Trade	Transportation, Warehousing & Utilities
White	7.5 million	4.2 million	7 million	4.1 million
Black/ African American	1.4 million	871,000	1.3 million	658,000
Asian	738,000	435,000	495,000	133,000

*Numbers in the table are estimated.

Income, Poverty, and Health Insurance

The updated data from U.S Census Bureau in September 2022 does not change or is slightly different compared to last year's period. Three factors are being discussed:

- The Supplemental Poverty Measure (SPM)
- People with Health Insurance coverage
- Household Income

The Supplemental Poverty Measure (SPM). According to Congressional Research Service, SPM is a measure of economic deprivation. This tool helps to collect, effort, and report the data of individuals, households, etc., living with a lack of financial resources to reach a certain standard of living. Poverty thresholds are family size and composition. People will be considered their poverty status based on their financial resources against the thresholds. Those whose financial resources are lower than thresholds will be regarded as poor. In 2021, the official poverty rate was 11.6%, equal to 37.9 million people in poverty, and SPM was 7.8%, slightly decreasing compared with 9.2% in 2020 and 11.7% in 2019. SPM in 2021 was also the lowest rate since 2009.

Health Insurance Coverage. There are two sector, public and private insurance. According to Center for Disease Control and Prevention statistics, in 2021, 13.5% of people aged 18–64 were uninsured, 39.5% used public insurance, and 60.4% used private insurance. Even though personal insurance coverage is more common than public insurance coverage, and people typically change insurance type during the calendar year, in 2021, the percentage of general insurance coverage will be higher than private compared to 2020. The data from the National Center for Health Statistics, the ratio of adult aged from 18 to 64 that are uninsured tend to decrease and is related to households' income level. The percentage of uninsured people from 18 to 64 fell and significantly decreased as the following 24.5%, 23.7%, and 8.4%. The Federal Poverty Level (FPL) is divided into less than 100%, above 100%, less than 200%, and 200%.

Income. Similarly to SPM, there is no significant change in revenue in 2021 compared to 2020, $70,784 vs. $71,186. Although the total number of workers in both years is the same, the status of employees tends to move from part-time to full-time employees in 2021. Part-time employees have higher median earnings than full-time employees, about 4.1%.

==== During COVID-19 ====
The Family First Coronavirus Act (FFCRA), provided mandated paid sick leave for workers that are impacted by COVID-19 and people of color are affected since because of the exemptions in that law; only certain public employers, private employers of less than 500 employees, and small business with less than 50 employees may qualify for the mandate. COVID-19 affected workers disproportionately, with Black and non-White races more likely to make up the baseline of the essential workforce this exposes to them to infections causing them to be unable to or to continue to work; FFCRA (2020) was passed in hopes of protecting workers but the ambiguity of the law puts minorities' paid sick leave at risk. Less than 30% of the workforce in the United States have paid sick leave that is protected by state law

== Analyzing the labor force participation rate ==
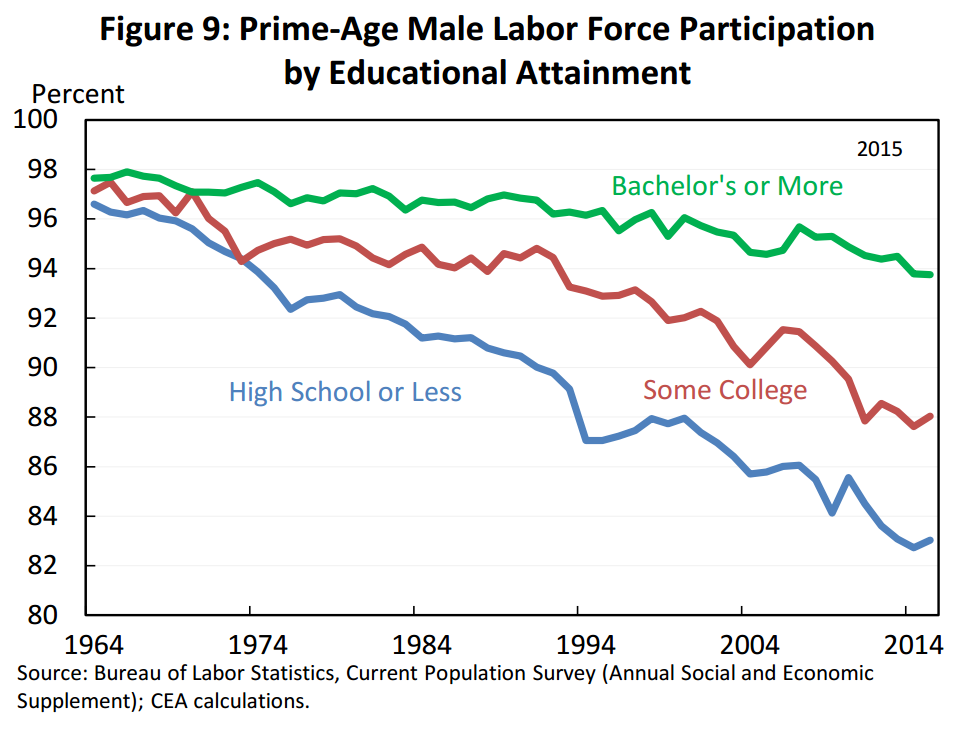
The line chart shows the long-term decline in labor force participation for U.S. males of prime-working age (25–54 years), based on educational attainment.

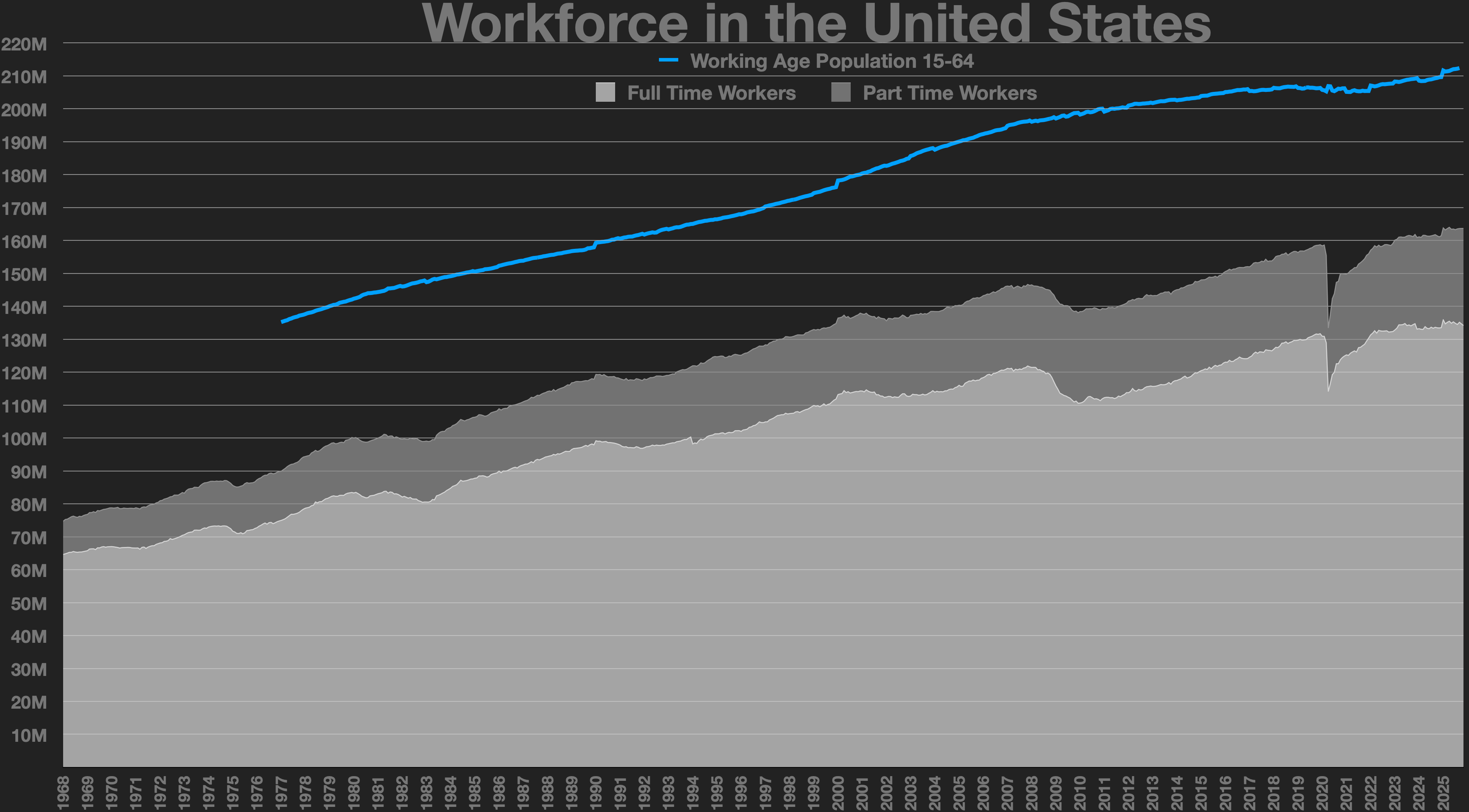
Workforce in the United States Working age population 15-64 Part time employment Full time employment

=== Overall rate ===
From 1962 to 1999, women entering the U.S. workforce represented a nearly 8 percentage point increase in the overall LFPR, which may be at least partly due to rising educational attainment level among women. Higher labor force participation is correlated with higher educational attainment.

The overall LFPR has been falling in the U.S. since its all-time high point of 67.3% reached in January–April 2000, reaching 62.7% by January 2018. This decline since 2000 is primarily driven by the retirement of the Baby Boom generation. Since the overall labor force is defined as those age 16+, an aging society with more persons past the typical prime working age (25-54) exerts a steady downward influence on the LFPR. The decline was forecast by economists and demographers going back into the 1990s, if not earlier. For example, during 1999 the BLS forecast that the overall LFPR would be 66.9% in 2015 and 63.2% in 2025. A 2006 forecast by Federal Reserve economists (before the Great Recession that began in December 2007) estimated the LFPR would be below 64% by 2016, close to the 62.7% average that year.

The LFPR decreases when the percentage increase in the defined population (denominator) is greater than the percentage increase in the labor force (i.e., the sum of employed and unemployed, the numerator). With respect to the unemployment rate, if the percentage increase in the number of unemployed (numerator) is greater than the percentage increase in the number in the labor force (denominator), the unemployment rate will rise.

=== Prime working age rate ===
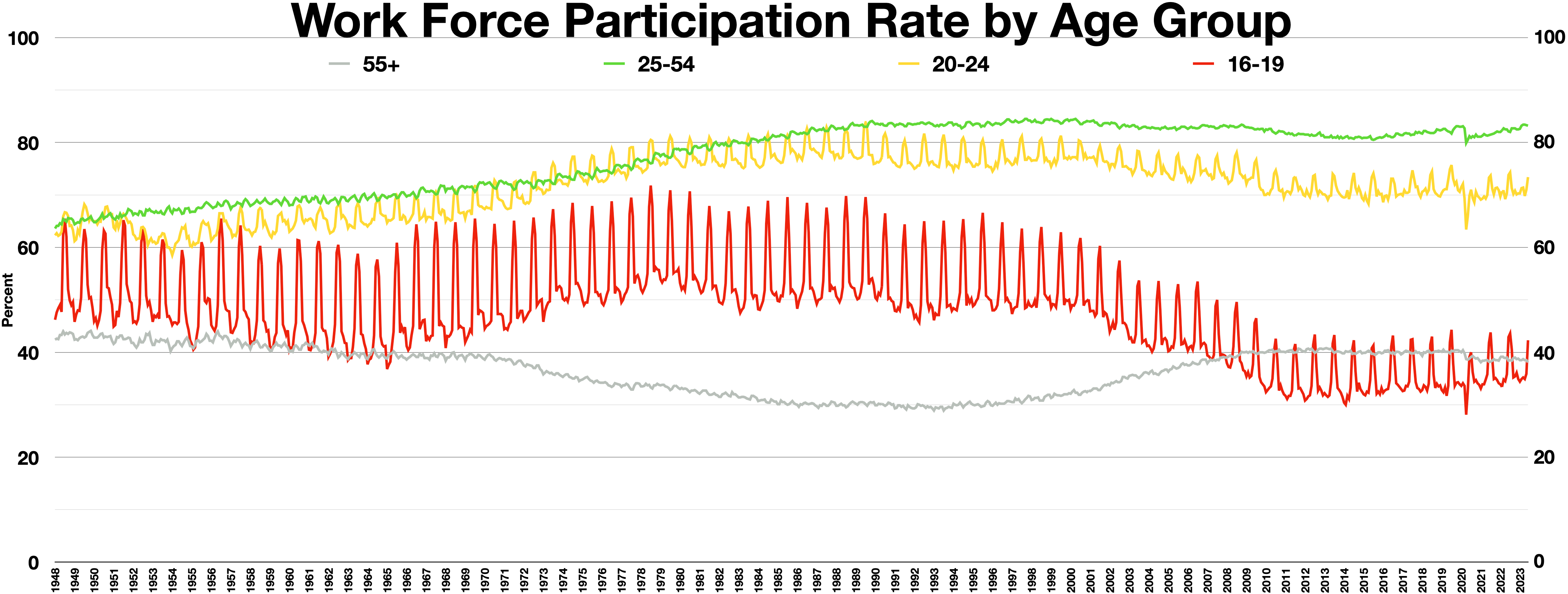
Work Force Participation Rate by Age Group 55+ 25-54 20-24 16-19

Economists also analyze the LFPR for those prime-aged workers, aged 25–54. Mathematically, this ratio is the total civilian labor force age 25–54 divided by the total civilian population of that age cohort. The prime-aged LFPR peaked at 84.5% at three times between October 1997 and April 2000. Prior to the Great Recession, the rate was 83.3% in November 2007, then fell to a trough of 80.5% in July 2015, before steadily climbing back to 81.7% in January 2018. It is one of the few key labor market variables that had yet to recover its pre-crisis level as of January 2018 and is an indicator of slack in the labor market.

- Men's prime-aged labor force participation has been falling consistently since at least the 1960s. It ranged between 93% and 95% during the 1980s, fell to around 90% during the 2000s and was 88.5% in October 2017.
- Women's prime-aged labor force participation rose consistently from at least the early 1960s, reaching a peak of 77.2% in August 1997. It has fluctuated around 75% since then.

=== Teen labor force participation ===
The LFPR peaked in 1979 in the U.S. AT 57.9%. In the early 21st century, there was a continued decrease in the teen LFPR, which was expected to continue to decline from 2017 to 2024, at least partly due to more young people attending college rather than entering the workforce.

According to a Pew Research Center analysis on monthly 1944-2017 Current Population Survey, Millennials aged 16+ represented the largest generation in the U.S. labor force and the highest quote since the postwar, with more than 35% of participants working or looking for a work.

=== Participation during COVID-19 ===
The COVID-19 pandemic led to a massive drop in persons in the labor force. According to Pew Research Center, from February 2020 to February 2021 an estimated 4.2 million people left the labor force because of COVID-19, 2.4 million of which were women. As a result, women's participation in the labor force was at a 30-year low.

==== The Great Resignation ====
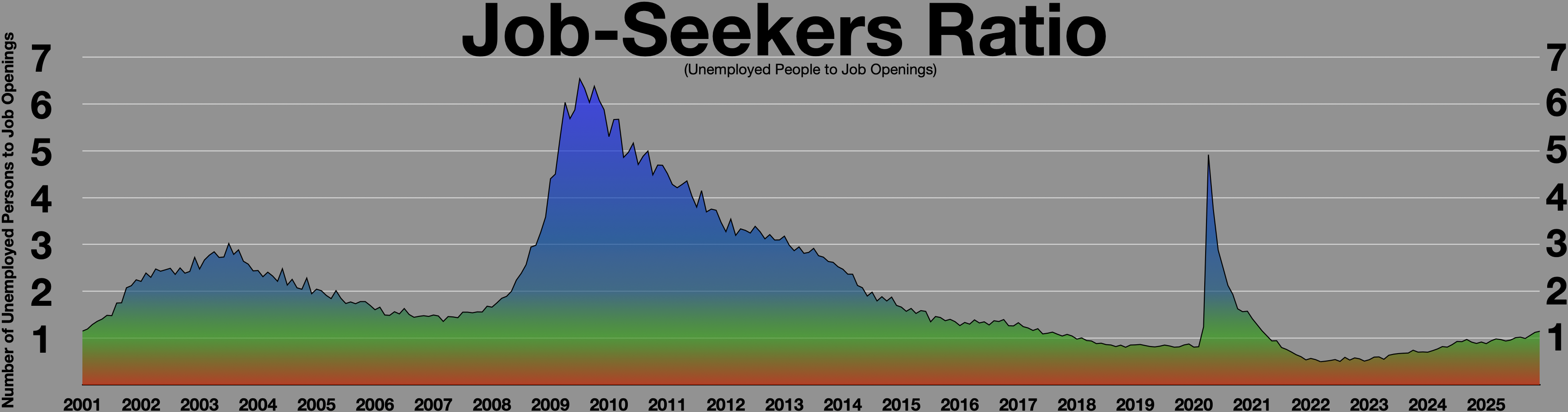
Job seekers ratio Cold job market Balanced job market Hot job market

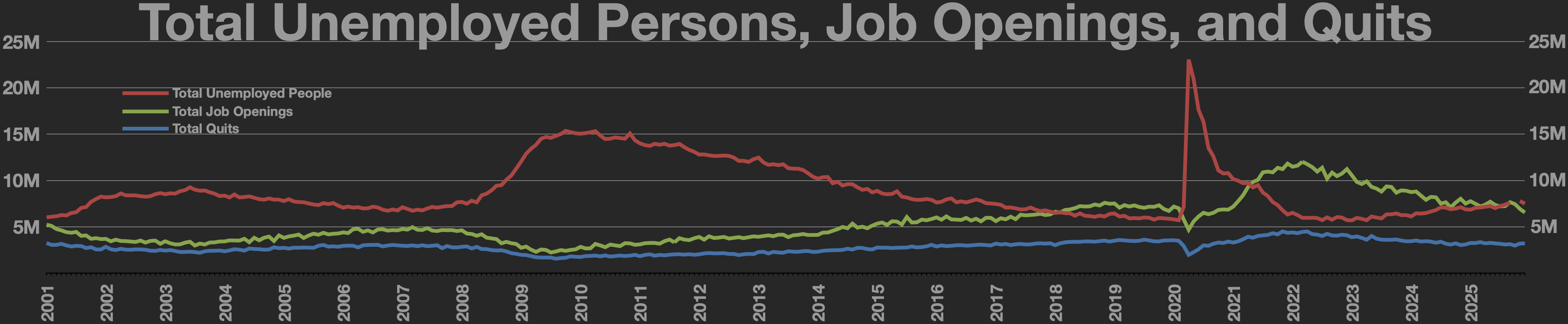
Total unemployed people Total job openings Total quits

The pandemic created a shift in the labor market where workers began voluntarily leaving their jobs in large numbers. By July 2021, 4 million workers had voluntarily separated from their employer. A number of factors were impacting the trend which started in early 2021. With the risks associated with returning to unsafe working conditions, lack of childcare, and overall employee burnout, employers were experiencing higher turnover rates with little evidence of slowdown. According to the U.S. Chamber of Commerce, all industries in the U.S. labor market were impacted with highest numbers in hospitality and healthcare, while construction, mining, and oil/gas industries saw little to no impact. A Society for Human Resource Management (SHRM) survey found that younger people were less likely to leave the workforce than older generations.

A shift in worker attitudes, overall priorities, and perception of their relationship with their jobs was a symptom of the pandemic, which forced many to drastically change the way they work and live. For example, some workers developed a quiet quitting mindset by deliberately limiting their work activities to formal job descriptions, meeting yet not exceeding the preestablished expectations, and never volunteering for additional tasks.

== Foreign-born workers ==
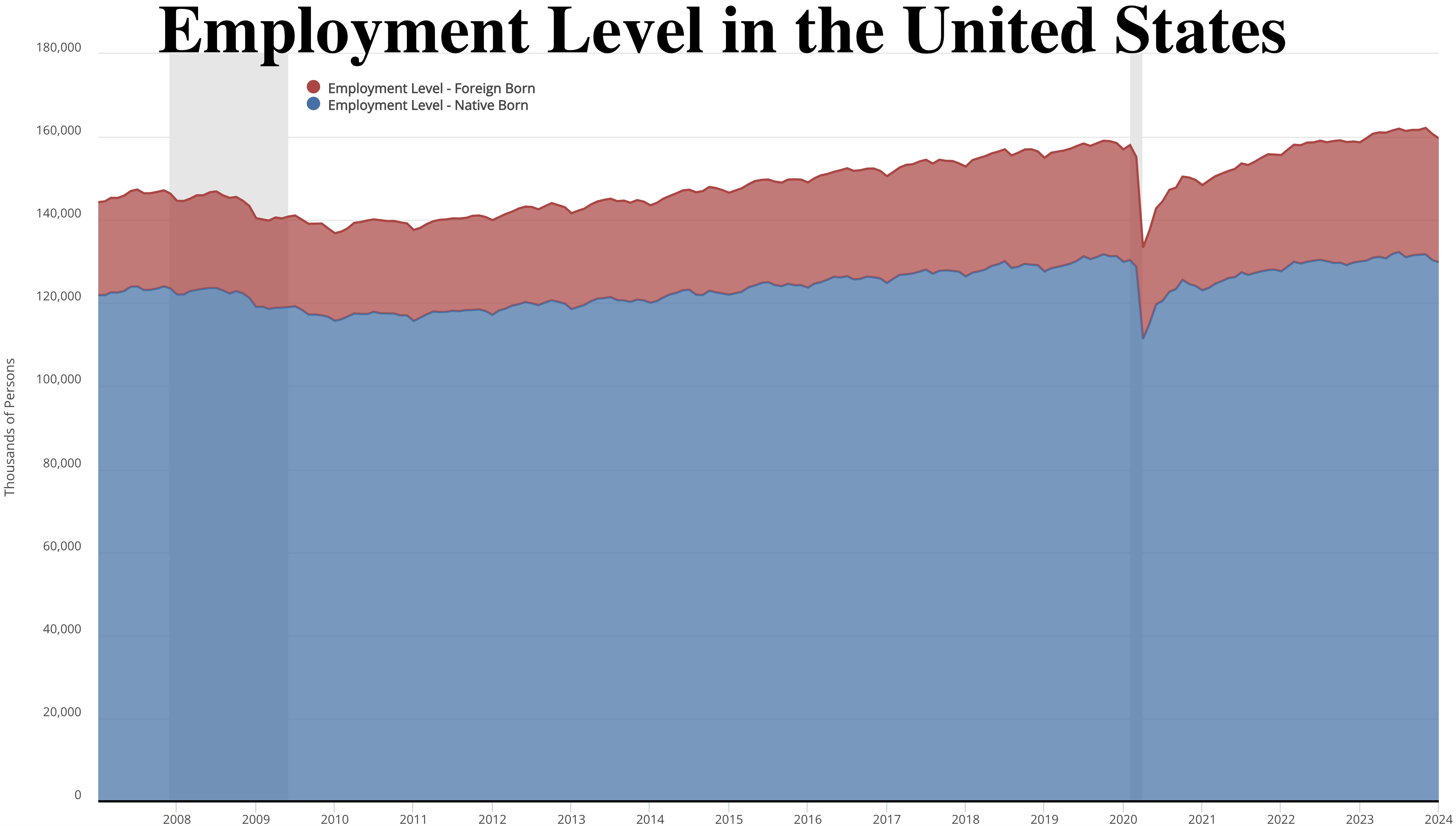
Employment level in the United States Foreign-born workers Native-born workers

There were 27.8 million foreign-born workers in the labor force as of January 2018. This group had an overall LFPR of 65.1% in January 2018. As of 2013, the highest group of people participating in the Foreign-born immigrant labor force in the United States were individuals from Mexico and Central America. They made up of 40.3 percent of the immigrant labor force participation. Mexico heavily outweighed Central America in which they held the majority of workers with 32 percent of workers just from Mexico. In 2013, California held most of the foreign-born worker immigrants in the United States, with about half from Mexico and Central America.

=== Foreign-born women ===
In 2025, foreign-born workers accounted for 19.1 percent of the U.S. civilian labor force. Their labor force participation rate was 66.3 percent, compared with 61.6 percent for native-born people. Participation among foreign-born men was 76.9 percent, compared with 65.8 percent among native-born men; among women, the rates were 56.2 percent and 57.5 percent, respectively. Median usual weekly earnings for foreign-born full-time wage and salary workers were $1,059, compared with $1,236 for native-born workers. Because the October 2025 Current Population Survey was not collected during a federal government shutdown, the 2025 annual estimates use 11-month averages and are not strictly comparable with annual averages for other years.

Since 1960, foreign-born immigrant women have the lowest labor market participation rate between all of the groups in the United States. The groups include immigrant men and individuals born in the United States. Foreign-born immigrant women participate in the labor force between 75 and 78 percent lower than native born males. In terms of labor force participation, the foreign-born immigrant women from Mexico and Central America are the smallest number of participants in the labor force. As far as foreign-born immigrants that are trying to participate in the labor force but cannot find employment, the unemployment rates are as follows. The unemployment are foreign-born immigrant women workers (9.1 percent), native women workers (7.9 percent), Mexico and Central American foreign-born immigrant women workers (12.1 percent), and other foreign-born immigrant women workers (7.7 percent).

=== Foreign-born men ===
In terms of labor force participation, the foreign-born immigrant men from Mexico and Central America are the largest number of participants in the labor force. The number of potential labor force participants for foreign-born immigrant men are foreign-born immigrant men workers (9.9 percent), native men workers (10.4 percent), Mexico and Central American foreign-born immigrant men workers (11.4 percent), and other foreign-born immigrant men workers (8.6 percent). Foreign-born immigrant men have a similar unemployment rate to native workers, but the unemployment rate for foreign-born immigrant men that are from Mexico and Central America is considerably more than other groups of foreign-born immigrant men looking for work in the United States.

== International comparison ==
For 2017, the Central Intelligence Agency ranked the U.S. as having the fourth largest labor force in the world at about 160 million, behind China (807 million), India (522 million), and the European Union (235 million).

== By sector ==
Below is a chart taken from the United States Bureau of Labor Statistics. It is a list of job classifications and the annual growth rate in each category.

Industry Sector	Thousands of Jobs			Change		Percent Distribution			Compound Annual Rate of Change	
Industry Sector	2006	2016	2026	2006–16	2016–26	2006	2016	2026	2006–16	2016–26
Total(1)	148,988.2	156,063.8	167,582.3	7,075.7	11,518.5	100.0	100.0	100.0	0.5	0.7
Nonagriculture wage and salary(2)	137,190.9	144,979.3	155,724.8	7,788.4	10,745.5	92.1	92.9	92.9	0.6	0.7
Goods-producing, excluding agriculture	22,466.7	19,685.2	19,904.2	-2,781.5	219.0	15.1	12.6	11.9	-1.3	0.1
Mining	619.7	626.1	716.9	6.4	90.8	0.4	0.4	0.4	0.1	1.4
Construction	7,691.2	6,711.0	7,575.7	-980.2	864.7	5.2	4.3	4.5	-1.4	1.2
Manufacturing	14,155.8	12,348.1	11,611.7	-1,807.7	-736.4	9.5	7.9	6.9	-1.4	-0.6
Services-providing excluding special industries	114,724.2	125,294.1	135,820.6	10,569.9	10,526.5	77.0	80.3	81.0	0.9	0.8
Utilities	548.5	556.2	559.6	7.7	3.4	0.4	0.4	0.3	0.1	0.1
Wholesale trade	5,904.6	5,867.0	6,012.8	-37.6	145.8	4.0	3.8	3.6	-0.1	0.2
Retail trade	15,353.2	15,820.4	16,232.7	467.2	412.3	10.3	10.1	9.7	0.3	0.3
Transportation and warehousing	4,469.6	4,989.1	5,353.4	519.5	364.3	3.0	3.2	3.2	1.1	0.7
Information	3,037.9	2,772.3	2,824.8	-265.6	52.5	2.0	1.8	1.7	-0.9	0.2
Financial activities	8,366.6	8,284.8	8,764.6	-81.8	479.8	5.6	5.3	5.2	-0.1	0.6
Professional and business services	17,566.2	20,135.6	22,295.3	2,569.4	2,159.7	11.8	12.9	13.3	1.4	1.0
Educational services	2,900.9	3,559.7	4,066.2	658.8	506.5	1.9	2.3	2.4	2.1	1.3
Health care and social assistance	15,253.3	19,056.3	23,054.6	3,803.0	3,998.3	10.2	12.2	13.8	2.3	1.9
Leisure and hospitality	13,109.7	15,620.4	16,939.4	2,510.7	1,319.0	8.8	10.0	10.1	1.8	0.8
Other services	6,240.5	6,409.4	6,761.4	168.9	352.0	4.2	4.1	4.0	0.3	0.5
Federal government	2,732.0	2,795.0	2,739.2	63.0	-55.8	1.8	1.8	1.6	0.2	-0.2
State and local government	19,241.2	19,427.9	20,216.6	186.7	788.7	12.9	12.4	12.1	0.1	0.4
Agriculture, forestry, fishing, and hunting(3)	2,111.2	2,351.5	2,345.4	240.3	-6.1	1.4	1.5	1.4	1.1	0.0
Agriculture wage and salary	1,218.6	1,501.0	1,518.0	282.4	17.0	0.8	1.0	0.9	2.1	0.1
Agriculture self-employed	892.6	850.5	827.5	-42.1	-23.0	0.6	0.5	0.5	-0.5	-0.3
Nonagriculture self-employed	9,686.0	8,733.0	9,512.1	-953.0	779.1	6.5	5.6	5.7	-1.0	0.9

== See also ==
- Unemployment in the United States
- Workforce
- Unemployment
- Employment-to-population ratio
- List of countries by labor force
- Proletariat
- Feminization of poverty
