= Leah Boustan =

American economist

Leah Platt Boustan
- Born: United States
- Education: Princeton University; Harvard University
- Spouse: Ra'anan Boustan
- Children: 3
- Scientific career
- Fields: Economics
- Workplaces: University of California at Los Angeles, Princeton University
- Doctoral advisors: Claudia Goldin
- Website: irs.princeton.edu/people/leah-boustan

Leah Platt Boustan is an American economist who is currently a professor of economics at Yale University. Her research interests include economic history, labour economics, and urban economics.

== Education ==
Leah Platt Boustan earned a BA in Economics from Princeton University in 2000, and her PhD in 2006 from Harvard University. Her dissertation, "The Effect of Black Migration on Northern Cities and Labor Markets, 1940-1970,” won the Economic History Association's Allan Nevins Prize for the best dissertation in US economic history that year.

== Career ==
She was a professor at the University of California, Los Angeles from 2006 through 2016, when she returned to Princeton as a full professor of economics. She began a professorship at Yale in 2025. She is also a research associate at the National Bureau of Economic Research (NBER), where she co-directs the Development of the American Economy Program. She is an editor of the Journal of Urban Economics and on the editorial board of the American Economic Review.

== Research ==
Boustan has studied the Great Black Migration from the rural south during and after World War II and the mass migration from Europe to the United States in the late nineteenth and early twentieth centuries. Her book, Competition in the Promised Land: Black Migrants in Northern Cities and Labor Markets, was published by Princeton University Press in 2016. This book, building on Boustan's published papers, examines the impact of the Great Migration on employment, wages, and urban spaces in northern U.S. cities. The book shows that those who migrated earned on average much more in the North. These migrants competed for jobs with other black workers in the North, slowing wage growth for those workers. Many white households reacted to black migration with "white flight", moving to the suburbs apparently to avoid sharing public services with poorer black households. This book was awarded the Alice Hansen Jones Prize by the Economic History Association in 2018. Her research was also awarded the 2019 IZA Young Economist Award.

Boustan is among the leaders in using advanced analytical techniques to answer major questions of economic history by linking individuals and families across large datasets, such as newly digitized census records, from the 19th and 20th centuries. For example, in work with Philipp Ager and Katherine Eriksson, she linked data on the sons of slaveholders to show that these men were better off economically in the 1880 census records than the sons of nearby families with similar levels of wealth but fewer slaves in the 1860 census.

=== Selected works ===
- Abramitzky, Ran, Leah Platt Boustan, and Katherine Eriksson. "Europe's tired, poor, huddled masses: Self-selection and economic outcomes in the age of mass migration." American Economic Review 102.5 (2012): 1832-56.
- Boustan, Leah Platt. "Was postwar suburbanization “white flight”? Evidence from the black migration." The Quarterly Journal of Economics 125.1 (2010): 417-443.
- Abramitzky, Ran, Leah Platt Boustan, and Katherine Eriksson. "A nation of immigrants: Assimilation and economic outcomes in the age of mass migration." Journal of Political Economy 122.3 (2014): 467-506.
- Boustan, Leah Platt, Price V. Fishback, and Shawn Kantor. "The effect of internal migration on local labor markets: American cities during the Great Depression." Journal of Labor Economics 28.4 (2010): 719-746.
- Boustan, Leah Platt, Matthew E. Kahn, and Paul W. Rhode. "Moving to higher ground: Migration response to natural disasters in the early twentieth century." American Economic Review 102.3 (2012): 238-44.

== Writings ==
Boustan has published three books, many academic papers, and has released a handful of working papers since 2007. These works have made considerable contributions to the fields of economic history, labor economics, and urban economics.

In her book Competition in the Promised Land: Black Migrants in Northern Cities and Labor Markets (Princeton University Press, 2016) Boustan explores the migration of almost four million black individuals from the American South to urban centers in the North. In opposition to prior thought, that the Great Migration was a catalyst for black economic progress, Boustan argued that the migration restricted the convergence of black and white wages in northern cities and contributed to "white flight". In this book Boustan utilizes an innovative analysis of U.S. census data. She concludes that the migration had detrimental effects on urban areas in the north, leading to the suburbanization of whites and limited black economic progress. In her prior book, Human Capital in History, Boustan intersects important research in labor economics, history, education, and other similar fields, providing new insights into the forces that drive the accumulation of human capital.

Boustan's more recent writings deal with the migration from Europe to the United States in the 1800s, including her third book, co-authored with Ran Abramitzky, Streets of Gold: America's Untold Story of Immigrant Success. In it, Boustan and Abramitzky use data analysis techniques on large datasets to argue that children of immigrants from nearly every country, especially those of poor immigrants, demonstrate rapid assimilation and upward mobility, doing better economically than children of U.S.-born residents. They also argue that immigrants improve the economy and help the US-born, staving off negative consequences of an aging population.

She has published other papers on urbanization in the United States, segregation in American cities, income inequality, and other related topics.

== Economics work ==
Boustan's research and writings over the past decade have contributed important insights into the fields of labor and urban economics, as well as the analysis of economics history. Her work exists at the forefront of a trend in economic research towards utilizing large data sets and statistical analysis to explain historical observations in the field.

She has published many influential works that use statistical approaches to challenge traditional perspectives on economic events against large data sets. Boustan's work has uncovered major insights into historical explanations in the fields of labor and urban economics. For example, her research on the "white flight" provided statistically based answers into an ongoing debate. Economist and historians have argued over whether the large number of white individuals fleeing urban areas can be attributed to new financial opportunities in the suburbs or to increased racial tensions that came with the influx of black migrants. Boustan's statistical analysis suggests that both were major motivators of the historical event. The way she conducts her research is revolutionary in the field. Through the utilization of large data sets like the U.S. census, Boustan is able to provide explanations and analysis to economic trends in history.

She is also part of a growing movement towards increasing female participation in the economic field. Boustan has conducted research into why female participation rates in the discipline are so low and hopes her research will help attract more women to the traditionally male-dominated discipline.
