= Claudia Olivetti =

American economist

Claudia Olivetti is an Italian economist specializing in the fields of labor economics and the economics of gender and family. She is the George J. Records 1956 Professor of Economics at Dartmouth College. and a Research Associate and Co-Director (co-directing with Claudia Goldin and Jessica Goldberg) of the "Gender in the Economy" study group at the National Bureau of Economic Research. She was previously a professor of economics at Boston College and a Harvard Radcliffe Institute fellow.

Olivetti's research focuses on women in the labor market, intergenerational mobility, and marriage institutions. Her work has appeared several times in economic journals including the American Economic Review, the Quarterly Journal of Economics, and the Journal of Political Economy.

== Early life and education ==
Growing up in Italy, her mother was a homemaker. She witnessed the diversity of households through her friends, whose mothers were also either homemakers or working mothers, which inspired her to enter education, and to later focus her research on cultural substitutability.

In 1994 she received the Laurea of Statistics and Economics from the University of Rome-La Sapienza, equivalent to a Master of Science.

Olivetti earned a Masters of Arts and a PhD in Economics from the University of Pennsylvania, in 1997 and 2001 respectively. Her dissertation "Changes in women's hours of market work: The effect of changing returns to experience" explains the extent to which returns to experiences have changed, comparing data from 1970 and 1990 and assesses the consequences of this increase for married women's hours of work over the life cycle.

== Academic career ==
=== Boston University ===
In September 2001 Olivetti was appointed as an Assistant Professor for a seven-year period, at the Department of Economics at Boston University and resumed her position again from September 2008 till June 2015. Her teachings encompassed Macroeconomics (Introductory and Intermediate), as well as Topics in Labor Economics and Economic History for graduate students and Dissertation Workshops in Applied Microeconomics.

Next to her teaching activity, she also chaired and co-chaired the Ph.D. Admissions and Recruiting Committees for multiple periods and worked on the Task Force on the Future of Women's Studies, as well the Dissertation Committee for 19 students.

=== Boston College ===
Following her two appointments as Assistant Professor at Boston University, Olivetti continued as a Professor at the Department of Economics at Boston College from July 2015 to June 2019, where her teachings covered Economics of the Family as well as Labor Economics for graduate students. From 2017 to 2019 she also served on the Governing Board of the Institute for the Liberal Arts, as well as the Faculty Recruiting Committee from 2015 to 2019.

=== Harvard University ===
From 2005 to 2008 she also worked as an advanced studies fellow at Radcliffe Institute at Harvard University. Her field of research investigated the emergence and persistence of gender differences in wages and in the division of labor in households

=== National Bureau of Economic Research ===
From 2005 until 2011 she started working as a Faculty Research Fellow at the National Bureau of Economic Research, an American private non-profit research organization. Starting in October 2011, she furthered her research as a Research Associate in the field of Labor Studies and Development of the American Economy.

As a Co-Director of the Study Group Gender in the Economy Olivetti continued, starting in January 2020.

=== Dartmouth College ===
In July 2019 Olivetti was appointed as Professor in the Department of Economics at Dartmouth College, and was appointed the George J. Records 1956 Professorship in July 2020. With her new Professorships her teachings now covered Gender and Family Issues in Modern Economics as well as Data Analysis for Economic Policy: Economics of Career and Family.

Her work at Dartmouth College also includes working as a Faculty Adviser for Women's Rugby and the Sadie Alexander Association, as well as being a member on the Council on the Libraries, and being a part of the Department of Economics Diversity Committee and the Poverty Alleviation Cluster Recruiting Committee.

=== Further employment ===
As a distinguished lecturer Olivetti has held a Fed Financial Literacy Seminar in collaboration with Universities across the US, Italy, Ireland, and the United Kingdom.

For her extensive research in the field of Gender and Labour Economics she has received multiple grants from the National Science Foundation as well as the Russell Sage Foundation and from the Research Council of Norway, for which she conducted three independent research projects from the period of 2010 to 2021.

As an Advisor she has accompanied and worked as the Main Adviser or Co-Adviser for 18 doctoral thesis' and four undergraduate thesis'.

=== Professional career ===
Olivetti has worked as a referee for multiple journals of economics, political economy and human resources and research foundations, such as the National Science Foundation, the European Research Council and the Russel Sage Foundation.

She has served on the editorial boards for the European Economic Review, and Labour Economics.

She has served on multiple Program Committees for the Labour and Employment Relations Association, the Econometric Society and Society of Economic Dynamics, as well as the Society of Labor Economists, for which she was also elected for the Executive Committee.

Next to Program Committees she has also worked on the Selection Committee for three times for the Economic History Association's Alice Hansen Jones Prize.

== Awards and honors ==
Year	Fellowships	Awards and Honors
2023	European University Institute, Economics Lecture	
2022	COSME Plenary Lecture, Spanish Economic Association	
2021	Al Rees Lecture, Society of Labor Economists	
2020		AER: Insights Excellence in Refereeing Award
2017	Fellows Lecture, Society of Labor Economists, Raleigh	
2013	Keynote Speaker, Italian conference in Econometrics and Empirical Economics (ICEEE)	
2013		Certificate of Excellence in Reviewing, Labour Economics
2012		Graduate Economic Association Advisor of the Year Award, Boston University
2005-2006	Radcliffe Institute for Advanced Studies Fellowship, Harvard University	
2005		Honoree, "Legacy Gift" Program, Boston University
2002		Gitner Teaching Award, Boston University, Department of Economics
2001		Prize "Seminari Itineranti" International Association of Italian Economists (AIDEI)
2001	Sidney Weintraub Memorial Fellowship in Economics, University of Pennsylvania	
1999		Edwin Mansfield Teaching Prize in Economics, University of Pennsylvania
1998-1999	Scholarship from "Ente L. Einaudi" Foundation, Rome, Italy	
1995-1997	Scholarship "Giambattista Marchesini" from Bank of Rome, Italy	

== Academic contribution ==
=== Female Labor Force Dynamics ===
Olivetti and Fernandez et al.. found that the increase in the number of men who grew up in households with working mothers over time has played a significant role in the growth of female labor supply. Because the employment status of a mother influence her son's preferences or capabilities, which could potentially have significant implications for the working behavior of his future wife, increasing the likelihood of her employment.

=== Gender gaps ===
In 2008, Olivetti and Petrongolo argued that the negative correlation between gender wage gaps and gender employment gaps across countries was noteworthy. Additionally, they demonstrated the critical role of nonrandom selection in employment, which helped to explain the observed discrepancies in gender wage gaps between various countries. They also discovered that the median wage gaps were higher on imputed wage distributions than actual ones in most countries in the sample, indicating that women, on average, tend to be more positively selected into employment than men, as anticipated.

In a 2011 paper titled "Gender gaps across countries and skills: Supply, Demand and the industry structure", co-written with Petrongolo, she discovered "a strong, positive correlation between the unskilled-to-skilled wage gap and the corresponding hours gap across countries, thus pointing at significant (net) demand forces shaping gender differences in labor market outcomes across skills". They study's result also indicate that insufficient demand is the primary factor contributing to the unfavorable labor market outcomes for women with lower levels of skill in some of the countries included in the sample.

Olivetti and Petrongolo found in 2016 that there is evidence of gender convergence in main labor market indicators among a significant sample of high-income countries over the past several decades. Despite considerable variation in the levels of female participation across countries in the sample, there are notable similarities in female outcomes across most countries, indicating a clear trend of international convergence.

=== Family policy ===
Olivetti and Petrongolo demonstrated in 2017 that cross-country studies typically show greater positive effects on female employment for relatively brief parental leave durations compared to micro-level studies. Conversely, longer entitlements tend to have more negative effects on female employment. They also found that less skilled women tend to experience more beneficial employment and earnings impacts than high-skill women, which may have a negative impact on the latter's earnings. They concluded that there is little convincing evidence to suggest that extended parental leave rights have an overall positive effect on female outcomes. Instead, their findings indicate that early childhood spending policies in both cross-country and micro-data, as well as in-work benefits in the micro-data, have the strongest evidence for reducing gender disparities.

=== Gender Roles and Medical Progress ===
Olivetti and Albanesi, in their article "Gender Roles and Medical Progress" show that "improvements in maternal health were critical to the joint evolution of married women's participation and fertility in the United States during the twentieth century. Their analysis also indicates that a reduction in maternal mortality could result in significant economic benefits for developing economies on a larger scale.

In a 2018 paper, Olivetti and Patacchini et al.. examined "the importance of socialization during adolescence for shaping women's gender-role identity and subsequent work choices". They found that women who had more exposure to working mothers during their teenage years are more inclined to work, particularly after becoming mothers. Because the exposure to working mothers influences attitudes regarding the compatibility of motherhood and employment.

=== Returns to Experience of Women ===
In a paper titled "Changes in women's hours of market work: The role of returns to experience", she suggest that the observed change in average hours worked for married women and the alteration in the shape of their work hours and wage age profile can be attributed to the relative change in returns to experience. The study also indicated that the decrease in the gender wage gap is not accountable for the change in the shape of women's life-cycle profiles. In general, the increase in returns to experience can be explained by technological advancements that favor skilled workers. It is possible that technological progress that is advantageous to women's characteristics played a role in the relative increase in women's returns to experience.

== Publications ==
=== Journal articles ===
- 2023 'Women in the Workplace: 50 Years of Change,' with Stefani Albanesi and Barbara Petrongolo. LSE Business Review, 2023.
- 2022 'Families, Labor Markets, and Policy,' with Stefani Albanesi and Barbara Petrongolo. National Bureau of Economic Research, 2022. doi:10.3386/w30685
- 2022 'The Other Side of the Mountain: Women's Employment and Earnings over the Family Cycle,' with Claudia and Sari P. Kerr. IFS Deaton Review of Inequalities, 2022.
- 2021 'Social Norms, Labor Market Opportunities, and the Marriage Gap of Skilled Women,' with Marianne Bertrand, Patricia Cortes and Jessica Pan. Review of Economic Studies, 2021, Vol. 88 (4): 1936-78, July. doi:10.3386/w22015
- 2021 'The Dynamic of Gender Wage Differentials: Evidence from Establishment Data,' with Erling Barth and Sari Kerr. European Economic Review, 2021, Vol.134 (2): 103713, March. doi:10.3386/w23381
- 2020 'Mothers, Peers and Gender-Role Identity,' with Eleonora Patacchini & Ives Zenou. Journal of the European Economic Association, Vol. 18, No. 1 (February 2020): pp. 266–301. doi:10.1093/jeea/jvy050
- 2020 'Who married, (to) whom, and where? Trends in marriage in the United States, 1850-1940,' with M. Daniele Paserman and Laura Salisbury and E. Anna Weber, National Bureau of Economic Research, 2020. doi:10.3386/w28033
- 2018 'Three-Generation Mobility in the United States, 1850-1940: The Role of Maternal and Paternal Grandfathers,' with M. Daniele Paserman and Laura Salisbury. Explorations in Economic History, Vol. 70 (October 2018): pp. 73–90. doi:10.1016/j.eeh.2018.07.001
- 2018 'The economic consequences of family-oriented policies,' with Barbara Petrongolo. LSE Business Review, 2018.
- 2018 'Early-Life Education and Late-Life Outcomes: Exposure to Pre-School 1943-46 and Well-Being After Age 50,' with Joseph P. Ferrie, Claudia Goldin, Quentin Brummet, Karen Rolf and Elizabeth M. Horner. Trans-Atlantic Public Economics Seminar 2018, 2018
- 2017 'The Expanding Gender Earnings Gap: Evidence from the LEHD-2000 Census', with Claudia Goldin, Sari Kerr and Erling Barth. American Economic Review P&P, Vol. 107, No. 5 (May 2017): 110-114.
- 2017 'The Economic Consequences of Family Policies: Lessons From a Century of Legislation in High-Income Countries' with Barbara Petrongolo. Journal of Economic Perspective, Volume 31, No. 1 (Winter 2017): pp. 205–230.
- 2016 'The Evolution of the Gender Gap in Industrialized Countries', with Barbara Petrongolo. Annual Review of Economics, Vol. 8 (September 2016): pp. 405–434.
- 2016 'Gender Roles and Medical Progress,' with Stefania Albanesi, Journal of Political Economy, Vol.124, No.3 (June 2016):650-695. doi:10.3386/w14873
- 2016 'Gender gaps in developed economies' NBER Reporter, 24-28, 2016.
- 2015 'In the Name of the Son (and the Daughter): Intergenerational Mobility in the United States, 1850-1940,' with M. Daniele Paserman, American Economic Review, Vol. 105, No. 8 (August 2015): 1–31. doi:10.3386/w18822
- 2015 'Gender and Dynamic Agency: Theory and Evidence on the Compensation of Female Top Executives,' with Stefania Albanesi and María José Prados, Research in Labor Economics, Vol. 42 (March 2015): 1-60. ISBN 978-1-78560-141-5
- 2015 'Career women and the durability of marriage,' with Andrew F. Newman, Boston University Working Paper, 2015.
- 2015 'American Economic Association,' with M. Daniele Paserman, The American Economic Review, Vol. 105 (8), 2695-2724, 2015.
- 2014 'Gender Gaps Across Countries and Skills: Supply, Demand and the Industry Structure,' with Barbara Petrongolo, Review of Economic Dynamics, Vol.18, No.4 (October 2014): 842-859. doi:10.1016/j.red.2014.03.001
- 2014 'Maternal Health and the Baby Boom,' with Stefania Albanesi, Quantitative Economics, Vol. 5, No. 2 (July 2014): 225-269. doi:10.3386/w16146
- 2013 'Shocking Female Labor Supply: A Reassessment of the Impact of World War II on U.S. Women's Labor Supply,' with Claudia Goldin, American Economic Review P&P, Vol. 103, No. 3 (May 2013): 257-62. doi:10.3386/w18676
- 2012 'Breaking the Net: Family Structure and Street-Connected Children in Zambia,' with Francesco Strobbe & Mireille Jacobson, Journal of Development Studies, (October 2012): 1-19. doi:10.1080/00220388.2012.709619
- 2009 'Home Production, Market Production, and the Gender Wage Gap: Incentive and Expectations,' with Stefania Albanesi, Review of Economic Dynamics, Vol. 12. No.1 (January 2009): 80-197. doi:10.1016/j.red.2008.08.001
- 2008 'Unequal Pay or Unequal Employment? A Cross-Country Analysis of Gender Gaps,' with Barbara Petrongolo, Journal of Labor Economics, Vol. 26, No. 4 (October 2008): 621-654. doi:10.1086/589458
- 2008 'Gender and the Labour Market: An International Perspective and the Case of Italy,' Rivista di Politica Economica, V-VI (2008): 3-33.
- 2007 'Public Enterprises and Labor Market Performance,' with Johannes Horner & Rachel L. Ngai, International Economic Review, Vol. 48, No. 2 (May 2007): 363-384. JSTOR 4541974
- 2006 'Changes in Women's Aggregate Hours of Work: The Role of Returns to Experience,' Review of Economic Dynamics, Vol. 9, No. 4 (October 2006): 557-587. doi:10.1016/j.red.2006.06.00
- 2004 'Mothers and Sons: Preference Formation and Female Labor Force Dynamics,' with Raquel Fernandez & Alessandra Fogli, Quarterly Journal of Economics, Vol. 119, No. 4 (November 2004): 1249-1299. JSTOR 25098718
- 2004 'Preference formation and the rise of women's labor force participation: Evidence from WWII,' with Raquel Fernandez and Alessandra Fogli, National Bureau of Economic Research, 2004. doi:10.3386/w10589
- 2001 'Predictive Ability with Cointegrated Variables,' with Valentina Corradi & Norman Swanson, Journal of Econometrics, Vol. 104, No. 2 (September 2001): 315-358. doi:10.1016/S0304-4076(01)00086-0
- 1999 'Demand Dynamics with Socially Evolving Preferences,' with Roberta Aversi, Giovanni Dosi, Giorgio Fagiolo & Mara Meacci, Industrial and Corporate Change, Vol. 8, No. 2 (June 1999): 353-408. doi:10.1093/icc/8.2.353

=== Collective Volume Articles ===
- 2020 'Why Firms Offer Paid Parental Leave: An Exploratory Study,' with Claudia Goldin and Sari Kerr. In: Paid Leave for Caregiving: Issues and Answers. Washington, D.C. Brookings Institution; 2020. pp. 66–92. DOI 10.3386/w26617
- 2018 'Changes in Marriage and Divorce as Drivers of Employment and Retirement of Older Women,' with Dana Rotz. Chapter in NBER book Women Working Longer, C. Goldin and L. Katz, editors (2018). DOI 10.3386/w22738
- 2014 'The Female Labor Force and Long-Run Development: The American Experience in Comparative Perspective,' Human Capital in History: The American Record, Ed. L. Platt Boustan, C. Frydman & R.A. Margo, University of Chicago Press (2014). DOI 10.3386/w19131
- 2005 'Women in the Labour Force: How Well is Europe Doing?,' with Chris Pissarides, Pietro Garibaldi, Barbara Petrongolo, & Etienne Wasmer, European Women at Work, Ed. T. Boeri, D. Del Boca, & C. Pissarides, Oxford University Press (2005).
- 1999 'Cognitive Processes, Social Adaptation and Innovation in Consumption Patterns: From Stylized Facts to Demand Theory,' with Roberta Aversi, Giovanni Dosi, Giorgio Fagiolo & Mara Meacci, Economic Organization and Economic Knowledge, Ed. S. Dow & P. Earl (1999).
