= Shopping mall high school =

Shopping mall high school is a term used in reference to consumer-oriented secondary educational institutions offering an abundance of student choice within its program. This most often includes choice of schedule, classes, a wide variety of subject matter, subject difficulty, and extracurricular activities (sports and hobbies). Schools dubbed shopping mall high schools make such numerous and different accommodations for students in an attempt to allow students to achieve the customized, individualized education and training they desire. Shopping mall high schools offer various curricula in order to maximize holding power, graduation percentages, and customer satisfaction.

== Background ==
The concept of a shopping mall high school was first introduced in the best-selling 1985 book, The Shopping Mall High School : Winners and Losers in the Educational Marketplace by authors Arthur G. Powell, Eleanor Farrar, and David K. Cohen. The book is the second report from "A Study of High Schools," and is the successor volume to education reform leader Theodore Sizer's Horace's Compromise. Albert Shanker, former president of the American Federation of Teachers, called The Shopping Mall High School "a sobering analysis of current conditions in our secondary schools and how they got that way." In The Shopping Mall High School, the authors argue that high schools have come to resemble shopping malls in terms of variety, choice and neutrality. The book, often required reading for education majors in the 1980s and 1990s, exposed the realities of the comprehensive high school and set off a debate that would later incorporate themes about school vouchers and the marketplace.

As high school enrollment increased and diversified during the 20th century, researchers have concluded that standards became lower, resulting in the less-challenging and more-accommodating shopping mall high school style. In their book, The Failed Promise of the American High School 1890-1995, authors David Angus (education historian and professor in Education Studies at the University of Michigan) and Jeffrey E. Mirel (also a professor in Education Studies at the University of Michigan) report that by the 1950s, education aimed at the lowest common denominator become the norm in America's high schools.

Author and Professor Emeritus of Philosophy at Southwest State University, H.M. Curtler, identifies two main factors that have resulted in "the dumbing-down of high school and college curricula" and the subsequent increase in shopping mall high schools: "the major effort in the late 1940s to focus attention in the schools on the disadvantaged student in the guise of teaching what was called real-life experience," and the correlative de-emphasis on traditional literate knowledge. This approach was linked to progressive educational theories that soon spawned the "self-esteem movement" prevalent today, turning attention away from traditional educational standards to the students themselves.

== Shopping mall high schools today ==
In the 1980s, The Shopping Mall High School and similar books documented the lack of challenging content in many high school courses. Despite the current policies of mandated student testing and performance-based school funding, evidence from recent reports indicates that the problem of high school students graduating without thoroughly developing many standard intellectual skills persists. In many cases this problem results from the lack of clear state and local standards for what students are expected to learn, and the methods used to teach them. According to the National Center for Educational Achievement, "the failure of schools, school systems and states to define appropriate standards for high school courses has been a major influence in the move to Advanced Placement and IB courses."

== The mall and high school experience ==
The 1982 film Fast Times at Ridgemont High also makes a comparison of high schools to shopping malls. Its opening titles appear over scenes of a mall, which continues throughout as the main setting where students live out their adolescence.

Malls across the United States have seen a decline in business since the heyday of the 1980s. At the same time, school systems are dealing with budget cuts affecting programs for troubled teens. The two problems have joined together in a unique solution. Malls such as the Westminster Mall in Southern California houses an alternative school in mall space donated by the Simon Youth foundation. Rick Markoff, the executive vice president of the foundation, says there are 25 "mall schools" like Westminster across the U.S. and more on the way. Most students don't just attend school at the mall, they also intern and work there.

== Criticism ==
While advocates for shopping mall style schools boast inclusiveness and freedom of student choice within such programs, critics warn against catering to juvenile whims. Educator and academic critic E.D. Hirsch, Jr. refers to the trend of shopping mall high schools in his influential book Cultural Literacy, calling the American public school curriculum "cafeteria style education" that detrimentally serves to diminish "commonly shared information between generations and between young people themselves." Hirsch believes the unavoidable consequence of the shopping mall high school is a lack of shared knowledge across and within American schools resulting in harmful cultural fragmentation.

In the journal article "What High Schools Are Like," writer and Emeritus Professor of Education at the University of California, Davis, Donald Arnstine critiques the shopping mall approach:

To urge the proliferation of shopping mall high schools is to ignore the fact that learning just isn't like shopping. Presented with a wide array of goods, we can purchase what we want and carry it home in a shopping bag. But if we are presented with a wide array of knowledge, organized by others for their purposes, we cannot just acquire it and carry it home in our heads. In fact most of it disappears once we're home (that's why teachers like to give tests on Friday). Only if one assumes that learning is simply a matter of acquiring information (for how long? a week? a semester? forever?) can one believe that schools can be improved by becoming more like shopping malls.

== See also ==
- History of Education in the United States
- Secondary education in the United States
