= High school movement =

Educational movement

The high school movement is a term used in educational history literature to describe the era from 1910 to 1940 during which secondary schools as well as secondary school attendance sprouted across the United States. During the early part of the 20th century, American youth entered high schools at a rapid rate, mainly due to the building of new schools, and a shifting focus towards a "life adjustment curriculum" focused on adolescents' immediate and personal needs. In 1910 18% of 15- to 18-year-olds were enrolled in a high school; barely 9% of all American 18-year-olds graduated. By 1940, 73% of American youths were enrolled in high school and the median American youth had a high school diploma. The movement began in New England but quickly spread to the western states. According to Claudia Goldin, the states that led in the U.S. high school movement (e.g., Iowa and Nebraska) had a cohesive, homogeneous population and were more affluent, with a broad middle-class group.

The United States exceeded Europe and Russia in mass secondary education. The American system of education was characterized as open to many students, forgiving, lacking universal standards, and academic. On the other hand, the European system was closed, unforgiving, with uniform standards, and academic for some and industrial for others. Secondary schools in America were free and generally accessible, while in most of Europe they were costly and often inaccessible with difficult entrance exams. In the United States, schools were provided by small, local districts. Because decentralized decision-making systems increased competition among districts for residents in the United States, the U.S. initially moved quickly in building schools. In contrast, schools were provided by the central government as a national decision in Europe. Further, high school was designed to be the terminal degree rather than a pre-college diploma of office or skilled blue-collar workers in the United States. By 1955, 80% of United States youth had graduated from an academic high school. In this setting general skills and social mobility were emphasized, not specific training or apprenticeships. Even by the 1930s, America was virtually alone in providing secondary schools that were free and accessible; however, this accessibility was limited to white students. While in Europe the rate of those graduating from academic high schools was only 10%-20%. Most Europeans, 40%-50%, attended full-or part-time vocational training.

From the viewpoint of economics, this movement led to the increase of women’s labor force from 1930 to 1950 in the United States. Knowledge and skills women gained in high school helped them attain better jobs outside the home.

Both men and women shared in the increase in educational attained during the 20th century; however, during the beginning and end of the century women gained more than the men did. Women began this period with more education in large part because they attended and graduated from high school to a greater degree than men. Even though women had an advantage in education for most of the century, the education advantage disappeared with cohorts born in the 1910s and 1920s. This is because many men were able to attend college on the G.I. Bill. By men having this advantage over the women, the number of men in college increased and the number of women in college decreased during the middle part of the century.

The increase in educational attainment was not shared by the African American population, whose high school enrollment rates were very low, especially in the South. This is because school integration had not been achieved and there were few African American secondary schools until the 1930s. The few African American secondary schools that did exist were located in the cities and not the rural areas where the majority of the African American population lived.

Within some of the larger American cities, especially in the industrial North, high school enrollment rates were initially lower than the rest of the country. These large cities had a large inflow of European immigrants, who were not as inclined to enroll, and also there were many job opportunities for the youth, which kept them from enrolling as well.

The supply of educated Americans increased from 1900 to around 1980. The increase in educational attainment in the early part of the 20th century came primarily from grass-roots movements to build and staff public schools. There was no top-down federal government mandate. After around 1980, the supply of educated Americans slowed. The slower growth in the educated workforce in the last quarter century has been due to a slowing down in the educational attainment of those schooled in the United States, rather than to an increase in the foreign-born component of the workforce. This has been attributed by some to the widening of economic inequality since 1970, and the slowdown in the growth of educational attainment has been most extreme for those at the bottom of the income distribution, particularly for ethnic and racial minorities.
