= Claudia Goldin =

American economist (born 1946)

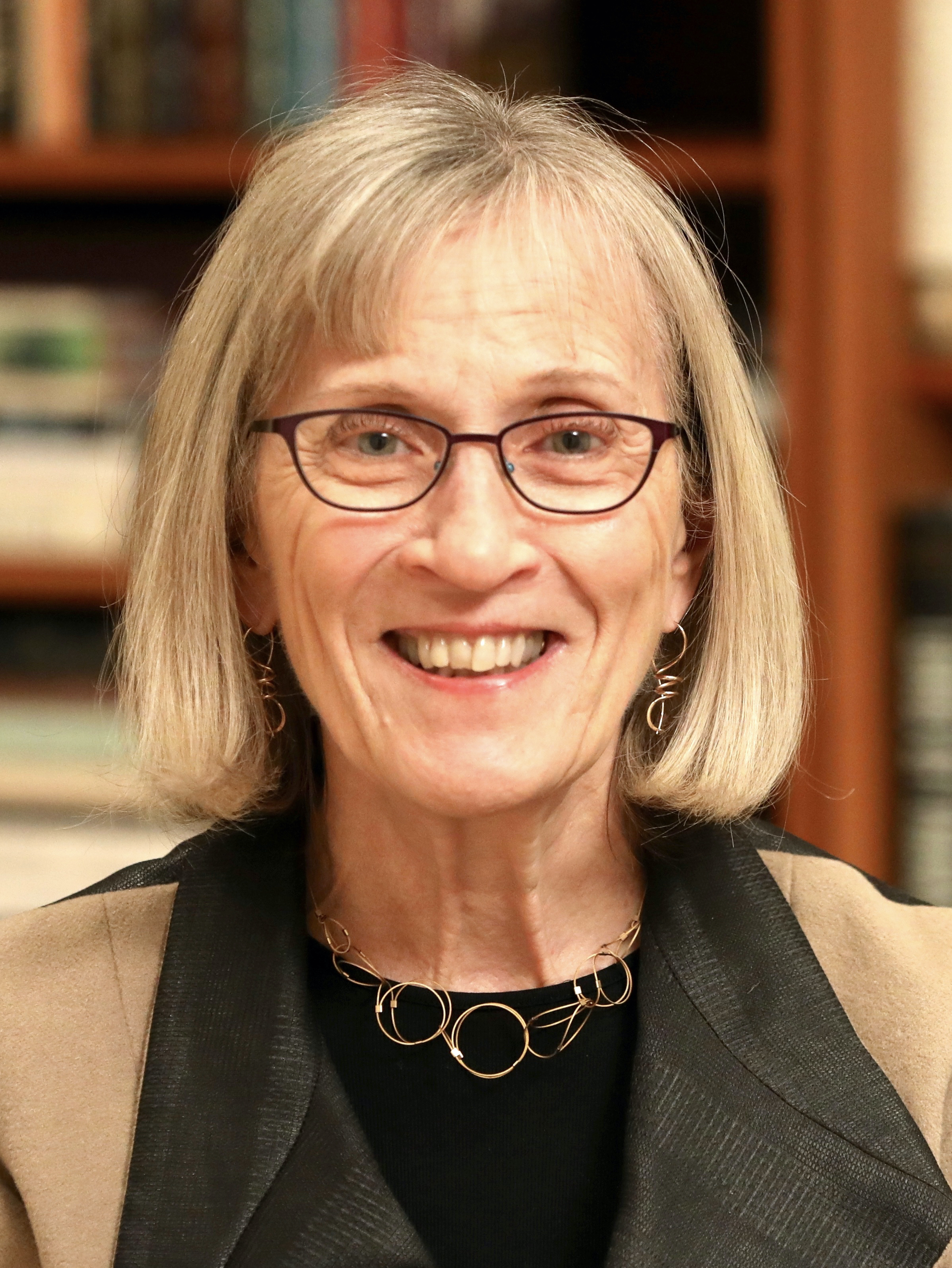
- Goldin in 2019
- Born: May 14, 1946 (age 80); The Bronx, New York City, U.S.
- Awards: IZA Prize in Labor Economics (2016); Erwin Plein Nemmers Prize in Economics (2020); Nobel Memorial Prize in Economic Sciences (2023)

Academic background
- Education: Cornell University (BA); University of Chicago (MA, PhD)
- Thesis: The Economics of Urban Slavery: 1820 to 1860 (1972)
- Doctoral advisor: Robert Fogel

Academic work
- Discipline: Labor economics; Economic history
- Institutions: Harvard University; National Bureau of Economic Research
- Doctoral students: Leah Boustan
- Website: Official website

Claudia Dale Goldin (born May 14, 1946) is an American economic historian and labor economist. She is the Henry Lee Professor of Economics at Harvard University. In October 2023, she was awarded the Nobel Memorial Prize in Economic Sciences "for having advanced our understanding of women's labor market outcomes". The third woman to win the award, she was the first woman to win the award solo.

She is a co-director (co-directing with Claudia Olivetti and Jessica Goldberg) of the National Bureau of Economic Research's (NBER) Gender in the Economy study group, and was the director of the NBER's Development of the American Economy program from 1989 to 2017.

Goldin's historical work on women and the American economy is what she is best known for. Regarding that subject, her papers that have been most influential have been those about the impact of the contraceptive pill on women's career and marriage decisions, the education of women and men together in higher education, the history of women's pursuit of career and family, women's last names after marriage as a social indicator, the reasons most undergraduates are now women, and the new life history of women's employment.

In 1990, Goldin became the first woman to be tenured in Harvard's economics department. In 2013 she was the president of the American Economic Association.

== Biography ==
=== Early life and education ===
Claudia Goldin was born in the Bronx, New York City on May 14, 1946. Her family was Jewish. Her father Leon Goldin (1918–2011) worked as a data processing manager at Burlington Industries, and her mother Lucille Rosansky Goldin (1919–2020) was the principal of Public School 105 in the Bronx. As a child, Claudia was determined to become an archaeologist, but upon reading Paul de Kruif's Microbe Hunters (1926) in junior high school, she became drawn to bacteriology. As a high school junior, she completed a summer school course in microbiology at Cornell University and after graduating from the Bronx High School of Science she entered Cornell University with the intention of studying microbiology.

In her sophomore year, Goldin took a class with Alfred Kahn, "whose utter delight in using economics to uncover hidden truths did for economics what Paul de Kruif's stories had done for microbiology". At the time, Kahn was working on airline deregulation. In 1967 she graduated from Cornell University with a BA in economics, and in 1969 she finished her master's degree in economics at the University of Chicago.

Continuing her interests working with Kahn, Goldin earned her PhD in industrial organization and labor economics from the University of Chicago in 1972. She wrote her dissertation, The Economics of Urban Slavery: 1820 to 1860, on slavery in southern antebellum cities. She began her foray into studying matters surrounding gender and inequality while looking for her true passion in research. In her autobiographical essay "The Economist as Detective", she recounts how she had overlooked the role of women even though the study of the family as a unit had been popular: "I was slighting the family member who would undergo the most profound change over the long run – the wife and mother. I neglected her because the sources had." In her essay, she advises others to do what she had done and research what they are passionate about: "You must simply crave the answers to the questions you pose."

=== Career ===
From 1971 to 1973, she was an assistant professor of economics at the University of Wisconsin. She was also an assistant professor of economics from 1973 to 1979, at Princeton University. From 1979 to 1985 she was an associate professor of economics at the University of Pennsylvania, and from 1985 to 1990 she was a professor of economics there. She joined the economics department at Harvard University in 1990, where she was in 1990 the first woman to be given tenure in that department. She was also the first female economist to be offered or achieve tenure at Princeton University and the University of Pennsylvania. In her autobiographical essay published 1998 she suggests her achievements are not of particular note because she was "too young to be a pioneer". She also mentions she doesn't recall any particularly "peculiar" memories being one of only three women in a class of 55 at the University of Chicago.

Goldin was the president of the American Economic Association in 2013 and the president of the Economic History Association in 1999/2000. She has been elected fellow of numerous organizations, including the American Academy of Political and Social Science, the Society of Labor Economists, the Econometric Society, and the American Academy of Arts and Sciences. She is a member of sections 53 (Social and Political Sciences) and 54 (Economic Sciences) of the National Academy of Sciences. She has received several honorary doctorates including from the University of Nebraska system, Lund University, the European University Institute, the University of Zurich, Dartmouth College, and the University of Rochester. She was an editor of the Journal of Economic History from 1984 to 1988.

In 2015, utilizing funding from the Alfred P. Sloan Foundation, Goldin and Tatyana Avilova initiated the Undergraduate Women in Economics (UWE) Challenge in hopes of shrinking the gender gap among undergraduate majors in economics. A randomized controlled trial was carried out for one year using twenty institutions to receive the treatment and sixty-eight others as controls to see if light-touch, low-cost interventions could increase the number of female economics majors. It was found that the treatment "may have been successful at liberal arts colleges and possibly at the larger universities that, in addition, had their own RCT [randomized controlled trial]."

For 28 years ending in 2017, Goldin was the director of the Development of the American Economy (DAE) Program at the National Bureau of Economic Research (NBER).

In 2026, she helped WNBA players negotiate a 400% increase in their salaries.

== Research ==
=== Historical trends in women's labor force participation ===
Goldin's research documents how women's labor-force participation and earnings changed during economic development. She showed that married women's participation declined as economies shifted from agriculture to industry, then rose with the expansion of the service sector, and that changing social norms concerning women's responsibilities for home and family also shaped this pattern.

In the book Understanding the Gender Gap: An Economic History of American Women (1990), she writes about the evolution of the female labor force in the United States from the late eighteenth century to the late twentieth century, focusing on the issue of gender distinction in the workplace and challenging the common previous understanding that women's employment advances were a response to social revolution rather than long-run economic progress. She demonstrates that the gender wage gap has existed for centuries and has been shaped by social norms, labor market structures, and legal restrictions. Goldin tackles the two central "women's issues" in economics today: Why has the female labor force participation rate risen so dramatically over the past half century, particularly for married women? Why has the gap between men and women's earnings been so persistent over this same period?

In her working paper "The U-Shaped Female Labor Force Function in Economic Development and Economic History" (1994) Goldin writes about how female labor force participation follows a U-shaped trend. At the beginning, a great number of women work in agriculture, but as industrialization progresses, their participation declines due to social norms and a change of the labor market into more male-dominated sectors. However, as education improves women return to the labor force, hence the U-shape. This framework helps explain historical and cross-country labor trends.

One of her most cited papers, "A Grand Gender Convergence: Its Last Chapter" (2014), underlines how making jobs more flexible would have a great impact on closing the gender gap. While some industries, like technology, science, and healthcare, have embraced more flexible work structures, these changes have been slower to take hold in fields such as corporate business, finance, and law.

Goldin's book Career and Family: Women's Century-Long Journey Toward Equity (2021) is a comprehensive synthesis of her extensive research, examining how societal norms, economic forces, and personal choices intersect and have shaped women's lives and opportunities over the past century. It traces the history of college-educated women dealing with the problem of balancing career and family throughout the twentieth century in the United States, including the impact of the COVID-19 pandemic on women's careers. In the book, Goldin challenges conventional oversimplified beliefs about the gender gap, that it's all about personal choice, free of any need for policy intervention. She adeptly argues that choices are shaped by the constraints created by society, technology, legal frameworks, and personal expectations.

Fertility decline and female autonomy

In the mid-2020s, Goldin extended her study of careers and family dynamics into an examination of why birthrates have been below replacement levels in all developed countries since the mid-1970s. In Goldin's paper, "Babies and the Macroeconomy," published in 2025, and her subsequent working papers at the National Bureau of Economic Research, "The Downside of Fertility" (2025) and " The Role of Mismatch" (2026), Goldin explores the disparity between the demographics of countries that underwent rapid economic modernization after the Second World War and those that underwent their industrial revolutions prior to the 20th century. Goldin believes that declining fertility rates result not only from increased participation of women in the workforce or the rising cost of raising children, but because social and family traditions are not changing fast enough. When women start to have control over their lives and careers, but men still follow conventional roles at home, tension build up. These conflicting ideas about what family life should be like create stress and affect decisions about having children. In Goldin’s view, this creates a situation where women who are intent on furthering their careers either put off having children or do not have children at all.

==== The role of social and technological change in women's careers ====
The article "The Power of the Pill: Oral Contraceptives and Women’s Career and Marriage Decisions" (August 2002), by Goldin and Lawrence F. Katz, highlights how access to birth control revolutionized women's economic opportunities. The pill enables women to delay marriage and childbirth, and allows them to invest in higher education and careers, therefore leading to an increasing labor force participation and professional advancement.

In the article "The Quiet Revolution That Transformed Women's Employment, Education, and Family" (May 2006), Goldin explains how access to birth control, changing aspirations, and workplace policies allowed more women to pursue careers and higher education. Goldin's research identifies a three-phase transformation in women's labor force participation throughout the 20th century, culminating in what she calls the "quiet revolution". In the early phases, few married women worked, and economic growth alone was insufficient to increase their participation. However, societal changes, for example the rise of "nice jobs" that reduced the stereotype of married women working, improved access to education, and the introduction of part-time work, also gradually made employment more attractive. By the third phase, starting in the 1960s, young women began planning careers as they were influenced by the availability of the birth control pill, observing rising divorce rates, and shifting social expectations. This shift led to increasing investment in education and career-oriented fields, and therefore contributed to reshaping the role of women in the labor market, more independent from their husbands.

=== Other notable work ===
Goldin wrote regarding the American Civil War and slavery. Notably, with the late Frank Lewis, she wrote the groundbreaking piece "The Economic Cost of the American Civil War: Estimates and Implications" (1975). In 1976 her book Urban Slavery in the American South, 1820 to 1860: A Quantitative History was published.

"The Homecoming of American College Women: The Reversal of the College Gender Gap" (2006), written by Goldin, Lawrence F. Katz, and Ilyana Kuziemko, published in the Journal of Economic Perspectives (20), gives an explanation of the societal dynamics behind the gender gap in college enrollment from the 1930s, which reached parity in the 1980s, eventually reversing.

Goldin and Katz wrote about education's interaction with technological advancement in the book The Race Between Education and Technology (2009). The book argues that technological change, education, and inequality have been involved in a kind of race. During the first eight decades of the twentieth century, the increase in educated workers was higher than the demand for them. This boosted income for most people and lowering inequality. However, the reverse has been true since about 1980. This educational slowdown was accompanied by rising inequality. The authors discuss the complex reasons for this, and what might be done to ameliorate it. This book was praised as "a monumental achievement that supplies a unified framework for interpreting how the demand and supply of human capital have shaped the distribution of earnings in the U.S. labor market over the twentieth century", and Alan Krueger of Princeton University said that it "represent[ed] the best of what economics has to offer".

Claudia and Katz also worked together in determining the value of a college education in the labor market in their 2016 paper "The Value of Postsecondary Credentials in the Labor Market: An Experimental Study".

Goldin has also worked on various other topics, including the effect of providing clean water and effective sewage systems on infant mortality, and how the stress of aging can be reduced by Japan and the United States.

Alongside coauthors Claudia Olivetti and Joseph Ferrie, Goldin has also examined the long-run labor supply effects of federally funded childcare under the Lanham Act during World War II.

== Personal life ==
Goldin is married to fellow Harvard economics professor Lawrence F. Katz. She had Golden Retrievers beginning in 1970, and her first one was named Kelso. Pika, her and her husband's Golden Retriever who died in 2024, was widely recognized for his award in competitive scenting, was trained for obedience competitions, and had been a therapy dog at a local nursing home. She often presents her ideas to her dogs out loud as part of her process in working out possible models and writing results.

== Awards ==
- 1990, 2008, 2021: Three times laureate of the Richard A. Lester Award for the Outstanding Book in Industrial Relations and Labor Economics
- 1991: Allan Sharlin Memorial Book Award from the Social Science History Association
- 2005: Carolyn Shaw Bell Award from the American Economic Association
- 2008: R.R. Hawkins Award, The Professional and Scholarly Publishing Division of the Association of American Publishers
- 2009: Jacob Mincer Award from the Society of Labor Economists
- 2009: The John R. Commons Award
- 2016: IZA Prize in Labor Economics "for her career-long work on the economic history of women in education and the labor market"
- 2019: BBVA Foundation Frontiers in Knowledge Award in the category of Economics, Finance, and Management for her contributions to gender gap analysis
- 2020: Clarivate Citation laureate in Economic Sciences
- 2020: Erwin Plein Nemmers Prize in Economics
- 2021: Society for Progress Medal
- 2022: Visionary Award from the Council for Economic Education
- 2023: Nobel Memorial Prize in Economic Sciences
- 2023: Included in BBC's 100 Women list
- 2024: One of twelve women included in Time magazine's annual Women of the Year list
- 2024: Chosen by Miriam's Cup, which as of 2024 annually "recognizes a Jewish woman of achievement."

== Selected works ==
- Avilova, Tatyana, and Claudia Goldin. "Seeking the 'Missing Women' of Economics with the Undergraduate Women in Economics Challenge." Journal of Economic Perspectives 38, no.3 (2024), pp: 137-62
- Goldin, Claudia, Claudia Olivetti and Joseph Ferrie. "Mobilizing the Manpower of Mothers: Childcare under the Lanham Act during WWII." Explorations in Economic History 97 (July 2025): 101684.
- Goldin, Claudia Dale. "Babies and the Macroeconomy." Economica 92, no. 367 (2025), pp: 675-700.
- Goldin, Claudia Dale. "Nobel Lecture: An Evolving Economic Force." American Economic Review 114, no.6 (June 2024), pp: 1515-39.
- Goldin, Claudia Dale. Understanding the Gender Gap: An Economic History of American Women. New York: Oxford University Press, 1990, ISBN 978-0-19-505077-6.
- Goldin, Claudia Dale et al. Strategic Factors in Nineteenth Century American Economic History: A Volume to Honor Robert W. Fogel. Chicago: University of Chicago Press, 1992, ISBN 978-0-226-30112-9.
- Goldin, Claudia Dale and Gary D. Libecap. Regulated Economy: A Historical Approach to Political Economy. Chicago: University of Chicago Press, 1994, ISBN 978-0-226-30110-5.
- Bordo, Michael D., Claudia Dale Goldin, and Eugene Nelson White. The Defining Moment: The Great Depression and the American Economy in the Twentieth Century. Chicago: University of Chicago Press, 1998, ISBN 978-0-226-06589-2.
- Glaeser, Edward L. and Claudia Dale Goldin. Corruption and Reform: Lessons from America's History. Chicago: University of Chicago Press, 2006, ISBN 978-0-226-29957-0.
- Goldin, Claudia Dale and Lawrence F. Katz. The Race Between Education and Technology. Cambridge, Mass.: Belknap Press of Harvard University Press, 2008, ISBN 978-0-674-02867-8.
- Goldin, Claudia and Alsan, M. "Watersheds in Child Mortality: The Role of Effective Water and Sewerage Infrastructure, 1880 to 1920", Journal of Political Economy 127(2, 2018), pp. 586–638
- Goldin, Claudia and Lawrence F. Katz. Women Working Longer: Increased Employment at Older Ages. Chicago: University of Chicago Press, 2018. ISBN 978-0-226-53250-9
- Goldin, Claudia. Career & Family: Women's Century-Long Journey toward Equity. Princeton, NJ. Princeton University Press, 2021. ISBN 978-0-691-20178-8
- "A Grand Gender Convergence: Its Last Chapter," American Economic Review 104 (April 2014), pp. 1091–119.

== Political views ==
In December 2018, Goldin commented on growing political divide by citing historical rises in unrest during periods of increased income and wealth inequality, and claims from 1894 that income taxes would begin a war between the rich and the poor.

In June 2024, 16 Nobel Prize in Economics laureates, including Goldin, signed an open letter arguing that Donald Trump's fiscal and trade policies coupled with efforts to limit the Federal Reserve's independence would reignite inflation in the United States.

In 2025, Goldin said she was concerned about the administration of Donald Trump removing and misusing government data.

== See also ==
- List of Jewish Nobel laureates

Academic offices
Preceded by Christopher A. Sims	President of the American Economic Association; 2013–2014	Succeeded by William Nordhaus
