= Visible hand (economics) =

The "visible hand" is an economic concept that describes the replacement of the regulatory function of the market mechanism by government intervention. Simply put, it refers to government intervention.

In economics, the "visible hand" is generally considered to be the macro-fiscal policy of John Keynes that emerged in the 1930s as a remedy for the shortcomings of Adam Smith's "invisible hand" and advocated government intervention in the economy, even though Smith already identified the disadvantages of the "invisible hand". Since then, economists have been building on his insights to explain when and why markets get into trouble and how the visible hand of the government can enable the invisible hand to be more effective.

In the 1930s, Keynes and other economists became clearly aware of the problems of the market economy. He called these problems "market failure" and introduced the idea of adding a "visible hand" to Smith's "invisible hand" to strengthen the regulation of the market economy. Mariana Mazzucato has argued that the "visible hand" fosters innovation.

== Background ==
The Great Depression exposed the flaws of the market economy and forced economists to change course in search of new theories and ways out, so the theory of the "visible hand" emerged after the 1930s. Keynesianism advocates replacing the "invisible hand" with the "visible hand" and replacing the "night-keeper" with the identity of the "intervener".

== Evaluations ==
Economist Mariana Mazzucato suggests that state involvement is not incidental but critical, and that "it was the visible hand of the state which made these innovations (iPhone, CPU, Siri, and so on) happen." She warned that if we waited for the "market" and business to do it alone, then these major innovations would not have come about. She also states that one of the secrets of Silicon Valley's success has been its active and visible hand.

In 2012, an article from The Economist claims that the "invisible hand" of the market is giving way to the "visible hand" of state capitalism, and that this hand is often an authoritarian one.

In 2015, an article from The Financial Times argues that markets are being dramatically reshaped and that the "visible hand" of economic policy is on the rise. The article also suggests that it is a clearly Keynesian world of muscular policy makers who have brought in deliberate distortions to improve growth and reduce volatility.

Market liberalism believes that social distribution by the "visible hand" is morally improper, regardless of its effects, because it will infringe on people's freedom.

== See also ==
- Vanishing hand
