= Ian Simpson Ross =

Scottish academic and biographer (1930–2015)

Ian Simpson Ross (9 August 1930 – 21 May 2015) was a Scottish academic and biographer of Adam Smith.

He was born in Dundee. His father worked in the jute industry and his mother was employed in service. He was educated at Blackness Primary School and was awarded a bursary to Harris Academy. In 1950 he went to the University of St Andrews to read English literature after being awarded a state grant. He was awarded a first class honours degree in 1954. He was granted a Tyndall-Bruce Scholarship at Merton College, Oxford, where he studied the Scottish poets at James VI's court under the supervision of David Nichol Smith. He was awarded a BLitt in 1956. He won a Fulbright Scholarship at the University of Texas, where he read his PhD. Under the supervision of Ernest Campbell Mossner, Ross focused on important members of the Scottish Enlightenment, and was awarded his PhD in 1960.

He was appointed Instructor at the University of British Columbia, where he taught eighteenth-century literature. In 1982 he became head of the English department and in 1993 he was appointed Professor Emeritus of English. He was also elected to a Fellowship of the Royal Society of Canada.

His first book was a biography of Lord Kames, which was published in 1972, and he also penned a study of William Dunbar (1981).

His 1995 biography of Adam Smith was the first full-scale biography since John Rae's 1895 work. It was well received and the second edition was published in 2010. Gavin Kennedy said "Ian was the doyen among Adam Smith's modern scholarly biographers. His biography will never be surpassed." In his review, William D. Grampp said Ross' "scholarship is a thing of wonder."

He visited Scotland during the 2014 independence referendum and was a supporter of Scottish independence. In 2015 he died in Vancouver, aged 84, and was survived by his wife and their five children.

== Works ==
- Lord Kames and the Scotland of His Day. Oxford: Clarendon Press. 1972. ISBN 0198223617 – via Internet Archive.
- Mossner, Ernest Campbell; Ross, Ian Simpson, eds. (1987). The Correspondence of Adam Smith (2nd ed.). Oxford: Oxford University Press. ISBN 0198285701 – via Internet Archive.
- Smith, Adam (1980). Wightman, W. P. D.; Bryce, J. C.; Ross, Ian Simpson (eds.). Essays on Philosophical Subjects with Dugald Stewart's Account of the Life and Writings of Adam Smith. Oxford: Clarendon Press. ISBN 0198281870 – via Internet Archive.
- William Dunbar. Leiden: Brill. 1981. ISBN 9004062165 – via Internet Archive.
- The Life of Adam Smith (2nd ed.). Oxford: Clarendon Press. 2010. ISBN 0199550034 – via Internet Archive.
- Ross, Ian Simpson, ed. (1998). On the Wealth of Nations: Contemporary Responses to Adam Smith. Bristol: Theommes Press. ISBN 1855065665 – via Internet Archive.
