= Adam of Balsham =

12th-century Anglo-Norman writer

Adam of Balsham (Latin: Adam Balsamiensis or Adam Parvipontanus) (c. 1100/1102 – c. 1157/1169) was an Anglo-Norman scholastic and churchman.

== Life ==
Adam was born in Balsham, near Cambridge, England. He studied with Peter Lombard at the University of Paris. He later taught in Paris, teaching John of Salisbury and William of Tyre. Further, he may have been a contemporary of Rainald of Dassel (c. 1120 – 14 August 1167) there. Gabriel Nuchelmans surmises that he may have been the first person to introduce the term enuntiabile, which came to be used in the same sense as dictum.

Many sources have surmised that Adam of Balsham and Adam, Bishop of St Asaph (or Adam the Welshman) are the same person, but Raymond Klibansky concludes that they were two different men.

The Petit-Pont attached to Adam's name and which crosses the Seine linking the west front of Notre-Dame Cathedral in Paris (and the site of a former bishop's palace) to the Left Bank St Michel area would have been the main centre of Adam's intellectual group (it was renamed in 2013 with the addition of the name of Cardinal Lustiger: 'Petit-Pont Cardinal Lustiger').

== Works ==
- Lorenzo Minio-Paluello (ed.), Twelfth Century Logic: Texts and Studies. Vol. I:Adam balsamiensis parvipontani. Ars disserendi (Dialectica Alexandri), Rome: Edizioni di Storia e Letteratura, 1956.
- De utensilibus, (or Fale tolum) on rare words.
