= Mößner =

Mössner or Mossner is a German language habitational surname. Notable people with the name include:

- Ernest Campbell Mossner (1907–1986), American academic
- Lukas Mössner (born 1984), Austrian footballer
