= Vanishing hand =

The vanishing hand theory is a concept first conceived of by economist Richard Normand Langlois. The term is an intentional play on both Adam Smith's invisible hand and Alfred Chandler's visible hand.

== Background ==
In Smith's work, his invisible hand describes the self-regulating behavior of the market. In essence, this theory states that individual personal motivations lead to the most efficient allocation of resources and greatest overall benefit, even if those motivations were not in any way benevolent. This is exemplified by relatively small firms operating with no market control. Competition between buyers and sellers channels the profit motive, causing competition to lead to socially desirable outcomes. During Smith's time and much after, this was a justification for a laissez-faire economy. However, several of the market forces that currently exist—such as large-scale industry, finance, and advertising—did not exist in Smith's time.

Chandler believed that the visible hand had replaced the invisible hand with middle management in the mid 19th century, which became "the most powerful institution in the American economy". He states that the multi-unit business structure arose because administrative coordination could yield greater profits than market coordination, giving rise to managerial hierarchy and leading to furthered growth and profit. The rise of this new system yielded the domination of major sectors of the economy and altered the structure of markets, steering away from a competitive state to an economy controlled by corporate managers. In other words, the rise of large-scale industries began to provide larger social benefits due to managerial presence and long-term scope rather than perfectly competitive markets.

== Theory ==
Langlois intended to show that Chandler's theory was partially correct but needed some reevaluation.

The vanishing hand theory, as argued by Dick Langlois:

One of my longest-running interests has been the relationship between economic change, including technological change, and the boundaries of the firm. In broad strokes, my story is this: when markets are thin and market-supporting institutions weak, technological change, especially systemic change, leads to increased vertical integration, since in such an environment centralized ownership and control may reduce “dynamic” transaction costs; but when markets are thick and market-supporting institutions well developed, technological change leads to vertical disintegration, since in that environment the benefits of specialization and the division of labor outweigh the (now relatively smaller) transaction costs of contracting. This latter scenario is what I called the Vanishing Hand. I recently ran across a new working paper by Ann Bartel, Saul Lach, and Nachum Sicherman, called “Technological Change and the Make-or-Buy Decision,” that supports the Vanishing Hand idea empirically.

In other words, the vanishing hand theory states that the visible hand is initially present as industries require managerial cooperation and vertical integration for long-term growth, but eventually fades away to a more invisible hand in which specialization allows for market forces to coordinate more, effectively leading to a quasi-Smithian division of labor. Temporary clusters of firms arose acting under Chandler's visible hand process that would eventually be replaced by Smith's division of labor and thus the invisible hand. Many of the large, vertically-integrated corporations of the past have broken up in recent years into more specialized firms due to the removal of barriers to trade, such as outsourcing. Specifically, it has once more become economically optimal to seek a division of labor, or seek vertical disintegration, rather than integrate.

As the minimum efficient scale falls, a firm's size should fall as well. This holds true when a firm's size is viewed as the amount of activity it has undertaken. It is therefore likely that, as integration becomes costlier in comparison to alternatives, large firms are more likely to disintegrate to varying degrees and have a loosened managerial presence, although a complete return to a Smithian market is unlikely.
