= Takashi Hikino =

Japanese economist (1950–2022)

Takashi Hikino (曳野 孝, Hikino Takashi; 18 October 1950 – 15 March 2022 in Osaka, Japan) is specially appointed professor at the Graduate School of Management at Kyoto University after serving as associate professor of industrial and business organization at the Graduate School of Management at Kyoto University where he taught industrial organization, business economics, and corporate strategy, and comparative management since 1998. He attended Hitotsubashi University, where he studied at the Graduate School of Sociology(B.A(1973). and M.A.(1975))

His best known work is Big Business and the Wealth of Nations (edited by Alfred D. Chandler, Jr., Franco Amatori, and Hikino, ISBN 0-521-48123-6).

He also teaches Japanese Business and Economic Development to American students at the Kyoto Consortium for Japanese Studies. Hikino is loved for his sense of humor and general sarcasm.

In a 1998 article in World Policy Journal, "What can an activist government do?", Hikino and co-author Alice Amsden contended that East Asian governments would rebound from the ongoing currency crisis, and that in order to hasten that rebound they shouldn't take to heart the advice they were getting from the western industrialized powers, because "this is what got them into trouble in the first place."

East Asian companies have developed a system that is more reliant on activist government than that of the "North Atlantic" economies, the article said.

== Publications ==
=== Books ===
- "Scale and Scope: The Dynamics of Industrial Capitalism," by Alfred D. Chandler Jr., and Takashi Hikino; Cambridge, Mass. : Belknap Press, 1990. - (Reviewed in The New Republic Dec. 10, 1990.)
  - translated into Chinese as : 规模与范围 : 工业资本主义的原动力 = Scale and scope : the dynamics of industrial capitalism / Gui mo yu fan wei : gong ye zi ben zhu yi de yuan dong li. Publisher: 华夏出版社, Beijing : hua xia chu ban she, 2006.
  - Translated into Spanish as Escala y diversificación : la dinámica del capitalismo industrial: [Zaragoza] : Prensas Universitarias de Zaragoza, 1996. ISBN 84-7733-461-7
- Staying behind, stumbling back, sneaking up, soaring ahead : late industrialization in historical perspective by Takashi Hikino; Alice H Asmden [New York] : Graduate Faculty, New School of Social Research, [1992]
- Project execution capability, organizational know-how, and conglomerate corporate growth in late industrialization, by Alice H Amsden; Takashi Hikino. Cambridge, MA : MIT Japan Program, Massachusetts Institute of Technology, [1994] OCLC: 31752593
- Chemicals and long-term economic growth : insights from the chemical industry by Ashish Arora; Ralph Landau; Nathan Rosenberg; Chemical Heritage Foundation. : New York : Wiley, 1998.
- Policies for Competitiveness: Comparing Business-Government Relations in the Golden Age of Capitalism. Edited by Hideaki Miyajima, Takeo Kikkawa, and Takashi Hikino. Oxford: Oxford University Press, 1999. Pp. xii, 344. (Reviewed in The Journal of Economic History, 62, no. 3 (2002): 885–887, and in Business history review. 74, no. 4, (2000): 776)
- Big Business and the Wealth of Nations. Edited by Alfred D. Chandler, Jr., Franco Amatori, and Takashi Hikino. Cambridge, U.K.: Cambridge University Press, 1997. xii + 596 pp. ISBN 0-521-48123-6. (reviewed in Business History Review 22-MAR-98 summary)
  - Translated into Chinese as 大企业和国民财富 = Big business and the wealth of nations /Da qi ye he guo min cai fu. Publisher: 北京大学出版社, Beijing : Beijing da xue chu ban she, 2004. ISBN 7-301-07055-1
- Inventing the electronic century : the epic story of the consumer electronics and computer industries. by Alfred D Chandler; Takashi Hikino; Andrew Von Nordenflycht. New York : Free Press, 2001
  - 2nd ed., Inventing the electronic century : the epic story of the consumer electronics and computer industries by Alfred Dupont Chandler; Takashi Hikino; Andrew Von Nordenflycht. Cambridge, Mass. : Harvard University Press, 2005. ISBN 0-674-01805-2
- The global chemical industry in the age of the petrochemical revolution by Louis Galambos; Takashi Hikino; Vera Zamagni: Cambridge; New York : Cambridge University Press, 2007 ISBN 0521871050

=== Selected articles ===
- "The Japanese Television Cartel: A Study Based on Matsushita v. Zenith" by David Schwartzman; Takashi Hikino, in Business history review. 70, no. 4, (1996): 616
- "The Fall of the U.S. Consumer Electronics Industry: An American Trade Tragedy" by Philip J Curtis; Takashi Hikino in Business history review. 70, no. 4, (1996): 616
- "The Consequences of Asia's financial Crisis - East Asia's Financial Crisis: What Can an Activist Government Do?" by Alice H Amsden; Takashi Hikino in World policy journal 15, no. 3, (1998): 43
- The Bark Is Worse Than the Bite: New WTO Law and Late Industrialization" by Alice H Amsden; Takashi Hikino. in The Annals of the American Academy of Political and Social Science, 570, no. 1 (2000): 104-114
- "Brave New Globe - Alice H Amsden and T. Hikino ask how U.S. military and economic policies mesh" by Alice H Amsden; Takashi Hikino Dissent. 48, no. 2, (2001): 53
- "Changing economic environments, evolving diversification strategies, and differing financial performance: Japan’s largest textile firms, 1970-2001" by Asli M Colpan; Takashi Hikino Industrial and Corporate Change, 14, no. 6 (2005): 897-940
