= Adam the Welshman =

Welsh theologian and Bishop

- Bishop of St Asaph
- Appointed: 1175
- Term ended: 1181
- Predecessor: Godfrey
- Successor: John I
- Previous post: Canon of Paris

Personal details
- Died: 1181 Osney Abbey
- Education: Schools of Paris

Adam the Welshman (c. 1130 – 1181) was a Welsh theologian and Bishop of St Asaph from 14 October 1175 until his death.

== Life ==
Adam was a Welsh cleric who studied in Paris and became a canon of the cathedral of Paris. After Godfrey resigned the see of St Asaph in 1175, Adam was elected to replace him. He was consecrated at Westminster by Richard, Archbishop of Canterbury.

Some earlier writers assumed Adam the Welshman and Adam of Balsham to be the same person, although Raymond Klibansky concludes that they were two different men.

In 1176, after the death of Bishop David of St Davids, Adam attempted to assert the claims of the see of St Asaph over the border church of Kerry, in a region formerly associated with Powys. This brought him into conflict with Gerald of Wales, then archdeacon of Brecknock. The dispute ended with Kerry remaining under the see of St Davids.

Adam attended royal conferences in 1177 and was present at the Third Lateran Council in 1179. He died at Osney Abbey in 1181.

== Sources ==
- Klibansky, Raymond (2004). "Adam (c.1130–1181)". Oxford Dictionary of National Biography (online ed.). Oxford University Press. (Subscription, Wikipedia Library access or UK public library membership required.)
- Lloyd, John Edward (1959). "ADAM (died 1181), bishop of St Asaph". Dictionary of Welsh Biography. National Library of Wales.
