= Chandlerian =

Chandlerian is an eponymous adjective and may refer to:

- Alfred D. Chandler, Jr. (1918–2007), professor of business history who wrote extensively about the scale and management structures of modern corporations
- Raymond Chandler (1888–1959), American novelist and screenwriter, known for hard-boiled detective fiction
