= W. P. D. Wightman =

British philosophical author

Dr William Persehouse Delisle Wightman FRSE (1899–1983) was a British philosophical author. He was President of the British Society for the History of Science.

== Life ==
Wightman was born on 4 June 1899 in Streatham Hill in London, the son of Charles Wightman, a Birmingham merchant, and his wife, Ellen Lodge. He was educated at Eastbourne College in Sussex. He then studied Sciences (specialising in Chemistry) at the University of London from 1916, graduating BSc in 1922.

In 1923 he began as Science Master at Edinburgh Academy. He gained an MSc in 1927 and PhD in 1932.

In 1934 he was elected a Fellow of the Royal Society of Edinburgh. His proposers were Sir Edmund Taylor Whittaker, Arthur Crichton Mitchell, Sir D'Arcy Wentworth Thompson, and James Pickering Kendall.

In 1951 he left Edinburgh Academy to begin lecturing on History and the Philosophy of Science at Aberdeen University.

He retired in 1968 and moved to Yarnton near Oxford. He died on 15 January 1983.

== Family ==
In 1924 he married Mildred Connold who predeceased him.

== Publications ==
- A Modern Introduction to Science (1936)
- Science in Scotland (1947)
- The Growth of Scientific Ideas (1951)
- The Emergence of General Physiology (1956)
- Science in the Renaissance (2 vols) (1962)
- The Emergence of Scientific Medicine (1971)
- Science in a Renaissance Society (1972)
- The History of Ancient Physics
- The History of Astronomy
- Smith, Adam (1980). Wightman, W. P. D.; Bryce, J. C.; Ross, Ian Simpson (eds.). Essays on Philosophical Subjects with Dugald Stewart's Account of the Life and Writings of Adam Smith. Oxford: Clarendon Press. ISBN 0198281870 – via Internet Archive.
- Science and Monism
- Science of Scotland: The Work of the Scottish Research Institutions
