= The Visible Hand =

History book by Alfred D. Chandler Jr.

The Visible Hand: The Managerial Revolution in American Business
- Author: Alfred D. Chandler Jr.
- Language: English
- Genre: history
- Publisher: Belknap Press
- Publication date: 1977
- Publication place: United States
- Pages: 608
- Awards: Pulitzer Prize for History
- ISBN: 9780674940529

The Visible Hand: The Managerial Revolution in American Business is a book by American business historian Alfred D. Chandler Jr., published by the Belknap Press imprint of Harvard University Press in 1977. Chandler argues that in the nineteenth century, Adam Smith's invisible hand was supplanted by the "visible hand" of middle management, which became "the most powerful institution in the American economy".

The Visible Hand was awarded the 1978 Pulitzer Prize for History and the Bancroft Prize of Columbia University.

== Chandler's eight propositions ==
Chandler uses eight propositions to show how and why the visible hand of management replaced what Adam Smith referred to as the invisible hand of the market forces:

1. that the US modern multi-unit business replaced small traditional enterprises, when administrative coordination permitted better profits than market coordination;
2. that a managerial hierarchy has been created for this multi-unit business enterprise;
3. that the multi-unit business enterprise appeared for the first time in history at a time when the volume of economic activities reached a level that made administrative coordination more efficient than market coordination;
4. that once a managerial hierarchy was created and successfully carried out its functions of administrative coordination, the hierarchy itself became a source of power, permanence and continued growth;
5. that the careers of salaried managers became increasingly professional and technical;
6. that the multi-unit business enterprise grew in size and diversity, and as its managers became more professional, the management of the enterprise became separated from its ownership;
7. that managers preferred policies that favored long term stability and growth of their enterprises to those that maximized current profits;
8. that as large enterprises grew and dominated major sectors of the economy, they altered the basic structure of these sectors and of the economy as a whole.

== See also ==
- Invisible hand
- Vanishing Hand
- The Managerial Revolution by James Burnham
- The Nature of the Firm
- The New Industrial State
