= Invisible hand =

Concept in modern economics

The invisible hand is a metaphor inspired by the Scottish economist and moral philosopher Adam Smith that describes the incentives which free markets sometimes create for self-interested people to accidentally act in the public interest, even when this is not something they intend. Smith originally mentioned the term in two specific, but different, economic examples. It is used once in his Theory of Moral Sentiments when discussing a hypothetical example of wealth being concentrated in the hands of one person, who wastes his wealth, but thereby employs others. More famously, it is also used once in his Wealth of Nations, when arguing that governments do not normally need to force international traders to invest in their own home country. In both cases, Adam Smith speaks of an invisible hand, never of the invisible hand.

Going far beyond the original intent of Smith's metaphor, twentieth-century economists, especially Paul Samuelson, popularized the use of the term to refer to a more general and abstract conclusion that truly free markets are self-regulating systems that always tend to create economically optimal outcomes, which in turn cannot be improved upon by government intervention. The idea of trade and market exchange perfectly channelling self-interest toward socially desirable ends is a central justification for newer versions of the laissez-faire economic philosophy which lie behind neoclassical economics.

Adam Smith was a proponent of less government intervention in his own time, and of the possible benefits of a future with more free trade both domestically and internationally. However, in a context of discussing science more generally, Smith himself once described "invisible hand" explanations as a style suitable for unscientific discussion, and he never used it to refer to any general principle of economics. His argumentation against government interventions into markets were based on specific cases, and were not absolute. Smith's invisible hand argumentation may have also been influenced by Richard Cantillon and his model of the isolated estate.

Because the modern use of this term has become a shorthand way of referring to a key neoclassical assumption, disagreements between economic ideologies are now sometimes viewed as disagreement about how well the "invisible hand" is working. For example, it is argued that tendencies that were nascent during Smith's lifetime, such as large-scale industry, finance, and advertising, have reduced the effectiveness of the supposed invisible hand.

Alternatively, it can be misused or misinterpreted as a conspiracy to use a hidden mechanism to control markets or society, or as an existing conspiracy that a powerful "invisible hand" exists.

== History of the terms and concepts ==
The term "invisible hand" has classical roots, and it was relatively widely used in 18th-century English. Adam Smith's own usage of the term did not attract much attention until many generations after his death. In his early unpublished essay on The History of Astronomy (written before 1758) he specifically described this type of explanation as a common and unscientific way of thinking. Smith wrote that superstitious people, or people with no time to think philosophically about complex chains of cause and effect, tend to explain irregular, unexpected natural phenomena such as "thunder and lightning, storms and sunshine", as acts of favour or anger performed by "gods, daemons, witches, genii, fairies". For this reason the philosophical or scientific study of nature can only begin when there is social order and security, so that people are not living in fear, and can be attentive. Because of this background, a wide range of interpretations have been given to the fact that Smith himself used the metaphor twice when discussing economic topics. On one extreme it has been argued that Smith was literally suggesting that divine intervention is at play in the economy, and at the other extreme it has been suggested that Smith's use of this metaphor shows that he was being sarcastic.

The modern conception of a free market causing the best possible economic result, which is now commonly associated with the term "invisible hand", also developed further, going beyond Smith's conception. It has been influenced by arguments for free markets found not only in Smith's works, but also by earlier writers such as especially Bernard Mandeville, and later more mathematical approaches by economists such as Pareto and Marshall.

== Adam Smith's use of the term in economics ==
=== The Wealth of Nations ===
The invisible hand is explicitly mentioned only once in the Wealth of Nations, in a specialized chapter not about free trade but about capital investment, which discusses the concern that international merchants might choose to invest in foreign countries. Smith argues that a self-interested investor will have a natural tendency to employ his capital as near home as he can, as long as the home market does not give much lower returns than other alternatives. This in turn means...

[...] every individual necessarily labours to render the annual revenue of the society as great as he can. He generally, indeed, neither intends to promote the public interest, nor knows how much he is promoting it. By preferring the support of domestic to that of foreign industry, he intends only his own security; and by directing that industry in such a manner as its produce may be of the greatest value, he intends only his own gain, and he is in this, as in many other cases, led by an invisible hand to promote an end which was no part of his intention. Nor is it always the worse for the society that it was no part of it. By pursuing his own interest he frequently promotes that of the society more effectually than when he really intends to promote it. I have never known much good done by those who affected to trade for the public good. It is an affectation, indeed, not very common among merchants, and very few words need be employed in dissuading them from it. [emphasis added]

As noted by William D. Grampp, this example involves "a particular condition that may or may not be present in a transaction on a competitive market". Essentially, the invisible hand refers to the unintended positive consequences self-interest has on the promotion of community welfare. Nevertheless, Smith draws a practical implication in this case, which is that legislators should not intervene too hastily in many (if not all) cases:

What is the species of domestic industry which his capital can employ, and of which the produce is likely to be of the greatest value, every individual, it is evident, can, in his local situation, judge much better than any statesman or lawgiver can do for him. The statesman, who should attempt to direct private people in what manner they ought to employ their capitals, would not only load himself with a most unnecessary attention, but assume an authority which could safely be trusted, not only to no single person, but to no council or senate whatever, and which would nowhere be so dangerous as in the hands of a man who had folly and presumption enough to fancy himself fit to exercise it.

According to Grampp:

The invisible hand, then, is not an autonomous force. It is self interest operating in particular circumstances. The owner of capital acts in the public interest if acting in his private interest is profitable and happens to provide a public benefit. He does not act in the public interest if acting in his own interest would be unprofitable. There are circumstances of the opposite kind, when what is in his interest is not in the public interest. They are not rare, and although they vary in importance, none is trivial.

=== The Theory of Moral Sentiments ===
Smith's first use of the invisible hand metaphor in an economic context occurs in The Theory of Moral Sentiments (1759) in Part IV, Chapter 1, where he describes a selfish landlord being led by an invisible hand to distribute his harvest to those who work for him. This passage concerns the distribution of wealth: the poor receive the "necessities of life" after the rich have gratified "their own vain and insatiable desires". It has been noted that in this passage Smith seems to equate the invisible hand to "Providence", implying a divine plan.

The proud and unfeeling landlord views his extensive fields, and without a thought for the wants of his brethren, in imagination consumes himself the whole harvest ... [Yet] the capacity of his stomach bears no proportion to the immensity of his desires... the rest he will be obliged to distribute among those, who prepare, in the nicest manner, that little which he himself makes use of, among those who fit up the palace in which this little is to be consumed, among those who provide and keep in order all the different baubles and trinkets which are employed in the economy of greatness; all of whom thus derive from his luxury and caprice, that share of the necessaries of life, which they would in vain have expected from his humanity or his justice...The rich only select from the heap what is most precious and agreeable. They consume little more than the poor, and in spite of their natural selfishness and rapacity, though they mean only their own convenience, though the sole end which they propose from the labors of all the thousands whom they employ, be the gratification of their own vain and insatiable desires, they divide with the poor the produce of all their improvements... They are led by an invisible hand to make nearly the same distribution of the necessaries of life, which would have been made, had the earth been divided into equal portions among all its inhabitants, and thus without intending it, without knowing it, advance the interest of the society, and afford means to the multiplication of the species. When Providence divided the earth among a few lordly masters, it neither forgot nor abandoned those who seemed to have been left out in the partition.

Although this passage concerns an economic topic in a broad sense, it does not concern "the invisible hand" of the free market as understood by twentieth century economists, but is instead about income distribution. There is no repeat of this argumentation in Smith's comprehensive work on economics in his later Wealth of Nations, and income distribution is not a central concern of modern neoclassical market theory. As Blaug noted in the New Palgrave Dictionary of Economics this passage "dispels the belief that Smith meant one thing and one thing only by the metaphor of 'the invisible hand'." Grampp has claimed that if there is any connection between this passage and Smith's other one, "it has not been demonstrated with evidence from what Smith actually wrote".

== The reinterpretation by modern economists ==
In contrast to Smith's own usage, the "invisible hand" today is often seen as being specifically about the benefits of voluntary transactions in a free market, and is treated as a generalizable rule. Paul Samuelson's comments in his Economics textbook in 1948 made the term popular and gave it a new meaning. The phrase was not originally commonly referred to among economists before the twentieth century. Alfred Marshall never used it in his Principles of Economics textbook and neither does William Stanley Jevons in his Theory of Political Economy. Samuelson's remark was as follows:

Even Adam Smith, the canny Scot whose monumental book, The Wealth of Nations (1776), represents the beginning of modern economics or political economy-even he was so thrilled by the recognition of an order in the economic system that he proclaimed the mystical principle of the "invisible hand": that each individual in pursuing his own selfish good was led, as if by an invisible hand, to achieve the best good of all, so that any interference with free competition by government was almost certain to be injurious. This unguarded conclusion has done almost as much harm as good in the past century and a half, especially since too often it is all that some of our leading citizens remember, 30 years later, of their college course in economics.

According to this interpretation, the Invisible Hand "principle" of Smith is that if each consumer is allowed to choose freely what to buy and each producer is allowed to choose freely what to sell and how to produce it, the market will settle on a product distribution and prices that are beneficial to all the individual members of a community, and hence to the community as a whole. The reason for this is that self-interest drives actors to beneficial behavior in a case of serendipity. Efficient methods of production are adopted to maximize profits. Low prices are charged to maximize revenue through gain in market share by undercutting competitors. Investors invest in those industries most urgently needed to maximize returns, and withdraw capital from those less efficient in creating value. All these effects take place dynamically and automatically.

Since Smith's time, this concept has been further incorporated into economic theory. Léon Walras developed a four-equation general equilibrium model that concludes that individual self-interest operating in a competitive market place produces the unique conditions under which a society's total utility is maximized. Vilfredo Pareto used an Edgeworth box contract line to illustrate a similar social optimality. Ludwig von Mises, in Human Action uses the expression "the invisible hand of Providence", referring to Marx's period, to mean evolutionary meliorism. He did not mean this as a criticism, since he held that secular reasoning leads to similar conclusions. Milton Friedman, a Nobel Memorial Prize winner in economics, called Smith's Invisible Hand "the possibility of cooperation without coercion." Kaushik Basu has called the First Welfare Theorem the Invisible Hand Theorem.

Some economists question the integrity of how the term "invisible hand" is currently used. Gavin Kennedy, Professor Emeritus at Heriot-Watt University in Edinburgh, Scotland, argues that its current use in modern economic thinking as a symbol of free market capitalism is not reconcilable with the rather modest and indeterminate manner in which it was employed by Smith. In response to Kennedy, Daniel Klein argues that reconciliation is legitimate. Moreover, even if Smith did not intend the term "invisible hand" to be used in the current manner, its serviceability as such should not be rendered ineffective. In conclusion of their exchange, Kennedy insists that Smith's intentions are of utmost importance to the current debate, which is one of Smith's association with the term "invisible hand". If the term is to be used as a symbol of liberty and economic coordination as it has been in the modern era, Kennedy argues that it should exist as a construct completely separate from Adam Smith since there is little evidence that Smith imputed any significance onto the term, much less the meanings given it at present.

The former Drummond Professor of Political Economy at Oxford, D. H. MacGregor, argued that:

The one case in which he referred to the 'invisible hand' was that in which private persons preferred the home trade to the foreign trade, and he held that such preference was in the national interest, since it replaced two domestic capitals while the foreign trade replaced only one. The argument of the two capitals was a bad one, since it is the amount of capital that matters, not its subdivision; but the invisible sanction was given to a Protectionist idea, not for defence but for employment. It is not surprising that Smith was often quoted in Parliament in support of Protection. His background, like ours today, was private enterprise; but any dogma of non-intervention by government has to make heavy weather in The Wealth of Nations.

Harvard economist Stephen Marglin argues that while the "invisible hand" is the "most enduring phrase in Smith's entire work", it is "also the most misunderstood."

Economists have taken this passage to be the first step in the cumulative effort of mainstream economics to prove that a competitive economy provides the largest possible economic pie (the so-called first welfare theorem, which demonstrates the Pareto optimality of a competitive regime). But Smith, it is evident from the context, was making a much narrower argument, namely, that the interests of businessmen in the security of their capital would lead them to invest in the domestic economy even at the sacrifice of somewhat higher returns that might be obtainable from foreign investment. . . .

David Ricardo . . . echoed Smith . . . [but] Smith's argument is at best incomplete, for it leaves out the role of foreigners' investment in the domestic economy. It would have to be shown that the gain to the British capital stock from the preference of British investors for Britain is greater than the loss to Britain from the preference of Dutch investors for the Netherlands and French investors for France."

According to Emma Rothschild, Smith was actually being ironic in his use of the term. Warren Samuels described it as "a means of relating modern high theory to Adam Smith and, as such, an interesting example in the development of language."

Proponents of liberal economics, for example Deepak Lal, regularly claim that the invisible hand allows for market efficiency through its mechanism of acting as an indicator of what the market considers important, or valuable.

== Understood as a metaphor ==
Smith uses the metaphor in the context of an argument against protectionism and government regulation of markets, but it is based on very broad principles developed by Bernard Mandeville, Bishop Butler, Lord Shaftesbury, and Francis Hutcheson. In general, the term "invisible hand" can apply to any individual action that has unplanned, unintended consequences, particularly those that arise from actions not orchestrated by a central command, and that have an observable, patterned effect on the community.

Bernard Mandeville argued that private vices are actually public benefits. In The Fable of the Bees (1714), he laments that the "bees of social virtue are buzzing in Man's bonnet": that civilized man has stigmatized his private appetites and the result is the retardation of the common good.

Bishop Butler argued that pursuing the public good was the best way of advancing one's own good since the two were necessarily identical.

Lord Shaftesbury turned the convergence of public and private good around, claiming that acting in accordance with one's self-interest produces socially beneficial results. An underlying unifying force that Shaftesbury called the "Will of Nature" maintains equilibrium, congruency, and harmony. This force, to operate freely, requires the individual pursuit of rational self-interest, and the preservation and advancement of the self.

Francis Hutcheson also accepted this convergence between public and private interest, but he attributed the mechanism, not to rational self-interest, but to personal intuition, which he called a "moral sense". Smith developed his own version of this general principle in which six psychological motives combine in each individual to produce the common good. In The Theory of Moral Sentiments, vol. II, page 316, he says, "By acting according to the dictates of our moral faculties, we necessarily pursue the most effective means for promoting the happiness of mankind."

Contrary to common misconceptions, Smith did not assert that all self-interested labour necessarily benefits society, or that all public goods are produced through self-interested labour. His proposal is merely that in a free market, people usually tend to produce goods desired by their neighbours. The tragedy of the commons is an example where self-interest tends to bring an unwanted result.

The invisible hand is traditionally understood as a concept in economics, but Robert Nozick argues in Anarchy, State and Utopia that substantively the same concept exists in a number of other areas of academic discourse under different names, notably Darwinian natural selection. In turn, Daniel Dennett argues in Darwin's Dangerous Idea that this represents a "universal acid" that may be applied to a number of seemingly disparate areas of philosophical inquiry (consciousness and free will in particular), a hypothesis known as Universal Darwinism. Positing an economy guided by this principle as ideal may amount to Social Darwinism, which is also associated with champions of laissez-faire capitalism.

=== Tawney's interpretation ===
Christian socialist R. H. Tawney saw Smith as putting a name on an older idea:

If preachers have not yet overtly identified themselves with the view of the natural man, expressed by an eighteenth-century writer in the words, trade is one thing and religion is another, they imply a not very different conclusion by their silence as to the possibility of collisions between them. The characteristic doctrine was one, in fact, which left little room for religious teaching as to economic morality, because it anticipated the theory, later epitomized by Adam Smith in his famous reference to the invisible hand, which saw in economic self-interest the operation of a providential plan... The existing order, except insofar as the short-sighted enactments of Governments interfered with it, was the natural order, and the order established by nature was the order established by God. Most educated men, in the middle of the [eighteenth] century, would have found their philosophy expressed in the lines of Pope:

Thus God and Nature formed the general frame,
And bade self-love and social be the same.

Naturally, again, such an attitude precluded a critical examination of institutions, and left as the sphere of Christian charity only those parts of life that could be reserved for philanthropy, precisely because they fell outside that larger area of normal human relations, in which the promptings of self-interest provided an all-sufficient motive and rule of conduct. (Religion and the Rise of Capitalism, pp. 191–192.)

== Criticisms ==
=== Joseph E. Stiglitz ===
The Nobel Prize-winning economist Joseph E. Stiglitz, says: "the reason that the invisible hand often seems invisible is that it is often not there." Stiglitz explains his position:

Adam Smith, the father of modern economics, is often cited as arguing for the "invisible hand" and free markets: firms, in the pursuit of profits, are led, as if by an invisible hand, to do what is best for the world. But unlike his followers, Adam Smith was aware of some of the limitations of free markets, and research since then has further clarified why free markets, by themselves, often do not lead to what is best. As I put it in my new book, Making Globalization Work, the reason that the invisible hand often seems invisible is that it is often not there. Whenever there are "externalities"—where the actions of an individual have impacts on others for which they do not pay, or for which they are not compensated—markets will not work well. Some of the important instances have long understood environmental externalities. Markets, by themselves, produce too much pollution. Markets, by themselves, also produce too little basic research. (The government was responsible for financing most of the important scientific breakthroughs, including the internet and the first telegraph line, and many bio-tech advances.) But recent research has shown that these externalities are pervasive, whenever there is imperfect information or imperfect risk markets—that is always. Government plays an important role in banking and securities regulation, and a host of other areas: some regulation is required to make markets work. Government is needed, almost all would agree, at a minimum to enforce contracts and property rights. The real debate today is about finding the right balance between the market and government (and the third "sector" – governmental non-profit organizations). Both are needed. They can each complement each other. This balance differs from time to time and place to place.

The preceding claim is based on Stiglitz's 1986 paper, "Externalities in Economies with Imperfect Information and Incomplete Markets", which describes a general methodology to deal with externalities and for calculating optimal corrective taxes in a general equilibrium context. In it he considers a model with households, firms and a government.

Households maximize a utility function $u^{h}(x^{h}, z^{h})$, where $x^{h}$ is the consumption vector and $z^{h}$ are other variables affecting the utility of the household (e.g. pollution). The budget constraint is given by $x^{h}_{1}+q \cdot \bar{x}^{h}\leq I^{h}+\sum a^{hf} \cdot \pi^{f}$, where q is a vector of prices, a^{hf} the fractional holding of household h in firm f, π^{f} the profit of firm f, I^{h} a lump sum government transfer to the household. The consumption vector can be split as $x^{h}=\left( x^{h}_{1}, \bar{x}^{h} \right)$.

Firms maximize a profit $\pi^{f}=y^{f}_{1}+p\cdot \bar{y}_{1}$, where y^{f} is a production vector and p is vector of producer prices, subject to $y^{f}_{1}-G^{f}(\bar{y}^{f}, z^{f}) \leq 0$, G_{f} a production function and z^{f} are other variables affecting the firm. The production vector can be split as $y^{f}=\left( y^{f}_{1}, \bar{y}^{f} \right)$.

The government receives a net income $R=t \cdot\bar{x}-\sum I^{h}$, where $t=(q-p)$ is a tax on the goods sold to households.

It can be shown that in general the resulting equilibrium is not efficient.

Proof
It is worth keeping in mind that an equilibrium for the model may not necessarily exist. If it exists and there are no taxes (I^{h}=0, ∀h), then demand equals supply, and the equilibrium is found by:

$\sum \bar{x} ^{h} (q,I,z) - \sum \bar{y}^{f}(p,z)=\bar{ x } (q,I,z) - \sum \bar{y}^{f}(p,z)=0$

Let us use $\frac{\partial E^{h}}{\partial q}=E^{h}_{q}$ as a simplifying notation, where $E^{h}\left( q, z^{h}, u^{h} \right)$ is the expenditure function that allows the minimization of household expenditure for a certain level of utility. If there is a set of taxes, subsidies, and lump sum transfers that leaves household utilities unchanged and increase government revenues, then the above equilibrium is not Pareto optimal. On the other hand, if the above non taxed equilibrium is Pareto optimal, then the following maximization problem has a solution for t=0:

$$\begin{align}
&\underset{t,I}{\operatorname{maximize}}& & R = t \cdot \bar{ x } - \sum I^{h} \\
&\operatorname{subject\;to}
& & I^{h}+\sum a^{hf} \pi ^{f} =E^{h} (q,z^{h}; \bar{u}^{h}) \\
\end{align}$$

This is a necessary condition for Pareto optimality. Taking the derivative of the constraint with respect to t yields:

$\frac{dI^{h}}{dt}+\sum a^{hf}\left( \pi^{f}_{z} \frac{dz^{f}}{dt}+\pi^{f}_{P} \frac{dp}{dt} \right)=E^{h}_{q} \frac{dq}{dt}+E^{h}_{z} \frac{dz^{h}}{dt}$

Where $\pi^{f}_{z}=\frac{\partial \pi^{f}_{*}}{\partial z^{f}}$ and $\pi^{f}_{*}(p,z^{f})$ is the firm's maximum profit function. But since q=t+p, we have that dq/dt=I_{N-1}+dp/dt. Therefore, substituting dq/dt in the equation above and rearranging terms gives:

$E^{h}_{q}+\left( E^{h}_{q} - \sum a^{hf} \pi^{f}_{P} \right)\frac{dp}{dt}=\frac{dI^{h}}{dt}+\left\{ \sum a^{hf} \pi^{f}_{z} \frac{dz^{f}}{dt} -E^{h}_{z} \frac{dz^{h}}{dt} \right\}$

Summing over all households and keeping in mind that $\sum a^{hf}=1$ yields:

$\sum E^{h}_{q}+\left(\sum E^{h}_{q} - \sum \pi^{f}_{P} \right)\frac{dp}{dt}=\sum \frac{dI^{h}}{dt}+\left\{\sum \pi^{f}_{z} \frac{dz^{f}}{dt} -\sum E^{h}_{z} \frac{dz^{h}}{dt} \right\}$

By the envelope theorem we have:

$\widehat{ x }^{h}_{k}(q;z^{h},u^{h}) = \left. \frac{\partial E^{h}}{\partial q}\right|_{z^{h},u^{h}}$

$\left. \frac{\partial \pi^{f}_{*}}{\partial p_{k_{1}}}\right|_{z^{f}}=y^{f}_{k}$;∀k

This allows the constraint to be rewritten as:

$\bar{x} + \left( \bar{ x } - \bar{ y } \right)\frac{dp}{dt}=\sum\frac{dI^{h}}{dt}+\left( \sum\pi^{f}_{z}\frac{dz^{f}}{dt} - \sum E^{h}_{z} \frac{dz^{h}}{dt} \right)$

Since $\bar{x}=\bar{y}$:

$\sum \frac{dI^{h}}{dt}= \bar{ x } - \left( \sum \pi^{f}_{z} \frac{dz^{f}}{dt} - \sum E^{h}_{z} \frac{dz^{h}}{dt} \right)$

Differentiating the objective function of the maximization problem gives:

$\frac{dR}{dt}= \bar{ x } + \frac{d\bar{x}}{dt} \cdot t - \sum \frac{dI^{h}}{dt}$

Substituting $\sum \frac{dI^{h}}{dt}$ from the former equation in to latter equation results in:

$\frac{dR}{dt}= \frac{d\bar{x}}{dt} \cdot t +(\sum \pi ^{f}_{z} \frac{dz^{f}}{dt} - \sum E^{h}_{z} \frac{dz^{h}}{dt}) =\frac{d\bar{x}}{dt} \cdot t +(\Pi^{t} - B^{t})$

Recall that for the maximization problem to have a solution a t=0:

$\frac{dR}{dt} = \left( \Pi^{t} - B^{t} \right) = 0$

In conclusion, for the equilibrium to be Pareto optimal dR/dt must be zero. Except for the special case where Π and B are equal, in general the equilibrium will not be Pareto optimal, therefore inefficient.

=== Noam Chomsky ===
Noam Chomsky suggests that Smith (and more specifically David Ricardo) sometimes used the phrase to refer to a "home bias" for investing domestically in opposition to offshore outsourcing production and neoliberalism.

Rather interestingly, these issues were foreseen by the great founders of modern economics, Adam Smith for example. He recognized and discussed what would happen to Britain if the masters adhered to the rules of sound economics – what's now called neoliberalism. He warned that if British manufacturers, merchants, and investors turned abroad, they might profit but England would suffer. However, he felt that this wouldn't happen because the masters would be guided by a home bias. So as if by an invisible hand England would be spared the ravages of economic rationality. That passage is pretty hard to miss. It's the only occurrence of the famous phrase "invisible hand" in Wealth of Nations, namely in a critique of what we call neoliberalism.

=== Stephen LeRoy ===
Stephen LeRoy, professor emeritus at the University of California, Santa Barbara, and a visiting scholar at the Federal Reserve Bank of San Francisco, offered a critique of the Invisible Hand, writing that "The single most important proposition in economic theory, first stated by Adam Smith, is that competitive markets do a good job allocating resources. (...) The financial crisis has spurred a debate about the proper balance between markets and government and prompted some scholars to question whether the conditions assumed by Smith...are accurate for modern economies.

=== John D. Bishop ===
John D. Bishop, a professor who worked at Trent University, Peterborough, indicates that the invisible hand might be applied differently to merchants and manufacturers from how it is applied with society. He wrote an article in 1995 titled "Adam Smith's Invisible Hand Argument", in which he suggests that Smith might be contradicting himself with the "Invisible Hand". He offers various critiques of the "Invisible Hand", and he writes that "the interest of business people are in fundamental conflict with the interest of society as a whole, and that business people pursue their personal goal at the expense of the public good". Thus, Bishop indicates that the "business people" are in conflict with society over the same interests and that Adam Smith might be contradicting himself. According to Bishop, he also gives the impression that in Smith's book 'The Wealth of Nations,' there's a close saying that "the interest of merchants and manufacturers were fundamentally opposed of society in general, and they had an inherent tendency to deceive and oppress society while pursuing their own interests." Bishop also states that the "invisible hand argument applies only to investing capital in one's own country for a maximum profit." In other words, he suggests that the invisible hand applies to only the merchants and manufacturers and that they're not the invisible force that moves the economy. He contends the argument "does not apply to the pursuit of self-interest (...) in any area outside of economic activities".

=== Thomas Piketty ===
French economist Thomas Piketty notes that although the Invisible Hand does exist and thus that economic imbalances correct themselves over time, those economic imbalances may lead to an extended unoptimal utility, which could be solved thanks to non-commercial processes. He takes for instance the cases of real estate of which imbalances may last decades, and of the Great Famine of Ireland, which could have been avoided by shipments of food from Great Britain to areas in crisis without waiting for new bread producers to come.

== See also ==
- Emergence
- Enlightened self-interest
- Free price system
- Greed is good
- Laissez-faire
- Market fundamentalism
- Order of the Occult Hand
- Rational egoism
- Self-licensing
- The Visible Hand: The Managerial Revolution in American Business
- Vanishing Hand
- The Use of Knowledge in Society

== Bibliography ==
- Basu, Kaushik (2010). Beyond the Invisible Hand: Groundwork for a New Economics. Princeton, NJ: Princeton University Press. ISBN 978-0-691-13716-2.
- Kennedy, Gavin (2017), An Authentic Account of Adam Smith, doi:10.1007/978-3-319-63802-7, ISBN 978-3-319-63801-0
- Blaug, Mark (2008), "Invisible Hand", in Durlauf; Blume (eds.), The New Palgrave Dictionary of Economics, doi:10.1007/978-1-349-58802-2, ISBN 978-1-349-58804-6
- Grampp, William D. (June 2000). "What Did Smith Mean by the Invisible Hand?". Journal of Political Economy. 108 (3). University of Chicago Press: 441–465. doi:10.1086/262125. S2CID 154797179.
- Oslington, Paul (2012). "God and the Market: Adam Smith's Invisible Hand". Journal of Business Ethics. 108 (4): 429–438. doi:10.1007/s10551-011-1099-z. JSTOR 23259382.
- Rothschild, Emma (1994). "Adam Smith and the Invisible Hand". The American Economic Review. 84 (2): 319–322. JSTOR 2117851.
- Samuels, Warren J., ed. (2011). Erasing the Invisible Hand: Essays on an Elusive and Misused Concept in Economics. Cambridge: Cambridge University Press. ISBN 978-0-521-51725-6.
