= William D. Grampp =

American economist (1914–2019)

William D. Grampp (August 22, 1914 – August 30, 2019) was an American economist.

== Academic career ==
In 1944 he was awarded his PhD in economics from the University of Chicago. His dissertation was titled “Mercantilism and Laissez Faire in American Political Discussion”. He worked as a journalist before joining the University of Illinois Chicago, where he taught from 1947 to 1980. In 1980 he became professor emeritus and also a visiting professor of social science at the University of Chicago. In 1983 he was named the first Reynolds Professor of Economics at Wake Forest University. In 1994 he was appointed lecturer at the University of Chicago Law School.

He analysed economic liberalism in a two-volume work published in 1965. He argued that economic liberalism was not synonymous with laissez-faire; in British classical liberal thought the "government may do whatever it can do that the people will have it do", whereas the utilitarian liberal believed that the "government may do whatever it can do that people have it do or can be made to believe it should do". Grampp also asserted that the impact of utilitarianism transformed classical liberalism into modern liberalism, such as that seen in 1960s America.

In his 1989 work, Pricing the Priceless: Art, Artists and Economics, Grampp adhered to the rational choice theory to explain behavior.

== Works ==
=== Books ===
- The Manchester School of Economics. Stanford and London: Stanford University Press and Oxford University Press. 1960 – via Internet Archive.
- Economic Liberalism. Vol. I: The Beginnings. New York: Random House. 1965 – via Internet Archive.
- Economic Liberalism, Volume II: The Classical View (New York: Random House, 1965).
- Pricing the Priceless: Art, Artists and Economists. New York: Basic Books. 1989. ISBN 0465063217 – via Internet Archive.

=== Articles ===
- ‘Everyman His Own Jeffersonian’, The Sewanee Review, Vol. 52, No. 1 (Winter, 1944), pp. 118–126.
- ‘The Third Century of Mercantilism’, Southern Economic Journal, Vol. 10, No. 4 (Apr., 1944), pp. 292–302.
- ‘John Taylor: Economist of Southern Agrarianism’, Southern Economic Journal, Vol. 11, No. 3 (Jan., 1945), pp. 255–268.
- ‘A Re-Examination of Jeffersonian Economics’, Southern Economic Journal, Vol. 12, No. 3 (Jan., 1946), pp. 263–282.
- ‘The Italian Lira, 1938-45’, Journal of Political Economy, Vol. 54, No. 4 (Aug., 1946), pp. 309–333.
- ‘The Grammar of Reconstruction’, The Antioch Review, Vol. 6, No. 3 (Autumn, 1946), pp. 341–353.
- ‘The Political Economy of Poor Richard’, Journal of Political Economy, Vol. 55, No. 2 (Apr., 1947), pp. 132–141.
- ‘Some Problems for Planners’, The Antioch Review, Vol. 7, No. 3 (Autumn, 1947), pp. 451–452.
- ‘Adam Smith and the Economic Man’, Journal of Political Economy, Vol. 56, No. 4 (Aug., 1948), pp. 315–336.
- ‘On the Politics of the Classical Economists’, The Quarterly Journal of Economics, Vol. 62, No. 5 (Nov., 1948), pp. 714–747.
- ‘Some Effects of Rent Control’, Southern Economic Journal, Vol. 16, No. 4 (Apr., 1950), pp. 425–447.
- ‘Autobiography of an Economic Man’, The Antioch Review, Vol. 10, No. 3 (Autumn, 1950), pp. 359–366.
- ‘The Moral Hero and the Economic Man’, Ethics, Vol. 61, No. 2 (Jan., 1951), pp. 136–150.
- ‘The Economics of "Yes, But"’, The Antioch Review, Vol. 11, No. 1 (Spring, 1951), pp. 85-94.
- ‘Discussion’, The American Economic Review, Vol. 41, No. 2, Papers and Proceedings of the Sixty-third Annual Meeting of the American Economic Association (May, 1951), pp. 583–585.
- ‘The Liberal Elements in English Mercantilism’, The Quarterly Journal of Economics, Vol. 66, No. 4 (Nov., 1952), pp. 465–501.
- ‘A Standard of Occupational Equivalence for Academic Salaries’, Bulletin of the American Association of University Professors, Vol. 40, No. 1 (Spring, 1954), pp. 18–35.
- ‘Malthus on Money Wages and Welfare’, The American Economic Review, Vol. 46, No. 5 (Dec., 1956), pp. 924–936.
- ‘International Politics and Dollar Policy’, Challenge, Vol. 13, No. 3 (FEB. 1965), pp. 20–23, 34.
- ‘On the History of Thought and Policy’, The American Economic Review, Vol. 55, No. 1/2 (Mar. 1, 1965), pp. 128–135.
- ‘On Manufacturing and Development’, Economic Development and Cultural Change, Vol. 18, No. 3 (Apr., 1970), pp. 451–463.
- ‘Robbins on the History of Development Theory’, Economic Development and Cultural Change, Vol. 20, No. 3 (Apr., 1972), pp. 539–553.
- ‘Scots, Jews, and Subversives Among the Dismal Scientists’, The Journal of Economic History, Vol. 36, No. 3 (Sep., 1976), pp. 543–571.
- ‘A Sketch of Prescriptive Government’, Journal of Economic Issues, Vol. 11, No. 1 (Mar., 1977), pp. 73–81.
- ‘The Economists and the Combination Laws’, The Quarterly Journal of Economics, Vol. 93, No. 4 (Nov., 1979), pp. 501–522.
- ‘The Classical Economics of the Pre-Classical Economists’, Eastern Economic Journal, Vol. 7, No. 2 (Apr., 1981), pp. 125–131.
- ‘Economists and Politicians: Some Cautionary History’, Review of Social Economy, Vol. 40, No. 1 (April, 1982), pp. 13–29.
- ‘Britain and Free Trade: In Whose Interest?’, Public Choice, Vol. 55, No. 3 (1987), pp. 245–256.
- ‘How Britain Turned to Free Trade’, The Business History Review, Vol. 61, No. 1 (Spring, 1987), pp. 86–112.
- ‘Rent-Seeking in Arts Policy’, Public Choice, Vol. 60, No. 2 (1989), pp. 113–121.
- ‘Introductory Remarks to 'Are Museums Betraying the Public's Trust?'’, Journal of Cultural Economics, Vol. 19, No. 1 (1995), pp. 69–70.
- ‘What Did Smith Mean by the Invisible Hand?’, Journal of Political Economy, Vol. 108, No. 3 (June 2000), pp. 441–465.
