= Alfred D. Chandler Jr. =

American historian

- Born: September 15, 1918; Guyencourt, Delaware, US
- Died: May 9, 2007 (aged 88); Cambridge, Massachusetts, US
- Education: Harvard University (BA, MA, PhD)
- Awards: Bancroft Prize (1978); Pulitzer Prize for History (1978)
- Scientific career
- Fields: Business history
- Workplaces: Harvard University; Massachusetts Institute of Technology; Johns Hopkins University
- Doctoral advisor: Frederick Merk

Alfred DuPont Chandler Jr. (September 15, 1918 – May 9, 2007) was a professor of business history at Harvard Business School and Johns Hopkins University, who wrote extensively about the scale and the management structures of modern corporations. His works redefined business and economic history of industrialization. He received the Pulitzer Prize for History for The Visible Hand: The Managerial Revolution in American Business (1977). He was a member of both the American Academy of Arts and Sciences and the American Philosophical Society. He has been called "the doyen of American business historians".

== Family and life ==
Chandler was the great-grandson of Henry Varnum Poor. "Du Pont" was apparently a family name given to his grandfather because his great-grandmother was raised by the Du Pont family, and there are other connections as well.

Chandler graduated from Phillips Exeter Academy in 1936 and Harvard College in 1940. After naval service in World War II, he returned to Harvard, finished his M.A. in 1946, and earned his doctorate in 1952 under the direction of Frederick Merk. He taught at M.I.T. and Johns Hopkins University before arriving at Harvard Business School in 1970.

== Publications ==
Chandler used the papers of his ancestor Henry Varnum Poor, a leading analyst of the railroad industry, the publisher of the American Railroad Journal, and a founder of Standard & Poor's, as a basis for his Ph.D. thesis. Chandler began looking at large-scale enterprises in the early 1950s when he assisted a team of researchers that supported Alfred P. Sloan's production of his long delayed book My Years with General Motors (1964). Chandler's book Strategy and Structure: Chapters in the History of the Industrial Enterprise (1962) examined the organization of E.I. du Pont de Nemours and Company, Standard Oil of New Jersey, General Motors, and Sears, Roebuck and Co. He found that managerial organization developed in response to the corporation's business strategy. The book was voted the eleventh most influential management book of the 20th century in a poll of the Fellows of the Academy of Management.

Chandler, with Stephen Salsbury, his co-author, provided a detailed study of re-organisation of top-level management at Du Pont and General Motors in their biography of its instigator, Pierre S. Du Pont and the making of the Modern Industrial Corporation (1971). Chandler and Salsbury explained how the inventory crises of 1920–21 at both companies prompted radical structural change that resulted in the pioneering reformation of both companies that later would be identify them as America's first multi-divisional corporations.

This emphasis on the importance of a cadre of managers to organize and run large corporations was expanded into a "managerial revolution" in The Visible Hand: The Managerial Revolution in American Business (1977), for which he received a Pulitzer Prize. He pursued that book's themes further in Scale and Scope: The Dynamics of Industrial Capitalism, (1990) and co-edited an anthology on the same themes, with Franco Amatori and Takashi Hikino, Big Business and the Wealth of Nations (1997).

== The Visible Hand ==
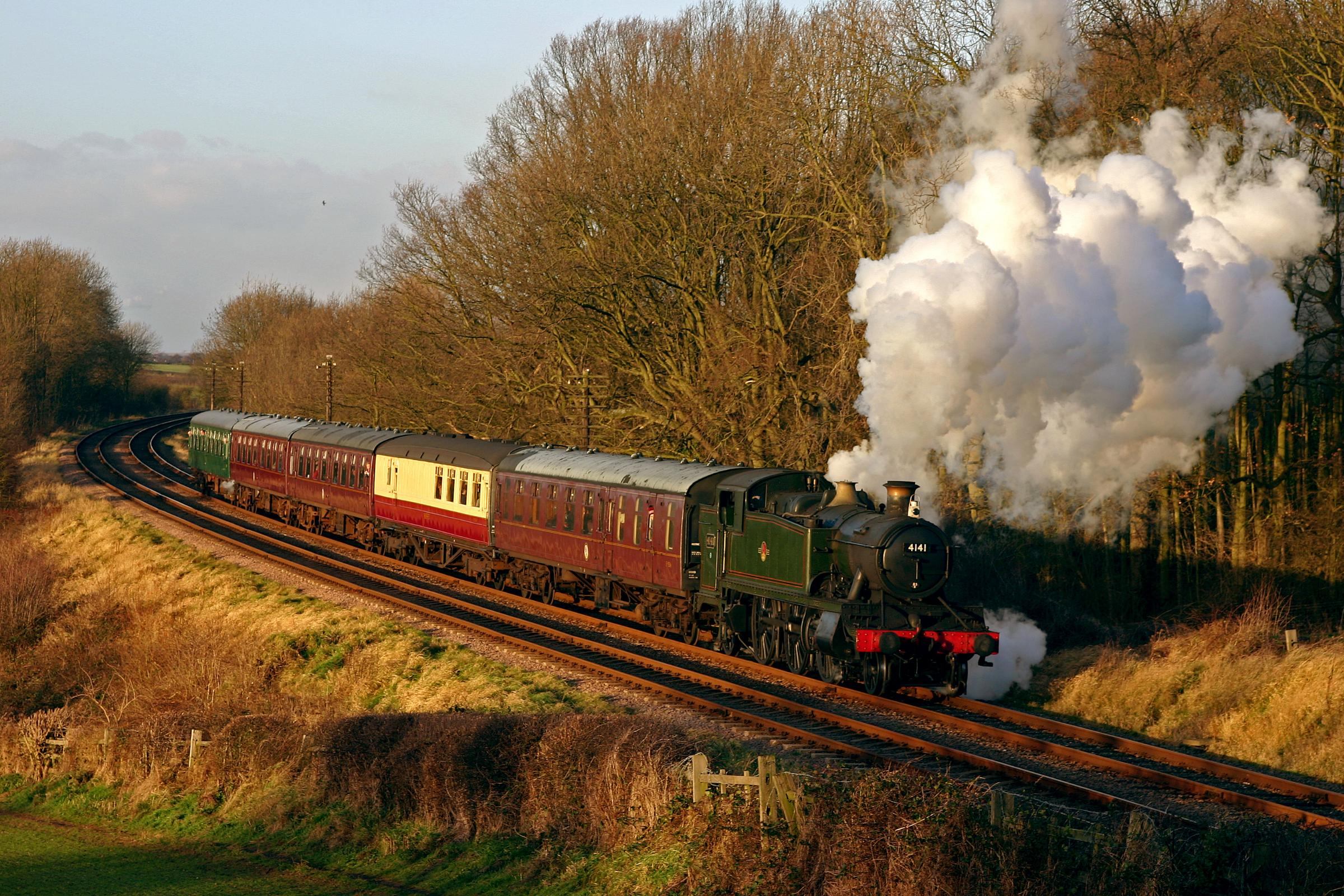
The distribution created by the railroad was one of the many contributing factors into Chandler's Second Industrial Revolution.

Chandler's most highly regarded work was The Visible Hand: The Managerial Revolution in American Business (1977). When he wrote it, the American business world was under the assumption that the economy followed a laissez-faire model, meaning the market was controlled by larger economic forces and did not require governmental intervention but that businesses and consumers would operate out of self-interest. Whenever there was a need, Adam Smith believed that an entrepreneur would both identify this need and seek to fulfill it at a price reasonable to the consumer. While some business professionals interpreted Smith's logic to understand the economy from a wholistic point of view, many others understood it quite literally as they saw it as a need for several entrepreneurs to create businesses of their own in order to fulfill different needs presented by the market. This ultimately prompted the beginning of the small business era which consisted of a multitude of "mom-and-pop" shops opening up nationwide, each meeting a different need presented by society.

Instead of replacing this economic analysis, Chandler sought to extend it—arguing that managerial firms evolved to take advantage of productive techniques available after the rail network was in place. As a result of the 2nd Industrial Revolution, technology was causing business processes to increase in efficiency which allowed firms to expand into several functional areas at a time. For example, railroad companies used to primarily fulfill the need of transportation by laying down tracks in specific regions of the country. Once inventions such as the assembly line, steam power, and the telegraph emerged, the supply for railroads finally met its demand and the industry boomed financially as operations were optimized. This led to a surge in both horizontal and vertical integration as railroad companies were granted the ability to expand both on a financial and operational level. Instead of a need that revolved around goods and services from the consumer's end, there was a massive need for coordination and systemization from the corporation's end now that the complexity of these larger firms began to increase. The "managerial class" in America emerged as firms learned to coordinate the increasingly complex and interdependent system. According to Steven Usselman, this ability to achieve efficiency through coordination explained the high levels of concentration in modern American industry. In a similar fashion to laissez-faire, businesses saw a need and sought to fulfill it, thus creating the modern corporation. While this ended up driving many "mom-and-pop" storefronts to bankruptcy, it ultimately grew the economy of the United States by creating greater wealth and opportunity for millions of Americans today. Chandler has never argued that the management evolution brought the storm of multifunctional corporations to existence (that was technology); however, it did open the floodgates as it optimized the integrations that were necessary in order for America to grow.

== Influence ==
Alfred Chandler has drawn many fans over the past century due to his accomplished work that eventually led to the genesis of the topic of business history. Along with the thousands of business historians that would not be employed without his work, there are several critics who seek to extend Chandler's arguments, and some who would rather replace it.

Much like Chandler himself, historians such as Wallace Williams and Milorad Novicevic are noticing another case of evolution that is taking place in modern business America, (refs required) one that is founded upon a need for systemization that results in globalization. Due to recent information technological advances such as the internet and cloud networking, corporations have the capacity to expand even further into regions and areas unknown, thus concentrating the economy more than before. As a result of Chandler's findings, we are in a much better situation now that we possess knowledge and documentation of what used to be the business realm, in order to predict what is yet to come.

In sociology, prior to Chandler's research, some sociologists assumed there were no differences between governmental, corporate, and non-profit organizations. Chandler's focus on corporations clearly demonstrated that there were differences, and this thesis has influenced organizational sociologists' work since the late 1970s. It also motivated sociologists to investigate and critique Chandler's work more closely, turning up instances in which Chandler assumed American corporations acted for reasons of efficiency, when they actually operated in a context of politics or conflict.

== See also ==
- Business history
- Invisible hand
- James Burnham
- Pierre S. du Pont
- Second Industrial Revolution

== Bibliography ==
- Chandler, Alfred D. Jr., 1956, Henry Varnum Poor: Business Editor, Analyst, and Reformer (Harvard University Press).
- Chandler, Alfred D. Jr., "The Beginnings of 'Big Business' in American Industry" The Business History Review 33#1 (1959): 1-31. JSTOR
- Chandler, Alfred D. Jr., 1962, Strategy and Structure: Chapters in the History of the American Industrial Enterprise (MIT Press).
- Chandler, Alfred D. Jr., ed. 1964, Giant Enterprise: Ford, General Motors, and the Automobile Industry. Sources and Readings (Harcourt, Brace & World).
- Chandler, Alfred D. Jr., "The Railroads: Pioneers in Modern Corporate Management" The Business History Review 39#1 (1965): 16–40. JSTOR
- Chandler, Alfred D. Jr., "The Structure of American Industry in the Twentieth Century: A Historical Overview" The Business History Review 43#3 (1969): 255–298. JSTOR
- Chandler, Alfred D. Jr. and Stephen Salsbury, 1971, Pierre S. Du Pont and the Making of the Modern Industrial Corporation (Harper & Row).
- Chandler, Alfred D. Jr., "Anthracite Coal and the Beginnings of the Industrial Revolution in the United States" The Business History Review 46#2 (1972): 141–181. JSTOR
- Chandler, Alfred D. Jr., 1977, The Visible Hand: The Managerial Revolution in American Business (The Belknap Press of Harvard University Press).
- Chandler, Alfred D. Jr. and Herman Daems, eds. 1980, Managerial Hierarchies: Comparative Perspectives on the Rise of the Modern Industrial Enterprise (Harvard University Press).
- Chandler, Alfred D. Jr., "The Emergence of Managerial Capitalism" The Business History Review 58#4 (1984): 473–503. JSTOR
- Chandler, Alfred D. Jr. and Richard S. Tedlow, eds. 1985, The Coming of Managerial Capitalism: A Casebook on the History of American Economic Institutions (R. D. Irwin).
- Chandler, Alfred D. Jr., with the assistance of Takashi Hikino, 1990, Scale and Scope: The Dynamics of Industrial Capitalism (The Belknap Press of Harvard University Press).
- Chandler, Alfred D. Jr., "What is a firm?: A historical perspective" European Economic Review 36#2 (1992): 483–492.
- Chandler, Alfred D. Jr., Franco Amatori and Takashi Hikino, eds. 1997, Big Business and the Wealth of Nations (Cambridge University Press).
- Chandler, Alfred D. Jr. and James W. Cortada, eds. 2000, A Nation Transformed by Information: How Information Has Shaped the United States from Colonial Times to the Present (Oxford University Press).
- Chandler, Alfred D. Jr., 2001, Inventing the Electronic Century: The Epic Story of the Consumer Electronics and Computer Industries (Harvard University Press).
- Chandler, Alfred D. Jr., 2005, Shaping the Industrial Century: The Remarkable Story of the Evolution of the Modern Chemical and Pharmaceutical Industries (Harvard University Press).
- McCraw, Thomas K., ed. 1988, The Essential Alfred Chandler: Essays Toward a Historical Theory of Big Business (Harvard Business School Press).
- Alfred P. Sloan Jr., edited by John McDonald with Catherine Smith, 1964, My Years with General Motors (Doubleday & Co.).

== Archives and records ==
- Alfred D. Chandler, Jr. papers at Baker Library Special Collections, Harvard Business School.
- Poor family Papers, 1791-1921. Schlesinger Library, Radcliffe Institute, Harvard University.
- Additional papers of the Poor family, 1778-2008. Schlesinger Library, Radcliffe Institute, Harvard University.
