= D. H. MacGregor =

Scottish economist

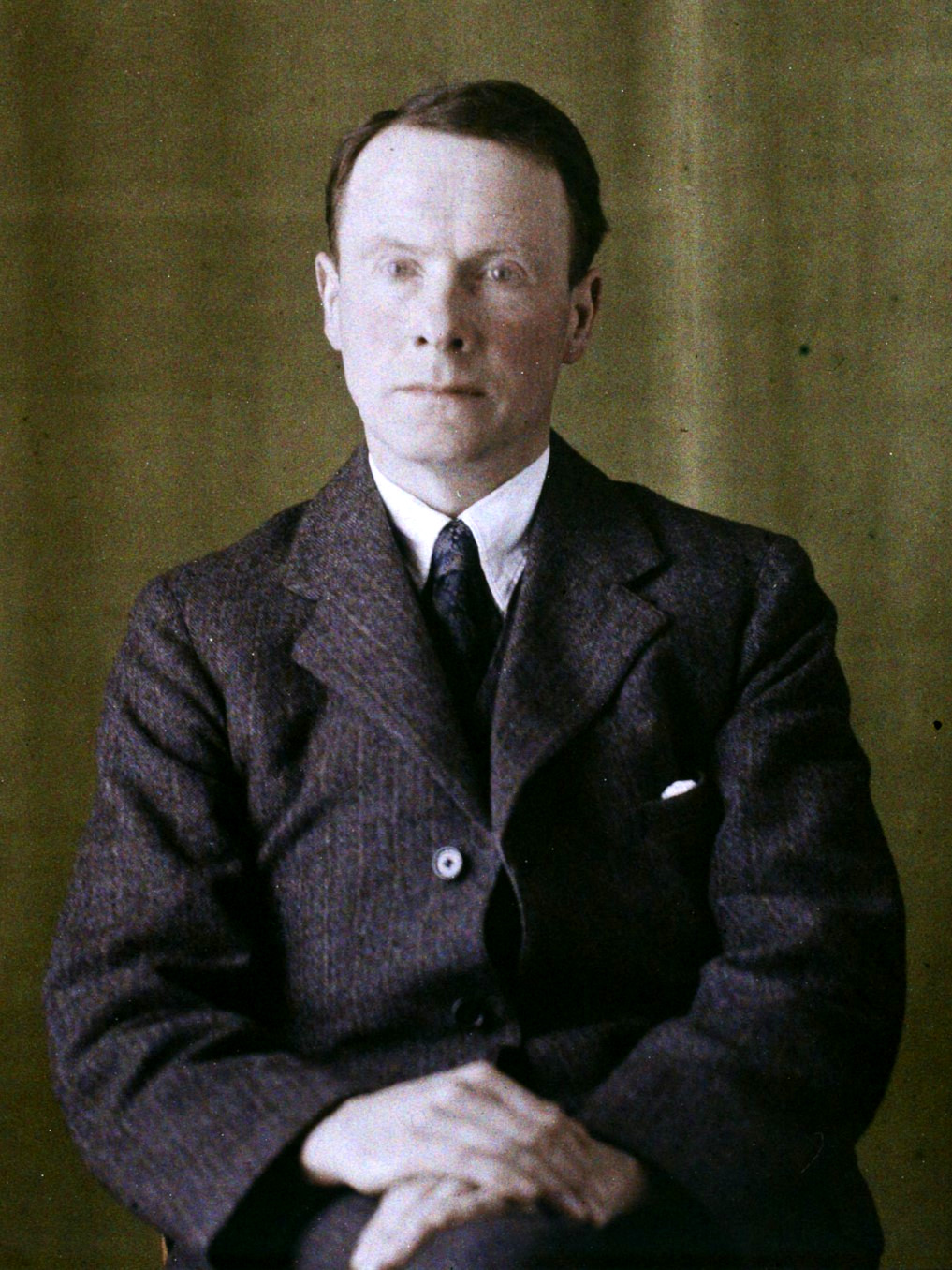
- 1928 Autochrome portrait by Georges Chevalier
- Born: David Hutchison MacGregor; 1877; Monifieth, Angus, Scotland
- Died: May 8, 1953 (aged 75–76); Oxford, England
- Occupation: Economist

David Hutchison MacGregor (1877 – 8 May 1953) was a Scottish economist and Drummond Professor of Political Economy at the University of Oxford and Fellow of All Souls, Oxford, from 1921 to 1945.

== Early life ==
He was born in Monifieth in Angus, the third child of the Rev Robert MacGregor (1841-1915) minister of the Free Church of Scotland, and his wife, Lillias Hannah Hutchison (1842-1920).

MacGregor was educated at George Watson's College, Edinburgh and graduated with first class honours in philosophy from the University of Edinburgh in 1898. He then studied for a further degree in economics at Trinity College, Cambridge under Alfred Marshall; he gained a BA in 1901 and was elected President of the Cambridge Union the following year. In 1904 he was elected a Fellow of Trinity.

== Career ==
From 1908 to 1915, MacGregor was Professor of Economic and Political Science at the University of Leeds. In the First World War from 1915 to 1918, he served in the Royal Engineers in France and Italy, and was awarded the Military Cross for conspicuous gallantry.

In 1919, he became the Stanley Jevons Professor of Political Economy at Manchester, and from 1921 to 1945 was Drummond Professor of Political Economy at Oxford.

== Death ==
He was killed after being hit by a vehicle in Oxford on 8 May 1953.

== Works ==
- Industrial Combinations (1906).
- The Evolution of Industry (1911).
- Enterprise Purpose and Profit: Essays on Industry (1934).
- Public Aspects of Finance (1939).
- Economic Thought and Policy (1949).
