= Ernest Campbell Mossner =

American professor of English (1907–1986)

Ernest Campbell Mossner (October 22, 1907 – August 5, 1986) was a professor of English at the University of Texas at Austin and biographer of the Scottish philosopher, essayist and historian David Hume (1711–1776). He was a specialist also on Hume's friend and contemporary, Adam Smith.

== Life ==
Mossner was born on October 22, 1907, in New York City. He received his bachelor's degree in English, Latin and history from City College of New York in 1929, and his master's and PhD degrees in English and Comparative Literature from Columbia University in 1930 and 1936. On June 22, 1936, he was married to Alice Carolyn Walz, also of New York. He taught briefly at the City College of New York, and Columbia before joining the English faculty at Syracuse University in 1937. He held a Guggenheim Fellowship in 1939 and in 1945. His scholarship was interrupted during World War II, when he worked for the Bureau of the Budget and served in the U.S. Army.

In 1946 Mossner joined the English faculty of the University of Texas at Austin, serving for several years as editor of Texas Studies in Language and Literature. While on a Fulbright Research Fellowship in 1968 he was a visiting professor at Glasgow University, where he would later become a member of a committee established by the University to edit a scholarly edition of the works of Adam Smith. In 1970 he was named Ashbel Smith Professor of English and Philosophy at the University of Texas. He retired from teaching in 1972, and in 1976 received the honorary D.Litt. from Edinburgh University.

Mossner was a member of Phi Beta Kappa, The Modern Humanities Research Association, The International Association of University Professors of English, The Texas Institute of Letters, the advisory board of the Augustan Reprint Society, the South Central Modern Language Association, the Society of American Historians, and the Fortnightly Club of Austin.

David Campbell Mossner, the only child of Ernest and Carolyn, was born on October 2, 1946, and died in Vietnam on June 1, 1970. Ernest and Carolyn Mossner died together at home in Austin, Texas, on August 5, 1986.

== Books ==
- Bishop Butler and the Age of Reason, Macmillan, New York 1936.
- The Forgotten Hume: Le bon David. New York: Columbia University Press. 1943 – via Internet Archive.
- Klibansky, Raymond; Mossner, Ernest C., eds. (1954). New Letters of David Hume. Oxford: Clarendon Press – via Internet Archive.
- The Life of David Hume. Austin, TX: University of Texas Press. 1954. Thomas Nelson & Sons, Edinburgh 1954; Clarendon Press, Oxford 1954, 1970, 1980, 2001.
- A Treatise of Human Nature, David Hume, Penquin Books, New York 1969, 1984.
- Mossner, Ernest Campbell; Ross, Ian Simpson, eds. (1977). The Correspondence of Adam Smith. Oxford: Oxford University Press. ISBN 978-0-19-828185-6 – via Internet Archive.
