= Drummond Professor of Political Economy =

Professorship at the University of Oxford

The Drummond Professorship of Political Economy at All Souls College, Oxford has been held by a number of distinguished individuals, including three Nobel laureates. The professorship is named after and was founded by Henry Drummond.

== List of Drummond Professors ==
- Nassau Senior, 1825–1830 and 1847–52, the first holder
- Richard Whately, 1830–31
- William Forster Lloyd, 1832–37
- Herman Merivale, 1837–
- Travers Twiss, 1841–
- Sir George Kettilby Rickards, 1851–1857
- Charles Neate (1857–1862)
- James Edwin Thorold Rogers, 1862–67 and 1888–
- Bonamy Price, 1868–1888
- Francis Ysidro Edgeworth, 1891–1922
- David Hutchison Macgregor, 1921–1945
- Sir Hubert Douglas Henderson, 1945–51
- Sir John Hicks, 1952–65
- R. C. O. Matthews, 1965–76
- Joseph Stiglitz, 1976–1979
- Amartya Sen, 1980–88
- Sir John Vickers, 1991–2008 (on leave 1998–2005)
- Vincent Crawford, 2010–2020
- Noam Yuchtman, 2023–Present
