= Franco Amatori =

Italian academic

Franco Amatori is professor of economic history at Bocconi University, Milan, Italy.

With a scholarship of the U.S.-Italy Fulbright Commission, Amatori spent three semesters in the individual studies program of Harvard Business School under the tutelage of Alfred D. Chandler, Jr.

Since then, Prof. Amatori has pioneered the academic study of business history in Italy. He has translated Chandler's works into Italian. Also, with Andrea Colli, Prof.

Amatori co-authored a synthesis of Italian industrialization, published in 1999, Impresa e industria in Italia dall'Unità a oggi.
