= Ann Bartel =

American labor economist

- Born: September 15, 1949 (age 76); New York City
- Education: University of Pennsylvania (BA); Columbia University (MA),(PhD)
- Scientific career
- Fields: labor economics
- Workplaces: Columbia Business School, University of Pennsylvania
- Website: https://www0.gsb.columbia.edu/faculty/abartel/

Ann Pelcovits Bartel (born September 15, 1949) is the Merrill Lynch Professor of Workforce Transformation at the Columbia University Graduate School of Business and a Research Associate of the National Bureau of Economic Research.

== Education ==
She graduated from the University of Pennsylvania in 1970, and completed her PhD in economics at Columbia University in 1974.

== Research ==
Bartel's dozens of published papers have included such topics as employee training, human capital investments, job transitions, and the impact of technological change on productivity, worker skills, and outsourcing decisions.

=== Selected works ===
- Bartel, Ann P. "Productivity gains from the implementation of employee training programs." Industrial relations: a journal of economy and society 33, no. 4 (1994): 411–425.
- Bartel, Ann P., and Frank R. Lichtenberg. "The comparative advantage of educated workers in implementing new technology." The Review of Economics and statistics (1987): 1–11.
- Bartel, Ann P. "Where do the new US immigrants live?." Journal of Labor Economics 7, no. 4 (1989): 371–391.
- Bartel, Ann P. "Training, wage growth, and job performance: Evidence from a company database." Journal of Labor Economics 13, no. 3 (1995): 401–425.
- Bartel, Ann, Casey Ichniowski, and Kathryn Shaw. "How does information technology affect productivity? Plant-level comparisons of product innovation, process improvement, and worker skills." The quarterly journal of Economics 122, no. 4 (2007): 1721–1758.
