= John Cameron Bryce =

John Cameron Bryce (15 August 1909 – 7 March 2001) was a Scottish academic, first Bradley Professor of English Literature in the University of Glasgow and editor of The Glasgow Edition of the Works and Correspondence of Adam Smith.

== Early life and education ==
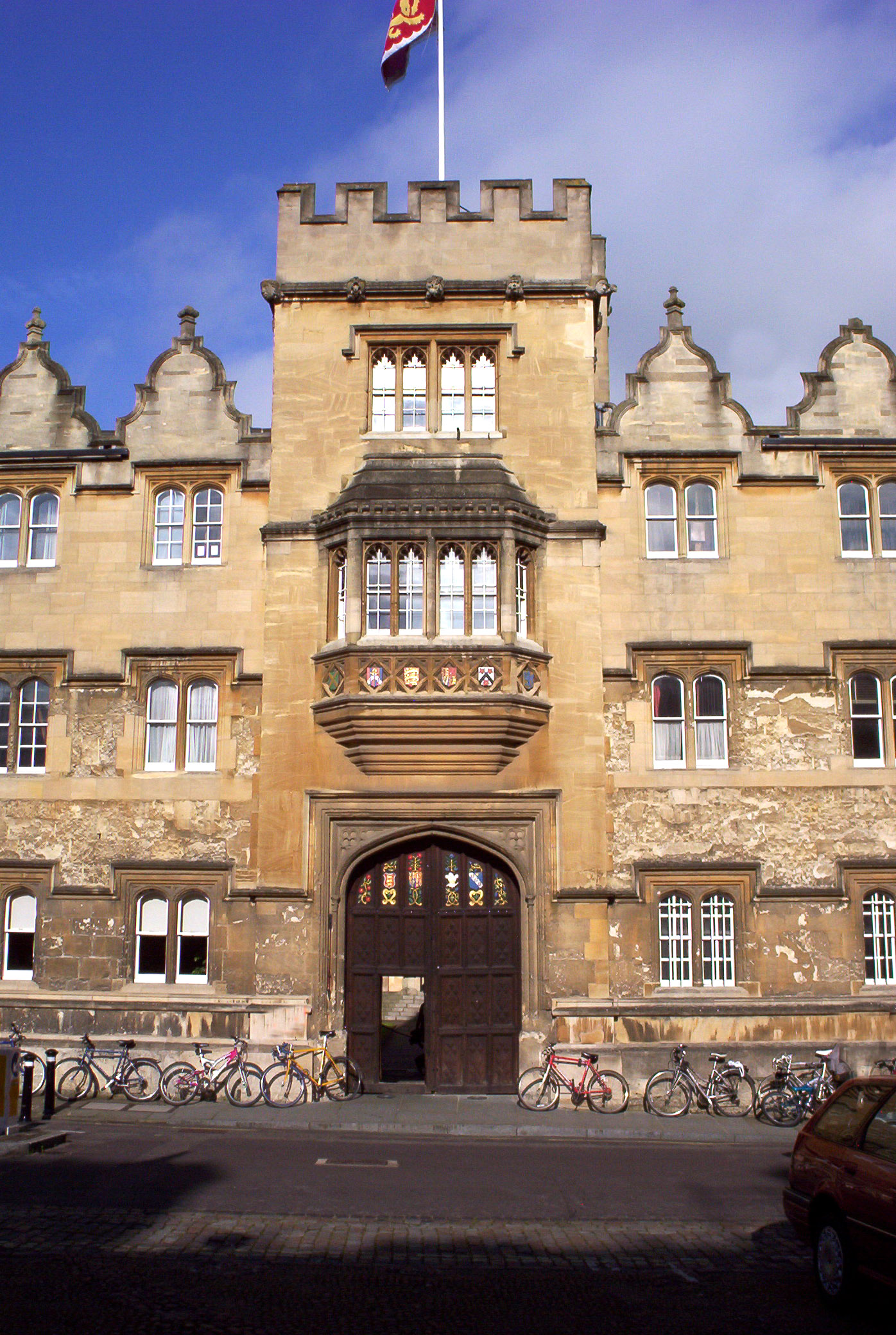
Oriel College, Oxford

Bryce was born at Hamilton, South Lanarkshire, Scotland. After attending Hamilton Academy, of which he was a Dux medallist, Bryce matriculated in the Faculty of Arts, University of Glasgow, in 1927, graduating in 1932 Master of Arts (Scotland) with a First in English language and literature. Having been awarded the four-year George A. Clark Scholarship, Bryce spent the first year of his scholarship at the University of Heidelberg; his second year at the Sorbonne; and his remaining two years at Oriel College, Oxford.

== Career ==
In 1936, Bryce was appointed to a teaching post at the University of Durham but was forced to resign as eye surgery was required on a detached retina, impairing his ability to read and write.

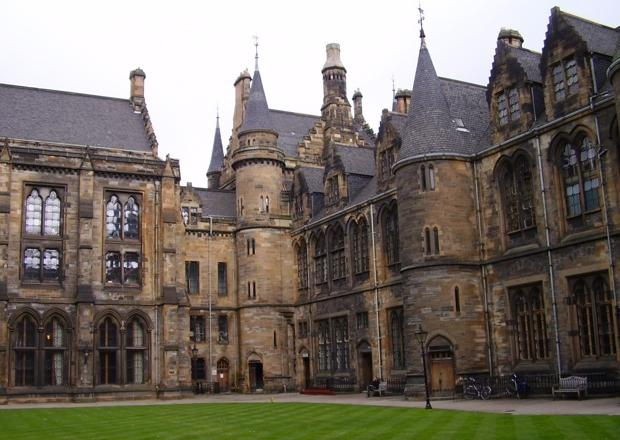
University of Glasgow West Quadrangle

After this set-back, in 1938 he took up a post as assistant lecturer in the English Department, University of Glasgow, at which he was to spend the rest of his career, 'till his retirement in 1979. In 1955, Bryce was appointed a senior lecturer and in 1965 appointed the first holder of the Bradley Chair in English Literature.

== Editor, Works and Correspondence of Adam Smith ==
The general editor of The Glasgow Edition of the Works and Correspondence of Adam Smith, Professor Andrew Skinner, enlisted Bryce as a co-editor and as editor of Smith's Lectures on Rhetoric, drawn from students' notes on Smith's 'lost' lectures that had been discovered by Professor John Lothian at a sale in Aberdeen, Scotland, in 1958. The resulting edited Lectures on Rhetoric and Belles Lettres were published in 1983 as Volume IV of the Glasgow Edition of Smith's works, the complete edition of the works taking over 25 years to complete, and published to international acclaim in seven volumes between 1976 and 1987.

Bryce died at Glasgow aged 91 on 7 March 2001 as Emeritus Professor of English literature, University of Glasgow.

Bryce endowed the Bryce Bequest at the University of Glasgow, creating the Alexander and Dixon Scholarship for the PhD in English literature, in memory of Professor Peter Alexander, former Professor of English Literature at the University of Glasgow, and of Professor W. Mac Neile Dixon.
