= Raymond Klibansky =

German-Canadian historian (1905–2005)

- Born: October 15, 1905; Paris, France
- Died: August 5, 2005 (aged 99); Montreal, Quebec, Canada
- Occupation: Historian of philosophy
- Awards: Order of Canada; National Order of Quebec

Raymond Klibansky CC GOQ (October 15, 1905 – August 5, 2005) was a German-Canadian historian of philosophy and art.

== Biography ==
Born in Paris, to Rosa Scheidt and Hermann Klibansky, he was educated at the University of Kiel, University of Hamburg and Ruprecht Karl University of Heidelberg, where he received a Ph.D. in 1928. From 1927 to 1933 he was an assistant at the Heidelberg Academy and from 1931 until 1933 he was a lecturer in philosophy at the University of Heidelberg. He was married to Ethel Groffier, a professor in the Law Faculty of McGill University.

In 1933 he was no longer able to teach in Germany because he was a Jew. Thereafter he moved with his family to Italy and then to Brussels before finally setting in Oxford, where he was a lecturer at Oriel College, Oxford from 1936 until 1946. He became a British citizen in 1938, and during the Second World War was attached to the Political Warfare Executive, based at Woburn Abbey. He worked at first on Germany, then on preparation for the allied invasion of Italy, and after the war on the denazification programme in Germany.

In 1946 Klibansky became the Frothingham Professor of Logic and Metaphysics at McGill University; he also lectured at the Université de Montréal.

From 1966 to 1969 he was president of the International Institute of Philosophy, and subsequently its honorary president. He was a fellow of Wolfson College, Oxford, from 1981 to 1995 and thereafter an honorary fellow of that college.

In 1999 he was made a Grand Officer of the National Order of Quebec. In 2000 he was made a Companion of the Order of Canada in recognition for being "one of the greatest intellectuals of our time". He died in 2005, two months short of his hundredth birthday.

The Raymond Klibansky Prizes were formerly awarded each year for the best books in the humanities that had received support from the Aid to Scholarly Publications Programme (ASPP), part of the Canadian Federation for the Humanities and Social Sciences. One prize each was awarded to the best English book and the best French book. The prizes are now called simply the Canada Prizes/Prix du Canada.

== Selected bibliography ==
- Ein Proklos-Fund und seine Bedeutung, Heidelberg 1929 (Sitzungsberichte der Heidelberger Akademie der Wissenschaften. Philosophisch-historische Klasse, vol. 19, 1928–29, n. 5)
- The Continuity of the Platonic Tradition during the Middle Ages, London 1939 (repr. 1981)
- Klibansky, Raymond; Mossner, Ernest C., eds. (1954). New Letters of David Hume. Oxford: Clarendon Press – via Internet Archive.
- Le philosophe et la mémoire du siècle: tolérance, liberté et philosophie. Entretiens avec Georges Leroux, Les Belles Lettres, Paris 1998
- Idées sans frontières. Histoire et structures de l’Institut international de philosophie (with Ethel Groffier), Les Belles Lettres, Paris 2005

== Festschrift ==
- Groffier, Ethel; Paradis, Michel, eds. (1991). The Notion of tolerance and human rights : essays in honour of Raymond Klibansky. Don Mills, Ontario: Carleton University Press. ISBN 9780773582200.
