= Economic history of the United Kingdom =

Gross domestic product (GDP) in England 1270 to 2016

The economic history of the United Kingdom covers the economic development of the British state from its initial formation in 1707 following the Treaty of Union and Acts of Union that resulted in the political union of the kingdoms of England and Scotland, into a new unitary state called Great Britain. (Note: The terms One Kingdom, United Kingdom and United Kingdom of Great Britain were used as descriptions in the Treaty of Union. However, the actual name of the new state was ‘Great Britain”.) Ireland was incorporated in the United Kingdom of Great Britain and Ireland economy between 1800 and 1922; from 1922 the Irish Free State (the modern Republic of Ireland) became independent and set its own economic policy.

Great Britain, and England in particular, became one of the most prosperous economic regions in the world between the late 1600s and early 1800s as a result of being the birthplace of the Industrial Revolution that began in the mid-eighteenth century. The developments brought by industrialisation resulted in Britain becoming the premier European and global economic, political, and military power for more than a century. As the first to industrialise, Britain's industrialists revolutionised areas like manufacturing, communication, and transportation through innovations such as the steam engine (for pumps, factories, railway locomotives and steamships), textile equipment, tool-making, the Telegraph, and pioneered the railway system. With these many new technologies Britain manufactured much of the equipment and products used by other nations, becoming known as the "workshop of the world". Its businessmen were leaders in international commerce and banking, trade and shipping. Its markets included both areas that were independent and those that were part of the rapidly expanding British Empire, which by the early 1900s had become the largest empire in history. After 1840, the economic policy of mercantilism was abandoned and replaced by free trade, with fewer tariffs, quotas or restrictions, first outlined by British economist Adam Smith's Wealth of Nations. Britain's globally dominant Royal Navy protected British commercial interests, shipping and international trade, while the British legal system provided a system for resolving disputes relatively inexpensively, and the City of London functioned as the economic capital and focus of the world economy.

Between 1870 and 1900, economic output per head of the United Kingdom rose by 50 per cent (from about £28 per capita to £41 in 1900: an annual average increase in real incomes of 1% p.a.), growth which was associated with a significant rise in living standards. However, and despite this significant economic growth, some economic historians have suggested that Britain experienced a relative economic decline in the last third of the nineteenth century as industrial expansion occurred in the United States and Germany. In 1870, Britain's output per head was the second highest in the world, surpassed only by Australia. In 1914, British income per capita was the world's third highest, exceeded only by New Zealand and Australia; these three countries shared a common economic, social and cultural heritage. In 1950, British output per head was still 30 per cent over that of the average of the six founder members of the EEC, but within 20 years it had been overtaken by the majority of western European economies.

The response of successive British governments to this problematic performance was to seek economic growth stimuli within what became the European Union; Britain entered the European Community in 1973. Thereafter the United Kingdom's relative economic performance improved substantially to the extent that, just before the Great Recession, British income per capita exceeded, albeit marginally, that of France and Germany; furthermore, there was a significant reduction in the gap in income per capita terms between the UK and USA.

== 16th–17th centuries ==
Ancient coat of arms of the Tudor family

During the 16th and 17th century many fundamental economic changes occurred, these resulted in rising incomes and paved the way to the industrialisation. After 1600, the North Sea Region took over the role of the leading economic centre of Europe from the Mediterranean, which prior to this date, particularly in northern Italy, had been the most highly developed part of Europe. Great Britain, together with the Low Countries, profited more in the long run from the expansion of trade in the Atlantic and Asia than the pioneers of this trade, Spain and Portugal, fundamentally because of the success of the mainly privately owned enterprises in these two Northern countries in contrast to the arguably less successful state-owned economic systems in Iberia.

After the Black Death in the mid 14th century, and the agricultural depression of the late 15th century, the population began to increase. The export of woollen products resulted in an economic upturn with products exported to mainland Europe. Henry VII negotiated the favourable Intercursus Magnus treaty in 1496.

The high wages and abundance of available land seen in the late 15th century and early 16th century were temporary. When the population recovered, low wages and a land shortage returned. Historians in the early 20th century characterised the economic in terms of general decline, manorial reorganisation, and agricultural contraction. Later historians dropped those themes and stressed the transitions between medieval forms and Tudor progress.

John Leland left rich descriptions of the local economies he witnessed during his travels from 1531 to 1560. He described markets, ports, industries, buildings and transport links. He showed some small towns were expanding, through new commercial and industrial opportunities, especially cloth manufacture. He found other towns in decline, and suggested that investment by entrepreneurs and benefactors had enabled some small towns to prosper. Taxation was a negative factor in economic growth, since it was imposed, not on consumption, but on capital investments.

According to Derek Hirst, outside of politics and religion, the 1640s and 1650s saw a revived economy characterised by growth in manufacturing, the elaboration of financial and credit instruments, and the commercialisation of communication. The gentry found time for leisure activities, such as horse racing and bowling. In the high culture important innovations included the development of a mass market for music, increased scientific research, and an expansion of publishing. All the trends were discussed in depth at the newly established coffee houses.

=== Credit and money supply ===
The economy grew faster than the money supply in this period. Few coins were in circulation due to the scarcity of precious metals and instead most transactions were made on credit. The numerous debts were usually settled during reckonings held at convenient intervals. Reciprocal debts were cancelled and only the difference had to be paid with cash. Other than that coins were used for specific purposes such as small transactions between strangers, for paying taxes and for overseas trade. Overall coins formed less than 10% of all exchanges.

Spanish and Portuguese colonies in the New World exported large quantities of silver and gold to Europe, some of which added to the English money supply. There were multiple results that all expanded the English economy, according to Dr. Nuno Palma of the University of Manchester. The key features of the growth pattern included specialisation and structural change, and increases in market participation. The new supply of specie (silver and gold) increased the money supply. Instead of promissory notes paid off by future promissory notes, business transactions were supported by specie. This reduced transaction costs, increased the coverage of the market, and opened incentives and opportunities to participate in cash transaction. Demand arose for luxury goods from Asia, such as silk and pepper, which created new markets. The increased supply of specie made tax collection easier, allowing the government to build up fiscal capacity and provide for public goods.

Various inflationary pressures existed; some were due to an influx of New World gold and a rising population. Inflation had a negative effect on the real wealth of most families. It set the stage for social upheaval as the gap between the rich and poor widening. This was a period of significant change for the majority of the rural population, with manorial land owners introducing enclosure measures.

=== Exports ===
Exports increased significantly, especially within the British empire. Mostly privately owned companies traded with the colonies in the West Indies, Northern America and India.

The Company of Merchant Adventurers of London brought together London's leading overseas merchants in a regulated company in the early 15th century, in the nature of a guild. Its members' main business was the export of cloth, especially white (undyed) woollen broadcloth. This enabled them to import a large range of foreign goods. Given the trade conditions of the time, England came up with a public policy to increase Armenian merchants' involvement in English trade to pursue its commercial interests. Accordingly, in 1688 a trade agreement was signed in London between English East India Company and Kjoja Panos Kalantar. Armenian merchants received privileges to carry out commercial activities in England. England, in its turn, wanted to change the main trade route from Europe to Asia, and from now on, Armenians, instead of overlanding in Arabia or Persia, used England. With this agreement, England wanted to take over the control that Dutch and France had at that time on world exports.

=== Wool industry ===
Woollen cloth was the chief export and most important employer after agriculture. The golden era of the Wiltshire woollen industry was in the reign of Henry VIII. In the medieval period, raw wool had been exported, but now England had an industry, based on its 11 million sheep. London and towns purchased wool from dealers, and send it to rural households where family labour turned it into cloth. They washed the wool, carded it and spun it into thread, which was then turned into cloth on a loom. Export merchants, known as Merchant Adventurers, exported woollens into the Netherlands and Germany, as well as other lands. The arrival of Huguenots from France brought in new skills that expanded the industry.

Government intervention proved a disaster in the early 17th century. A new company convinced Parliament to transfer to them the monopoly held by the old, well-established Company of Merchant Adventurers. Arguing that the export of unfinished cloth was much less profitable than the export of the finished product, the new company got Parliament to ban the export of unfinished cloth. There was massive dislocation marketplace, as large unsold quantities built up, prices fell, and unemployment rose. Worst of all, the Dutch retaliated and refused to import any finished cloth from England. Exports fell by a third. Quickly the ban was lifted, and the Merchant Adventurers got its monopoly back. However, the trade losses became permanent.

=== Diets ===
Diet depended largely upon social class. The rich ate meat—beef, pork, venison and white bread; the poor ate coarse dark bread, with a little meat, notably at Christmas. Game poaching supplemented the diet of the rural poor. Everyone drank ale or cider as water was often too impure to drink. Fruits and vegetables were seldom eaten. Rich spices were used by the wealthy to offset the smells of stale salted meat. The potato had yet to become part of the diet. The rich enjoyed desserts such as pastries, tarts, cakes, and crystallised fruit, and syrup.

Among the rich private hospitality was an important item in their budget. Entertaining a royal party for a few weeks could be ruinous to a nobleman. Inns existed for travellers but restaurants were not known.

Both the rich and the poor had diets with nutritional deficiency. The lack of vegetables and fruits in their diets caused a deficiency in vitamin C, sometimes resulting in scurvy.

Trade and industry flourished in the 16th century, making England more prosperous and improving the standard of living of the upper and middle classes. However, the lower classes did not benefit much and did not always have enough food. As the English population was fed by its own agricultural produce, a series of bad harvests in the 1590s caused widespread distress.

In the 17th century the food supply improved. England had no food crises from 1650 to 1725, a period when France was unusually vulnerable to famines. Historians point out that oat and barley prices in England did not always increase following a failure of the wheat crop, but did so in France.

=== Poverty ===
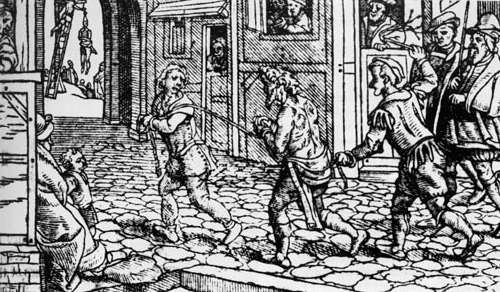
A woodcut from circa 1536 depicting a vagrant being punished in the streets in Tudor England

About one-third of the population lived in poverty, with the wealthy expected to give alms to assist the impotent poor. Tudor law was harsh on the able-bodied poor, those physically fit but unable to find work. Those who left their parishes in order to locate work were termed vagabonds and could be subjected to punishments, often suffering whipping and being put in the stocks. This treatment was inflicted to encourage them to return to their "mother parish."

== 18th century ==
=== The trading nation ===
The 18th century was prosperous as entrepreneurs extended the range of their business around the globe. By the 1720s Britain was one of the most prosperous countries in the world, and Daniel Defoe boasted: "We are the most diligent nation in the world. Vast trade, rich manufactures, mighty wealth, universal correspondence, and happy success have been constant companions of England, and given us the title of an industrious people."

While the other major powers were primarily motivated toward territorial gains, and protection of their dynasties (such as the Habsburg, Romanov dynasty and Prussia's House of Hohenzollern), Britain had a different set of primary interests. Its main diplomatic goal (besides protecting the homeland from invasion) was building a worldwide trading network for its merchants, manufacturers, shippers and financiers. This required a hegemonic Royal Navy so powerful that no rival could sweep its ships from the world's trading routes, or invade the British Isles. The London government enhanced the private sector by incorporating numerous privately financed London-based companies for establishing trading posts and opening import-export businesses across the world. Each was given a monopoly of trade to the specified geographical region. The first enterprise was the Muscovy Company set up in 1555 to trade with Russia. Other prominent enterprises included the East India Company, and the Hudson's Bay Company in Canada. The Company of Royal Adventurers Trading to Africa had been set up in 1662 to trade in gold, ivory and slaves in Africa; it was reestablished as the Royal African Company in 1672 and focused on the Atlantic slave trade. British involvement in each of the four major wars, 1740 to 1783, paid off handsomely in terms of trade. Even the loss of the Thirteen Colonies was made up by a very favourable trading relationship with the new United States of America. Britain gained dominance in the trade with India, and largely dominated the highly lucrative slave, sugar, and commercial trades originating in West Africa and the West Indies. Exports soared from £6.5 million in 1700, to £14.7 million in 1760 and £43.2 million in 1800. Other powers set up similar monopolies on a much smaller scale; only the Netherlands emphasised trade as much as England.

Most of the companies earned good profits, and enormous personal fortunes were created in India. However, there was one major fiasco that caused heavy losses. The South Sea Bubble was a business enterprise that exploded in scandal. The South Sea Company was a private business corporation supposedly set up much like the other trading companies, with a focus on South America. Its actual purpose was to renegotiate previous high-interest government loans amounting to £31 million through market manipulation and speculation. It issued stock four times in 1720 that reached about 8,000 investors. Prices kept soaring every day, from £130 a share to £1,000, with insiders making huge paper profits. The Bubble collapsed overnight, ruining many speculators. Investigations showed bribes had reached into high places—even to the king. His chief minister Robert Walpole managed to wind it down with minimal political and economic damage, although some losers fled to exile or committed suicide.

=== The age of mercantilism ===
The basis of the British Empire was founded in the age of mercantilism, an economic theory that stressed maximising the exports to and minimising imports from countries outside the empire, and trying to weaken rival empires. The 18th century British Empire was based upon the preceding English overseas possessions, which began to take shape in the late 16th and early 17th century, with the English settlement of islands of the West Indies such as Trinidad and Tobago, the Bahamas, the Leeward Islands, Barbados, Jamaica, and Bermuda, and of Virginia, one of the Thirteen Colonies which in 1776 became the United States, as well as of the Maritime provinces of what is now Canada. The sugar plantation islands of the Caribbean, where slavery became the basis of the economy, comprised England's most lucrative colonies. The American colonies also used slave labour in the farming of tobacco, indigo, and rice in the south. England, and later Great Britain's, American empire was slowly expanded by war and colonisation. Victory over the French during the Seven Years' War gave Great Britain control over what is now eastern Canada.

Mercantilism was the basic policy imposed by Britain on its colonies. Mercantilism meant that the government and the merchants became partners with the goal of increasing political power and private wealth, to the exclusion of other empires. The government protected its merchants—and kept others out—by trade barriers, regulations, and subsidies to domestic industries in order to maximise exports from and minimise imports to the realm. The Navigation Acts of the late 17th century provided the legal foundation for Mercantilist policy. They required all trade to be carried in English ships, manned by English crews (this later encompassed all Britons after the Acts of Union 1707 united Scotland with England). Colonists were required to send their produce and raw materials first of all to Britain, where the surplus was then sold-on by British merchants to other colonies in the British empire or bullion-earning external markets. The colonies were forbidden to trade directly with other nations or rival empires. The goal was to maintain the North American and Caribbean colonies as dependent agricultural economies geared towards producing raw materials for export to Britain. The growth of native industry was discouraged, in order to keep the colonies dependent on Britain for their finished goods.

The government had to fight smuggling—which became a favorite American technique in the 18th century to circumvent the restrictions on trading with the French, Spanish or Dutch. The goal of mercantilism was to run trade surpluses, so that gold and silver would pour into London. The government took its share through duties and taxes, with the remainder going to merchants in Britain. The government spent much of its revenue on a superb Royal Navy, which not only protected the British colonies but threatened the colonies of the other empires, and sometimes seized them. Thus the British Navy captured New Amsterdam (New York City) in 1664. The colonies were captive markets for British industry, and the goal was to enrich the mother country.

=== Manufacturing ===
Besides woollens, cotton, silk and linen cloth manufacturing became important after 1600, as did coal and iron.

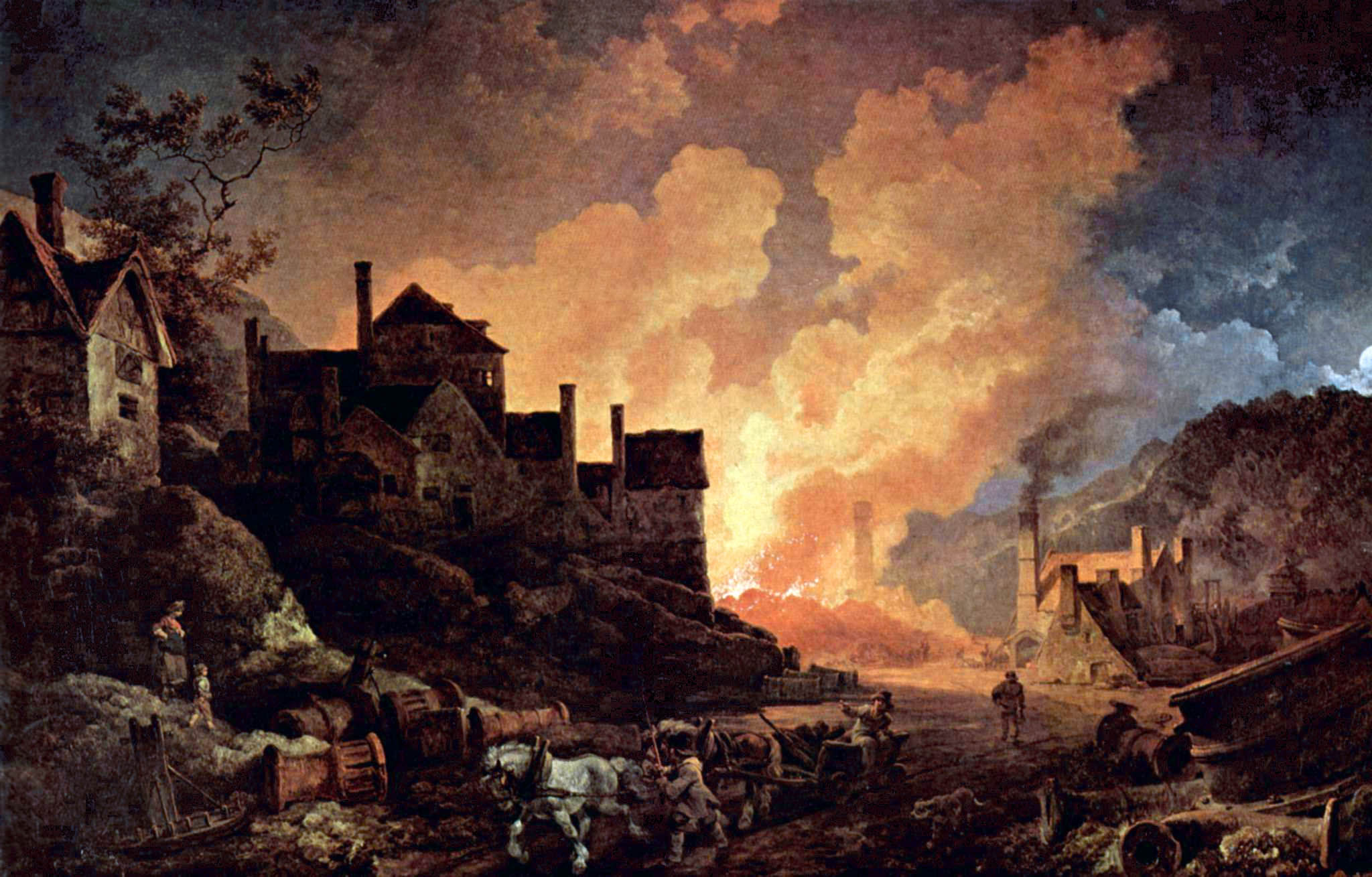
Coalbrookdale by Night, 1801. Blast furnaces light the iron making town of Coalbrookdale.

In 1709, Abraham Darby I established a coke-fired blast furnace to produce cast iron, replacing charcoal, although continuing to use blast furnaces. The ensuing availability of inexpensive iron was one of the factors leading to the Industrial Revolution. Toward the end of the 18th century, cast iron began to replace wrought iron for certain purposes, because it was cheaper. Carbon content in iron was not implicated as the reason for the differences in properties of wrought iron, cast iron, and steel until the 18th century.

=== The Industrial Revolution ===
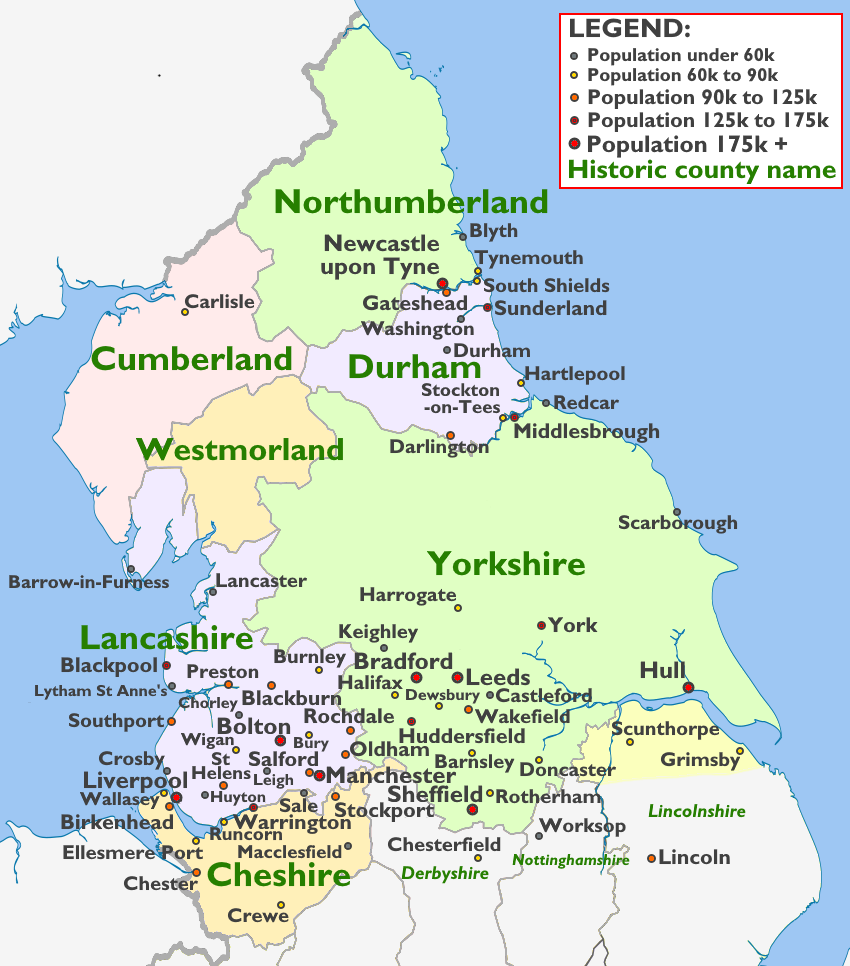
The industrial revolution led to mass urbanisation, especially in Northern England

In period loosely dated from the 1770s to the 1820s, Britain experienced an accelerated process of economic change that transformed a largely agrarian economy into the world's first industrial economy. This phenomenon is known as the "Industrial Revolution", since the changes were far-reaching and permanent throughout many areas of Britain, especially in the developing cities.

Economic, institutional, and social changes were fundamental to the emergence of the industrial revolution. Whereas absolutism remained the normal form of governance through most parts of Europe, in the UK a fundamentally different power balance was created after the revolutions of 1640 and 1688. The new institutional setup ensured property rights and political safety and thereby supported the emergence of an economically prosperous middle class. Another factor is the change in marriage patterns through this period. Marrying later allowed young people to acquire more education, thereby building up more human capital in the population. These changes enhanced the already relatively developed labour and financial markets, paving the way for the industrial revolution starting in the mid-18th century.

Great Britain provided the legal and cultural foundations that enabled entrepreneurs to pioneer the industrial revolution. Starting in the later part of the 18th century, there began a transition in parts of Great Britain's previously manual labour and draft-animal–based economy towards machine-based manufacturing. It started with the mechanisation of the textile industries, the development of iron-making techniques and the increased use of refined coal. Trade expansion was enabled by the introduction of canals, improved roads and railways. Factories pulled thousands from low productivity work in agriculture to high productivity urban jobs.

The introduction of steam power fuelled primarily by coal, wider utilisation of water wheels and powered machinery (mainly in textile manufacturing) underpinned the dramatic increases in production capacity. The development of all-metal machine tools in the first two decades of the 19th century facilitated the manufacture of more production machines for manufacturing in other industries. The effects spread throughout Western Europe and North America during the 19th century, eventually affecting most of the world, a process that continues as industrialisation. The historian Emma Griffin has placed particular emphasis on the role of the steam engine in the making of Britain's Industrial Revolution.

According to Max Weber, the foundations of this process of change can be traced back to the Puritan Ethic of the Puritans of the 17th century. This produced modern personalities attuned to innovation and committed to a work ethic, inspiring landed and merchant elites alive to the benefits of modernisation, and a system of agriculture able to produce increasingly cheap food supplies. To this must be added the influence of religious nonconformity, which increased literacy and inculcated a "Protestant work ethic" amongst skilled artisans.

A long run of good harvests, starting in the first half of the 18th century, resulted in an increase in disposable income and a consequent rising demand for manufactured goods, particularly textiles. The invention of the flying shuttle by John Kay enabled wider cloth to be woven faster, but also created a demand for yarn that could not be fulfilled. Thus, the major technological advances associated with the industrial revolution were concerned with spinning. James Hargreaves created the Spinning Jenny, a device that could perform the work of a number of spinning wheels. However, while this invention could be operated by hand, the water frame, invented by Richard Arkwright, could be powered by a water wheel. Indeed, Arkwright is credited with the widespread introduction of the factory system in Britain, and is the first example of the successful mill owner and industrialist in British history. The water frame was, however, soon supplanted by the spinning mule (a cross between a water frame and a jenny) invented by Samuel Crompton. Mules were later constructed in iron by Messrs. Horrocks of Stockport.

As they were water powered, the first mills were constructed in rural locations by streams or rivers. Workers villages were created around them, such as New Lanark Mills in Scotland. These spinning mills resulted in the decline of the domestic system, in which spinning with old slow equipment was undertaken in rural cottages.

The steam engine was invented and became a power supply that soon surpassed waterfalls and horsepower. The first practicable steam engine was invented by Thomas Newcomen, and was used for pumping water out of mines. A much more powerful steam engine was invented by James Watt; it had a reciprocating engine capable of powering machinery. The first steam-driven textile mills began to appear in the last quarter of the 18th century, and this transformed the industrial revolution into an urban phenomenon, greatly contributing to the appearance and rapid growth of industrial towns.

The progress of the textile trade soon outstripped the original supplies of raw materials. By the turn of the 19th century, imported American cotton had replaced wool in the North West of England, though wool remained the chief textile in Yorkshire. Textiles have been identified as the catalyst in technological change in this period. The application of steam power stimulated the demand for coal; the demand for machinery and rails stimulated the iron industry; and the demand for transportation to move raw material in and finished products out stimulated the growth of the canal system, and (after 1830) the railway system.

Such an unprecedented degree of economic growth was not sustained by domestic demand alone. The application of technology and the factory system created such levels of mass production and cost efficiency that enabled British manufacturers to export inexpensive cloth and other items worldwide.

Walt Rostow has posited the 1790s as the "take-off" period for the industrial revolution. This means that a process previously responding to domestic and other external stimuli began to feed upon itself, and became an unstoppable and irreversible process of sustained industrial and technological expansion.

In the late 18th century and early 19th century a series of technological advances led to the Industrial Revolution. Britain's position as the world's pre-eminent trader helped fund research and experimentation. The nation also had some of the world's greatest reserves of coal, the main fuel of the new revolution.

It was also fuelled by a rejection of mercantilism in favour of the predominance of Adam Smith's capitalism. The fight against Mercantilism was led by a number of liberal thinkers, such as Richard Cobden, Joseph Hume, Francis Place and John Roebuck.

Some have stressed the importance of natural or financial resources that Britain received from its many overseas colonies or that profits from the British slave trade between Africa and the Caribbean helped fuel industrial investment, citing "bigger markets for British goods, larger profits to British investors, more and cheaper raw materials for emerging industrial sectors, and more incentives for British consumers than were offered by domestic industries or other foreign markets".

The Industrial Revolution saw a rapid transformation in the British economy and society. Previously, large industries had to be near forests or rivers for power. The use of coal-fuelled engines allowed them to be placed in large urban centres. These new factories proved far more efficient at producing goods than the cottage industry of a previous era. These manufactured goods were sold around the world, and raw materials and luxury goods were imported to Britain.

=== Empire ===
During the Industrial Revolution the empire became less important and less well-regarded. The British defeat in the American War of Independence (1775–1783) deprived it of its largest and most developed colonies. This loss brought a realisation that colonies were not particularly economically beneficial to the home economy. It was realised that the costs of occupation of colonies often exceeded the financial return to the taxpayer. In other words, formal empire afforded no great economic benefit when trade would continue whether the overseas political entities were nominally sovereign or not. The American Revolution helped demonstrate this by showing that Britain could still control trade with the colonies without having to pay for their defence and governance. This encouraged the British to grant their colonies self-government, starting with Canada, which became unified and largely independent in 1867, and Australia, which followed suit in 1901.

=== Napoleonic Wars ===
Critical to British success in confronting Napoleon was its superior economic situation. It was able to mobilise the nation's industrial and financial resources and apply them to defeating the First French Empire. With a population of 16 million Britain was barely half the size of France with 30 million. In terms of soldiers, the French numerical advantage was offset by British subsidies that paid for a large proportion of the Austrian and Russian soldiers, peaking at about 450,000 in 1813.

Most important, the British national output remained strong. Textiles and iron grew sharply. Iron production expanded as demand for cannon and munitions was insatiable. Agricultural prices soared—it was a golden age for agriculture even as food shortages appeared here and there. There were riots in Cornwall, Devon, and Somerset during the food shortages of 1800–01. Mobs forced merchants to hand over their stocks, as the food was distributed to the hungry by popular committees. Wells concludes that the disturbances indicate deep social grievances that extended far beyond the immediate food shortages. Overall, however, crop production grew 50% between 1795 and 1815.

The system of smuggling finished products into the continent undermined French efforts to ruin the British economy by cutting off markets. The well-organised business sector channelled products into what the military needed. Not only did British cloth provide for British uniforms, it clothed the allies as well and indeed the French soldiers too. Britain used its economic power to expand the Royal Navy, doubling the number of frigates and increasing the number of large ships of the line by 50%, while increasing the roster of sailors from 15,000 to 133,000 in eight years after the war began in 1793. France, meanwhile, saw its navy shrink by more than half.

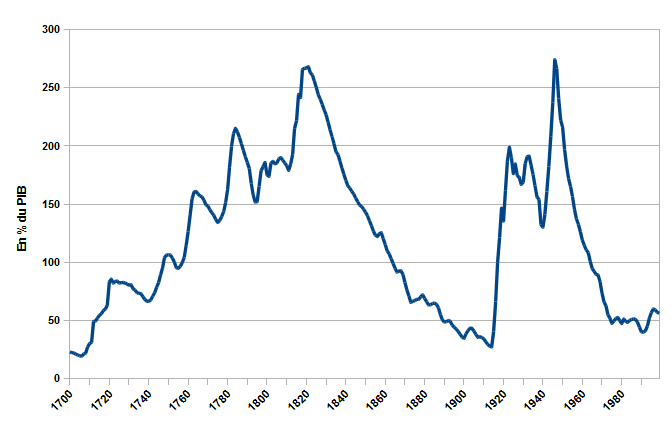
The national debt of the United Kingdom was at a record high percentage of the GDP as the Napoleonic wars ended, but was largely repaid by 1914.

The British budget in 1814 reached £66 million, including £10 million for the Navy, £40 million for the Army, £10 million for the Allies, and £38 million as interest on the national debt. The national debt soared to £679 million, more than double the GDP. It was willingly supported by hundreds of thousands of investors and tax payers, despite the higher taxes on land and a new income tax. The whole cost of the war came to £831 million. By contrast the French financial system was inadequate and Napoleon's forces had to rely in part on requisitions from conquered lands.

==== Long-term favourable impact ====
O'Brien examines the long-term economic impact of the wars of 1793–1815, and finds them generally favourable, except for damage to the working class. The economy was not damaged by the diversion of manpower to the army and navy; in terms of destruction and enforced transfer of national wealth, Britain came out ahead. British control of the oceans proved optimal in creating a liberal free-trade global economy, and helped Britain gain the lion's share of the world's carrying trade and financial support services. The effects were positive for agriculture and most industries, apart from construction. The rate of capital formation was slowed somewhat and national income perhaps would have grown even faster without war. The most negative impact was a drop in living standards for the urban working classes.

== 19th century ==
19th century Britain was the world's richest and most advanced economy, while 19th century Ireland experienced the worst famine in Europe in that century. Real GDP per person almost doubled in the 90 years between 1780 and 1870, when it reached $3263 per capita. This was one third greater than GDP per person in the United States, and 70% more than both France and Germany. The economy was the most industrialised in the world, with one-third of the population employed in manufacturing by 1870 (concurrently one-sixth of the workforce in the United States was employed in manufacturing). The level of quantifiable steam power (in both industry and railroad travel), was gauged at 7,600 hp in 1880, only exceeded by the United States. Urbanisation was so intense that by 1901 80% of the British population lived in towns. The number of towns with a population over 50,000 reached 32 between 1847 and 1850, double that of Germany and almost five times that of the United States. By 1901 there were 74 British towns which met the 50,000 minimum threshold.

=== Free trade ===
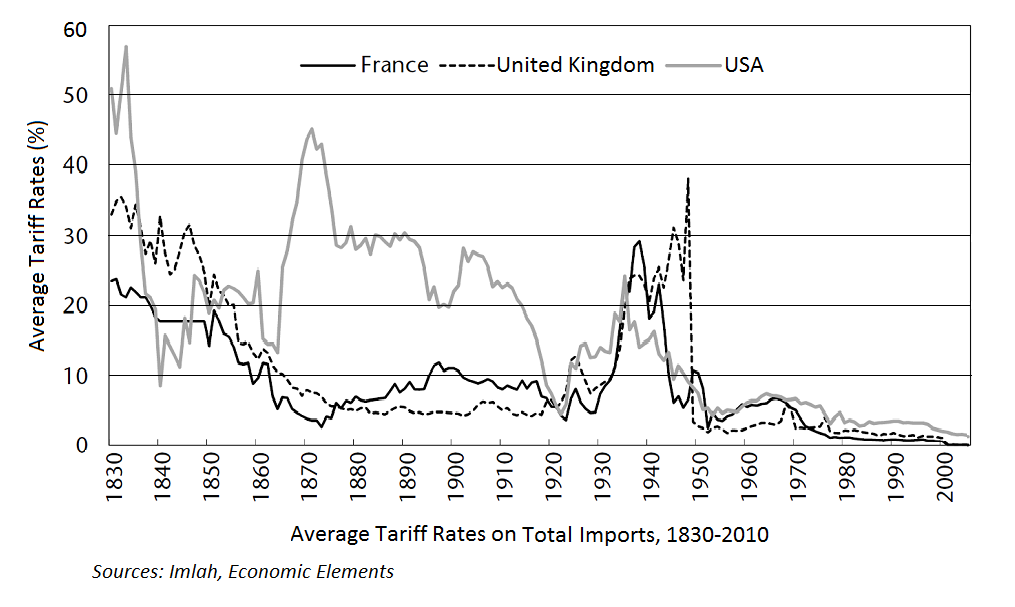
Tariff Rates (France, UK, US)

Free trade was intellectually established by 1780 and implemented in the 1840s, thanks to the unusually strong influence of political theorists such as Adam Smith. They convincingly argued that the old policy of mercantilism held back the British economy, which if unfettered was poised to dominate world trade. As predicted, British dominance of world trade was apparent by the 1850s.

After 1840, Britain committed its economy to free trade, with few barriers or tariffs. This was most evident in the repeal in 1846 of the Corn Laws, which had imposed stiff tariffs on imported grain. The end of these laws opened the British market to unfettered competition; grain prices fell, and food became more plentiful within Great Britain. The same was not true, however, in Ireland where the 1840s saw the worst famine in Europe in that century. By re-introducing income taxes in 1842 at the rate of 7 pennies on the pound (or roughly 3%) for incomes over £150, the government of Sir Robert Peel was able to compensate for loss of revenue and repeal import duties on over 700 items.

From 1815 to 1870, Britain reaped the benefits of being the world's first modern, industrialised nation. It described itself as "the workshop of the world", meaning that its finished goods were produced so efficiently and cheaply that they could often undersell comparable, locally manufactured goods in almost any other market. If political conditions in a particular overseas market were stable enough, Britain could dominate its economy through free trade alone without having to resort to formal rule or mercantilism. Britain was even supplying half the needs in manufactured goods of such nations as Germany, France, Belgium, and the United States. By 1820, 30% of Britain's exports went to its Empire, rising slowly to 35% by 1910. Until the latter 19th century, India remained Britain's economic jewel in terms of both imports and exports. In 1867, when British exports to her Empire totaled £50 million, £21 million of that was earned from India's market alone. Second to India, but far behind, was Australia, whose imports from Britain totaled £8 million, followed by Canada (£5.8 million), Hong Kong (£2.5 million), Singapore (£2 million), and New Zealand (£1.6 million). While these figures were undoubtedly significant, they represented just over a third of total British exports, the same proportion as over forty years before.

Apart from coal, iron, tin and kaolin most raw materials had to be imported so that, in the 1830s, the main imports were (in order): raw cotton (from the American South), sugar (from the West Indies), wool, silk, tea (from China), timber (from Canada), wine, flax, hides and tallow. By 1900, Britain's global share had soared to 22.8% of total imports. By 1922, its global share was 14.9% of total exports and 28.8% of manufactured exports.

However, while in the 1890s Britain persisted in its free trade policy its major rivals, the U.S. and Germany, turned to high and moderately high tariffs respectively. American heavy industry grew faster than Britain and by the 1890s was competing with British machinery and other products in the world market.

==== Imperialism of Free Trade ====
Historians agree that in the 1840s, Britain adopted a free-trade policy, meaning open markets and no tariffs throughout the empire. The debate among historians involves what the implications of free trade actually were. "The Imperialism of Free Trade" is a highly influential 1952 article by John Gallagher and Ronald Robinson. They argued that the New Imperialism of the 1880s, especially the Scramble for Africa, was a continuation of a long-term policy in which informal empire, based on the principles of free trade, was favoured over formal imperial control. The article helped launch the Cambridge School of historiography. Gallagher and Robinson used the British experience to construct a framework for understanding European imperialism that swept away the all-or-nothing thinking of previous historians. They found that European leaders rejected the notion that "imperialism" had to be based upon formal, legal control by one government over a colonial region. Much more important was informal influence in independent areas. According to Wm. Roger Louis, "In their view, historians have been mesmerized by formal empire and maps of the world with regions colored red. The bulk of British emigration, trade, and capital went to areas outside the formal British Empire. Key to their thinking is the idea of empire 'informally if possible and formally if necessary.'" Oron Hale says that Gallagher and Robinson looked at the British involvement in Africa where they, "found few capitalists, less capital, and not much pressure from the alleged traditional promoters of colonial expansion. Cabinet decisions to annex or not to annex were made, usually on the basis of political or geopolitical considerations."

Reviewing the debate from the end of the 20th century, historian Martin Lynn argues that Gallagher and Robinson exaggerated the impact. He says that Britain achieved its goal of increasing its economic interests in many areas, "but the broader goal of 'regenerating' societies and thereby creating regions tied as 'tributaries' to British economic interests was not attained." The reasons were:

the aim to reshape the world through free trade and its extension overseas owed more to the misplaced optimism of British policy-makers and their partial views of the world than to an understanding of the realities of the mid-19th century globe ... the volumes of trade and investment ... the British were able to generate remained limited ... Local economies and local regimes proved adept at restricting the reach of British trade and investment. Local impediments to foreign inroads, the inhabitants' low purchasing power, the resilience of local manufacturing, and the capabilities of local entrepreneurs meant that these areas effectively resisted British economic penetration.

=== Agriculture ===
A free market for imported foodstuffs, the driving factor behind the 1846 repeal of the Corn Laws, reaped long-term benefits for consumers in Great Britain as world agricultural production increased. Consumers in Ireland, where there was severe famine in the 1840s, did not benefit to the same extent. At first agriculture in Great Britain, through its superior productivity, was able to weather and even thrive following the repeal of the Corn Laws, contrary to the dire warnings of the landowners who had warned of immediate agricultural ruin. By the 1870s, the global price of grain began to fall dramatically following the opening up of the Midwestern United States and interior of Canada to mechanised cultivation. Combined with lower global transportation costs, the average price of a quarter of grain fell from 56s in the years 1867–71, to 27s 3d per quarter in 1894–98. This lowered the cost of living and enabled Britain to meet the demands of a quickly growing population (grain imports tripled in volume between 1870 and 1914, while the population grew 43% between 1871 and 1901). It also caused the Great Depression of British Agriculture in the countryside by the late 1870s, where a series of bad harvests combined with the far cheaper price of foreign grain induced a long decline for the British agricultural sector. Wheat-producing areas like East Anglia were especially hard hit, with overall wheat cultivation down from 13% of agricultural output in 1870, to 4% in 1900. Landowners argued for a re-introduction of the Corn Laws to protect domestic farming, but this was rebuffed by Prime Minister Benjamin Disraeli, who argued that returning to protectionism would endanger British manufacturing supremacy.

In addition to the general slump in demand, greater mechanisation in British agriculture, typified by the introduction of steam-powered threshing machines, mowers, and reapers, increased unemployment for rural workers. The result was an acceleration of migration from country to town, where jobs in factories, domestic service, and other occupations offered better wages and more opportunities. The male workforce of the countryside decreased by 40% between 1861 and 1901, while agriculture as a percentage of the national wealth fell from 20.3% in 1851 to just 6.4% by 1901. The depression did not apply only to foodstuffs, but also to wool producers, a once vital sector undercut by a flood of cheap wool imports from Australia and New Zealand. Only select types of produce where freshness was imperative, like milk and meat, enjoyed strong domestic demand in the late 19th century.

The declining profitability of agriculture in the latter decades of the 19th century left British landowners hard pressed to maintain their accustomed lifestyles. The connection between land ownership and wealth which had for centuries underpinned the British aristocracy began an inexorable decline. Rents fell some 26% between the mid-1870s and mid-1890s, just as the amount of land under cultivation fell some 19%. 88% of British millionaires between the years 1809–1879 were defined as landowners; the proportion fell to 33% in the years 1880–1914, as a new class of plutocrats emerged from industry and finance.

=== Recessions ===
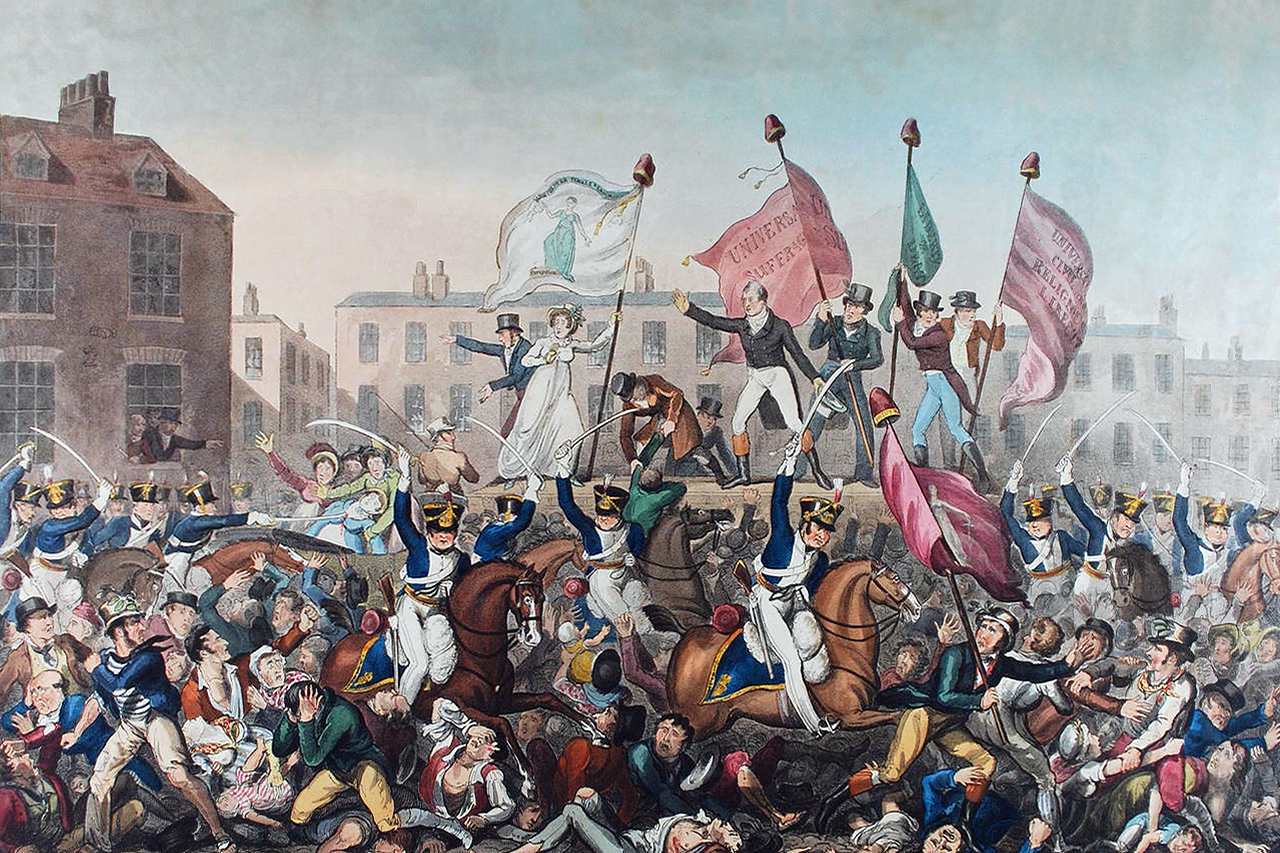
The Peterloo Massacre of 1819

Britain's 19th century economic growth was beset by frequent and sometimes severe recessions. The Post-Napoleonic depression following the end of the Wars in 1815 was induced by several years of poor harvests, which were aggravated by the Corn Laws of 1815. This law set high tariffs on imported foodstuffs, keeping the cost of grain artificially high while wages were declining. As early as 1816, the high cost of grain caused famine and unrest in areas such as East Anglia and the North of England, where rioters seized grain stores and attacked the homes of suspected profiteers and merchants. The high food prices caused an overall slump in consumption and consequently in industrial production and employment. The discontent of the workers culminated in the disastrous confrontation with the authorities at the Peterloo Massacre of 1819, when British cavalry rode headfirst into a crowd of 60,000 to 80,000 protesters in Manchester, killing 5 and wounding as many as 700 people.

The recession of the "Hungry Forties" was similar in its nature to that of the 1820s. Like that of the years following 1815, the 1840s recession was caused by a series of bad harvests, this time from a blight affecting potatoes facilitated by unusually wet and cold conditions in Northern Europe. Ireland, where the population was heavily dependent on potatoes for subsistence, was the worst affected. On mainland Britain, regions of the Scottish Highlands and the Outer Hebrides were worst affected by the potato blight (some parts were depopulated by as much as 50%). The Corn Laws inhibited the ability of the British government to import food for the starving in Ireland and Scotland, which led the Tory Prime Minister Sir Robert Peel to defy the landed interests in Parliament and force the abolition of the Corn Laws in June 1846. The abolition was only accomplished in phases through 1849, by which time Ireland and the Highlands had lost much of their populations to famine or emigration. Relief funding by the British government for the famine in Ireland was dramatically cut in 1847 because of the financial crisis that year. Many blamed the crisis on Peel's wider economic policy but the repeal of the Corn Laws, combined with the astronomic growth of the railways, served to lift Britain out of recession in the 1850s, providing the basis for steady growth in population and output over the next few decades.

=== Railways ===
The British invented the modern railway system and exported it to the world. This emerged from Britain's elaborate system of canals and roadways, which both used horses to haul coal. Domestic consumption in household heaths remained an important market though coal also fired the new steam engines installed in textile factories. Britain furthermore had the engineers and entrepreneurs needed to create and finance a railway system. In 1815, George Stephenson invented the modern steam locomotive, launching a technological race: bigger, more powerful locomotives using higher and higher steam pressures. Stephenson's key innovation came when he integrated all the components of a railways system in 1825 by opening the Stockton and Darlington line. It demonstrated it was commercially feasible to have a system of usable length. London poured money into railway building—a veritable bubble, but one with permanent value.

Thomas Brassey brought British railway engineering to the world, with construction crews that in the 1840s employed 75,000 men across Europe. Every nation copied the British model. Brassey expanded throughout the British Empire and Latin America. His companies invented and improved thousands of mechanical devices, and developed the science of civil engineering to build roadways, tunnels and bridges.

The telegraph, although invented and developed separately, proved essential for the internal communications of the railways. They allowed slower trains to pull over as express trains raced through; made it possible to use a single track for two-way traffic, and to locate where repairs were needed.

In the early period, recognition of the potential of the railways along with led to a period of speculation and investment referred to as Railway Mania. The boom years were 1836 and 1845–47, when Parliament authorised 8,000 miles of railways with a projected future total of £200 million; that about equalled one year of Britain's GDP. Once a charter was obtained, there was little government regulation, as laissez faire and private ownership had become accepted practices. Britain had a superior financial system based in London that funded both the railways in Britain and also in many other parts of the world, including the United States, up until 1914.

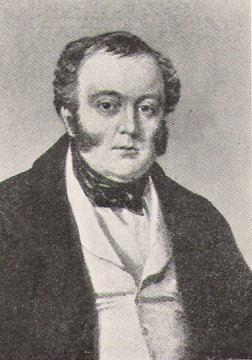
George Hudson

Isambard Kingdom Brunel (1806–1859) designed the first major railway, the Great Western, built originally in the 1830s to cover the 100 miles from London to Bristol. Even more important was the highly controversial George Hudson. He became Britain's "railway king" by merging numerous short lines. Since there was no government agency supervising the railways, Hudson set up a system that all the lines adopted called the Railway Clearing House. It made interconnections easy for people and freight by standardising routines for transferring freight and people between companies, and loaning out freight cars. By 1849 Hudson controlled nearly 30% of Britain's trackage. Hudson did away with accountants and manipulated funds—paying large dividends out of capital because profits were quite low, but no one knew that until his system collapsed and the railway bubble of the late 1840s burst.

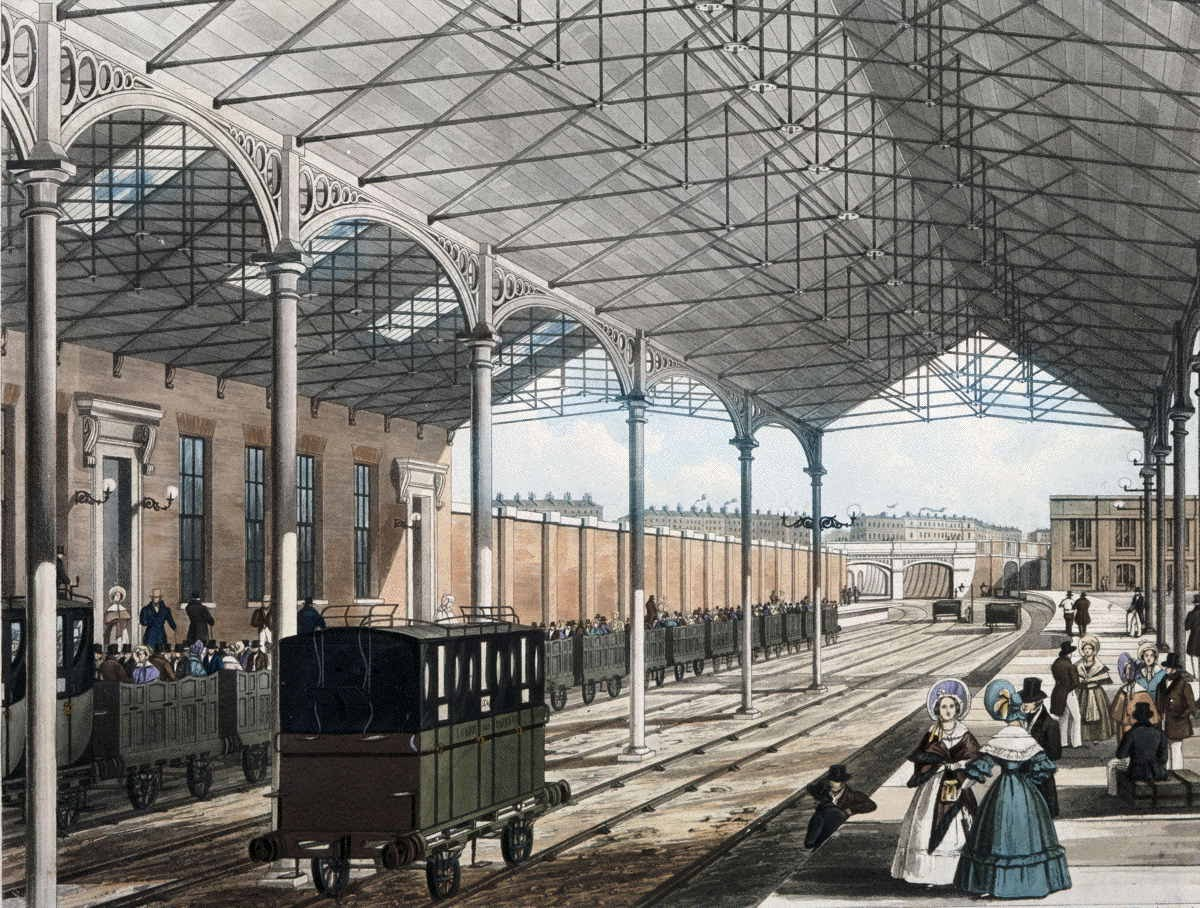
Euston station in London, 1837. Note the open passenger carriages.

By 1850 Britain had a well integrated, well engineered system that provided fast, on-time, inexpensive movement of freight and people to every city and most rural districts. Freight rates had plunged to a penny a ton mile for coal. The system directly or indirectly employed tens of thousands of engineers, conductors, mechanics, repairmen, accountants, station agents and managers, bringing a new level of business sophistication that could be applied to many other industries, and helping many small and large businesses to expand their role in the industrial revolution. Thus railways had a tremendous impact on industrialisation. By lowering transportation costs, they reduced costs for all industries moving supplies and finished goods, and they increased demand for the production of all the inputs needed for the railway system itself. The system kept growing; by 1880, there were 13,500 locomotives which each carried 97,800 passengers a year, or 31,500 tons of freight.

=== Second Industrial Revolution ===
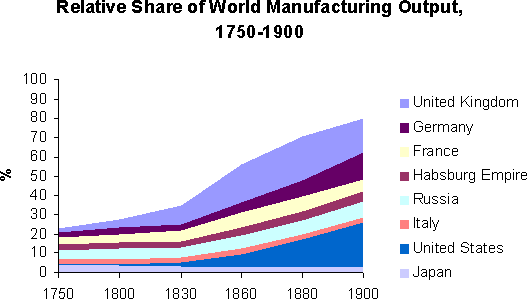

During the First Industrial Revolution, the industrialist replaced the merchant as the dominant figure in the capitalist system. In the later decades of the 19th century, when the ultimate control and direction of large industry came into the hands of financiers, industrial capitalism gave way to financial capitalism and the corporation. The establishment of behemoth industrial empires, whose assets were controlled and managed by men divorced from production, was a dominant feature of this third phase. By the middle of the 19th century, as the world's only fully industrialised nation, British output represented just under half the total of the world's industrial capacity.

New products and services were also introduced which greatly increased international trade. Improvements in steam engine design and the wide availability of cheap iron (and after 1870 steel) meant that slow, sailing ships could be replaced with steamships, such as Brunel's SS Great Western. Electricity and chemical industries became important although Britain lagged behind the U.S. and Germany.

Amalgamation of industrial cartels into larger corporations, mergers and alliances of separate firms, and technological advancement (particularly the increased use of electric power and internal combustion engines fuelled by petrol) were mixed blessings for British business during the late Victorian era. The ensuing development of more intricate and efficient machines along with mass production techniques greatly expanded output and lowered production costs. As a result, production often exceeded domestic demand. Among the new conditions, more markedly evident in Britain, the forerunner of Europe's industrial states, were the long-term effects of the severe Long Depression of 1873–1896, which had followed fifteen years of great economic instability. Businesses in practically every industry suffered from lengthy periods of low – and falling – profit rates and price deflation after 1873.

By the 1870s, financial houses in London had achieved an unprecedented level of control over industry. This contributed to increasing concerns among policy-makers over the protection of British investments overseas – particularly those in the securities of foreign governments and in foreign-government-backed development activities, such as railways. Although it had been official British policy to support such investments, with the large expansion of these investments in the 1860s, and the economic and political instability of many areas of investment (such as Egypt), calls upon the government for methodical protection became increasingly pronounced in the years leading up to the Crystal Palace Speech. At the end of the Victorian era, the service sector (banking, insurance and shipping, for example) began to gain prominence at the expense of manufacturing. During the late 18th century the United Kingdom experienced stronger increases in the service sector than in the industrial sector; industry grew by only 2 per cent, whereas the service sector employment increased by 9 per cent.

=== Foreign trade ===
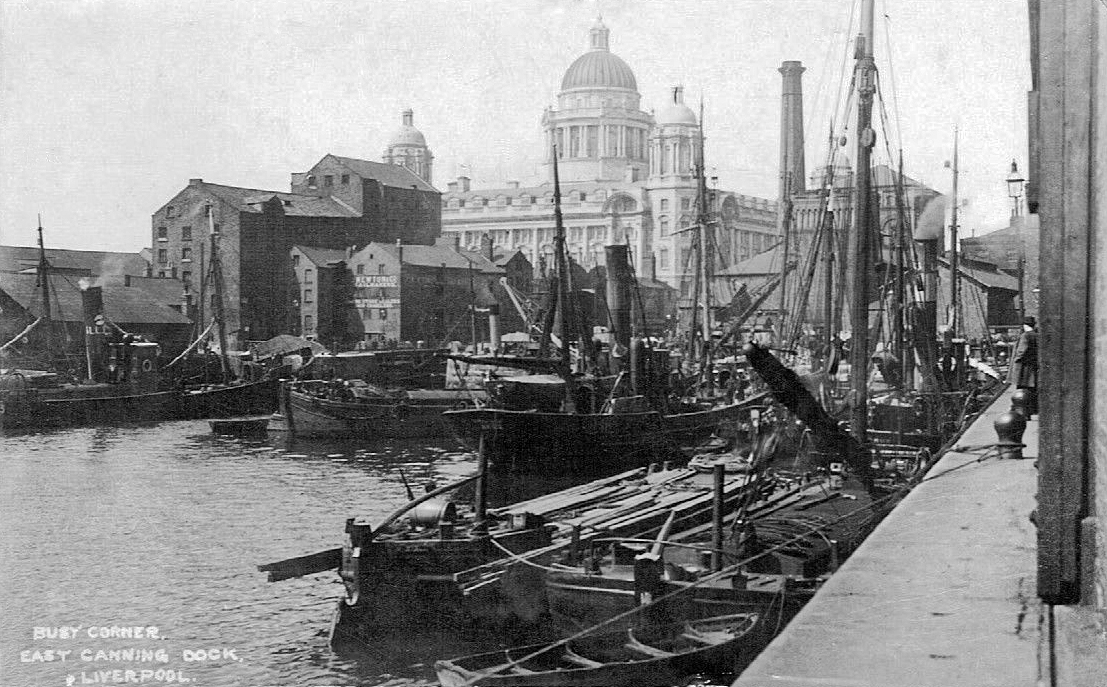
Canning Dock, Liverpool c. 1910, the "Second City" of the British Empire

Foreign trade tripled in volume between 1870 and 1914; most of the activity occurred with other industrialised countries. Britain ranked as the world's largest trading nation in 1860, but by 1913 it had lost ground to both the United States and Germany: British and German exports in the latter year each totalled $2.3 billion, and those of the United States exceeded $2.4 billion. Although her own exports were diminishing in comparison to her rivals, Britain remained the world's largest trading nation by a significant margin: in 1914 her import and export totals were larger by a third compared to Germany, and larger by 50 per cent compared to the United States. Britain was a top importer of foodstuffs, raw materials, and finished goods, much of which were re-exported to Europe or the United States. In 1880 Britain purchased about half the world total in traded tea, coffee, and wheat, and just under half of the world's meat exports. In that same year, more than 50 per cent of world shipping was British owned, while British shipyards were constructing about four fifths of the world's new vessels in the 1890s.

Its extensive trading contacts, investments in agriculture, and merchant shipping fleet enabled it to trade in a great volume of commodities remotely – transactions were concluded with foreign clients from London or other British cities over distant commodities like coffee, tea, cotton, rubber, and sugar. Proportionally, even though trade volumes trebled between 1870 and 1914, the British share of the world market was actually shrinking. In 1880, 23 per cent of world trade was British-owned – by 1910 it was 17 per cent. As foreign trade increased, so in proportion did the amount of it going outside the Continent. In 1840, £7.7 million of its export and £9.2 million of its import trade was done outside Europe; in 1880 the figures were £38.4 million and £73 million. Europe's economic contacts with the wider world were multiplying, much as Britain's had been doing for years. In many cases, colonial control followed private investment, particularly in raw materials and agriculture. Intercontinental trade between North and South constituted a higher proportion of global trade in this era than in the late 20th century period of globalisation.

==== American invasion and British response ====
The American "invasion" of some sections of the British home market for manufactured goods prompted a commercial response. Tariffs, despite sustained political campaign for Protection in the first decade of the twentieth century, were only imposed generally after the collapse of the world trade in 1930. In this competitive milieu, British businessmen modernised their operations; for example, manufactures of boots and shoes faced increasing imports of American footwear and Americans entered the market for shoe-making machinery. British shoe-makers realised that to meet this competition it was necessary to re-examine their traditional methods of work, labour utilisation, and industrial relations; they also had to be more responsive to the demands of fashion.

=== Export of capital ===
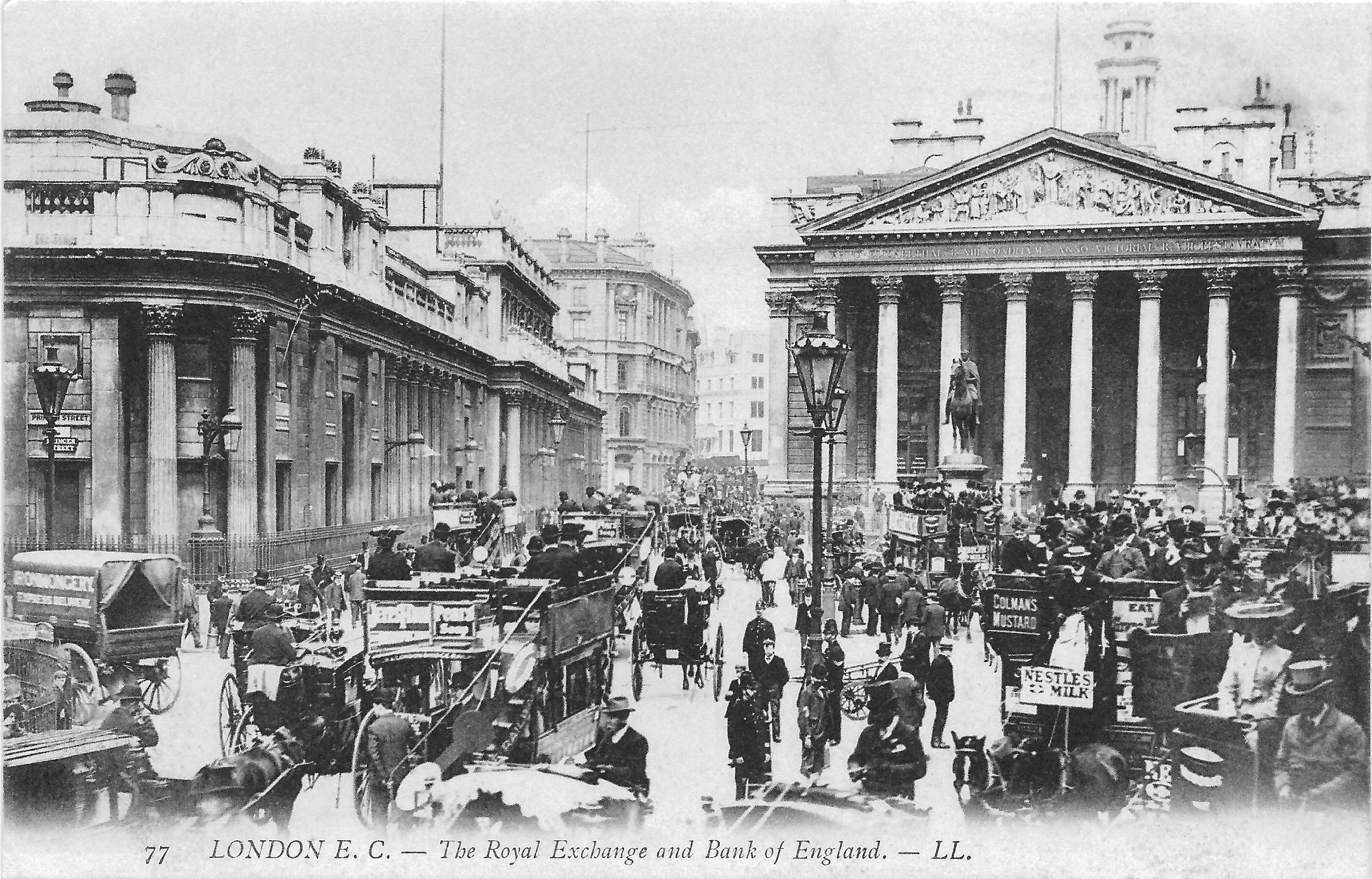
The Royal Exchange and Bank of England ca. 1910, at the heart of the City of London

The City of London strengthened its position as the world's financial capital, the export of capital was a major base of the British economy 1880 to 1913, the "golden era" of international finance. By 1913 about 50% of capital investment throughout the world had been raised in London, making Britain the largest exporter of capital by a wide margin. Although the British trade deficit widened (£27 million in 1851, by 1911 it was £134 million), earnings from investment and financial services more than closed the gap and generated a substantial Balance of Payments surplus. Part of the reason for the initial boom in financial services was because manufacturing became less profitable beginning in the 1880s, due to the largely depressed world market of these years, combined with the expansion of manufacturing in the United States and Germany. With foreign competition in some manufacturing sectors fiercer than in mid-century, British industrialists and financiers more profitably invested increasing quantities of capital abroad. In 1911, income from overseas investments amounted to £188 million; income from services like insurance, shipping, and banking totalled some £152 million. It is indicative of the notable shift to financial services that between 1900 and 1913 total British investment abroad doubled, increasing from £2 billion to £4 billion.

British overseas investment was especially impressive in the independent nations of Latin America, which were eager for infrastructure improvements, such as railways and ports, that were often built by British contracting firms, and telegraph and telephone systems. Contemporaneously, British merchants dominated international trade in Latin America. Inevitably, not all these investments paid off; for example, many British investors suffered substantial losses after investing in railway companies in the United States that went bankrupt, while even some mining ventures in the Sudan also proved unprofitable.

=== Business practices ===
Big business grew much more slowly in Britain than in the United States, with the result that by the late 19th century the much larger American corporations were growing faster and could undersell the smaller competitors in Britain. A key was the vertical integration. In the United States, the typical firm expanded by reaching backward into the supply chain and forward into the distribution system. In the Ford Motor Company, raw iron and coal went in one end, and Model Ts were delivered by local dealers at the other end, whereas British firms did not try to own the sources of raw materials; they bought on the market. Instead of setting up their own distribution system they worked with well-established wholesalers. The British businessmen were much more comfortable in a smaller niche, even though it made it much harder to lower costs and prices. Furthermore, the Americans had a rapidly growing home market, and investment capital was much more readily available. British businessmen typically used their savings not to expand their business but to purchase highly prestigious country estates – they looked to the landed country gentry for their role model, whereas Americans looked to the multi-millionaires. Crystal Palace hosted a world class industrial exhibition in 1851 in London. It was a marvelous display of the latest achievements in material progress, clearly demonstrating British superiority. The Americans were impressed, and repeatedly opened world–class industrial exhibits. By contrast, the British never repeated their success. In 1886 British sociologist Herbert Spencer commented: "Absorbed by his activities, and spurred on by his unrestricted ambitions, the American is a less happy being than the inhabitant of a country where the possibilities of success are very much smaller."

==== Organisation ====
As industrialisation took effect in the late 18th and early 19th century, the United Kingdom possessed a strong national government that provided a standard currency, an efficient legal system, efficient taxation, and effective support for overseas enterprise both within the British Empire and in independent nations. Parliament repealed medieval laws that restricted business enterprise, such as specification of how many threads could be in a woollen cloth, or regulating interest rates. Taxation fell primarily on landed wealth, not accumulated capital nor income. In 1825 Parliament repealed the Bubble Act 1720 and facilitated capital accumulation. After the General Enclosure Act 1801, farming became more productive and fed the growing urban industrial workforce. The Navigation Acts remained important into the 1820s, and enforced by the Royal Navy, facilitated international trade. The road system was developed through government-sponsored local turnpikes. However, there were few examples of government-financed canals, and none of railroads, unlike early major transport projects in Japan, in Russia, or in the mid-19th century USA.

Evidence from Lever Brothers, Royal Dutch Shell, and Burroughs Wellcome indicates that after 1870 individual entrepreneurship by top leaders was critical in fostering the growth of direct foreign investment and the rise to prominence of multinational corporations. In 1929, the first modern multinational company emerged when a merger of Dutch Margarine Unie and British soapmaker Lever Brothers resulted in Unilever. With 250,000 people employed, and in terms of market value, Unilever was the largest industrial company in Europe. However, after 1945 the importance of entrepreneurship declined in British business.

==== Accounting ====
New business practices in the areas of management and accounting made possible the more efficient operation of large companies. For example, in steel, coal, and iron companies 19th-century accountants used sophisticated, fully integrated accounting systems to calculate output, yields, and costs to satisfy management information requirements. South Durham Steel and Iron was a large horizontally integrated company that operated mines, mills, and shipyards. Its management used traditional accounting methods with the goal of minimising production costs, and thus raising its profitability. By contrast one of its competitors, Cargo Fleet Iron introduced mass production milling techniques through the construction of modern plants. Cargo Fleet set high production goals and developed an innovative but complicated accounting system to measure and report all costs throughout the production process. However, problems in obtaining coal supplies and the failure to meet the firm's production goals forced Cargo Fleet to drop its aggressive system and return to the sort of approach South Durham Steel was using.

=== Imperialism ===
After the loss of the American colonies in 1776, Britain built a "Second British Empire", based in colonies in India, Asia, Australia, Canada. The crown jewel was India, where in the 1750s a private British company, with its own army, the East India Company (or "John Company"), took control of parts of India. The 19th century saw Company rule extended across India after expelling the Dutch, French and Portuguese. By the 1830s the company was a government and had given up most of its business in India, but it was still privately owned. Following the Indian Rebellion of 1857 the government closed down the company and took control of British India and the company's Presidency Armies.

Free trade (with no tariffs and few trade barriers) was introduced in the 1840s. Protected by the overwhelming power of the Royal Navy, the economic empire included very close economic ties with independent nations in Latin America. The informal economic empire has been called "The Imperialism of Free Trade."

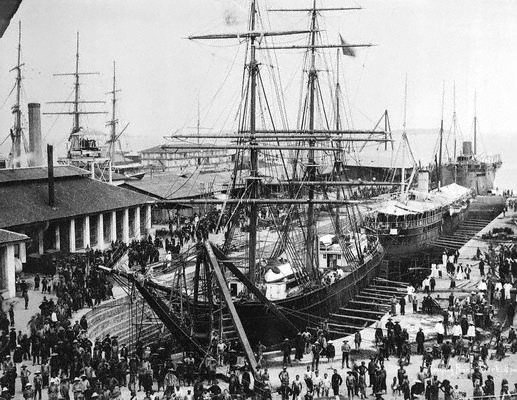
Singapore docks in the 1890s

Numerous independent entrepreneurs expanded the Empire, such as Stamford Raffles of the East India Company who founded the port of Singapore in 1819. Businessmen eager to sell Indian opium in the vast China market led to the Opium War (1839–1842) and the establishment of British colonies at Hong Kong. One adventurer, James Brooke, set himself up as the Rajah of the Kingdom of Sarawak in North Borneo in 1842; his realm joined the Empire in 1888. Cecil Rhodes set up an economic empire of diamonds in South Africa that proved highly profitable. There were great riches in gold and diamonds but this venture led to expensive wars with the Dutch settlers known as Boers.

The possessions of the East India Company in India, under the direct rule of the Crown from 1857 —known as British India— was the centrepiece of the Empire, and because of an efficient taxation system it paid its own administrative expenses as well as the cost of the large British Indian Army. In terms of trade, however, India turned only a small profit for British business. However, transfers to the British government was massive: in 1801 unrequited (unpaid, or paid from Indian-collected revenue) was about 30% of British domestic savings available for capital formation in Britain.

There was pride and glory in the Empire, as talented young Britons vied for positions in the Indian Civil Service and for similar overseas career opportunities. The opening of the Suez Canal in 1869 was a vital economic and military link. Britain continued to expand their control in areas strategically important to the link with India, including Egypt and Cyprus.

Cain and Hopkins argue that the phases of expansion abroad were closely linked with the development of the domestic economy. Therefore, the shifting balance of social and political forces under imperialism and the varying intensity of Britain's economic and political rivalry with other powers need to be understood with reference to domestic policies. Gentlemen capitalists, representing Britain's landed gentry and London's service sectors and financial institutions, largely shaped and controlled Britain's imperial enterprises in the 19th and early 20th centuries. Industrial leaders played a lesser role and found themselves dependent on the gentlemen capitalists.

=== Long Depression ===
The last and longest lasting of the 19th century recessions was the Long Depression, which began with the financial Panic of 1873 and induced a twenty three-year period of worldwide anemic growth and recession cycles which only ended in the late 1890s. The bursting of a railroad speculation bubble in the United States, heavily financed via London, was a major factor in the initial shock. British foreign investment fell sharply, but it took some years for record high domestic investments to fall as well. The initial Depression lasted between 1873 and 1879, and was marked above all by price deflation, and therefore declining profitability for industrialists and financiers. Shrinking returns and a generally unfavorable economic climate meant that investment as a percentage of Britain's National wealth, both overseas and at home, fell from an average of 12.6% between 1870 and 1874, to 9.7% between 1875 and 1896. The sluggish world market, which was at its weakest in the 1880s, was keenly felt in the export-reliant economy of the UK. British quinquennial export averages did not return to their pre-1873 levels (£235 million between 1870 and 1874) until 1895–99, slumping to £192 million in 1879. The recovery, moreover, was weaker than the mid-century growth in exports, because British manufactures were struggling to compete with domestically produced products in nations like Germany and the United States, where steep exclusionary tariffs had been enforced in response to the economic crisis. Prices on commodities in Britain fell as much as 40% in the 1870s, with a downward pressure on wages which led to a general perception among the working classes of financial hardship and decline.

To a great extent, Britain's economic difficulties were symptomatic of structural weaknesses that were beginning to manifest themselves by the 1870s. Economists have explained the relative slowdown in growth during the latter 19th century in terms of the Neoclassical growth model, in which the momentum from decades of growth was reaching an inevitable slow down. Endogenous growth theory suggests that this slowdown was attributable to national institutions and conditions, such as entrepreneurship, natural resources, and outward investment, rather than subject to a naturally occurring external model. It is not surprising then, that countries with markedly larger natural resources, and larger populations to draw from, should have overtaken the UK in terms of production by the end of the nineteenth century. Britain depended on imports to supplement her deficiencies of some natural resources, but the high cost of shipping made this impracticable when competing against the resource-rich giant, the United States. The result was clearly measured: the UK averaged 1.8% annual growth between 1873 and 1913, while the United States and Germany averaged 4.8% and 3.9% per annum respectively. Historians have criticised cultural and educational factors for contributing to a decline in the "entrepreneurial spirit" which had characterised the Industrial Revolution. The offspring of first and second-generation industrialists in the late 19th-century, raised in privilege and educated at aristocratically dominated public schools, showed little interest in adopting their father's occupations because of the stigma attached to working in manufacturing or "trade". Moreover, the curricula of the public schools and universities was overwhelmingly centered on the study of Classics, which left students ill-prepared to innovate in the manufacturing world. Many turned away from industry and entered the more "gentlemanly" financial sector, the law courts, or the civil service of the Empire.

However, the statistical evidence counters any perception of economic stagnation in the latter 19th century: the employed labour force grew, unemployment in the years 1874–1890 only averaged 4.9%, and productivity continued to rise after the 1870s recession, albeit at a lower annual rate of 1%, compared to 2% in the years preceding the Panic of 1873. Moreover, because of the decline in prices overall, living standards improved markedly during the "Long Depression" decades. Real GDP per capita fluctuated by the year, but as a whole rose steadily from $3870 in 1873 to $5608 by 1900, exceeding all nations in terms of per capita wealth except Australia and the United States. The heavy investment levels of pre-1873 began to yield returns, so that British income from abroad surpassed outward investment and created a steady surplus to support the widening balance of trade. The export of capital investment, even though it occupied a smaller percentage of the national wealth, recovered briskly beginning in 1879, reaching record highs in the following decade (£56.15 million between 1876 and 1895, compared to £33.74 between 1851 and 1874). The trend towards investing British capital abroad in the late 19th century (about 35% of British assets were held abroad by 1913) has been blamed for essentially starving native industry of investment which could have been used to maintain competitiveness and increase productivity.

One of the causes for the 1873 panic was attributed to overproduction in industry. British industrialists believed they had produced more than could be sold on saturated domestic and overseas markets, so they began to lobby the British government and public opinion to expand the British Empire. According to this theory, Britain's trade deficit could be corrected, and excess production absorbed, by these new markets. The result was the Scramble for Africa, the aggressive competition for territory between Britain and her European competitors which occurred in the 1880s.

== 1900–1945 ==
By 1900, the United States and Germany had experienced industrialisation on a scale comparable to that achieved in the United Kingdom and were also developing large-scale manufacturing companies; Britain's comparative economic advantage had lessened. The City of London remained the financial and commercial capital of the world, until challenged by New York after 1918.

=== 1900–1914 ===
The Edwardian era (1901–1910) stands out as a period of peace and plenty. There were no severe depressions and prosperity was widespread. Britain's growth rate, manufacturing output, and GDP (but not GDP per capita) fell behind its rivals the United States, and Germany. Nevertheless, the nation still led the world in trade, finance and shipping, and had strong bases in manufacturing and mining. Growth in the mining sector was strong and the coal industry played a significant role as the focus of the world's energy market; this prominence was to be challenged after the First World War by the growth of the oil industry and continuing development of the internal combustion engine. Although the relative contribution of the agricultural sector was becoming less important, productivity in the British agriculture sector was relatively high.

By international standards, and across all sectors of the United Kingdom, the British services sectors exhibited high labour factor productivity and, especially, total factor productivity; as was to be even more the case one hundred years later, it was the services sectors that provided the British economy's relative advantage in 1900.

It has been suggested that the industrial sector was slow to adjust to global changes, and that there was a striking preference for leisure over industrial entrepreneurship among the elite. In 1910, the British Empire's share of world industrial capacity stood at 15%, just behind Germany's 16%, and less than half of the United States' 35%. Despite signs of relative weakness in certain sectors of the UK economy, the major achievements of the Edwardian years should be underlined. The city was the financial centre of the world—far more efficient and wide-ranging than New York, Paris or Berlin. British investment abroad doubled in the Edwardian years, from £2 billion in 1900 to £4 billion in 1913. Britain had built up a vast reserve of overseas credits in its formal Empire, as well as in its informal empire in Latin America and other nations. The British held huge financial holdings in the United States, especially in railways. These assets proved vital in paying for supplies in the first years of the World War. Social amenities, especially in urban centres, were accumulating – prosperity was highly visible. Among the working class there was a growing demand for access to a greater say in government, but the level of industrial unrest on economic issues only became significant about 1908. In large part, it was the demands of the coal miners and railway workers, as articulated by their trade unions, that prompted a high level of strike activity in the years immediately before the First World War.

=== Labour Movement ===
The rise of a powerful, concerted, and politically effective labour movement was one of the major socio-economic phenomena of the Edwardian years in the UK. Trade union membership more than doubled during this time, from 2 million people in 1901 to 4.1 million in 1913. The Labour Party for the first time gained an active foothold in Parliament with the election of 30 Labour MPs in the 1906 General Election, enabling greater advocacy for the interests of the working classes as a whole.

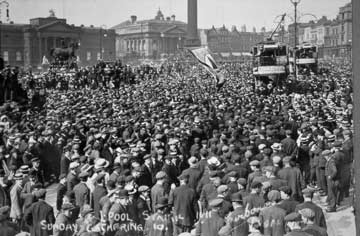
Striking dock workers in Liverpool gathered for a protest during the summer of 1911.

Inflation and stagnating wages began in 1908, which precipitated greater discontent among the working classes, particularly as the prosperity enjoyed by the middle and upper classes was becoming ever more visible. In that year, strikes increased precipitously, mainly in the cotton and shipbuilding industries where job-cuts had occurred. In 1910, with unemployment reaching a record-low of 3 per cent, unions were emboldened by their bargaining power to make demands for higher wages and job stability. Strikes erupted throughout the nation – in the coal mining country of Wales and northeast England, the latter also experiencing a sustained railway workers' strike. In 1911 the National Transport Workers' Federation organised the first nationwide railway workers' strike, along with a general dockworker's strike in ports throughout the country. In Liverpool, the summertime strikes of the dock and transport workers culminated in a series of conflicts with the authorities between 13 and 15 August, leading to the death of two men and over 350 injured. In 1912 the National coal strike and another wave of transportation strikes cost the British economy an estimated 40 million working days.

The major demands of the labour movement during these years were wage-rises, a national minimum wage, and greater stability in employment. The Liberal government in London did make some concessions in response to the demands of organised labour, most notably with the Trade Boards Act 1909, which empowered boards to set minimum wage requirements for workers, oversee working conditions, and limit working hours. At first this applied to a very limited number of industries like lace-making and finishing, but in 1912 boards were created for the coal mining industry and within a few years all "sweated labour" occupations were overseen by such boards, guaranteeing minimum wages and safer work environments. The coal strike of 1912 was so disruptive that the British government guaranteed a minimum wage for miners with separate legislation, the Coal Mines (Minimum Wage) Act 1912.

=== Tariff Reform ===
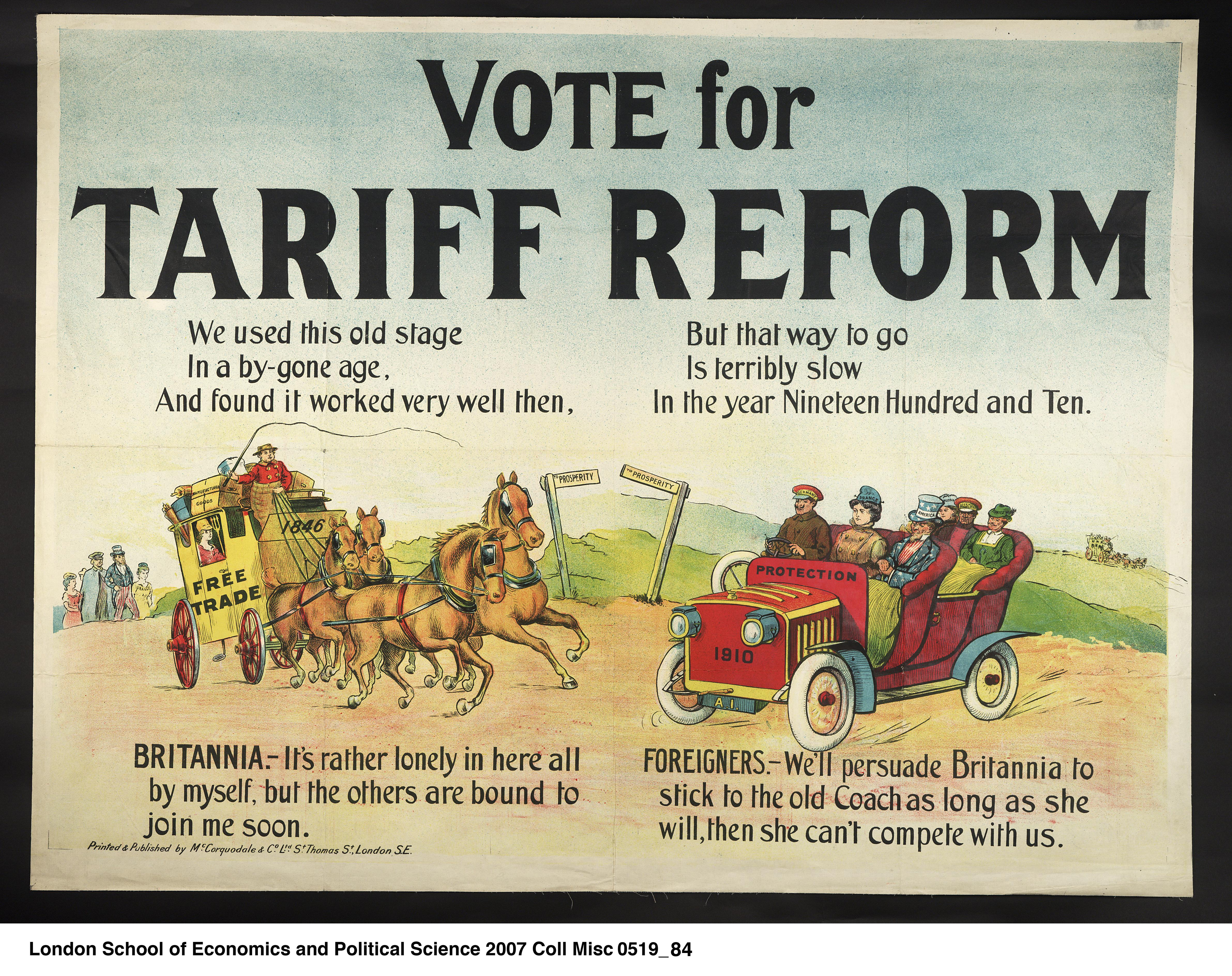
A Tariff Reform poster from 1910, encouraging Protectionism over the Free Trade of the Victorian Era

In Edwardian Britain, proposals for more protectionist tariff policies which had begun in the 1890s became a mass political movement with high visibility. The Tariff Reform League, founded in 1903 and headed by Britain's most outspoken champion of protectionism, Joseph Chamberlain, pushed for the implementation of tariffs to protect British goods in domestic and Imperial markets. Tariff reformers like Chamberlain were worried by what was seen as a deluge of American and German products entering the domestic market; they argued that part of the reason for the success of the U.S. and German economies were the national tariffs each imposed to protect fledgling industries from foreign competition. Without tariffs, it was claimed, vulnerable young industries like electrical goods, automobiles, and chemicals would never gain traction in Britain.

A major goal of the Tariff Reform League was the foundation of an Imperial Customs Union, which would create a closed trade bloc in the British Empire and, it was hoped, fully integrate the economies of Britain and her overseas possessions. Under such an arrangement, Britain would maintain a reciprocal relationship whereby she would purchase raw materials from her colonies, the profits of which would allow them to buy finished goods from Britain, enriching both sides. Although it was a highly publicised and well-funded campaign, Tariff Reform never gained traction with the public at large. The defeat of Chamberlain's Liberal Unionist Party in the 1906 General Election, which returned a huge majority for free-trade stalwarts in the Liberal and Labour parties, was a resounding blow to the movement's electoral hopes, although the campaign itself persisted through the rest of the Edwardian period.

=== First World War ===
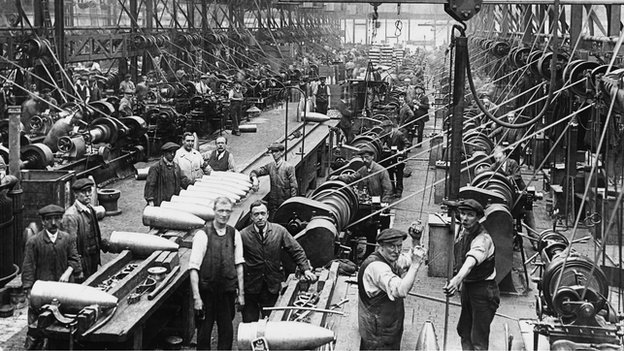
English factory workers producing shells for the war effort during the First World War

The First World War saw a decline of economic production, with a major reallocation to munitions. It forced Britain to use up its financial reserves and borrow large sums from the U.S. Because of its prime importance in international finance, the entry of the UK into the war in August 1914 threatened a possible worldwide liquidity crisis. In Britain itself, there were fears of a run on the banks, which prompted the Treasury to take inflationary measures and begin printing 5 million new banknotes a day. To assuage nervous markets, a one-month moratorium on payments was declared, while the Bank of England agreed to guarantee the City of London's bills of exchange and to act as underwriter for London's Clearing houses.

Shipments of American raw materials and food allowed Britain to feed itself and its army while maintaining her productivity. The financing was generally successful, as the city's strong financial position minimised the damaging effects of inflation, as opposed to much worse conditions in Germany. Spending by the UK in the US, on everything from food to munitions, occupied 40% of total British war expenditure by 1916. The banking house J.P. Morgan & Co. won a concession in January 1915 to act as the sole purchasing agent for the Admiralty and War Department in the United States. $20 billion worth of trade was undertaken in this way by the end of 1916. Until February 1917, J.P. Morgan was also Britain's agent for all dollar loans raised in the United States.

Overall consumer consumption declined 18% from 1914 to 1919. To raise vital funds for the war effort, taxation also increased dramatically. Whereas before the war the majority of tax revenue was derived from indirect taxation, by 1920 60% of tax revenue was from income and "super tax" levies, like the one imposed on incomes over £10,000. Income tax had stood at just 6% before the war and only applied to 1.13 million Britons, by 1920 there were 3 million income tax payers at a rate of 30%. Britain also exploited its imperial resources to raise capital: India's 1917 excess export earnings were appropriated through a gift of £100 million to the British war effort. In 1918 another £45 million was appropriated to support the war.

Trade unions were encouraged as membership grew from 4.1 million in 1914 to 6.5 million in 1918, peaking at 8.3 million in 1920 before relapsing to 5.4 million in 1923. In Scotland, the shipbuilding industry expanded by a third. Women were available and many entered munitions factories and took other home front jobs vacated by men.

=== Interwar stagnation ===
The human and material losses of the World War in Britain were enormous. They included 745,000 servicemen killed and 24,000 civilians, with 1.7 million wounded. The total of lost shipping came to 7.9 million tons (much of it replaced by new construction), and £7,500 million in financial costs to the Empire. Germany owed billions in reparations, but Britain in turn owed the U.S. billions in loan repayments.

In 1919–1920 there was a short-lived boom in the British economy, caused by a rush of investment pent-up during the war years and another rush of orders for new shipping to replace the millions of tons lost. However, with the end of war orders, a serious depression hit the economy by 1921–22. Exports fell to half of their 1913 levels, and unemployment peaked at 17%. Factors explaining the economic depression are on one hand the return to prewar gold standard at parity or upcoming structural problems to the northern industrial core of the UK. Another factor contributing to the relative decline of British industry during the 1920s was the loss of Britain's export markets, mostly in the Far East and Latin America. The diversion of shipping and production towards the war effort between 1914 and 1918 meant that regional producers like the United States in Latin America or Japan in the Far East usurped important markets for British goods. Britain never regained its pre-1914 export volumes, by 1929 exports were still only 80% of what they had been in 1913.

Indeed, even if Britain was far better off compared to the badly battered Continent, economic stagnation lasted the whole decade. Overall growth averaged 1.8% per annum during the 1920s, slightly weaker but comparable to the United States. Slow growth was due in part to Britain's heavy dependence on exports, and world trade grew sluggishly through the 1920s. It was also overly dependent on so-called "staple" industries, those which had brought huge prosperity in the 19th century but by the 1920s were experiencing faltering demand and strong competition from abroad. In 1922, for example, the volume of cotton exports was only about half of what it had been in 1913, while coal exports were only one third of their 1913 levels. The most skilled craftsmen were especially hard hit, because there were few alternative uses for their specialised skills. In depressed areas the main social indicators such as poor health, bad housing, and long-term mass unemployment, pointed to terminal social and economic stagnation at best, or even a downward spiral. The heavy dependence on obsolescent heavy industry and mining was a central problem, and no one offered workable solutions. The despair reflected what Finlay (1994) describes as a widespread sense of hopelessness that prepared local business and political leaders to accept a new orthodoxy of centralised government economic planning when it arrived during the Second World War.

=== Productivity and employment ===
In 1919, Britain reduced the working hours in major industries to a 48-hour week for industrial workers. Historians have debated whether this move depressed labour productivity and contributed to the slump. Scott and Spadavecchia argue that productivity was in some ways enhanced, especially through higher hourly productivity, and that Britain did not suffer in its exports because most other nations also reduced working hours. Looking at coal, cotton, and iron and steel, they find that Britain did not suffer any significant relative productivity loss in these industries. By 1924 workers had regained their productive output of 1913, this while working greatly reduced hours compared to the pre-war years. By 1938 British industrial productivity had increased by 75% compared to pre-1914 levels, even after the setbacks of reduced working hours and the effects of the Great Depression were taken into account.

Monetary policy of postwar governments also contributed to high unemployment. By April 1925, years of stringent deflationary policies by the British Exchequer had accomplished the intended goal of returning the Pound Sterling to its pre-war exchange rate of $4.86. This high exchange rate made for cheap consumer prices and a high real wage for UK workers. However, interest rates were also high as a result, making the cost of doing business all the more expensive, while high labour costs were inevitably offset by employers with layoffs and reduced hiring.

By 1921, more than 3 million Britons were unemployed as a result of the postwar economic downturn. While the economy was recovering by 1922–1923, the UK found itself struggling again by 1926, the general strike of that year doing it no favours. Growth for the remainder of the decade became erratic, with brief periods of stagnation constantly interrupting growth. Industrial relations briefly improved, but then came the Wall Street stock market crash in October 1929, which sparked the worldwide Great Depression (See the Great Depression in the United Kingdom). Unemployment had stood at less than 1.8 million at the end of 1930, but by the end of 1931 it had risen sharply to more than 2.6 million. By January 1933, more than 3 million Britons were unemployed, accounting for more than 20% of the workforce – with unemployment topping 50% in some parts of the country, particularly in South Wales and the north-east of England. The rest of the 1930s saw a moderate economic recovery stimulated by private housing. The rate of unemployment fell to 10% in 1938 – half of the level five years previously.

=== Steel ===
From 1800 to 1870, Britain produced more than half of the world's pig iron, and its ironmasters continued to develop new steel making processes. In 1880, Britain produced 1.3 million tons of steel, 3 million tons in 1893 and by 1914 output was 8 million tons. Germany caught up in 1893 and produced 14 million tons in 1914. After 1900, as the U.S. became the world's leading steel producing economy, British metallurgists pioneered the commercial development of special steels. Academic experts, such as Professor Oliver Arnold led research into the development of phospho-magnetic steels and other specialised high-strength alloys, using the electric furnace and other innovations, as well as reducing smoke pollution. The industry trained a cadre of experts that made large firms scientifically progressive. The leaders of the world's leading iron and steel companies continued to look to the London-based Iron and Steel Institute for the dissemination of cutting-edge scientific and technical research.

=== Coal ===
Politics became a central issue for the coal miners who contributed significantly to the growth of the labour and co-operative movements in major industrial centres such as South Yorkshire (including Sheffield), the West Midlands (the Black Country), Bristol, the Valleys of South Wales (Merthyr Tydfil) and the Central Lowlands of Scotland (Paisley); while some rural coal-mining communities could be insular, they also provided the bedrock of the Britain's industrial regions by providing locally produced fuel. 1888 saw the formation of an overarching national organisation for the hitherto regionally based miners' unions, and by 1908 The Miners' Federation of Great Britain had 600,000 members. Many of the policies associated with the Labour Party's 'old left' had roots in coal-mining areas; in particular, the nationalisation of the coal industry.

=== General Strike of 1926 ===
The Spring of 1926 saw the British government refuse to extend again the subsidy that had bought short-term peace for the coal industry. In April 1926 the owners locked out the miners when they rejected the coal mine owners' demands for longer hours and reduced pay. The backdrop to the dispute was a fall in the price of coal, an important element of the general deflationary tendency after the end of the First World War which was exacerbated by the adoption of fuel oil in place of coal. The general strike was led by the Trades Union Congress in support of the coal miners, but it failed. It was a nine-day nationwide walkout of one million railwaymen, transport workers, printers, dockers, ironworkers and steelworkers supporting the 1.5 million coal miners who had been locked out. The government had continued existing subsidies for an additional nine-months subsidy in 1925 seeking to achieve short-term peace in the coal industry. The TUC hope was the government would intervene to reorganise and rationalise the industry, and raise the subsidy. The Conservative government had stockpiled supplies and essential services continued with middle class volunteers. All three major parties opposed the strike. The general strike itself was largely non-violent, but the miners' lockout continued and there was violence in Scotland. It was the only general strike in British history and TUC leaders such as Ernest Bevin considered it a mistake. Most historians treat it as a singular event with few long-term consequences, but Martin Pugh says it accelerated the movement of working-class voters to the Labour Party, which led to future gains. The Trade Disputes and Trade Unions Act 1927 made general strikes illegal and ended the automatic payment of union members to the Labour Party. That act was largely repealed in 1946.

Coal continued as industry in slow decline as the best seams were used up and it became more and more difficult to mine the residue. The Labour government in 1947 nationalised coal with the creation of National Coal Board, giving miners access to control of the mines via their control of the Labour party and the government. By then, however, the best seams had played out and coal mining was headed downward. Coal production was 50 million metric tons in 1850, 149 million in 1880, 269 million in 1910, 228 million in 1940, and 153 million in 1970. The peak year was 1913, with an output of 292 million tons. Mining employed 383,000 men in 1851, 604,000 in 1881, and 1,202,000 in 1911; on the eve of the First World War in the United Kingdom ten workers, one was a coal miner.

=== New industries ===
While Britain remained overly dependent on 'staple' heavy industries, the First World War had the advantage of stimulating production in new industries where the UK had lagged behind before 1914. The interwar years saw new technologies develop at a breakneck pace, creating lucrative new industries including automobile, airplane, and motorbike manufacture. Before the First World War, automobile manufacture in Britain had been a boutique industry limited to producing expensive luxury cars. The industry produced 34,000 vehicles for the year 1913; by 1937 over half a million were being produced. Most of these were affordable models like the Austin 7 (introduced 1921), the Morris Minor (1928), as well as Model A and Model Y cars produced by Ford of Britain. The adoption of streamlined automation processes and the strong competition between manufacturers was responsible for a 50% drop in motorcar prices between the mid 20s and mid 30s, making cars more affordable (over 1 million were owned by 1930).

The chemicals industry, once dominated by Germany and the United States, also thrived in the UK during the interwar years. By 1939 it employed 100,000 people and produced fertilisers, pharmaceuticals, and synthetic materials. Electrical engineering also mushroomed: the establishment of the Central Electricity Board in 1926 enabled a nationwide high-voltage electrical grid to be developed. By 1939 two thirds of homes had electricity supply, which in turn opened up a new consumer market for electrically powered appliances like vacuum cleaners, refrigerators, radios and stoves.

Between 1923 and 1938, the most successful new industries were: automobile production, electrical engineering, mechanical engineering, metal goods, and printing. These created a net total of 557,920 new jobs between 1923 and 1938, some 96% of all new industrial jobs created in the interwar period. These industries were overwhelmingly concentrated in the communities surrounding London and cities in the West Midlands, particularly Coventry and Birmingham, where there was an established workforce skilled in the production of high quality metal goods.

=== 1920s "consumer boom" ===
In spite of the serious problems that plagued heavy industry, the 1920s marked an era of unprecedented growth for the British consumer industry, until then a minor player in the national economy. While not creating a fully-fledged "consumer culture" as in the United States during the same decade, it had an important effect over British society, primarily on the middle classes which gained access to commodities previously reserved for the upper crust, primarily automobiles, ownership rising tenfold during the interwar period (from around 500,000 in 1919 to approximately over 3 million in 1929 and 5 million in 1939). Sales of electric appliances boomed thanks to the rise of consumer-oriented credit and loans. Higher wages and shorter working hours also led to the rise of recreation: Gramophone records, radio (or "the wireless" as it was referred), magazines and cinema became part of everyday life much like sports, primarily football and cricket.

Tourism grew rapidly in the interwar years because of the rapidly rising number of motorised middle-class and lower-middle-class holidaymakers, as well as an influx of American tourists. Seaside resorts like Blackpool, Brighton and Skegness were particularly popular. However, those tourist sites that catered to the very wealthy (which now began holidaying abroad) or were located in depressed areas, all experienced a decline in profits, especially during the Great Depression.

Electricity, gas, plumbing and telephone services became common as well during the decade, even in some working class households. However, those living in the most remote and poorest parts of Britain saw little change in their living standards, with many Britons still living in terraced homes with outdoor toilets as late as the 1960s.

=== 1929–1939: the Great Depression ===
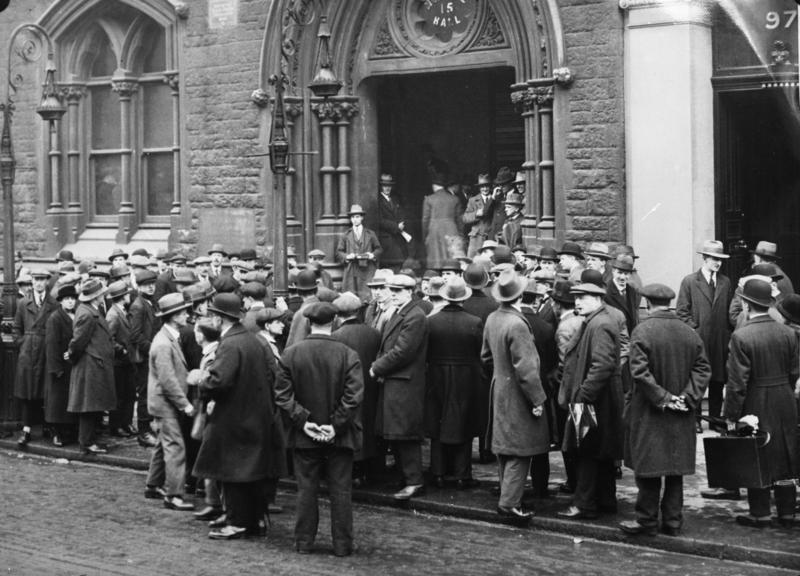
Unemployed people in front of a workhouse in London, 1930

While the Wall Street crash of 1929 had little direct impact on the British stock market, the collapse of the American economy which it had foretold and the associated contraction of world trade seriously affected Britain in the early 1930s. Whereas British politicians had championed the concept of the free market when it was ascendant in the world economy, it gradually withdrew to adopting Tariff Reform as a measure of protectionism. In 1933 Sterling left the Gold Standard. By the early 1930s, the depression again signalled the economic problems the British economy faced. Unemployment soared during this period; from just over 10% in 1929 to more than 20% (or more than 3 million of the workforce) by early 1933. However, it had fallen to 13.9% by the start of 1936. While heavy industry sank to new lows, the consumer industry recovered by 1934 and production increased by 32% between 1933 and 1937. A good indication of the strong consumer market was the growth of retailers during the 1930s. Marks & Spencer, for example, increased its turnover from £2.5 million in 1929 to over £25 million in 1939, necessitating the opening of dozens of new locations to serve the burgeoning demand in the suburbs.

In 1929 Ramsay MacDonald formed his second minority Labour Party government. In political terms, the economic problems found expression in the rise of radical movements who promised solutions which conventional political parties appeared unable to provide. In Britain this was seen with the rise of the Communist Party of Great Britain (CPGB) and the British Union of Fascists under Oswald Mosley. However, their political strength was limited and unlike in the rest of Europe, the conventional political parties did not face a significant challenge. In 1931 the Labour Government resigned having failed to agree cuts in national expenditure, disagreeing over the extent of cuts in welfare payments, to be replaced by a McDonald-led National Government. The Conservative Party, which provided the majority of its MPs, was returned to power in the 1935 general election.

=== Second World War ===
In the Second World War, 1939–45, Britain had a highly successful record of mobilising the home front for the war effort, in terms of mobilising the greatest proportion of potential workers, maximising output, assigning the right skills to the right task, and maintaining the morale and spirit of the people. Much of this success was due to the systematic planned mobilisation of women, as workers, soldiers, and housewives, enforced after December 1941 by conscription. The women supported the war effort, and made the rationing of consumer goods a success.

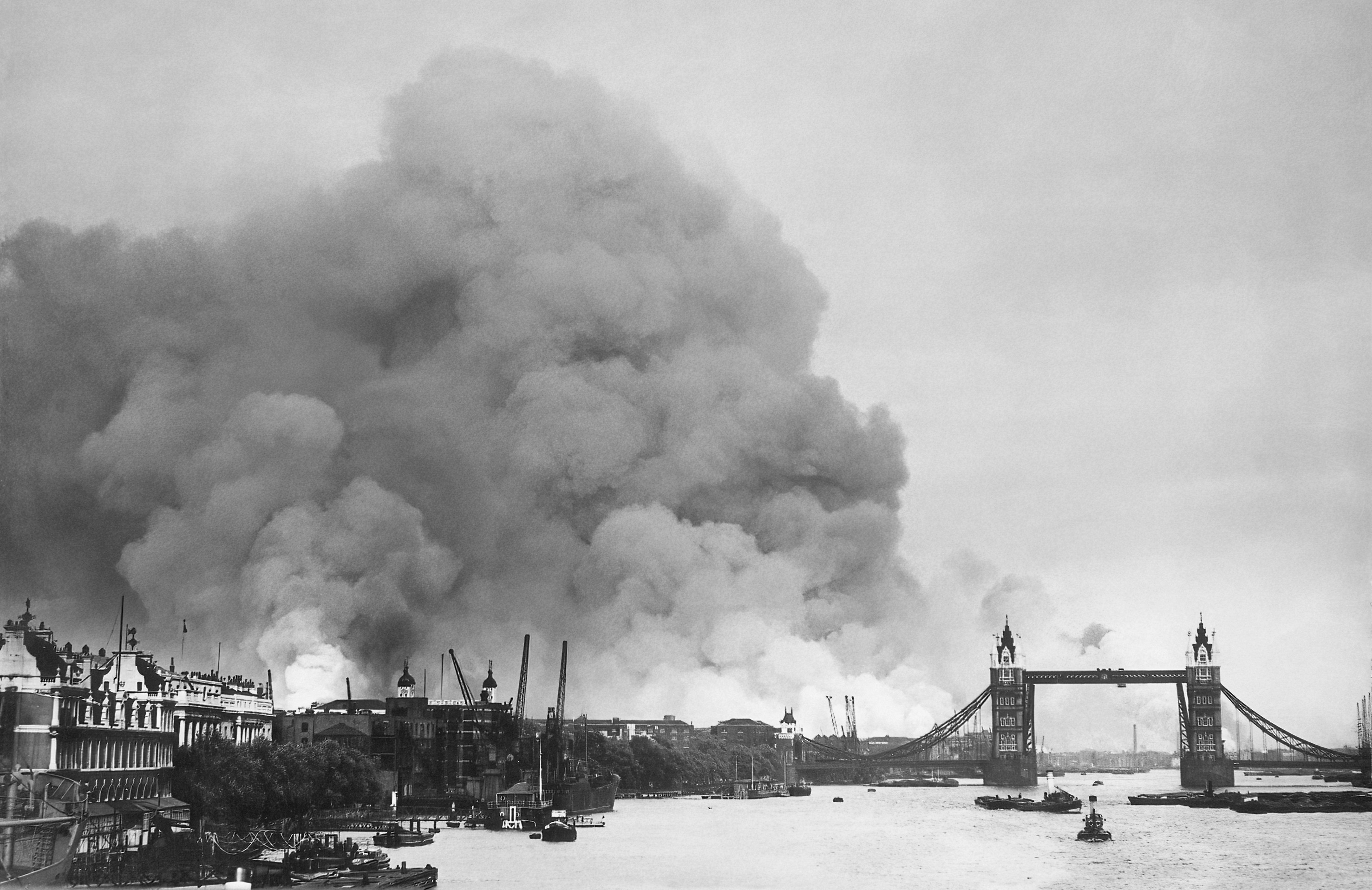
Smoke billowing from London's Surrey Docks, after a destructive night-time bombing raid by the Luftwaffe on 7 September 1940

Industrial production was reoriented toward munitions, and output soared. In steel, for example, the Materials Committee of the government tried to balance the needs of civilian departments and the war effort, but strategic considerations received precedence over any other need. Highest priority went to aircraft production as the RAF was under continuous heavy German pressure. The government decided to concentrate on only five types of aircraft in order to optimise output. They received extraordinary priority. Covering the supply of materials and equipment and even made it possible to divert from other types the necessary parts, equipment, materials and manufacturing resources. Labour was moved from other aircraft work to factories engaged on the specified types. Cost was not an object. The delivery of new fighters rose from 256 in April to 467 in September 1940—more than enough to cover the losses—and RAF Fighter Command emerged triumphantly from the Battle of Britain in October with more aircraft than it had possessed at the beginning. Starting in 1941 the U.S. provided munitions through Lend lease that totalled $15.5 billion.

After war broke out between Britain and Germany in September 1939, Britain imposed exchange controls. The British Government used its gold reserves and dollar reserves to pay for munitions, oil, raw materials and machinery, mostly from the U.S. By the third quarter of 1940 the volume of British exports was down 37% compared to 1935. Although the British Government had committed itself to nearly $10,000 million of orders from America, Britain's gold and dollar reserves were near exhaustion. The Roosevelt Administration was committed to large-scale economic support of Britain and in early 1941 enacted Lend-Lease, whereby America would give Britain supplies totalling $31.4 billion which never had to be repaid.

== 1945–2001 ==
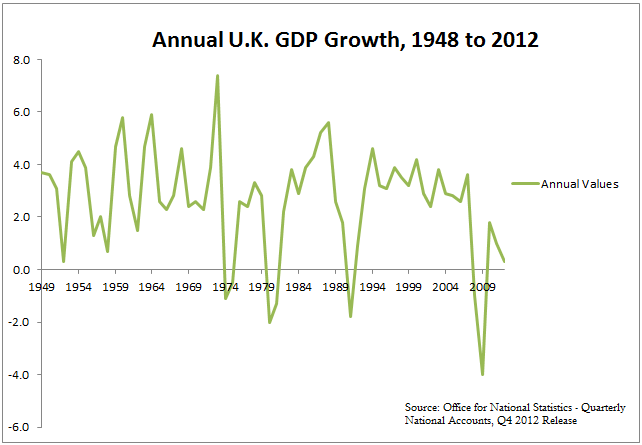
This graph depicts annual U.K. GDP growth from 1948 to 2012.

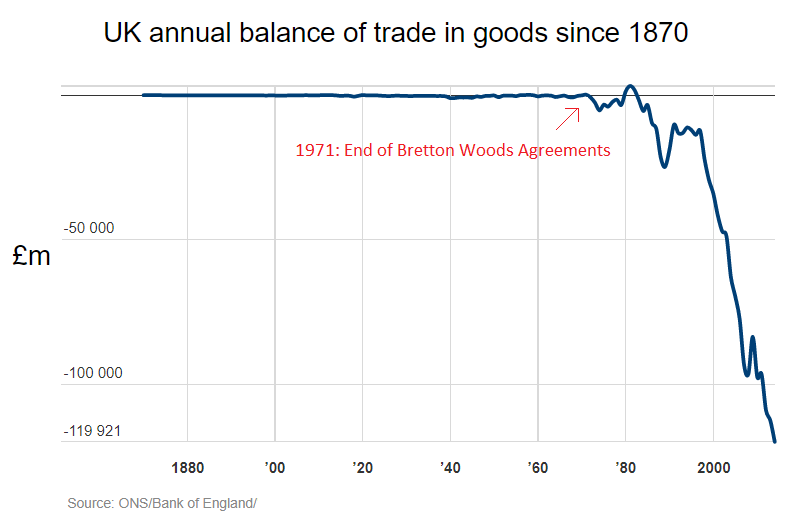
UK annual balance of trade in goods since 1870 (£m)

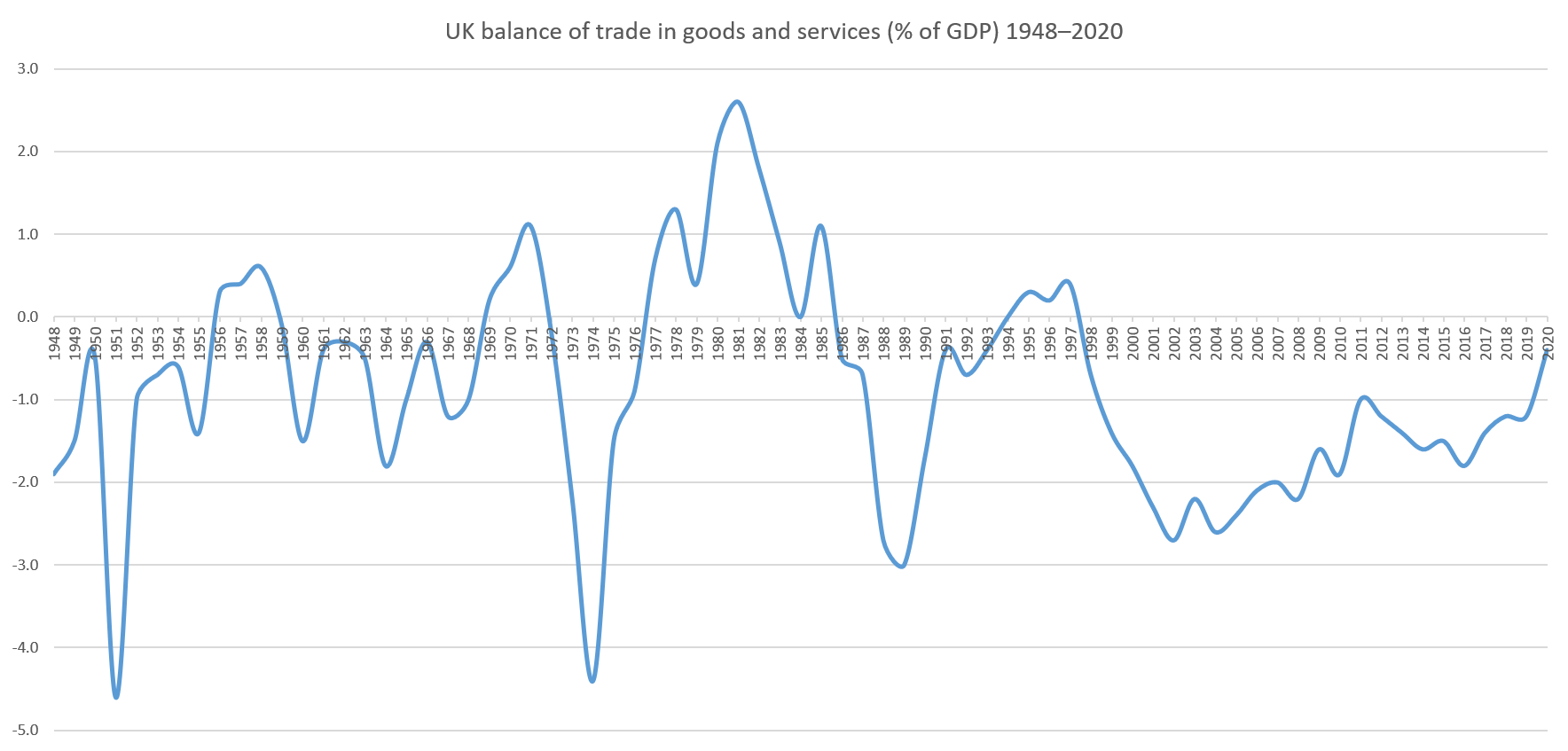
Trade in goods and services balance (U.K.)

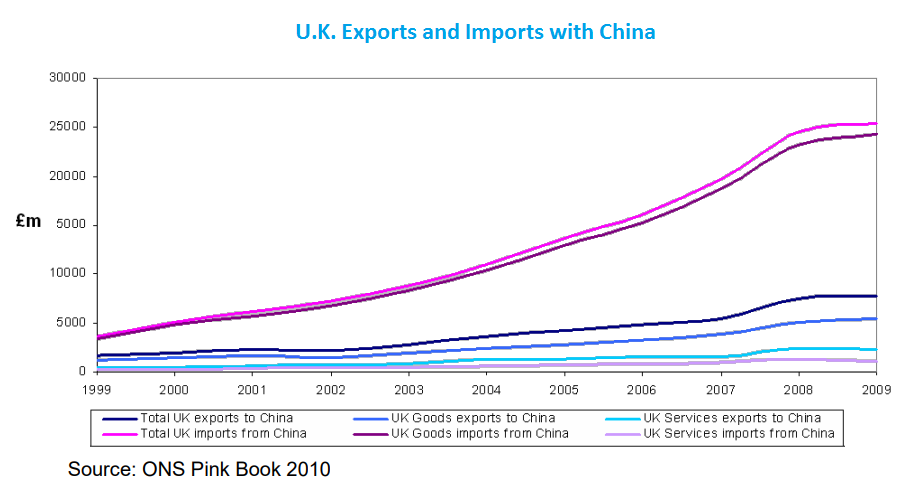
UK Trade with China (1999–2009)

Although Britain achieved ultimate victory in the war, the economic costs were enormous. The net losses in British national wealth amounted to 18.6% (£4.595 billion) of the prewar wealth (£24.68 billion), at 1938 prices. Six years of prolonged warfare and heavy losses of merchant shipping meant that Britain had lost two-thirds of her pre-war export trade by 1945. The loss of her export markets also caused a serious shortage of US dollars, which were crucial to servicing Britain's war debt and maintaining imports from the United States. Most of Britain's gold and currency reserves were depleted and the Government had been forced to sell off the bulk of British overseas assets to fund the war effort. When Lend Lease was terminated by the United States in August 1945, Britain was unable to pay for the import of essential supplies from America. Although the US agreed to cancel $20 million in Lend Lease debt, the UK was forced to obtain a $3.75 billion loan from the United States at 2% interest in December 1945. The US/UK trade imbalance was perilously high, forcing the extension of rationing to lessen the imbalance and preserve precious United States dollars for the servicing of loan repayments.

Successive governments squandered billions of Marshall Plan Aid to support British world power pretensions, and so jeopardised the economic future of Britain. The Labour government chose not to use the $2.7 billion (Germany received $1.7b) in aid for industrial modernisation like West Germany had. Germany rebuilt factories like the Volkswagen plant in Wolfsburg. Germany, France and Italy were fully re-engineered with all electric rail lines. In Britain, steam engines, mechanical semaphore signalling and old track would remain into the 1960s. In addition, the road and telecommunications network in Britain remained equally inadequate, ill-maintained and out-of-date. By 1950–1 the UK still spent 7.7% of GNP on defence while Germany and Japan spent nothing.

In the 1945 general election, just after the end of the war in Europe, the Labour Party led by Clement Attlee was elected with a landslide majority (its first ever outright majority), introducing sweeping reforms of the British economy. Taxes were increased, industries were nationalised, and the welfare state with the National Health Service, pensions, and social security was expanded. Most rations were lifted by 1950, with a few of them remaining until 1954.

The next 15 years saw some of the most rapid growth Britain had ever experienced, recovering from the devastation of the Second World War and then expanding rapidly past the previous size of the economy. The economy went from strength to strength particularly after the Conservatives returned to government in 1951, still led by wartime leader Sir Winston Churchill until he retired to make way for Anthony Eden just before his party's re-election in 1955. However, the Suez crisis of 1956 weakened the government's reputation and Britain's global standing, and prompted Eden to resign in early 1957 to be replaced by Harold Macmillan.

By 1959, tax cuts had helped boost living standards and allow for a strong economy and low unemployment, with October 1959 seeing the Tories win their third consecutive general election with a greatly increased majority, which sparked public and media doubt regarding Labour's chances of future election success. Labour leader Hugh Gaitskell then drew a new economic plan for the party, heavily based on the success of the centralised industries of France and West Germany, by the 1960s the latter's economy surpassing the UK for the first time since 1915 as Europe's largest economy. Harold Wilson and Anthony Wedgwood Benn further developed the idea, becoming the backbone of the party's manifesto for the 1964 election.

Britain's economy remained strong with low unemployment into the 1960s, but towards the end of the decade this growth began to slow and unemployment was rising again. Harold Wilson, the Labour leader who had ended 13 years of Conservative rule with a narrow victory in 1964 before increasing his majority in 1966, was surprisingly voted out of power in 1970. The new Conservative government was led by Edward Heath.

During the 1970s Britain suffered a long running period of relative economic malaise, dogged by rising unemployment, frequent strikes and severe inflation, with neither the Conservative government of 1970 – 1974 (led by Edward Heath) nor the Labour government which succeeded it (led by Harold Wilson and from 1976 James Callaghan) being able to halt the country's economic decline. Inflation exceeded 20% twice during the 1970s and was rarely below 10%.

Unemployment exceeded 1 million by 1972 and had risen even higher by the time the end of the decade was in sight, passing the 1.5 million mark in 1978. The winter of 1978/79 brought a series of public sector strikes known as the Winter of Discontent, leading to the collapse of Callaghan's Labour government in March 1979 (two years after it had lost the three-seat parliamentary majority won in October 1974).

This led to the election of Margaret Thatcher, who had succeeded Edward Heath as Conservative leader in 1975. She cut back on the government's role in the economy and weakened the power of the trade unions. The final two decades of the 20th century saw an increase in service-providers and a drop in manufacturing and heavy industry, combined with privatisation of some sections of the economy.

=== 1945–1951: Age of Austerity ===
After the end of World War II, the British economy had again lost huge amounts of absolute wealth. Its economy was driven entirely for the needs of war and took some time to be reorganised for peaceful production. Britain's economic position was relatively strong compared to its devastated European neighbors – in 1947 British exports were equivalent in value to the combined exports of Western Europe. Anticipating the end of the conflict, the United States had negotiated throughout the war to liberalise post-war trade and the international flow of capital in order to break into markets which had previously been closed to it, including the British Empire's Pound Sterling bloc. This was to be realised through the Atlantic Charter of 1941, through the establishment of the Bretton Woods system in 1944, and through the new economic power that the US was able to exert due to the weakened British economy.

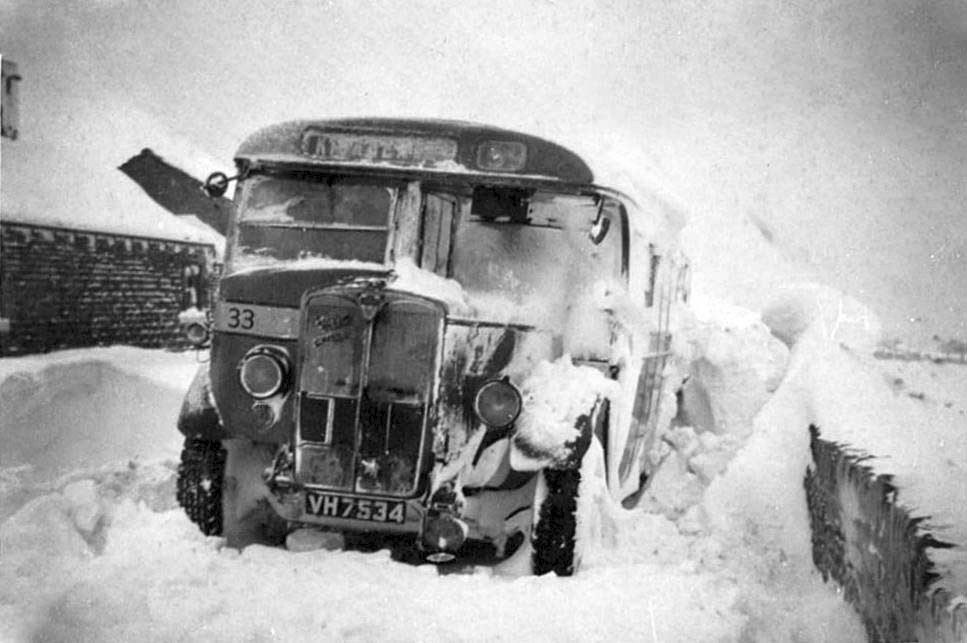
A snowbound bus in Huddersfield, during the record-cold winter of 1946–47, which caused major fuel shortages and damaged Britain's fragile post-war economic recovery

Immediately after the war in the Pacific ended, the U.S. halted Lend-Lease, but did give the UK a long-term low-interest loan of US$4.33bn. The loan was for US$3.75 billion (equivalent to $58.59 billion in 2023) at a low 2% interest rate; Canada loaned an additional US$1.9 billion (equivalent to $29.69 billion in 2023).

The winter of 1946–1947 proved to be very harsh, with curtailed production and shortages of coal, which again affected the economy so that by August 1947, when convertibility was due to begin, the economy was not as strong as it needed to be. When the Labour Government enacted convertibility, there was a run on Sterling, as pounds were traded for dollars. This damaged the British economy and within weeks convertibility was abandoned. By 1949, the British pound was seen to be overvalued; it was devalued on 18 September 1949 from £1 at $4.03 to $2.80. The US dollar had become the world's premier currency.

The major economic priority of post-war Britain was to raise exports to fund the UK's dollar deficit. This required the extension of rationing, as British goods and produce were prioritised for export markets. Unlike Continental European countries, where rationing was abandoned within a few years of the wars' end, Britain actually tightened rationing restrictions and didn't fully abandon them until 1954. The U.S. began Marshall Plan grants (mostly grants with a few loans) that pumped $3.3 billion into the economy and encouraged businessmen to modernize their approach to management. Marshall Aid, however, failed to have the desired effect of modernising industry and stimulating the economy, because 97% of the funds were used to service British debt repayments. This left the UK at a comparative disadvantage to rivals like France and West Germany, who were able to invest the money directly into industry and infrastructure, creating more competitive, efficient economies in the long-term.

=== Nationalisation ===
The Labour Governments of 1945–1951 enacted a political programme rooted in collectivism that included the nationalisation of industries and state direction of the economy. Both wars had demonstrated the possible benefits of greater state involvement. This underlined the future direction of the post-war economy, and was also supported in the main by the Conservatives. However, the initial hopes for nationalisation were not fulfilled and more nuanced understandings of economic management emerged, such as state direction, rather than state ownership. With the extensive nationalisation programme achieved, Keynesian management of the UK economy was adopted.

==== Depressed regions ====
With the postwar Labour Governments, the first comprehensive attempts at economic planning were made with initiatives intended to overhaul chronically depressed regions of the UK. The Distribution of Industry Act 1945 designated "development areas" in northeast England, Scotland, and Wales according to the findings of the Barlow Report of 1940, which had recommended a complete economic overhaul of the troubled areas it pinpointed. Between 1945 and 1950, the British government pumped some £300 million into the building of 481 new factories in these regions, to be leased to private industry. In addition there were 505 privately owned factories built in the troubled regions on the active encouragement of the government in London. This activity created an estimated 200,000 new jobs.

==== Coal ====
The policy of nationalising the coal mines had been accepted in principle by owners and miners alike before the elections of 1945. The owners were paid £165,000,000. The government set up the National Coal Board to manage the coal mines; and it loaned it £150,000,000 to modernise the system. The general condition of the coal industry had been unsatisfactory for many years, with poor productivity. In 1945, there were 28% more workers in the coal mines than in 1890, but the annual output was only 8% greater. Young people avoided the pits; between 1931 and 1945 the percentage of miners more than 40 years old rose from 35% to 43%, and 24,000 over 65 years old. The number of surface workers decreased between 1938 and 1945 by only 3,200, but in that same time the number of underground workers declined by 69,600, substantially altering the balance of labour in the mines. That accidents, breakdowns, and repairs in the mines were nearly twice as costly in terms of production in 1945 as they had been in 1939 was probably a by-product of the war. Output in 1946 averaged 3,300,000 tons weekly. By summer 1946 it was clear that the country was facing a coal shortage for the upcoming winter with stock piles of 5 million tons too low. Nationalisation exposed both a lack of preparation for public ownership and a failure to stabilise the industry in advance of the change. Also lacking were any significant incentives to maintain or increase coal production to meet demand.

=== Prosperity of the 1950s ===
The 1950s and 1960s were prosperous times and saw continued modernisation of the economy. Representative was the construction of the first motorways, for example. Britain maintained and increased its financial role in the world economy, and used the English language to promote its educational system to students from around the globe. Unemployment was relatively low during this period, and the standard of living continued to rise, with more new private and council housing developments and the number of slum properties diminishing. Churchill and the Conservatives were back in power following the 1951 elections, but they largely continued the welfare state policies as set out by the Labour Party in the late 1940s.

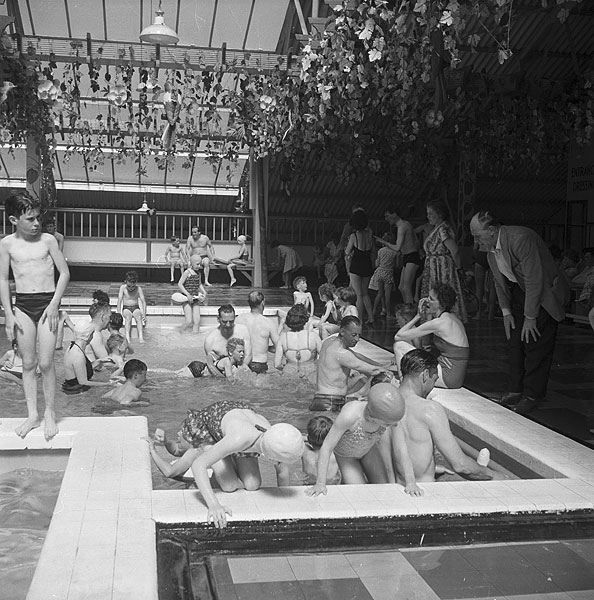
Butlins holiday camp in Pwllheli, Wales in the 1950s. Holiday camps symbolised the newfound prosperity and leisure of postwar Britain.

During the "golden age" of the 1950s and 1960s, unemployment in Britain averaged only 2%. As prosperity returned, Brits became more family centred. Leisure activities became more accessible to more people after the war. Holiday camps, which had first opened in the 1930s, became popular holiday destinations in the 1950s – and people increasingly had the money to pursue their personal hobbies. The BBC's early television service was given a major boost in 1952 with the coronation of Elizabeth II, attracting a worldwide audience of twenty million, plus tens of millions more by radio, proving an impetus for middle-class people to buy televisions. In 1950, just 1% owned television sets; by 1965 25% did. As austerity receded after 1950 and consumer demand kept growing, the Labour Party hurt itself by shunning consumerism as the antithesis of the socialism it demanded.

Small neighbourhood shops were increasingly replaced by chain stores and shopping centres, with their wide variety of goods, smart advertising, and frequent sales. Cars were becoming a significant part of British life, with city-centre congestion and ribbon developments springing up along many of the major roads. These problems led to the idea of the green belt to protect the countryside, which was at risk from development of new housing units.

The post-World War II period witnessed a dramatic rise in the average standard of living, with a 40% rise in average real wages from 1950 to 1965. Workers in traditionally poorly paid semi-skilled and unskilled occupations saw a particularly marked improvement in their wages and living standards. In terms of consumption, there was more equality, especially as the landed gentry was hard pressed to pay its taxes and had to reduce its level of consumption. As a result of wage rises, consumer spending also increased by about 20% during the same period, while economic growth remained at about 3%. In addition, the last food rations were ended in 1954 while hire-purchase controls were relaxed in the same year. As a result of these changes, large numbers of the working classes were able to participate in the consumer market for the first time.

Entitlement to various fringe benefits was improved. In 1955, 96% of manual labourers were entitled to two weeks' holiday with pay, compared with 61% in 1951. By the end of the 1950s, Britain had become one of the world's most affluent countries, and by the early Sixties, most Britons enjoyed a level of prosperity that had previously been known only to a small minority of the population. For the young and unattached there was, for the first time in decades, spare cash for leisure, clothes, and luxuries. In 1959, Queen magazine declared that "Britain has launched into an age of unparalleled lavish living." Average wages were high while jobs were plentiful, and people saw their personal prosperity climb even higher. Prime Minister Harold Macmillan claimed that "the luxuries of the rich have become the necessities of the poor". As summed up by R. J. Unstead,

Opportunities in life, if not equal, were distributed much more fairly than ever before and the weekly wage-earner, in particular, had gained standards of living that would have been almost unbelievable in the thirties.

As noted by historian Martin Pugh:

Keynesian economic management enabled British workers to enjoy a golden age of full employment which, combined with a more relaxed attitude towards working mothers, led to the spread of the two-income family. Inflation was around 4 per cent, money wages rose from an average of £8 a week in 1951 to £15 a week by 1961, home-ownership spread from 35 per cent in 1939 to 47 per cent by 1966, and the relaxation of credit controls boosted the demand for consumer goods.

The number one selection for the housewife was a washing machine. Ownership jumped from 18 per cent in 1955 to 29 per cent in 1958, and 60 per cent in 1966. By 1963, 82% of all private households had a television, 72% a vacuum cleaner, and 30% a refrigerator. John Burnett notes that ownership had spread down the social scale so that the gap between consumption by professional and manual workers had considerably narrowed. The provision of household amenities steadily improved in the late decades of the century. From 1971 to 1983, households having the sole use of a fixed bath or shower rose from 88% to 97%, and those with an internal WC from 87% to 97%. In addition, the number of households with central heating almost doubled during that same period, from 34% to 64%. By 1983, 94% of all households had a refrigerator, 81% a colour television, 80% a washing machine, 57% a deep freezer, and 28% a tumble-drier.

=== Relative decline ===
From a European perspective, however, Britain was not keeping pace. Between 1950 and 1970, it was overtaken by most of the countries of the European Common Market in terms of the number of telephones, refrigerators, television sets, cars, and washing machines per 100 of the population. Education provision expanded, but not as fast as in neighbouring European countries. By the early 1980s, some 80% to 90% of school leavers in France and West Germany received vocational training, compared with only 40% in the United Kingdom. By the mid-1980s, over 80% of pupils in the United States and West Germany and over 90% in Japan continued in education until the age of eighteen, compared with barely 33% of British pupils. In 1987, only 35% of 16- to 18-year-olds were in full-time education or training, compared with 80% in the United States, 77% in Japan, 69% in France, and 49% in Germany.

Economic growth in Britain, though steady through the 1950s, was not nearly as fast as on the continent. The statistics should be interpreted with care: Britain was far ahead of some other European nations in terms of economic development and urbanisation. Countries like Italy, France and Spain, overwhelmingly agrarian in character at the end of the Second World War, were experiencing a process of rapid industrialisation and urbanisation that Britain had already passed through in the 19th century. This explanation is known as the "early start theory" among economists, and explains why European nations showed markedly stronger levels of absolute growth in industry compared to the UK, a country which was already transitioning into a post-industrial, service-based economy. These countries had large surplus agricultural populations to draw into the cities to work in factories, while the UK as the most heavily urbanised nation in Europe had only a mere 5% of the population employed on the land by 1945 (dropping to 2.7% by 1977). As such, the traditional source of new labour for low-wage factory work, rural labourers, was virtually non-existent in Britain and this constrained growth potential. Immigration from the Commonwealth, and later from Europe, was one policy response to this officially perceived labour shortage.

There was also a systemic malaise in British industry, which was famously inefficient and opposed to innovations. Tony Judt described the prevailing attitude of post-war industrialists: "British factory managers preferred to operate in a cycle of under-investment, limited research and development, low wages and a shrinking pool of clients, rather than risk a fresh start with new products in new markets." The overriding emphasis placed on exports by the British government, in its effort to repair the nation's dollar deficit, made things worse, because it encouraged manufacturers to place all investment in expanding output, at the expense of updating machinery, introducing new technologies, improving production methods, etc. This policy was sustainable in the short-term, because in the late 1940s and early 50s world trade boomed and Britain, with its large and relatively undamaged industrial base, was in a uniquely advantageous position to satisfy demand. In 1950, 25% of world exports were British-made, and the total volume of British manufactured goods was double that of France and Germany combined. However, by the late 1950s, the economies of West Germany, France, Japan, and Italy, had recovered from wartime infrastructure damage, replacing destroyed stock with state-of-the-art machinery and applying modern production methods in a process called "rejuvenation by defeat". Continental governments actively encouraged recovery through direct investment/subsidies in targeted industries, in the case of Italy and France, or more widely through encouraging easy access to credit through national banks, a marked characteristic in France and West Germany. British industrialists saw no such intervention from their own government, which more or less left the private sector to itself. British goods were also more expensive abroad because of Sterling's overvaluation, but inferior in quality compared to the products flooding the world market from the United States, Germany and Italy.

Rapid decolonisation in the British Empire through the late 1950s and 1960s dealt a further blow to British industry. Britain had enjoyed a virtual monopoly of the consumer markets within the Empire, enforced by the closed Pound Sterling Bloc, but it could not compete once the territories gained independence and were free to negotiate their own trade agreements.

==== Suez Crisis ====
Although the 1950s were overall a time of prosperity for Britain, the Suez Crisis of November 1956 precipitated a financial crisis and a speculative run on Sterling which underlined the fragility of post-war British finances. The tripartite invasion of the Suez Canal Zone by Britain, France and Israel in late October 1956, following Egypt's nationalisation in July of the Suez Canal Company (hitherto, a French company, albeit one with a majority share holding owned by the British government), was a disaster for British prestige and the economy. The United States and the United Nations came out firmly against the occupation, which caused a run on sterling as foreign governments withdrew their holdings and converted them into either the US dollar or gold. In the run up to the invasion £214 million was withdrawn by nervous investors and foreign governments. Britain's decision to freeze Egypt's holdings in response to the nationalisation inspired panic in other foreign governments who feared their assets might be frozen if they supported the Egyptian cause. With the invasion a further £279 million was withdrawn, leaving a scarce £1.965 billion left in sterling reserves. The Bank of England sought to prevent devaluation by purchasing the pound on foreign exchange markets, using up its precious dollar reserves in the process. By November dollar reserves had fallen beneath the $2 billion floor which the UK had sought to maintain since the late 1940s. Since the Canal was closed to shipping, the UK was reliant on imports of American oil, and devaluing the pound would make oil more expensive and possibly trigger serious inflation.

Within days of the invasion, the UK had declared a cease-fire and Prime Minister Anthony Eden was appealing to the International Monetary Fund for a $560 million loan, which was only granted on the condition that the country vacate the Canal Zone. This was agreed to, and Britain received a combined $1.3 billion in loans through the IMF and the American Export-Import Bank. British withdrawal from the Canal Zone was completed by 22 December, and the pound returned to its pre-crisis parity with the dollar by January 1957, but not without very nearly losing its value as an international reserve currency.

=== 1960–1979: the Sixties and Seventies ===
==== Deindustrialisation ====
The United Kingdom has experienced considerable deindustrialisation, especially in both heavy industry (such as mining and steel) and light manufacturing. New jobs have appeared with either low wages, or with high skill requirements that the laid-off workers lack. Meanwhile, the political reverberations have been growing. Jim Tomlinson agrees that deindustrialisation is a major phenomenon but denies that it represents a decline or failure.

The UK's share of global manufacturing output had risen from 9.5% in 1830, to 22.9% in the 1870s. It fell to 13.6% by 1913, 10.7% by 1938, and 4.9% by 1973. Overseas competition, trade unionism, the welfare state, loss of the British Empire, and lack of innovation have all been put forward as explanations for the industrial decline. It reached a crisis point in the 1970s, with a worldwide energy crisis, high inflation, and a dramatic influx of low-cost manufactured goods from Asia. Coal mining quickly collapsed and practically disappeared by the 21st century. Railways were decrepit, more textile mills closed than opened, steel employment fell sharply, and the car-making industry suffered. The government decided in 1964 that underdeveloped or industrially obsolete areas with high unemployment would benefit from economic subsidy, and at least three aluminum smelters enjoyed subsidy "totaling some $144‐million and representing a 40 per cent investment grant for plant and machinery. The two largest smelters were fostered by the decision to authorise cheap bulk sales of electric power based on anticipated breakthroughs in nuclear power costs. High power costs in Britain previously militated against the electrolytic aluminum industry, which is an enormous power user... Another purpose of encouraging the development of domestic primary aluminum industry was to reduce imports. Previously, the only primary production in Britain was at British Aluminium's two small Scottish smelters, which had a total output of 39,000 tons" in 1970.

Popular responses varied a great deal; Tim Strangleman et al. found a range of responses from the affected workers: for example, some invoked a glorious industrial past to cope with their new-found personal economic insecurity, while others looked to the European Union for help. It has been argued that these reverberations contributed towards the popular vote in favour of Brexit in 2016.

Economists developed two alternative interpretations to explain de-industrialisation in Britain. The first was developed by Oxford economists Robert Bacon and Walter Eltis. They argue that the public sector expansion deprived the private sector of sufficient labour and capital. In a word, the government "crowded out" the private sector. A variation of this theory emphasises the increases in taxation cut the funds needed for wages and profits. Union demands for higher wage rates resulted in lower profitability in the private sector, and a fall in investment. However, many economists counter that public expenditures have lowered unemployment levels, not increased them.

The second explanation is the New Cambridge model associated with Wynne Godley and Francis Cripps. It stresses the long-term decline and competitiveness of British industry. During the 1970s especially, the manufacturing sector steadily lost its share of both home and international markets. The historic substantial surplus of exports over Imports slipped into an even balance. That balance is maintained by North Sea oil primarily, and to a lesser extent from some efficiency improvement in agriculture and service sectors. The New Cambridge model posits several different causes for the decline in competitiveness. Down to the 1970s, the model stresses bad delivery times, poor design of products, and general low-quality. The implication is that although research levels are high in Britain, industry has been laggard in implementing innovation. The model after 1979 points to the appreciation of sterling against other currencies, so that British products are more expensive. In terms of policy, the New Cambridge model recommends general import controls, or else unemployment will continue to mount. The model indicates that deindustrialisation is a serious problem which threatens the nation's ability to maintain balance of payments equilibrium in the long run. The situation after North Sea oil runs out appears troublesome. De-industrialisation imposes that serious social consequences. Workers skilled in the manufacturing sector are no longer needed, and are shuffled off to lower paying, less technologically valuable jobs. Computerisation and globalisation are compounding that problem. Nicholas Crafts attributes the relatively poor productivity growth of the British economy during the postwar period to a mixture of failure to invest in equipment and skills, poor management, insufficient competition, dysfunctional management-labour relations and poor economic policy.

Deindustrialisation meant the closure of many enterprises in mining, heavy industry and manufacturing, with the resulting loss of high paid working-class jobs. A certain amount of turnover had always taken place, with older businesses shutting down and new ones opening up. However, the post-1973 scene was different, with a worldwide energy crisis, and an influx of low-cost manufactured goods from Asia. Coal mining slowly collapsed, and finally disappeared in the 21st century. The railways were decrepit, more textile mills closed than opened, steel employment fell sharply, and the automobile industry practically disappeared, apart from some luxury production. There was a range of popular response. By the 21st century, grievances accumulated enough to have a political impact. The political reverberations came to a head in the unexpected popular vote in favour of Brexit in 2016.

==== Stagnation ====
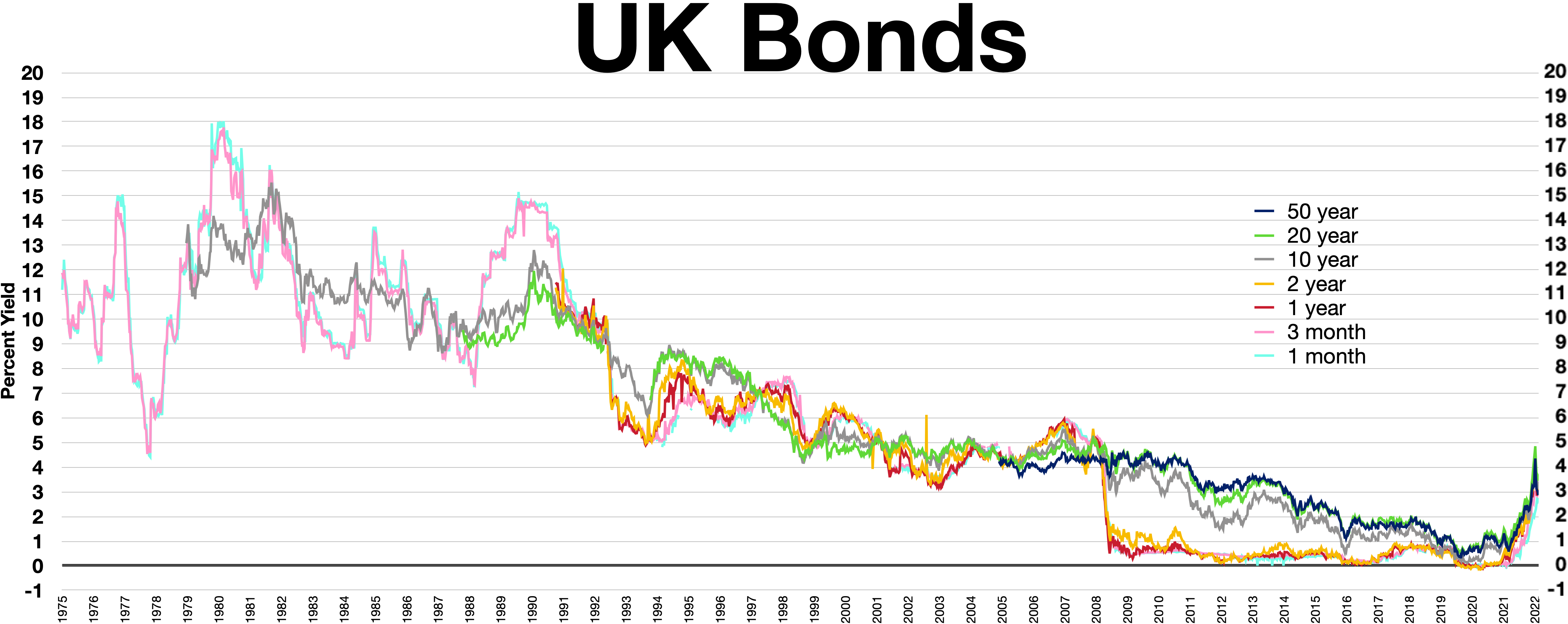
United Kingdom bonds 50 year 20 year 10 year 2 year 1 year 3 month 1 month

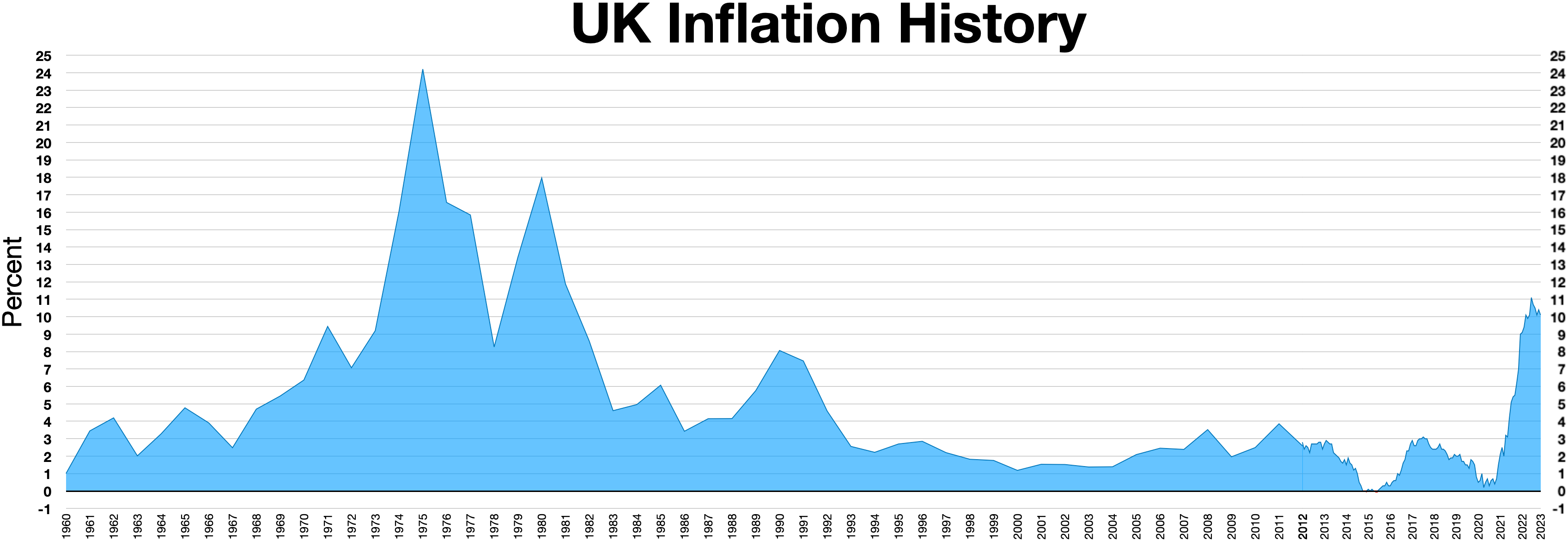
UK inflation history

While industry performance had remained strong in nearly 20 years following the end of the war, and extensive house building and construction of new commercial developments and public buildings also kept unemployment low throughout this time. As negative factors coalesced during the 1960s, the slogan used by Prime Minister Harold Macmillan "(most of) our people have never had it so good" seemed increasingly hollow. The Conservative Government presided over a 'stop-go' economy as it tried to prevent inflation spiralling out of control without snuffing out economic growth. Growth continued to be disappointing, at about only half the rate Germany or France achieved in the same period.

In comparing economic prosperity (using gross national product per person), there was a common perception of continued relative economic decline; Britain slipped from seventh place in the world ranks of income per capita in 1950, to 12th in 1965, and to 20th in 1975. Labour politician Richard Crossman, after visiting prosperous Canada, returned to England with a "sense of restriction, yes, even of decline, the old country always teetering on the edge of a crisis, trying to keep up appearances, with no confident vision of the future."

Economists provided four overlapping explanations. The "early start" theory said that Britain's rivals were doing so well relatively because they were still moving large numbers of farm workers into more lucrative employment, structural change achieved in the UK in the 19th century. A second theory emphasised the "rejuvenation by defeat", whereby Germans and Japanese managers and politicians had been forced to reequip, rethink and restructure their economies. The third approach emphasised the drag of "Imperial distractions", whereby Britain's responsibilities to its extensive, though rapidly declining empire handicapped the domestic economy, especially through defence spending, and economic aid. Finally, the theory of "institutional failure" stressed the negative roles of discontinuity, unpredictability, and class envy. The last theory blamed public schools, and universities perpetuating an elitist anti-industrial attitude while trade unions were regarded as traditionalist and conservative. An additional factor, perhaps a feature of the social traditionalism, was the alleged disappointing performance of British management.

==== Labour responds ====
The result was a major political crisis, and a Winter of Discontent in the winter of 1978–1979, during which there were widespread strikes by public sector unions that seriously inconvenienced and angered the public.

Historians Alan Sked and Chris Cook have summarised the general consensus of historians regarding Labour in power in the 1970s:

If Wilson's record as prime minister was soon felt to have been one of failure, that sense of failure was powerfully reinforced by Callaghan's term as premier. Labour, it seemed, was incapable of positive achievements. It was unable to control inflation, unable to control the unions, unable to solve the Irish problem, unable to solve the Rhodesian question, unable to secure its proposals for Welsh and Scottish devolution, unable to reach a popular modus vivendi with the Common Market, unable even to maintain itself in power until it could go to the country and the date of its own choosing. It was little wonder, therefore, that Mrs. Thatcher resoundingly defeated it in 1979.

The Labour Party under Harold Wilson from 1964 to 1970 was unable to provide a solution either, and eventually devalued the pound from US$2.80 to US$2.40 took effect on 18 November 1967. Economist Nicholas Crafts attributes Britain's relatively low growth in this period to a combination of a lack of competition in some sectors of the economy, especially in the nationalised industries; poor industrial relations; and insufficient vocational training. He writes that this was a period of government failure caused by poor understanding of economic theory, short-termism, and a failure to confront interest groups.

Both political parties had come to the conclusion that Britain needed to enter the European Economic Community (EEC) in order to revive its economy. This decision came after establishing a European Free Trade Association (EFTA) with other, non-EEC countries since this provided little economic stimulus to Britain's economy. Levels of trade with the Commonwealth halved in the period 1945–1965 to around 25% while trade with the EEC had doubled during the same period. Charles de Gaulle vetoed a British attempt at membership in 1963 and again in 1967.

The general election in June 1970 saw the Conservatives, now led by Edward Heath, achieve a surprise return to government after the opinion polls had suggested a third successive Labour victory. Unemployment was still low by this stage, standing at 3% nationally. It was Heath who took the country into the EEC, in 1973.

However, with the continuing relative decline of Britain's economy during the 1960s, management-labour relations deteriorated towards the end of the Wilson government and this worker discontent led to a dramatic breakdown of the industrial environment under the Conservative Government of Edward Heath (1970–1974). In the early 1970s, the British economy suffered even more as strike action by trade unions, especially successful action by the miners' union, plus the effects of the 1973 oil crisis, led to a three-day week in 1973–74. However, despite a brief period of calm negotiated by the recently re-elected Labour Government of 1974 known as the Social Contract, a breakdown with the unions occurred again in 1978, leading to the Winter of Discontent, and eventually leading to the end of the Labour Government, then being led by James Callaghan, who had succeeded Wilson in 1976.

Unemployment had also risen during this difficult period for the British economy; unemployment reached 1.5 million in 1978 – nearly triple the figure of a decade earlier, with the national rate exceeding 5% for the first time in the postwar era. It had not fallen below 1 million since 1975, and has remained above this level ever since, rarely dropping below 1.5 million.

Also in the 1970s, oil was found in the North Sea, off the coast of Scotland, although its contribution to the UK economy was minimised by the need to pay for rising national debt and for welfare payments to the growing number of unemployed people.

=== 1979–1990: the Thatcher era ===
The election of Margaret Thatcher in 1979 marked the end of the post-war consensus and a new approach to economic policy, including privatisation and deregulation, reform of industrial relations, and tax changes. Competition policy was emphasised instead of industrial policy; consequent deindustrialisation and structural unemployment was more or less accepted. Thatcher's battles with the unions culminated in the Miners' Strike of 1984.

The Government applied monetarist policies to reduce inflation, and reduced public spending. Deflationary measures were implemented against the backdrop of the recession of 1980/81. Inflation was at its worst at over 20% in 1980, but by 1982–83 it had subsided to less than 10% and continued to subside until stabilising at around 4% in the autumn of 1987. With the recession of 1980/81, unemployment passed 2 million in the autumn of 1980, 2.5 million the following spring. By January 1982, unemployment had reached 3 million for the first time since the early 1930s, though this time the figure accounted for a lesser percentage of the workforce than the early 1930s figures, now standing at around 12.5% rather than in excess of 20%. In areas hit particularly hard by the loss of industry, unemployment was much higher, coming close to 20% in Northern Ireland and exceeding 15% in many parts of Wales, Scotland and northern England. The peak of unemployment actually came some two years after the recession ended and growth had been re-established, when in April 1984 unemployment stood at just under 3.3 million.

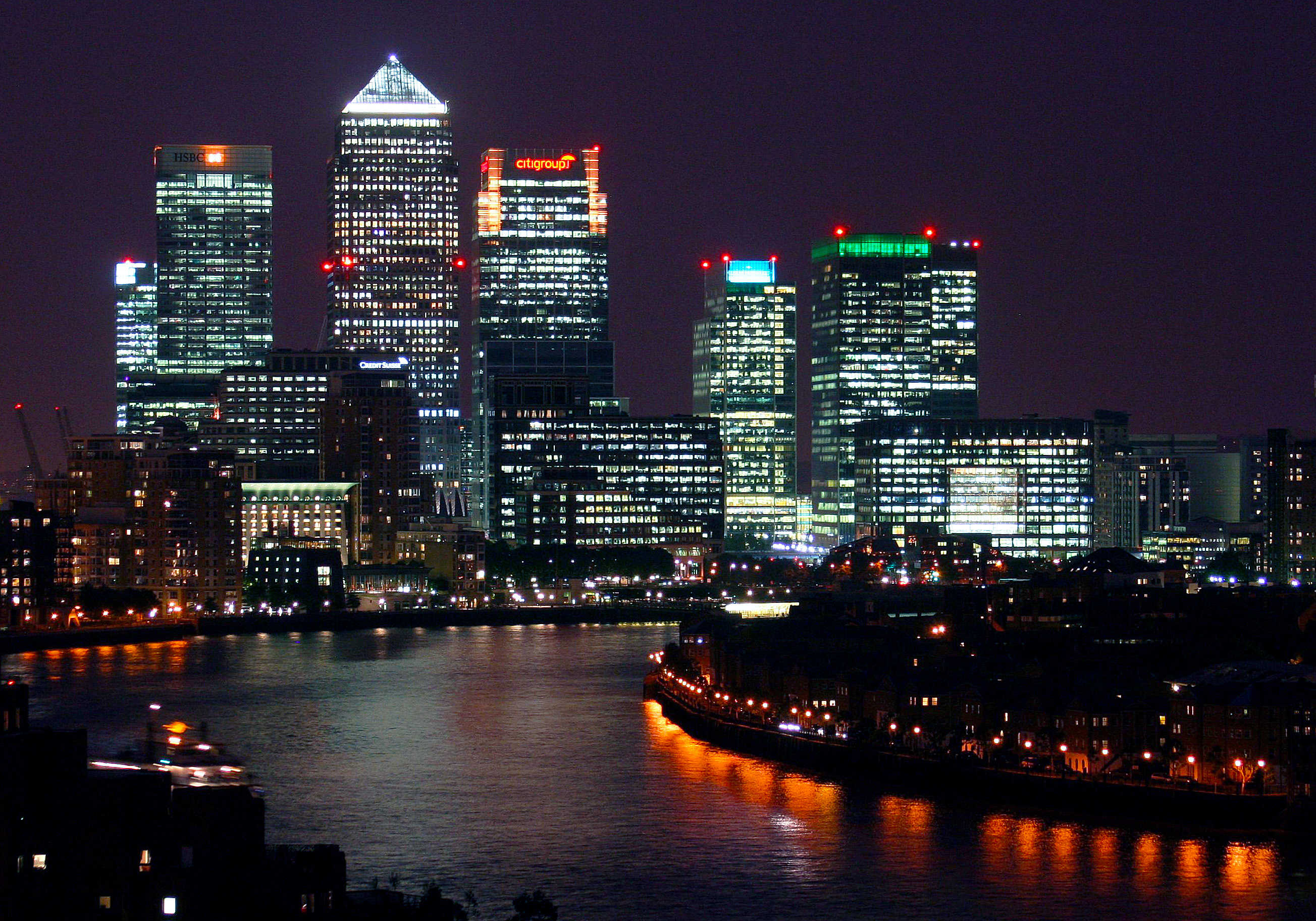
The development of a new financial centre at Canary Wharf was initiated by the Thatcher government to revitalise London's disused docklands area.

According to Eric Hobsbawm, Thatcher oversaw an "industrial holocaust", which saw Britain's industrial capacity decrease by fully one quarter during the years 1980–1984. Major state-controlled firms were privatised, including British Aerospace (1981), British Telecom (1984), British Leyland (1984), Rolls-Royce (1987), and British Steel Corporation (1988). The electricity, gas and English water industries were split up and sold off.

Exchange controls, in operation since the war, were abolished in 1979. This led to more volatile exchange rates, with the pound reaching a low of $1.054 on 25 February 1985 after which it recovered to almost $2 in February 1991. British net assets abroad rose approximately ninefold from £12 billion at the end of 1979 to nearly £110 billion at the end of 1986, a record post-war level and second only to Japan. Privatisation of nationalised industries increased share ownership in Britain: the proportion of the adult population owning shares went up from 7% in 1979 to 25% in 1989. The Single European Act (SEA), signed by Margaret Thatcher, allowed for the free movement of goods within the European Union area. The ostensible benefit of this was to give the spur of competition to the British economy, and increase its ultimate efficiency.

The Financial Services Act 1986 led to a deregulation later dubbed as Big Bang.

The early 1980s recession saw unemployment rise above three million, but the subsequent recovery, which saw annual growth of over 4% in the late 1980s, led to contemporary claims of a British 'economic miracle'. There is significant controversy as to whether Thatcherism was the reason for the boom in Britain in the 1980s; North Sea oil has been identified as a contributing factor in the increases in economic growth in the mid and late 1980s. However, many of the economic policies put in place by the Thatcher governments have been kept since, and even the Labour Party which had once been so opposed to the policies had by the late 1990s, on its return to government after nearly 20 years in opposition, dropped all opposition to them.

Indeed, the Labour Party of the 1980s had taken a shift to the left following the election of Michael Foot as leader in 1980, leading to a split in the party to form the centrist Social Democratic Party, which formed an alliance with the Liberals and contested two general elections, with disappointing results, before merging in 1988 to form the Liberal Democrats. The Conservatives were re-elected in 1983 and again in 1987, with a majority of more than 100 seats both times.

By the end of 1986, Britain was in the first stages of an economic boom, which saw unemployment fall below 3 million and reach a 10-year low of 1.6 million by December 1989. However, the rate of economic growth slowed down in 1989, with inflation approaching 10% and fears of an imminent recession being rife in the national media. Interest rates were increased by the government in an attempt to control inflation.

=== 1990–1997: the Major years ===
In November 1990, Margaret Thatcher stood down from the office of Prime Minister after losing first the confidence and then the support in Parliament of the Conservative Party's MPs, which she needed in order to continue. John Major was elected her successor. The government's popularity was also falling following the introduction of poll tax earlier that year, while unemployment was also starting to increase again as another recession loomed. Opinion polls were suggesting that the next general election could be won by Labour, led by Neil Kinnock since the resignation of Michael Foot in 1983.

Despite several major economies showing quarterly detraction during 1989, the British economy continued to grow well into 1990, with the first quarterly detraction taking place in the third quarter of the year, by which time unemployment was starting to creep upwards again after four years of falling. The beginning of another recession was confirmed in January 1991. Interest rates had been increased between 1988 and 1990 to control inflation, which topped 10% in 1990 but was below 3% by the end of 1992.

Economic growth was not re-established until early 1993, but the Conservative government which had been in power continuously since 1979 managed to achieve re-election in April 1992, fending off a strong challenge from Neil Kinnock and Labour, although with a significantly reduced majority.

The early 1990s recession was officially the longest in Britain since the Great Depression some 60 years earlier, though the fall in output was not as sharp as that of the downturn of the Great Depression or even that of the early 1980s recession. It had started during 1990 and the end of the recession was not officially declared until April 1993, by which time nearly 3 million people were unemployed.

The British pound was tied to EU exchange rates, using the Deutsche Mark as a basis, as part of the Exchange Rate Mechanism (ERM); however, this resulted in disaster for Britain. The restrictions imposed by the ERM put pressure on the pound, leading to a run on the currency. Black Wednesday in September 1992 ended British membership of the ERM. It also damaged the credibility of the Conservative's reputation for economic competence, and contributed to the end of the 18 years of consecutive Conservative government in 1997. The party had long been divided over European issues and many of these rifts within the party had still not been mended by 1997.

Despite the downfall of the Conservative government, it had seen a strong economic recovery in which unemployment had fallen by more than 1 million since the end of 1992 to 1.7 million by the time of their election defeat just over four years later. Inflation also remained low, with the ERM exit in 1992 being followed by a gradual decrease in interest rates during the years that followed.

=== 1997–2001: New Labour ===
From May 1997, Tony Blair's newly elected Labour government stuck with the Conservatives' spending plans. The Chancellor, Gordon Brown, gained a reputation by some as the "prudent Chancellor" and helped to inspire renewed confidence in Labour's ability to manage the economy following the economic failures of earlier Labour governments. One of the first acts that the new Labour government embarked on was to give the power to set interest rates to the Bank of England, effectively ending the use of interest rates as a political tool. Control of the banks was given to the Financial Services Agency.

Labour introduced the minimum wage, which has been raised every year since its introduction in April 1999. The Blair government also introduced a number of strategies to cut unemployment, including an expansion of the public sector. Unemployment was constantly below 1.5 million during the first half of the 2000s – a level not seen since the late 1970s, although the government never succeeded in getting unemployment back into the six figure tallies which were seen for most of the 30 years after the end of World War II.

The level of trade union membership fell sharply in the 1980s, and continued falling for most of the 1990s. The long decline of most of the industries in which manual trade unions were strong—e.g. steel, coal, printing, the docks—was one of the causes of this loss of trade union members.

In 2011, there were 6,135,000 members in TUC-affiliated unions, down from a peak of 12,174,000 in 1980. Trade union density was 14.1% in the private sector and 56.5% in the public sector.

== 21st century ==
In the Labour Party's second term in office, beginning in 2001, when it achieved another landslide victory, the party increased taxes and borrowing. The government wanted the money to increase spending on public services, notably the National Health Service, which they claimed was suffering from chronic under-funding. The economy shifted from manufacturing, which had been declining since the 1960s and grew on the back of the services and finance sectors, while the public sector continued to expand. The country was also at war with first Afghanistan, invading in 2001 and then Iraq, in 2003 – which proved controversial with the British public. Spending on both reached several billion pounds a year and the government's popularity began to slide, although it did manage to win a third general election under Blair in 2005 with a reduced majority. Blair stepped down two years later after a decade as prime minister to be succeeded by the former Chancellor Gordon Brown, the change of leader coming at a time when Labour was starting to lag behind the Conservatives (led by David Cameron) in the opinion polls.

By this stage, unemployment had increased slightly to 1.6 million although the economy continued to grow, the UK was continuing to lose large numbers of manufacturing jobs due to companies encountering financial problems or switching production overseas to save labour costs. This was particularly evident in the car industry, with General Motors (Vauxhall) and Ford having significantly cut back on UK operations, while Peugeot (the French carmaker who had bought the former Rootes Group and Chrysler Europe operations in the late 1970s) had completely withdrawn from Britain. These closures resulted in thousands of job losses, although the biggest single blow to the car industry came in 2005 when MG Rover went into liquidation; more than 6,000 jobs were lost at the carmaker alone and some 20,000 more were lost in associated supply industries and dealerships, not to mention the business failures and job cuts which befell businesses that had relied largely on trade from the carmaker's employees. This was the largest collapse of any European carmaker in modern times.

Growth rates were consistently between 1.6% and 3% from 2000 to early 2008. Inflation though relativity steady at around 2%, did rise with the 2007–2008 world food price crisis. The Bank of England's control of interest rates was a major factor in the stability of the British economy over that period. The pound continued to fluctuate, however, reaching a low against the dollar in 2001 (to a rate of $1.37 per £1), but rising again to a rate of approximately $2 per £1 in 2007. Against the Euro, the pound was steady at a rate of approximately €1.45 per £1. Since then, the effects of the Credit crunch have led to a slowdown of the economy. At the start of November 2008, for example, the pound was worth around €1.26; by the end of the year, it had almost approached parity, dropping at one point below €1.02 and ending the year at €1.04.

=== The 2008 recession and quantitative easing ===
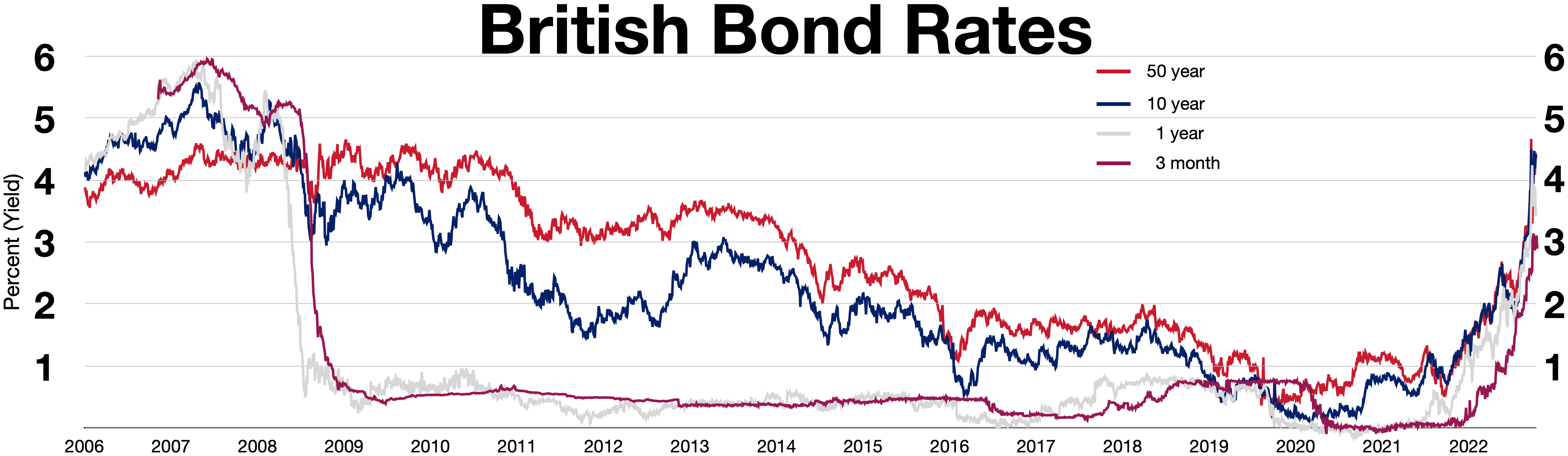
UK bond rates 50 year bond 10 year bond 1 year bond 3 month bond

The UK entered a recession in Q2 of 2008, according to the UK Office for National Statistics (ONS) and exited it in Q4 of 2009. The revised ONS figures of November 2009 showed that the UK had suffered six consecutive quarters of contraction. On 23 January 2009, Government figures from the Office for National Statistics showed that the UK was officially in recession for the first time since 1991. It entered a recession in the final quarter of 2008, accompanied by unemployment rising from 5.2% in May 2008 to 7.6% in May 2009. The unemployment rate among 18 to 24-year-olds rose from 11.9% to 17.3%. Although initially Britain lagged behind other major economies including Germany, France, Japan, and the US which all returned to growth in the second quarter of 2009, the country eventually returned to growth in the last quarter of 2009. On 26 January 2010, it was confirmed that the UK had left its recession, the last major economy in the world to do so. In the 3 months to February 2010 the UK economy grew yet again by 0.4%. In Q2 of 2010 the economy grew by 1.2% the fastest rate of growth in 9 years. In Q3 of 2010 figures released showed the UK economy grew by 0.8%; this was the fastest Q3 growth in 10 years.

On 5 March 2009, the Bank of England announced that they would pump £200 billion of new capital into the economy through a process known as quantitative easing. This is the first time in the United Kingdom's history that this measure has been used, although the Bank's Governor Mervyn King suggested it was not an experiment. The process saw the BoE creating new money for itself, which it used to purchase assets such as government bonds, bank loans, and mortgages. Despite the misconception that quantitative easing involves printing money, instead the money was created electronically and thus did not actually enter the cash circulation system. The initial amount created through this method was £75 billion, although former Chancellor of the Exchequer Alistair Darling had given permission for up to £150 billion to be created if necessary. It is thought the process is likely to occur over a period of three months with results only likely in the long term.

The BoE has stated that the decision has been taken to prevent the rate of inflation falling below the two per cent target rate. Mervyn King, the Governor of the BoE, also suggested there were no other monetary options left as interest rates had already been cut to their lowest level ever of 0.5% and it was unlikely they would be cut further.

As of the end of November 2009, the economy had shrunk by 4.9%, making the 2008–2009 recession the longest since records began. In December 2009, the Office for National Statistics revised figures for the third quarter of 2009 showed that the economy shrank by 0.2%, compared to a 0.6% fall the previous quarter.

It has been suggested that the UK initially lagged behind its European neighbours because the UK entered the 2008 recession later. However, German GDP fell 4.7% year on year compared to the UK's 5.1%, and Germany has now posted a second quarterly gain in GDP. Commentators suggested that the UK suffered a slightly longer recession than other large European countries as a result of government policy dating back to the policies of the Thatcher government of 1979, in which UK governments have moved away from supporting manufacturing and focused on the financial sector. The OECD predicts that the UK will grow 1.6% in 2010. The unemployment rate recorded by the Labour Force Survey fell in the fourth quarter of 2009, the first of the big three economies in the EU to do so. GDP decreased by a (second revision) figure of 0.2% in the third quarter of 2009, after a decrease of 0.6% in the second quarter, according to the Office for National Statistics (ONS). There was a 2.4% decline in the first quarter of 2009. By October 2009 the economy had contracted 5.9% from its peak before the recession began.

In October 2007, the International Monetary Fund (IMF) had forecast British GDP to grow by 3.1% in 2007 and 2.3% in 2008. However, GDP growth slowed to a fall of 0.1% in the April–June (second) quarter of 2008 (revised down from zero). In September 2008, the OECD forecast contraction for at least two quarters for the UK economy, possibly severe, placing its predicted performance last in the G7 of leading economies. Six quarters later the UK economy was still contracting, placing a question mark over OECD forecasting methods.

It has been argued that heavy government borrowing over the past cycle has led to a severe structural deficit, reminiscent of previous crises, which will inevitably exacerbate the situation and place the UK economy in an unfavourable position compared to its OECD partners as attempts are made to stimulate recovery, other OECD nations having allowed greater room for manoeuvre thanks to contrasting policies of relatively tighter fiscal control prior to the global downturn.

In May 2009 the European Commission (EC) stated: "The UK economy is now clearly experiencing one of its worst recessions in recent history." The EC expected GDP to decline 3.8% in 2009 and projected that growth will remain negative for the first three quarters of 2009. It predicted two quarters of "virtual stagnation" in late 2009 and early 2010, followed by a gradual return to "slight positive growth by late 2010".

The FTSE 100 and FTSE 250 rose to their highest levels in a year on 9 September 2009 with the FTSE 100 breaking through 5,000 and the FTSE 250 breaking through 9,000. On 8 September the National Institute of Economic and Social Research believed that the economy had grown by 0.2% in the three months to August, but was proved wrong. In its eyes the UK recession was officially over, although it did warn that "normal economic conditions" had not returned. On the same day, figures also showed UK manufacturing output rising at its fastest rate in 18 months in July. On 15 September 2009 the European Union incorrectly predicted the UK economy to grow by 0.2% between July and September, on the same day the governor of the Bank of England, Mervyn King said the UK GDP was now growing. At the same time unemployment fell in Wales.

Many commentators in the UK were certain that the UK would leave recession officially in Q3, believing that all the signs showed that growth was extremely likely, although in fact government spending had been insufficient to rescue the economy from recession at that point. Figures in fact showed no growth in retail sales in September 2009, and a 2.5% decline in industrial output in August. The revised UK figures confirmed that the economy shrank in Q3 of 2009 by 0.2%, although government spending on cash for the car scrappage scheme helped. The car scrappage scheme enabled owners of cars at least 10 years old to buy a new car at a reduced price in return for having their old car scrapped, and proved very popular with motorists.

Yet this temporary lapse was followed by a solid 0.4% growth in the Q4.

UK manufacturers' body, the EEF, appealed for more cash from the government: "Without an extension of support for business investment in the pre-Budget statement next month, it will be difficult to see where the momentum for growth will come from."

The downturn in the economy during 2008 and 2009 saw the popularity of the Labour government slump, and opinion polls all showed the Conservatives in the lead during this time, although by early 2010 the gap between the parties was narrow enough to suggest that the imminent general election would result in a hung parliament – as happened in May 2010. The Conservatives had the largest number of seats in the election, 20 short of a majority, and formed a government in coalition with the Liberal Democrats. The new government was faced with having to make deep public spending cuts over the following years in order to tackle the high level of national debt which had mounted up during Labour's response to the recession, which meant that unemployment remained high and the economy struggled to re-establish growth, although a marked improvement finally occurred in 2013 when economic growth and falling unemployment were sustained.

Moody's maintained the UK's AAA credit rating in September 2010, forecasting stable finances largely driven by governmental action. It also reported that while the economy is flexible to grow in the future household debt repayments, a poor export market and the economy's large exposure to the finance sector were factors likely to sap growth.

Subsequent to that, the economy contracted in 5 of the next 7 quarters, thus ensuring zero net growth from the end of the recession at the end of 2009, through to the middle of 2012. In 2010, the economy picked up and growing steadily however, in the summer, the Euro area crisis centred on Greece led to a second slow down in all European countries. The euro-zone entered a double dip recession that lasted from Q1 2011 until Q2 2013, and while the UK had no double dip recession it did however experience stagnant growth. While the first half of 2012 saw inflationary pressures subside and business confidence increase, a number of fundamental weaknesses remain, most notably a decline in the productivity of British business.

From Q2 2013, the UK's economy continued to grow for five consecutive quarters, the longest since Q1 of 2008, showing growth beating most developed economies helped by the rebound in the housing market and strong growth in both manufacturing and services industries. The IMF increased UK growth forecasts for 2014 from 1.9% to 2.4% in January 2014. Subsequently, inflation dropped to a low of 1.6% in Q1 2014, unemployment dropped to 6.8% (the lowest level since 2009) with impressive growth in employment leading to an all-time high of 30.4 million. The UK government posted a £107.6 billion national deficit for the fiscal year ending March 2014, meeting the target of £107.7 billion set a month previously. This was especially impressive since many countries in the EU, more specifically in the Euro, were stagnating such as France and Italy. However, it has been argued that the economic recovery was not reaching the majority of the people in the country, with wage growth not keeping up with inflation. In 2014 this metric improved with wage growth outpacing inflation for the first time after six years.

=== 2016 United Kingdom European Union membership referendum ===
When the Conservative Party won a majority of seats in the House of Commons at the 2015 general election, its leader Prime Minister David Cameron reiterated his party's manifesto commitment to hold an in-out referendum on UK membership of the EU by the end of 2017, but only after "negotiating a new settlement for Britain in the EU". On 23 June 2016, a referendum, commonly referred to as the EU referendum or the Brexit referendum, took place in the United Kingdom (UK) and Gibraltar to ask the electorate whether the country should remain a member of, or leave, the European Union (EU). It was organised and facilitated through the European Union Referendum Act 2015 and the Political Parties, Elections and Referendums Act 2000. The referendum resulted in 51.9% of the votes cast being in favour of leaving the EU. The referendum was legally non-binding due to the ancient principle of parliamentary sovereignty and also the enabling legislation only specified that a referendum should be held; however, the government of the time promised to implement the result.

=== Brexit and since ===
The withdrawal officially took place at 23:00 GMT on 31 January 2020 (00:00 1 February 2020 CET). (Note: The UK also left the European Atomic Energy Community (EAEC or Euratom).) The UK is the only sovereign country to have left the EU. The UK had been a member state of the EU or its predecessor, the European Communities (EC), since 1 January 1973. This began a transition period that ended on 31 December 2020 CET (11 p.m. GMT), during which the UK and EU negotiated their future relationship. During the transition, the UK remained subject to EU law and remained part of the European Union Customs Union and the European single market. However, it was no longer part of the EU's political bodies or institutions.

The EU–UK Trade and Cooperation Agreement (TCA) is a free trade agreement signed on 30 December 2020, between the European Union (EU), the European Atomic Energy Community (Euratom), and the United Kingdom (UK). It provisionally applied from 1 January 2021, when the Brexit transition period ended, before formally entering into force on 1 May 2021, after the ratification processes on both sides were completed: the UK Parliament ratified on 30 December 2020; the European Parliament and the Council of the European Union ratified in late April 2021.

On the UK's withdrawal from the European Union, the border in Ireland became the only land border between the UK and EU. EU single market and UK internal market provisions require certain customs checks and trade controls at their external borders. The Northern Ireland Protocol is intended to protect the EU single market, while avoiding imposition of a 'hard border' that might incite a recurrence of conflict and destabilise the relative peace that has held since the end of "the Troubles". Under the Protocol as originally agreed, Northern Ireland is formally outside the EU single market, but EU free movement of goods rules and EU Customs Union rules still apply; this ensures there are no customs checks or controls between Northern Ireland and the rest of the island. Goods from Northern Ireland may be moved without restriction to Great Britain but not conversely. Thus, in place of a Republic of Ireland/Northern Ireland land border, the protocol has created a de facto customs border in the Irish Sea, separating Northern Ireland from Great Britain, to the disquiet of prominent Unionists.

=== 2020s ===
The 2020s have been marked by significant economic challenges and transformations in the United Kingdom. In the early part of the decade, the country faced the combined impact of Brexit and the COVID‑19 pandemic, which disrupted trade, supply chains, and labour markets. The UK economy entered a brief recession in 2020 but recovered unevenly, with periods of high inflation and sluggish growth. Energy price shocks and global supply chain issues during 2021–2023 contributed to a cost‑of‑living crisis, prompting government interventions including energy subsidies and monetary tightening by the Bank of England.

By the mid‑2020s, the UK economy began to stabilise, although geopolitical tensions and global trade disputes created new uncertainties. In July 2025, UK financial markets rallied despite global economic instability triggered by U.S. tariff threats against Russia. The FTSE 100 and FTSE 250 indices recorded gains, outperforming other European markets during this period.

== Historiography of business in the United Kingdom ==
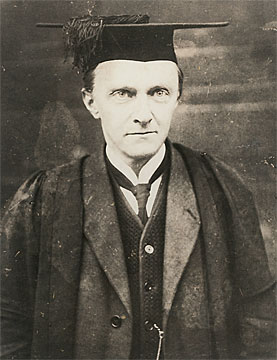
George Unwin

Business history in Britain emerged in the 1950s following the publication of a series of influential company histories and the establishment of the journal Business History in 1958 at the University of Liverpool. The most influential of these early company histories was Charles Wilson's History of Unilever, the first volume of which was published in 1954. Other examples include D. C. Coleman's work on Courtaulds and artificial fibres, B. W. E. Alford on Wills and the tobacco industry, and T. C. (Theo) Barker on Pilkington's and glass manufacture. These early studies were conducted primarily by economic historians interested in the role of leading firms in the development of the wider industry, and therefore went beyond mere corporate histories. Although some work examined the successful industries of the industrial revolution and the role of the key entrepreneurs, in the 1960s scholarly debate in British business history became increasingly focused on economic decline. For economic historians, the loss of British competitive advantage after 1870 could at least in part be explained by entrepreneurial failure, prompting further business history research into individual industry and corporate cases. However, by 1970 this interpretation of 'entrepreneurial failure' had been challenged by cliometricians, notably by Deirdre McCloskey, who quantitatively assessed the productivity path of the British economy in a more favourable light. More traditional analysis presented by Peter Payne in British Entrepreneurship in the Nineteenth Century presented a similar, though more deliberately nuanced, refutation of the thesis of "entrepreneurial failure"

One debate concerns the performance of firms in the Lancashire cotton textile industry. Often seen as the "leading sector" that propelled "economic take-off" of industrialisation, by 1890 its firms appeared relatively slow to invest in and adopt recent technological developments and demonstrated low levels of relative labour productivity by 1900. William Lazonick for example argued that cotton textile entrepreneurs in Lancashire, like their American cotton-textile producing counterparts, failed to develop the larger integrated plants found in other sectors of the American economy; a general conclusion proposed by Chandler in a number of comparative case studies. Paradoxically, J. & P. Coats, a Scottish cotton manufacturing firm headquartered in Paisley, Renfrewshire, not only achieved the industry's highest levels of productivity, in the world, let alone the United Kingdom, but the company also owned, amongst its impressive portfolio of subsidiaries, what was probably the best performing cotton manufacturing firm in the United States of America. While Lancashire may have failed, J. & P. Coats, the world's largest manufacturing company by equity market value in 1900, did not.

With the economic performance of British businessmen before 1914 now viewed in a better informed and more balanced way, the critics turned to sociology to emphasise their position in the class structure, especially their supposed subordinate relationship to the aristocracy, and their desire to use their wealth to purchase landed estates, and acquire hereditary titles.

British business history began to widen its scope in the 1980s, with innovative research conducted at the London School of Economics's Business History Unit, led first by Leslie Hannah, then by Terry Gourvish; here David Jeremy edited the multi-volume. A similar collection of biographies was published by scholars associated with the Centre for Business History in Glasgow, the Dictionary of Scottish Business Biography. Other research centres followed, including Reading, reflecting an increasing involvement in the discipline by Business and Management School academics.

The journal Business History reflected the widening ambition of the discipline as editors, first, Geoffrey Jones (Harvard Business School), Charles Harvey (University of Newcastle Business School), and more latterly, John Wilson (University of Newcastle Business School) and Steven Toms (Leeds University Business School) promoted management strategy themes such as networks, family capitalism, corporate governance, human resource management, marketing and brands, and multi-national organisations in their international as well as merely British context. These new themes have allowed business historians to challenge and adapt the earlier conclusions of Alfred D. Chandler Jr. and others about British businessmen and the performance of the British economy.

== See also ==
- Economy of the United Kingdom
- Historiography of the British Empire
- Historiography of the Poor Laws
- Historiography of the United Kingdom
- History of the United Kingdom
  - History of England
  - History of Northern Ireland
  - History of Scotland
  - History of Wales
- Economy of England in the Middle Ages
- Economic history of Scotland
- History of trade unions in the United Kingdom
- Taxation in the United Kingdom
- Social history of the United Kingdom (1945–present), includes some economic topics
- List of recessions in the United Kingdom
- Agricultural History Review
- Business History Review
- The Economic History Review
