= Peter Mathias =

British historian

- Born: Peter Mathias; 10 January 1928
- Died: 1 March 2016 (aged 88)
- Occupation: Historian
- Known for: Master of Downing College, Cambridge, Chichele Professor of Economic History at the University of Oxford and fellow of All Souls College, Oxford
- Awards: Commander of the British Empire (CBE), Fellow, The British Academy

Academic background
- Education: Jesus College, Cambridge
- Doctoral advisor: Charles Henry Wilson

Academic work
- Doctoral students: David Cannadine, Brian Harrison, Heita Kawakatsu, Emperor Naruhito, Edmund Newell, Patrick K. O'Brien, John Cunningham Wood
- Main interests: Economic history, business history, history of technology, British history
- Notable works: The First Industrial Nation: an Economic History of Britain 1700–1914 (1969)

Peter Mathias, CBE FRHistS FBA MAE (10 January 1928 – 1 March 2016) was a British economic historian and the former Chichele Professor of Economic History at the University of Oxford. His research focused on the history of industry, business, and technology, both in Britain and Europe. He is most well known for his publication of The First Industrial Nation: an Economic History of Britain 1700–1914 (1969), which discussed not only the multiple factors that made industrialisation possible, but also how it was sustained.

== Early life and education ==
Mathias was born in Freshford, Somerset to Jack Mathias (from Plymouth) and Marion (née) Love (from Wingfield).

He attended Colston's School and Bristol Grammar School where he became interested in history. In December 1945, he applied for a scholarship at King's College, Cambridge; instead he won an Exhibition at Jesus College, Cambridge, during summer 1946. However the college demanded that those coming up from school should have done military service before they arrived so he spent two years in the army as a conscript. At Cambridge, his tutor was the medievalist, Vivian Fisher, and the English economic historian, Charles Wilson. Mathias also spent the 1952–3 academic year at Harvard University, participating in the Research Center for Entrepreneurial History.

== Academic career ==
He was elected a Research Fellow at Jesus College, Cambridge, when he published his first book on the brewing industry in England. The manuscript described the importance of the technical aspects of brewing and manufacturing to the developing of the industry as a whole. Mathias then went out to complete a textbook on the history of industrialisation in Britain, The First Industrial Nation (1969).

He was fellow of Queens' College, Cambridge, from 1955 to 1968, and later an Honorary Fellow from 1987. He was Chichele Professor of Economic History at the University of Oxford and fellow of All Souls College, Oxford. There, he was editor of the Cambridge Economic History of Europe and co-founded of The Journal of European Economic History. He left Oxford to become master of Downing College, Cambridge, from 1987 to 1995.

Outside of research and teaching, Mathias contributed to the academic community with his positions at the Economic History Society (EHS) and the International Economic History Association (IEHA). He joined the former in his final year of undergraduate work at Cambridge. He continued to work for the EHS as Reviews Editor, Assistant Editor (1955–), Treasurer (1968–88), and President (1989–92). Meanwhile, the IEHA emerged from conferences at the Stockholm University, but expanded in the 1960s. Mathias also became a member of the Datini Institute in Prato, Italy in 1967, under the direction of Fernand Braudel and Federigo Melis.

== Later life ==
After retiring in 1995, he continued on advising and researching. He was the international advisor to Keio University, Japan, and President of the Great Britain Sasakawa Foundation. For this work, he was granted the Order of the Rising Sun with Gold Rays in 2003.

In 1998, Mathias' Festschrift, From Family Firms to Corporate Capitalism: Essays in Business and Industrial History in Honour of Peter Mathias was published by his former students, Kristine Bruland and Patrick O'Brien. Another Festschrift was published in 2018 entitled Asia and the history of the international economy : essays in memory of Peter Mathias, edited by A. J. H. Latham and Heita Kawakatsu. Professor Mathias is also mentioned extensively in The Thames and I, a memoir by the Prince (now Emperor) of Japan Naruhito, since he was the prince's supervisor while Naruhito was at Merton College in Oxford (1983-1985).

== Honours ==
=== Commonwealth honours ===
Commonwealth honours

Country	Date	Appointment	Post-nominal letters
United Kingdom	1984 – 1 March 2016	Commander of the Order of the British Empire	CBE

=== Foreign honours ===
Foreign honours

Country	Date	Decoration	Post-nominal letters
Japan	3 November 2003 – 1 March 2016	Order of the Rising Sun (Gold Rays with Neck Ribbon)	

=== Scholastic ===
Chancellor, visitor, governor, rector and fellowships

Location	Date	School	Position
England	1955 – 1968	Queens' College, Cambridge	Fellow
England	1987–1 March 2016	Queens' College, Cambridge	Honorary Fellow
England	1987 – 1 March 2016	Jesus College, Cambridge	Honorary Fellow
England	1995 – 1 March 2016	Downing College, Cambridge	Honorary Fellow

Honorary degrees

Location	Date	School	Degree	Gave Commencement Address
England	1984	University of Oxford	Doctor of Letters (D.Litt.)	
England	1985	University of Buckingham	Doctor of Letters (D.Litt.)	
England	1987	University of Cambridge	Doctor of Letters (D.Litt.)	
England	1988	University of Birmingham	Doctorate	
England	1992	University of Hull	Doctorate	
England	1995	De Montfort University	Doctorate	
England	1995	University of Warwick	Doctor of Letters (D.Litt.)	
England	1999	University of East Anglia	Doctorate	
Russian Federation	2003	Russian Academy of Sciences	Doctorate	
Japan	2006	Kansai University	Doctorate	
Japan	7 November 2008	Keio University	Doctor of Economics	

=== Memberships and Fellowships ===
Location	Date	Organisation	Position
England	1968 – 1972	Business Archives Council	Chairman
United Kingdom	1972 – 1 March 2016	Royal Historical Society	Fellow (FRHistS)
Netherlands	1974 – 1978	International Economic History Association	President
Netherlands		International Economic History Association	Honorary President
United Kingdom	1977 – 1 March 2016	British Academy	Fellow (FBA)
United Kingdom	1979 – 1989	British Academy	Honorary Treasurer
Denmark	1982 – 1 March 2016	Royal Danish Academy	Foreign Member
England	1984 – 1995	Business Archives Council	President
Italy	1987 – 1999	International Economic History Institute 'Datini' Prato, Italy	Vice President
Belgium	1988 – 1 March 2016	Royal Belgian Academy	Foreign Member
England	1989 – 1 March 2016	Academia Europaea	Member (MAE)
United Kingdom		Economic History Society	Vice President
United Kingdom	1989 – 1992	Economic History Society	President

== Works ==
- The Brewing Industry in England 1700-1830. CUP Archive. 1959.
- The Retailing Revolution: a History of Multiple Retailing in the Food Trades Based upon the Allied Suppliers Group of Companies (1967)
- The First Industrial Nation: an Economic History of Britain 1700–1914 (1969)
- (edited with A.W.H. Pearsall), Shipping: a survey of historical records (1971)
- Science and Society 1600–1900 (1972)
- The Transformation of England (1979)
- (edited with D. C. Coleman) Enterprise and history: essays in honour of Charles Wilson (1984)
- (edited with John A. Davis) The First Industrial Revolutions (1990)
- (edited with John A. Davis) Innovation and technology in Europe : from the eighteenth century to the present day (1991)
- (edited with John A. Davis) Enterprise and labour: from the eighteenth century to the present (1996)
- (edited with John A. Davis) International trade and British economic growth : from the eighteenth century to the present day (1996)

== Notes ==
Academic offices
Preceded by John Butterfield	Master of Downing College, Cambridge; 1987–1995	Succeeded by David King
