= Habakkuk (disambiguation) =

Habakkuk was a biblical prophet, from which the name originates. The Book of Habakkuk is the book of the Hebrew Bible he is credited with writing.

Habakkuk may also refer to:

- Habakkuk Commentary, a Dead Sea scroll
- Habakkuk and the Angel, a sculpture by Gian Lorenzo Bernini
- Project Habakkuk, an abortive project to build a huge floating airfield from ice during World War II
- Habakkuk (fanzine), a Hugo-nominated science fiction fanzine
- Habakkuk thesis, in economics

== Music ==
- "'Twas on the Good Ship Habakkuk", a 1960s folk song by the fictional character Rambling Syd Rumpo

== People ==
- Habakkuk Crabb (1750–1794), a dissenting English minister
- Avakum the Deacon (1794–1814), Serbian Orthodox hierodeacon, martyr and saint
- Enbaqom (the Ethiopian form of Habakkuk), Ethiopian abbot
- Paul Guldin, originally "Habakkuk Guldin" (1577–1643), a Swiss mathematician and astronomer
- John Habakkuk (1915–2002), an English economic historian
- Abacuk Pricket, English mutineer (Abacuk is the spelling used in the Wycliffe Bible)
