= Fritz Redlich =

Fritz Redlich might refer to:

- Frederick Carl Redlich (1910–2004), psychiatrist
- Fritz Leonhard Redlich (1892–1978), business historian
