= Time's Monster: How History Makes History =

History book about the British Empire

Time's Monster: How History Makes History is a 2020 non-fiction book by American Stanford University historian Priya Satia. It was published by the Belknap Press of Harvard University Press in the United States and by Allen Lane, an imprint of Penguin Books, in the United Kingdom under the title Time's Monster: History, Conscience and Britain's Empire. The book looks at how the academic field of history helped justify British imperialism by promoting a linear view of historical change. It also discusses how anticolonial thinkers offered different perspectives that eventually changed the discipline.

== Background ==
Satia has explained that the book started from a sudden realization about the main character of her previous book, Empire of Guns (2018). This character is Samuel Galton, an eighteenth-century English Quaker gunmaker. In 1796, he justified his weapons business to fellow Quakers by arguing that the British wartime economy left him with no other option. This insight made Satia see the strong impact of historical arguments on moral concerns. It also helped her recognize a shared theme in all her earlier work: how changing views of history influenced British ideas about agency and moral responsibility during the empire era.

== Synopsis ==
The book covers about three hundred years of British imperial history, from the Enlightenment to the time of decolonization and its aftermath. Its main argument is that during the Enlightenment, the traditional view of time as cyclical shifted to a linear understanding of history aimed at progress. This new perspective became a moral framework for the modern era, giving historians, from John Stuart Mill to Winston Churchill, a significant role in policymaking. Satia states that this view of history allowed thoughtful Britons to postpone ethical judgments to an unspecified future, making imperialism "ethically thinkable," even when its violent and exploitative nature was obvious.

The book argues that historians not only interpreted major political events but also actively influenced the future that followed. Imperial control in India, the Middle East, Africa, and the Caribbean tightened while British thinkers documented histories of conquest. Rebellions were oppressively put down while historians portrayed the development of imperial governance. Decolonization was weakened as historians redefined empire during the two world wars.

Alongside this narrative is a parallel story of alternative visions from anticolonial thinkers like William Blake, Mahatma Gandhi, and E. P. Thompson. They called for ethical responsibility in the present, rather than delaying moral judgment. By the mid-twentieth century, their ideas had transformed the study of history and the ethics associated with it.

=== Key themes and arguments ===
==== Historical sensibility and conscience management ====
Satia argues that starting in the eighteenth century, a specific "historical sensibility" based on the belief that human history is inevitably moving toward progress helped shape the thoughts of those involved in empire. When faced with morally questionable actions, imperialists could set aside ethical concerns, believing that history would eventually justify their actions. This was not just simple hypocrisy; it was a culturally rooted way of thinking that made otherwise decent people part of systemic violence.

==== The role of historians ====
The book looks at how notable British historians and thinkers, including Adam Smith, Edmund Burke, the Mills (James and John Stuart), Thomas Babington Macaulay, J. R. Seeley, and Winston Churchill, offered ideas that defended and supported imperial expansion. Even critics of certain imperial actions, like John Kaye's criticism of the First Anglo-Afghan War, still played a role in upholding the larger imperial project.

==== Anticolonial alternatives ====
Against the dominant linear narrative, Satia points out anticolonial thinkers who presented different ideas about time and history. Muhammad Iqbal, Mahatma Gandhi, Saadat Hasan Manto, and Faiz Ahmed Faiz, among others, drew from cyclical and poetic traditions. They questioned the Enlightenment's goal-oriented view and stressed the need for ethical responsibility in the present.

==== Partition as paternalism ====
In Chapter 5, Satia criticizes partition of countries as a gradualist and "paternalistic" tool of nationbuilding, advanced by British policymakers in the 20th century, to "solve" inter-ethnic conflicts within states. Satia uses the 1947 Partition of India as the basis for her analysis and mentions Ireland, Palestine and Cyprus as a further supporting example. She directly connects partition being used and discussed as a viable tool of conflict resolution, to the British idea of achieving gradual historical progress, stating that "the violence [partition] will inevitably entail is considered the tolerable price of 'nationhood' ", the latter of which has been elevated to a near-mythic historical goal, one whose perceived importance is used to justify setting aside ordinary ethical standards. In cases of partition, nationhood is considered a gradual step in the right direction, justifying the suffering it causes along the way.

==== Renewing history as a tool of policymaking ====
In Chapter 6, Satia states that academic historians have surrendered their political influence to modern "objective" experts (such as political scientists and economists), who now dictate global policies using an “outdated, imperialist” mindset grounded in the British enlightenment idea of history as an arc towards progress. Historians must therefore stop simply criticizing power from the sidelines and step back into the ring to offer better, ethically grounded narratives for society.

==== Memorialization as “history-making” ====
Later in chapter 6, Satia describes memorials as a connection between academic history and public memory. They can bring hidden violence to light in a way that calls for acknowledgment. She uses the Equal Justice Initiative’s work on lynching memorials as an example. By marking the locations of terror and naming the victims, memorialization disrupts forgetfulness and questions false narratives that maintain the status quo. Satia states that taking down celebratory monuments, such as Confederate statues, is not “erasing history.” Rather, it is reversing a previous erasure. Older memorial practices altered public memory to make inequality seem normal. Further, Satia relays a tension in the hope invested in memory projects: society often wants remembrance to lead somewhere, toward healing, reconciliation, a better future. She suggests that expectation can itself be a trap, because it echoes the same progress-oriented mindset that has so often excused violence (“pain now for a better tomorrow”). Instead, she floats a different idea: the ethical “piercing” that remembrance produces, shame, recognition, grief, responsibility, may matter even if it does not culminate in a neat historical destination. That is, the moral work of confronting past wrongs can be an end in itself, not merely a tool to reach an imagined future.

== Critical reception ==
=== Newspapers and magazines ===
Maya Jasanoff, writing in The New Yorker, called it "a probing new book" that argues British views of empire remain "hostage to myth partly because historians made them so." Jasanoff praises Satia for joining "a dense body of scholarship analyzing liberal justifications for empire" while bringing fresh insight through her focus on the discipline of history itself.

Kenan Malik in The Guardian described the book as "a coruscating and important reworking of the relationship between history, historians, and empire," while also noting it was "a frustrating account" at times, observing that it "also reveals, however, perhaps unwittingly, what remains valuable in Enlightenment ideas of history and of humanity".

Pankaj Mishra named it a "Book of the Year" in the New Statesman, writing that it "bracingly describes the ways imperialist historiography has shaped visions of the future as much as the past".

Robert Gildea in The Times Literary Supplement called it "powerful and radically important".

Writing in the Financial Times, Tony Barber states that "Satia’s book raises an important question about whether historians are prosecutors and history is a court in which judgments should be passed on accused individuals."

A mixed review came from Tunku Varadarajan in The Wall Street Journal, who described it as a book exploring how the field of history "helped make empire" but raised questions about aspects of Satia's framing.

A critical review came from historian Zareer Masani (who has been deemed pro-empire by The Times of India). He criticizes Satia for conflating history, historiography, and historicism stating that "Most of Satia’s charge-sheet uses these terms as though they are interchangeable", and for relying on selective evidence, and making generalizations.

Writing in History Today, historian Sujit Sivasundaram believes the book offers a novel perspective on why historians are still expected to balance positive and negative aspects of Empire in their analysis.

=== Academic journals ===
Writing in Journal of Colonialism & Colonial History, Angus Mitchell states that Satia challenges historians to face their unwitting complicity in perpetuating narratives that accelerate ecological collapse. He refers to a part of the book that discusses the illusion of progress, as explained in The Great Derangement by Amitav Ghosh.

In his review in Journal of European Ideas, historian and Oxford lecturer Morgan Golf-French states that the boundary between Satia’s metaphorical language and her theory of a distinct 'bad conscience' driving British imperialism is frequently blurred: Satia moves beyond a textual analysis of history to propose a psychological framework for understanding the British Empire. Golf-French also takes issue with Satia not treating the French Revolution adequately in her book: The documented pessimism in Britain aroused by the French Revolution contradicts the notion of enlightenment-driven British optimism and belief in the inevitability of progress as being the defining historical ideology at the time. Golf-French sees only "few references to the rich body of modern historical scholarship" on the British Enlightenment. He also takes issue with Satia’s use of the Hindu concept of yugas and reincarnation for evidence that a cyclical model to understand history is superior to one of linear progress, calling this invocation "...a hard sell not only for many casual readers, but especially for historians brought up in the strictures of modern methodological practice."

== Awards ==
- 2020/2021 Pacific Coast Conference on British Studies Book Prize.
