= Charles Wilson (historian) =

English business historian

Charles Henry Wilson
- Born: 16 April 1914; Lincolnshire, England
- Died: 1 August 1991 (aged 77); Sydney, Australia
- Occupation: Historian
- Awards: Commander of the Order of the British Empire (CBE) (1981)

Academic background
- Doctoral advisor: J.H. Clapham

Academic work
- Discipline: History
- Sub-discipline: Business history, corporations, economic history
- Doctoral students: Peter Mathias
- Notable works: The History of Unilever: A Study in Economic Growth and Social Change (1954)

Charles Henry Wilson CBE (16 April 1914 – 1 August 1991) was an English business historian and Professor of Modern History at the University of Cambridge. His best known work is his multi-volume history of Unilever, which is credited with establishing corporate history as a subject worthy of academic attention in the UK.

== Early life and education ==
Wilson was born in Market Rasen in Lincolnshire to Joseph Edwin Wilson and Louisa Maria née Berridge. He was educated at De Aston Grammar School. His forebears included small farmers and small businessmen, which contributed to his scepticism of the Marxism that was fashionable during the 1930s.

Wilson then went on to study the historical tripos at Jesus College, Cambridge. While at Cambridge, he took part in the music club, as he played viola. Academically he was mentored by Edward Welbourne, formerly of De Aston School and a senior tutor at Emmanuel College, to delve into the history of the Dutch trade in East Anglia. He stayed at Cambridge for his postgraduate education through a research fellowship.

After briefly serving in the British Admiralty, Wilson returned to Cambridge.

== Academic career ==
Wilson's main academic contributions were to the field of business history, particularly corporations and trade.

The first two volumes of his three-volume history of Unilever were published in 1954. The series critically examined the history of Unilever, a British-Dutch consumer-goods corporation. He analyzed the stages of growth, its adaptation to market preferences, and its expansion throughout the 20th century. The book marked a shift in the way business history was studied, engaging with the study of entrepreneurs and intra-firm dynamics. The study was commissioned by Geoffrey Heyworth, chairman of Unilever, to write a large-scale, independent, academic study of the business.

In addition to business history, Wilson also challenged the conceptual paradigm around mercantilism. In contrast with the orthodox views of Swedish economic historian Eli Heckscher, Wilson sought to analyse the underlying political issues which supported mercantilist policies.

Wilson was professor of modern history at the University of Cambridge from 1965 to 1979, and served as chair for 11 of those years. Wilson later taught at the European University Institute in Florence, Italy from 1975 to 1981, where he was professor of history and civilization, and later head of the department.

Wilson was honored with the Commander of the British Empire (CBE) in 1981. He also served as a Fellow of the Royal Danish Academy (1970), Fellow of the Royal Academy of Belgium (1973), Vice President of the Royal Historical Society (1981–1986). He received honorary degrees from the University of Cambridge, the University of Groningen (1964), and the University of Louvain (1977).

== Personal life ==
Wilson married Angela Marshman, a solicitor's secretary, on 21 October 1939. Together they had one daughter. The couple divorced, and Wilson subsequently married Alena Emilie Horesovska, a school teacher from Czechoslovakia, on 23 March 1972.

During the postwar period, Wilson was a political conservative.

He died on 1 August 1991 in Sydney, Australia.

== Publications ==
- Charles Wilson, Anglo-Dutch Commerce & Finance in the Eighteenth century, Cambridge: Cambridge University Press, 1941.
- Charles Wilson, Holland and Britain, The Nations and Britain series. London: William Collins, 1946.
- Charles Wilson, The History of Unilever: A Study in Economic Growth and Social Change, 2 vols. London: Cassell & Company, 1954. Ed. Cassell 1970: ISBN 0-304-93605-7
- Charles Wilson, New Cambridge Modern History, vols. 7 and 11 (1957, 1962)
- Charles Wilson, Profit and Power and Mercantilism, 1957.
- Charles Wilson, England's Apprenticeship, 1603–1763, London: St. Martin's Press, 1965.
- Charles Wilson, Cambridge Economic History of Europe, vols. 4 and 5 (with E. E. Rich) (1967, 1977)
- Charles Wilson, The Age of Expansion: Europe and the World, 1559–1660, (ed. H. Trevor Roper, 1968)
- Charles Wilson, The Dutch Republic and the Civilisation of the Seventeenth Century, (1968)
- Charles Wilson, The Transformation of Europe, 1558–1648, (1976)
- Charles Wilson, Introduction to the Sources of European Economic History, 1500–1800, (with G. Parker, 1977)
- Charles Wilson, Australia, 1788–1988: the Creation of a Nation, (1987)

== See also ==
- Business history
