= Research Center in Entrepreneurial History =

Research center at Harvard (1948–1958)

The Research Center in Entrepreneurial History was a research center at Harvard University founded in 1948 with a grant from the Rockefeller Foundation. Led by the American economic historian Arthur H. Cole, the research center attracted numerous scholars, with varied backgrounds and religious beliefs, in the field of business and economic history such as Joseph Schumpeter, Fritz Redlich, and Thomas C. Cochran.

The center issued the first academic journal devoted to entrepreneurship named Explorations in Entrepreneurial History. During the time of its existence, the center attracted rising academic stars such as Alfred D. Chandler Jr., who would later become one of the seminal figures in the field of business history. Intellectually, the research center was influenced by the German Historical School, particularly studies on various iterations of geist, and focused on the role of the entrepreneur in the economy. However, historical research on entrepreneurship ran into methodological roadblocks and the research interest moved towards industrial corporations and neoclassical economics.

Today, the research center is seen as one of the first modern attempts to research entrepreneurship and understand the impact of entrepreneurial activities on the economy. While historical research on entrepreneurship has not found much resonance in scientific and public debates, recent decades have seen a revival of the theories of Joseph Schumpeter and more recently calls for a revival of research on entrepreneurial history.

== Factionalism and daimonic political economy ==
By 1954-55, factionalism had fractured the Research Center over: 1) the extent to which counterfactuals should be applied in economic history, evinced by the conflict between Fritz Redlich and counterfactual practitioner Robert Fogel; 2) the degree to which Redlich's and Arthur H. Cole's variants of business history should be equated with economic history, demonstrated by the conflict between Redlich and the chief proponent of a distinction, N.S.B. Gras (Redlich, however, critiqued U.S. entrepreneurs for only applying their capital-generating skills to public and private commerce); and 3) the degree of criticism of neoclassical economics in economic history, evinced by New institutional economist Douglass North's struggles with Economic History Association trustees, including Fritz Redlich. Despite the schisms, members of the Research Center were all disciples of Joseph Schumpeter (d. 1950) and Werner Sombart (d. 1941~writings frequently cited by Redlich), the principal architects of schöpferische Zerstörung revolutions in political economy. Eric Reinert further traced the transmission of ideas from Friedrich Nietzsche's Thus Spoke Zarathustra, On the Genealogy of Morality, additional Nietzschean writings, works by Johann Wolfgang von Goethe, Friedrich List ideas, and notations by Gottfried Wilhelm Leibniz into economic studies by both Werner Sombart and Joseph Schumpeter. The latter examined "the history of productive apparatus" as "the history of revolutions" and "industrial mutation---if I may use that biological term---that incessantly revolutionizes the economic structure from within, incessantly destroying the old one, incessantly creating a new one. This process of Creative Destruction is the essential fact about capitalism."

At the Research Center in Entrepreneurial History, Fritz Redlich co-authored two articles with Alfred D. Chandler Jr., a former Talcott Parsons student, in the Business History Review. Redlich served as the principal English translator of publications by Arthur Spiethoff, another von Schmoller student. He additionally expounded on Spiethoff's "economic Gestalt theory," the induction of a "material substratum"---rather than historical materialism---within a given temporal moment, amidst changing historical contingencies, whilst considering the "spirit" of ideas and impulses, but not everlasting ideals as a matter of course, in political economy. In a similar vein, Redlich began to publish articles, along with Arthur Cole, on the idea of an "individualist, daimonic political economy" that pushed advocates of both laissez-faire and communism into accepting "businesspeople, and generally business history, as the fountainhead of economic theory." For example, Redlich observed that " 'Adam Smith and the classical economists presupposed that the business man in following his own interests would develop his own enterprises and, automatically, the economic life of his nation.' " Redlich and Cole both believed that the idea of " 'daimonic political economy' " undermined this presupposition not only by addressing conceptions of " 'irrationality,' " but also by " 'accepting' " political economy as " 'personalities,' " for “ 'only in personalities does the daimonic receive power.' " Cole "sought to grasp the whole of economic life, of global commercial society properly understood as the dynamic interaction of resources, entrepreneurs, firms, and states in an international system." Redlich agreed that, " 'as applied to economic daimonry in the [world] capitalistic system, economic daimonry achieves its power in the entrepreneur,' " but added that, in order to fulfill this goal, one must at least consider " 'history of the given national economy from the personal angle'...only by considering the granularity of micro-activity could one understand the concomitant unfolding of the macro-economy." For both Redlich and Cole, the " 'acceptance' " of " 'daimonic political economy' " was the first step in this unity of understanding that "institutional and economic change in society" was only possible "through an intense engagement with the schizophrenic core of the daimonic, that is with its capacity to create, destroy, creatively create, creatively destroy, and, of course, destructively destroy," as well as to interconnect these "diverse manifestations." Only after full immersion into this "core" of " 'daimonic political economy' " would a scholar begin to " 'verstehen,' " glossed as "the way to truly understand," the researching, writing, and representing of " 'history.' "

=== A note on Fritz Redlich and Germany ===
Fritz Redlich opposed and satirized the antisemitism of Nazi Germany as well as Third Reich iterations of lebensraum. As late as 1976, however, he continued to cite Eduard Wechssler's (mis)interpretations of Karl Mannheim's theory of generations. Redlich did so in order to sustain his own conceived "generation's" pre-Nazi zeitgeist in fin-de-siècle sociocultural evolution. He also periodically returned to his notion of reizbarkeit, which he glossed in English as " 'Impressionism' [instead of 'a choleric nationalism']," in order to explain the conceptual underpinnings of " 'my work.' " In 1964, he elaborated on reizbarkeit as “ 'half or entire nights spent alone in harmony with the nature of the [German] homeland [that] cannot be separated from my intellectual development' ” as well as a life commitment " 'to defend the inherited cultural patrimony and the ravines of the Reich.' " In a 2018 conference paper, Monika Poettinger argued that, "as apparent from his own recount, Redlich did not regret his involvement in nationalist movements," although he distinguished such movements from "extremism." For instance, Redlich endorsed Gustav Stresemann and the German People's Party during the Weimar Republic. In 1964, Redlich disclosed that he even joined the German People's Party's Reichsklub, "notwithstanding that the Volkspartei had a clear-cut position in regard to the Judenfrage, the party accepted among its rank the Jews who had proved their German nationalist sentiments."

== Bernard Bailyn at the Research Center ==
In 1952, historian Bernard Bailyn began receiving financial and career support from the Research Center. Bailyn described his early 1950s colleagues at the Research Center as an "excellent group, led by Arthur Cole of the Harvard Business School. The ultimate intellectual influence behind the center was [Joseph] Schumpeter." Schumpeter examined "the history of revolutions" and "industrial mutation...that incessantly revolutionizes the economic structure 'from within,' incessantly destroying the old one, incessantly creating a new one. This process of Creative Destruction is the essential fact about capitalism."

In 1953, Bailyn observed that studies of "associations" among "colonial merchants" and "entrepreneurs" as a "social group" contributed to "the movement that led to Revolution." A year later, Bailyn noted that this "merchant group" had also captured the attentions of 1940s and 1950s "students of business and entrepreneurial history." For these "economic historians," it had become "clear that the colonial merchants were never a 'class'...were they not, then, at least 'conservatives?' It depends when. They were radicals throughout the revolutionary agitation---radicals not only in regard to the question of home rule but also to the question 'of who shall rule at home.' "

At the Research Center, Bailyn gravitated toward a "a strange, eccentric, but very learned man, Fritz Redlich." In 1994, Bailyn still recommended essays, articles, and books by Redlich. During his stint at the Research Center, Bailyn believed that he had detected a pattern by the mid-eighteenth century: a given "colonial" merchant "attains a position on the colonial Council, creates friendships with influential peoples in England...The heir grows up in a different society from that of his father, solidifies the family position in Anglican officialdom...and becomes a colonial member of the British ruling class." After the Stamp Act Crisis, "the merchants discovered that they could no longer satisfy their fundamental interests [so] they rose in protest against the new imperial policies and demanded the rights of Englishmen...New England merchants reacted not as a unit but as individuals" with "common interests."
