= International scientific committee on price history =

The International Scientific Committee on Price History was created in 1929 by William Beveridge and Edwin Francis Gay after receiving a five-year grant from the Rockefeller Foundation. The national representatives were William Beveridge for Great Britain, Moritz John Elsas for Germany, Edwin Francis Gay for the United States, Earl J. Hamilton for Spain, Henri Hauser for France and Alfred Francis Pribram for Austria; later, Franciszek Bujak for Poland and Nicolaas Wilhelmus Posthumus for the Netherlands also joined; Arthur H. Cole was in charge of finances for the whole project.

== Books by the committee ==
- Hamilton (Earl J.), American Treasure and the Price Revolution in Spain (1501–1650), 1934.
- Hamilton (Earl J.), Money, Prices and Wages in Valencia, Aragon and Navarre (1351–1500), 1936.
- Hauser (Henri), Recherches et documents sur l’histoire des prix en France de 1500 à 1800, 1936.
- Elsas (Moritz John), Umriß einer Geschichte der Preise und Löhne in Deutschland vom ausgehenden Mittelalter bis zum Beginn des 19. Jarhunderts, 3 vol., 1936–1949.
- Přibram (Alfred Francis), Materialien zur Geschichte der Preise und Löhne in Österreich, 1938.
- Cole (Arthur Harrison), Wholesale Commodity Prices in the United States 1700–1861, 1938.
- Beveridge (William H.), Prices and Wages in England from the 12th to the 19th Century, 1939.
- Posthumus (Nicolaas), Nederlandsche Prijsgeschiedenis, 1943–1964.
- Hamilton (Earl J.), War and Prices in Spain (1651–1800), 1947.
