= Rondo Cameron =

American professor of economic history

- Born: 20 February 1925; Linden, Texas
- Died: 1 January 2001 (aged 75); Atlanta, Georgia
- Occupations: Historian, academic

Academic background
- Education: Yale University; University of Chicago (PhD)
- Thesis: French Foreign Investment, 1850–1880 (1952)
- Doctoral advisor: Earl J. Hamilton

Academic work
- Discipline: Economic history
- Institutions: University of Wisconsin–Madison (1952–1969); Emory University (1969–1993)
- Doctoral students: John R. Lampe; Richard H. Tilly
- Notable students: John Henry Coatsworth

Rondo Emmett Cameron (February 20, 1925 – January 1, 2001) was an American economic historian and academic, who taught at the University of Wisconsin–Madison and Emory University.

== Biography ==
Cameron was born in Linden, Texas into a family of Scottish descent. He served as a pilot in the United States Air Force during the World War II. Assisted by the G.I. Bill, he then graduated with a master's degree from Yale University in 1948 and received a Ph.D. degree in economics under the supervision of Earl J. Hamilton at the University of Chicago in 1952.

He taught at the University of Wisconsin, Madison from 1952, was appointed professor in 1961, and launched and directed Madison's graduate program in economic history. Having received a number of Rockefeller Foundation grants, he became its officer in Latin America in 1965. He led a research project at the University of Chile Institute of Economy and Planning in 1966. In 1969, after several years spent in Santiago (where the University of Wisconsin–Madison had established its Land Tenure Center), he was hired by Emory University in Atlanta and occupied the William R. Kenan Jr. Professorship from 1969 until his retirement in 1993. He also held visiting professorships in Glasgow, Paris and Santiago.

He was elected to the Executive Committee of the International Economic History Association for the period from 1978 to 1986, and served as IEHA's vice president from 1986 to 1990. He co-chaired the program committee of the American Historical Association in 1983, and edited The Journal of Economic History over a period of six years.

During the 1960s and 1970s, he led an international research project that tested Alexander Gerschenkron's hypothesis about the impact of commercial banks on the degree of economic development through a comparative study of national banking systems. This quantitative and structural approach, emanating from Harvard University's Research Center in Entrepreneurial History, has been described as the "Gerschenkron–Cameron school". It was followed by Cameron's doctoral student at Madison, John R. Lampe.

Cameron, who described himself as an "educator", achieved prominence as the author of A Concise Economic History of the World: From Paleolithic Times to the Present (1989), written as a "textbook for upper-level undergraduates" from a Eurocentric perspective, and translated into twelve languages. According to the preface, the book was many years in the maturing, with passages in one chapter from an introductory undergraduate lecture at Yale in 1951.

He died in Atlanta on January 1, 2001, leaving two children from his marriage to Claydean.

== Books ==
=== Authored ===
- France and the Economic Development of Europe, 1800–1914: Conquests of Peace and Seeds of War (1961; 2nd abridged edn., with Max E. Fletcher, 1965)
- The European World: A History (with Jerome Blum and Thomas G. Barnes, 1967; 2nd edn. 1970)
- Banking in the Early Stages of Industrialization: A Study in Comparative Economic History (1967)
- A Concise Economic History of the World: From Paleolithic Times to the Present (1989; 4th edn., with Larry Neal, 2003)

=== Edited ===
- Essays in French Economic History (1970)
- Civilization Since Waterloo: A Book of Source Readings (1971)
- Banking and Economic Development: Some Lessons of History (1972)
- International Banking, 1870–1914 (with Valery Ivanovich Bovykin, 1991)
- Financing Industrialization (2 vols., 1992)

== Sources ==
- Tortella, Gabriel (2001), "Rondo Cameron, 1925-2001", Revista de Historia Económica, 19 (1): 11–14
