= Christina Lubinski =

German historian (born 1979)

Christina Lubinski (born January 31, 1979) is a German historian and a full professor at Copenhagen Business School. She is the author and editor of numerous academic books and journals articles. Her work is published in leading international and peer-reviewed journals in the fields of business history, entrepreneurship, management, and organizational studies.

== Life ==
Christina Lubinski studied Business Economics, Economic History, and History at the Universities of Göttingen (Germany), Brussels (Université Libre, Belgium), and Geneva (Switzerland). In 2009 the University of Göttingen awarded her a Ph.D. in business history for a thesis on family business in West Germany (Familienunternehmen in Westdeutschland. Corporate Governance und Gesellschafterkultur seit den 1960er Jahren) supervised by Hartmut Berghoff. Thereafter, she worked as a research fellow at the German Historical Institute in Washington DC until 2014. During this time she spent one year at Harvard Business School, where she was a Post-Doctoral Researcher (Newcomen Fellow) working with Geoffrey G. Jones. Since 2014 Lubinski is a professor at Copenhagen Business School in Denmark. Between 2018 and 2019, she was a visiting professor for Clinical Entrepreneurial Studies at Marshall School of Business at the University of Southern California in Los Angeles. Since 2019, Christina is a full professor at Copenhagen Business School and the head of the Centre for Business History (since 2020).

== Research ==
Christina Lubinski uses historical methods and original sources to develop new perspectives on management and entrepreneurship. Her research falls into two broad areas. On the one hand, Lubinski researches the interplay between nationalism and competition in multinational companies. In particular, she is interested in German companies in India. Her research has contributed to a new understanding of nationalism and its relation to economic decision-making by showing that companies actively use emerging nationalist thinking to delegitimize other companies to gain competitive advantages. On the other hand, she is interested in historical methods in particular in entrepreneurship research. In this area of her research, Lubinski builds on her early works on family businesses. She shows both empirically and theoretically, that historical methods can make a significant contribution to entrepreneurial research. Together with R. Dan Wadhwani, she is a strong proponent of a revival of historical entrepreneurship research that builds upon the works of Arthur H. Cole and Joseph Schumpeter at the Research Center in Entrepreneurial History at Harvard University.

Lubinski has won numerous awards for her research work, such as the 1st prize for business history for her dissertation awarded by the German Society for Business History in 2009 (Gesellschaft für Unternehmensgeschichte e.V.) and the Henrietta Larson Award for the best article in Business History Review in 2015.

== Publications (selection) ==
=== Books ===
- Da Silva Lopes, T., C. Lubinski and H. Tworek, eds. (2019). The Routledge Companion to the Makers of Global Business. New York, Routledge.
- Lubinski, C., J. R. Fear and P. Fernández Pérez, eds. (2013). Family Multinationals: Entrepreneurship, Governance, and Pathways to Internationalization. New York, Routledge.
- Berghoff, H., U. Jensen, C. Lubinski and B. Weisbrod, eds. (2013). History by Generations: Generational Dynamics in Modern History. Göttingen, Wallstein Verlag
- Lubinski, C. (2009). Mikropolitik und flexible Spezialisierung. Das Beispiel der mechanischen Werkstätten der Handelsgesellschaft Jacobi, Haniel und Huyssen (JHH) im 19. Jahrhundert. Göttingen, Universitätsverlag Göttingen.
- Lubinski, C. (2010). Familienunternehmen in Westdeutschland: Corporate Governance und Gesellschafterkultur seit den 1960er Jahren. Schriftenreihe zur Zeitschrift für Unternehmensgeschichte. München, Verlag C.H. Beck.

=== Journal articles ===
- Lubinski, C., V. Giacomin and K. Schnitzer (2021). Internment as a Business Challenge: Political Risk Management and German Multinationals in Colonial India (1914–1947). Business History, 63(1): 72–97.
- Lubinski, C. and R. D. Wadhwani (2020). Geopolitical Jockeying: Economic Nationalism and Multinational Strategy in Historical Perspective. Strategic Management Journal, 41(3): 400–421.
- Lubinski, C. (2018). From ‘History as Told’ to ‘History as Experienced’: Contextualizing the Uses of the Past. Organization Studies 39(12): 1785–1809.
- Wadhwani, R. D. and C. Lubinski (2017) Reinventing Entrepreneurial History. Business History Review 91(4): 767–99.
- Lubinski, C. and M. Kipping (2015). Translating Potential into Profits: Foreign Multinationals in Emerging Markets since the Nineteenth Century. Management and Organizational History 10(2): 93–102.
- Lubinski, C. (2014). Liability of Foreignness in Historical Context: German Business in Preindependence India (1880–1940). Enterprise & Society 15(4): 722–758
- Lubinski, C. (2011). Path Dependency and Governance in German Family Firms. Business History Review 85(4): 699–724.
- Lubinski, C. (2010). Zwischen Familienerbe und globalem Markt. Die Corporate Governance westdeutscher Familienunternehmen von den 1960er Jahren bis in die Gegenwart. Zeitschrift für Unternehmensgeschichte 55(2): 204–229.
