= Business History (journal) =

- Discipline: Business history
- Language: English
- Edited by: Christina Lubinski, Niall Mackenzie

Publication details
- History: 1958-present
- Publisher: Routledge
- Frequency: 8/year
- Impact factor: 1.1 (2022)

Standard abbreviations
- ISO 4: Bus. Hist.

Indexing
- ISSN: 0007-6791 (print); 1743-7938 (web)
- LCCN: 65034644
- OCLC no.: 42884007

Links
- Journal homepage; Online access; Online archive

Business History is a peer-reviewed academic journal covering the field of business history. It was established in 1958 by Liverpool University Press and is now published by Routledge. The editors-in-chief are Christina Lubinski (Copenhagen Business School), and Niall MacKenzie (University of Strathclyde).

== Abstracting and indexing ==
The journal is abstracted and indexed in:

- ABI/Inform
- British Humanities Index
- EBSCOhost
- EconLit
- GEOBASE
- Geographical Abstracts
- PAIS International
- Scopus
- Sociological Abstracts
- Social Sciences Citation Index

According to the Journal Citation Reports, the journal has a 2022 impact factor of 1.1.
