= Leslie Hannah =

British economic historian and academic

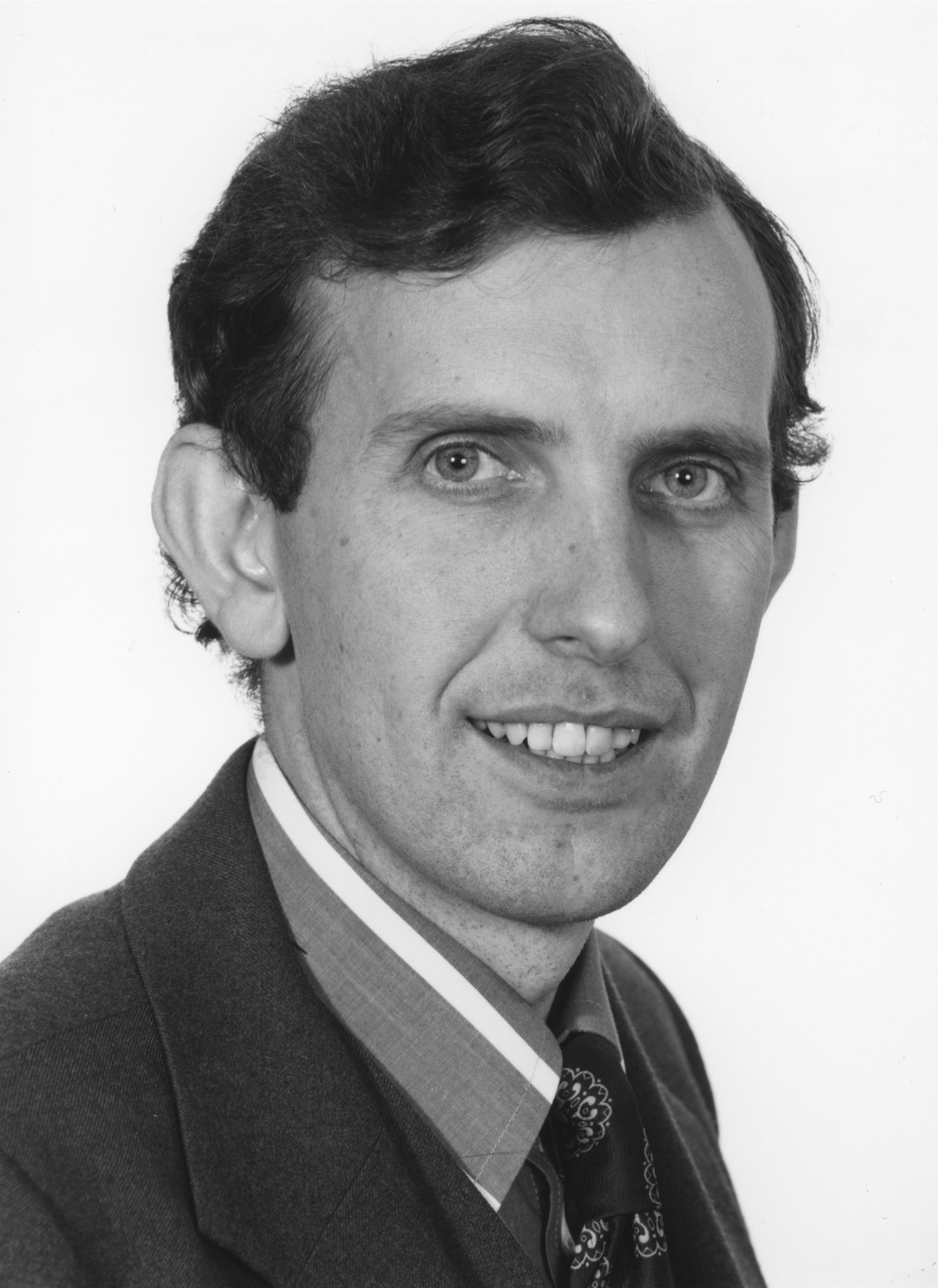
- Professor Hannah c. 1980
- Born: 15 June 1947 (age 79)

Academic background
- Education: University of Oxford
- Thesis: The political economy of mergers in manufacturing industry in Britain between the wars (1972)

Academic work
- Discipline: Economic history
- Sub-discipline: Business history
- Institutions: London School of Economics; University of Tokyo

Leslie Hannah, FBA (born 15 June 1947) is a British economic historian and academic, specialising in business history. During his academic career, he was most closely associated with the London School of Economics. His work focuses on the development of corporations, pensions and banking.

Hannah first became a research fellow at St John's College, Oxford in 1969. After posts at Essex and Cambridge, he moved to the London School of Economics where he remained throughout his career. He also had visiting professorships at Harvard Business School, in Tokyo and Paris.

In July 2019, he was elected a Fellow of the British Academy (FBA), the United Kingdom's national academy for the humanities and social sciences.

== Publications ==
Books

- The rise of the corporate economy: the British experience (Baltimore: Johns Hopkins University Press, 1976)
- The rise of the corporate economy (Methuen, 1983 and Routledge, 2010)
- Management strategy and business development: an historical and comparative study (London: Macmillan, 1976)
- with J.A. Kay: Concentration in modern industry: theory, measurement and the U.K. experience (London: Macmillan, 1977)
- Electricity before nationalisation: a study of the development of the electricity supply industry in Britain to 1948 (London: Macmillan, 1979)
- Engineers, managers and politicians: electricity supply industry in Britain from 1948 to the present (London: Macmillan, 1982)
- with Margaret Ackrill: Barclays: the business of banking, 1690-1996 (Cambridge: Cambridge University Press, 2007)
- Inventing retirement: the development of occupational pensions in Britain (Cambridge: Cambridge University Press, 1986 and 2009)

Chapters in edited works

- 'A failed experiment: the state ownership of industry', in R. Floud and P. Johnson (eds), The Cambridge economic history of modern Britain: Vol.3 structural change and growth, 1939-2000 (Cambridge: Cambridge University Press, 2004).

== See also ==
- UK company law
- UK labour law
