= William Richard Scott =

American sociologist (born 1932)

W. Richard Scott
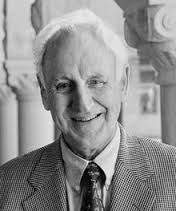
- Long-time Stanford University faculty member.
- Born: 18 December 1932 (age 93); Parsons, Kansas, U.S.
- Occupation: Professor Emeritus at Stanford University

William Richard Scott (born December 18, 1932) is an American sociologist, and Emeritus Professor at Stanford University, specialised in institutional theory and organisation science. He is known for his research on the relation between organizations and their institutional environments.

== Biography ==
Born in Parsons, Kansas to Charles H. Scott and Hildegarde Hewil, Scott received his PhD from the University of Chicago under Peter Blau, and has received honorary doctorates from the Copenhagen School of Business (2000), the Helsinki School of Economics and Business (2001), and Aarhus University in Denmark (2010).

Scott has spent his entire professional career at Stanford, serving as chair of the Sociology Department (1972–1975), as director of the Training Program on Organizations and Mental Health (1972–1989), and as director of the Stanford Center for Organizations Research (1988–1996). Since 1997 he is Professor Emeritus in the Department of Sociology with courtesy appointments in the Graduate School of Business, Graduate School of Education, and School of Medicine at Stanford University.

Scott was elected to membership in the National Academy of Medicine in 1975. In 1988 he was recipient of the Distinguished Scholar Award from the Management and Organization Theory Division of the Academy of Management. In 1996 he was awarded the Richard D. Irwin Award for Distinguished Scholarly Contributions to Management from the Academy of Management. In 2013 he received the Distinguished Educator Award from the same Division; and in 2015, he was named the Eminent Scholar of the Year by the Academy of International Business.

Scott served as editor of the Annual Review of Sociology (1987–1991), and as president of the Sociological Research Association (2006–2007).

In 2000, the Section on Organization, Occupations and Work of the American Sociological Association created the W. Richard Scott Award to annually recognize an outstanding article-length contribution to the field.

== Work ==
Scott is an organizational sociologist who has concentrated his work on the study of professional organizations, including educational, engineering, medical, research, social welfare, and nonprofit advocacy organizations. During the past three decades, he has concentrated his writing and research on the relation between organizations and their institutional environments. He is the author or editor of about twenty books and more than 200 articles and book chapters.

== Selected publications ==
- Scott, W. R. Martin Ruef, Peter J. Mendel, and Carol A. Caronna. (2000). Institutional change and healthcare organizations: From professional dominance to managed care. University of Chicago Press.
- Scott, W. Richard, and Gerald F. Davis. Organizations and organizing: Rational Natural and Open System Perspectives, Pearson/Prentice Hall, 2006, (sixth edition).
- Duncan, O. D., Scott, W. R., Lieberson, S., Duncan, B. D., & Winsborough, H. H. Metropolis and region. Routledge. 2013.
- Scott, W. Richard. Institutions and organizations: Ideas, interests, and identities. Sage Publications, (2014) (fourth edition)
- McLaughlin, Milbrey et al. Between movement and establishment: Organizations advocating for youth. Stanford University Press, 2009.
- Scott, W. Richard, Michael W. Kirst, and colleagues. Higher Education and Silicon Valley: Connected but Conflicted. Johns Hopkins University Press, 2017.
