= Empire of Guns: The Violent Making of the Industrial Revolution =

2018 book by Priya Satia

Empire of Guns: The Violent Making of the Industrial Revolution is a 2018 nonfiction book by American Stanford University historian Priya Satia, published by Penguin Press. The book argues that war and the British gun trade were central to the Industrial Revolution, challenging conventional narratives that attribute Britain's industrialization primarily to innovation, coal, or consumerism. It was named one of the best books of 2018 by the San Francisco Chronicle and won multiple scholarly prizes, including the American Historical Association's 2019 Jerry Bentley Prize in World History, and the 2019 Wadsworth Prize, sponsored by the Business Archives Council.

== Background ==
Priya Satia is the Raymond A. Spruance Professor of International History at Stanford University, specializing in modern British and British Empire history. She was educated at Stanford, the London School of Economics, and received her PhD from the University of California, Berkeley in 2004. Empire of Guns is her second book, following Spies in Arabia: The Great War and the Cultural Foundations of Britain's Covert Empire in the Middle East (2008).

== Content ==
The book covers the time from the Glorious Revolution of 1688 to the end of the Napoleonic Wars in 1815. It explores the social, economic, and material life of British guns during over a century of almost continuous warfare. It is divided into three parts that look at the industrial, social, and moral aspects of guns.

=== The Birmingham Gun Trade ===
Birmingham is the main focus of the story. Satia shows that the city's metal trades and arms production were established before Manchester's textile industry drove industrial growth. Key innovations, such as the division of labor, were already present in arms manufacturing long before factory production in textiles. Military procurement accounted for about eighty percent of government spending between 1688 and 1815. This connection between warfare and industrial progress was significant.

=== Samuel Galton Jr. ===
The main narrative follows Samuel Galton Jr., a well-known Birmingham gunmaker and Quaker. He faced condemnation from his fellow Quakers for going against their peaceful beliefs through his work in the weapons trade. Galton argued that the British state's heavy dependence on industry for its war needs meant everyone in the industrial economy, employers, employees, investors, and taxpayers, was involved in Britain’s ongoing state of war. Satia uses this moral dilemma to highlight broader issues of societal involvement in the military-industrial economy.

=== Guns in Colonial and Social Life ===
Satia explores how guns were more than just weapons. They served as status symbols, gifts, currency, and signs of power throughout the British Empire. In colonial areas like North America, Africa, and India, guns influenced social relationships and acted as tools of "frontier diplomacy." In West Africa, guns held value and worked as goods and a means of trade in the slave market. At home, guns became linked to property protection, highlighting Parliament's clear distinction between property owners and those without property.

=== Thesis ===
Satia does not claim the gun industry was the sole driver of the Industrial Revolution. She also does not downplay the significance of coal and cotton. Instead, she views the arms industry as a key to understanding how government spending, private businesses, and colonial growth worked together as powerful economic forces. She challenges what she sees as “simple free-market narratives” of British industrialization. The book draws parallels between the early impact of the arms industry and the modern rise of Silicon Valley, where government investment also supported technological advancement.

== Critical reception ==
Writing in The New York Times, Jonathan Knee commends Satia for effectively challenging the traditional view of war as an economic hindrance. By presenting extensive evidence of the deep connections between war, government intervention, and industrial development, Satia offers a fresh perspective on the Industrial Revolution. The review also underscores Satia's emphasis on the crucial role of collaboration between the government and the private sector in fostering innovation and economic growth during the Industrial Revolution. Knee believes Satia's argument convincingly shows how public-private sector collaboration was a contradiction of "simple free-market narratives". This partnership, particularly in the arms industry, led to significant advancements in various British economic sectors, from finance to mining. Knee also praises Satia's examination of the evolving social and moral implications of guns. Through the case of Samuel Galton Jr., a Quaker gunmaker, Satia reveals the changing attitudes towards guns as their technology and societal impact shifted over time.

The book is "a triumph" as "a study of guns, violence and empire," English historian Emma Griffin writes in The Guardian. However, Griffin finds its argument that war caused the Industrial Revolution problematic, as other countries, like Switzerland, industrialized without war.

A review by American economist Warren C. Whatley in Journal of British Studies praises the book as a bold and ambitious work stating that it redefines the Industrial Revolution by focusing on the British armament industry instead of textiles. The book highlights how the state played an active role in shaping production technology through its connections with Birmingham gun manufacturers and the Ordnance Office. Whatley appreciates Satia's skill in using archival sources and personal networks, but raises some concerns. The review notes that the Ordnance Office is not placed within the context of overall military spending, as navy and army budgets were much larger. Additionally, the book's claim that guns sent to Africa were mainly luxury items rather than weapons for war and slave raiding is, in the opinion of Whatley, "categorically not true," which he states raises doubts about other assertions. The second half of the book explores how guns became accepted tools for protecting private property at home and weapons for colonial expansion abroad. However, the reviewer wishes for more comparisons between countries and additional quantitative evidence. Overall, the review describes it as an important, thought-provoking, and knowledgeable book that has something for everyone, but points out that its selective use of evidence and absence of tables or graphs sometimes weaken its ambitious arguments.
