= Priya Satia =

American historian

Priya Satia is an American historian of the British Empire, with a particular focus in the Middle East and South Asia. Satia is the Raymond A. Spruance Professor of International History at Stanford University.

In addition to her academic publications, Satia has written for Time Magazine, The Nation, Slate, The New Republic and Foreign Policy Magazine. She has also contributed opinion pieces for CNN online as well as for the Washington Post and Al Jazeera.

She is on the international advisory board of Modern British History, an academic journal.

== Early life ==
She was educated at Stanford (attaining both a B.A. in international relations and a B.S. in chemistry) and the London School of Economics (receiving a master's degree in Development Economics) and received her PhD from the University of California, Berkeley in 2004. Satia grew up in Los Gatos, California.

== Themes ==
Satia's research focuses on how the material and intellectual foundations of the modern world were shaped by the era of British imperialism. She investigates the development of government bodies, military advancements, ideas about progress, and the resulting anti-colonial movements to understand how British imperialism continues to influence the present day and how the moral challenges it raised were addressed historically. More recently, Satia has also explored whether concepts of selfhood and individual agency, inherited from 'Western' ideals of classical liberalism and the Age of Enlightenment, are helpful or hurtful in understanding the impact of colonization on former colonized societies.

=== Time's Monster: How History Makes History ===
Her book "Time's Monster" examines how the discipline of history itself enabled and justified British colonialism by promoting a linear vision of historical progress, derived from the ideas of the Enlightenment in Europe. She further examines how the idea of inevitable progress, enabled British imperialists to justify what she deems morally reprehensible colonial actions by suspending ethical judgment and prioritizing future outcomes above all else. This sensibility was not limited to the British liberalism of the time but permeated British thought in general, serving as a flexible tool to rationalize contradictory actions across different imperial contexts. This work bridges the gap between public debates on the legacy of the British Empire and academic discussions on Liberalism's complicity in imperialism. The book raises questions about the limitations and alternatives to this historical sensibility, prompting further inquiry into the complex relationship between historical thought and imperial actions.

=== Empire of Guns: The Violent Making of the Industrial Revolution ===
Empire of Guns argues that war, specifically the government's demand for military equipment, drove the Industrial Revolution in Britain. This is contrary to other theories that attribute the revolution to factors like coal supplies, inventiveness, or consumerism. Satia supports her argument by examining the Birmingham gun-making industry, showing how war benefited businesses and how guns played a crucial role in British cultural and colonial expansion. Guns were not only weapons, but also status symbols, gifts, currency, and signifiers of power.

However, the book also highlights the moral complexities of the gun trade, particularly for Samuel Galton, a Quaker gunmaker who faced criticism from his pacifist community. Satia uses this conflict to illustrate the clash between militarism and emerging ideas about guns in civic life.

=== Spies in Arabia: The Great War and Britain's Covert Empire in the Middle East ===
Spies in Arabia examines how British intelligence agencies gathered intelligence in a region they saw as fundamentally unknowable. British agents cultural notions about the Middle East in the era of World War One, coupled with the insistent postwar demand of the mass-democratic British public for greater control of British foreign policy, led the British imperial state to invent a new style of what Satia terms "covert empire," centering on aerial policing, a form of colonial rule the British first applied in Iraq.

=== Essay on Significance of Kamala Harris as Vice Presidential candidate (2020) ===
In a 2020 Washington Post article, Satia analyzes the impact of representation in politics, focusing on Kamala Harris as a case study. She argues that, while representation alone doesn't guarantee radical change, it can embolden marginalized communities and create a context in which change becomes possible. Satia further highlights the disappointment of some on the left with Harris's moderate stance, drawing parallels to similar criticisms of Obama's presidency. The article counters the pessimistic view that these figures are mere tokens, arguing that representation, especially within a Democratic party reliant on minority support, matters significantly. The article then cites the Black Lives Matter movement as an example of how representation can catalyze activism, even if it arises from disillusionment. It further explores the historical context of anti-colonial struggles, emphasizing that radical change is often driven by ordinary people, but that representation can inspire and legitimize such movements.

=== Essay on the American Natural History Museum (2024) ===
In a June 2024 essay published in Indian online paper ThePrint, Satia argues that the "Hall of Asian Peoples" in the American Museum of Natural History in New York is problematic because it portrays Asian cultures as static and frozen in time, often relying on outdated, harmful and racist stereotypes. One of the examples Satia mentions is the specific way Indian society is presented in an exhibit titled 'Indian Cycle of Life' because it "...suggests India is an exclusively Hindu society, with a single, heteronormative vision of life". Another example of a statement made in another exhibit about Arab culture that Satia deems problematic is that “Islamic civilization arose primarily out of Arab respect for Greek and Roman accomplishments.” Satia believes the various misrepresentations can lead to misunderstandings and perpetuate harmful biases against Asian people and suggests that the museum needs to update its exhibits to reflect the dynamism and diversity of Asian and Middle Eastern cultures, and to do so in a way that is accurate.

The essay was criticized by Samuel Abrams, who serves as a Nonresident Senior Fellow of the conservative-leaning American Enterprise Institute, Faculty Fellow at NYU's Center for Advanced Social Science Research and as a professor of Politics at Sarah Lawrence College.

=== Forgotten Dreams of History (2024) ===
In “The Forgotten Dreams of History-from-Below” (Journal of Social History, 2024), Priya Satia revisits Harvard historian Walter Johnson’s 2003 critiques of the concepts of “agency” and “unidirectional" trade between past and present. Satia states that the concept of agency’s mid-20th century, anticolonial/New Left birth aimed instead to forge a contested two‑way trade linking past and present. Further, Johnson's argument, namely that academic discussion around the concept of agency became therapeutic rather than political, more describes its later academic use rather than the concept of agency's origins in post‑war decolonization. Satia traces history‑from‑below (an approach sometimes known as people's history) to anticolonial (e.g. Gandhi, Fanon and Muhammad Iqbal) and New Left currents (e.g. E. P. Thompson) that challenged so-called whiggish progress and liberal concepts of individuated selfhood (a concept Satia defines as the liberal‑Enlightenment model of the person: a coherent, autonomous individual with a stable inner core, set apart from porous, relational, or collective identities). Gandhi and the other thinkers challenged whiggish liberalism by seeking a two‑way exchange between past and present. This entails the rejection of liberalism’s 'ends‑justify‑the‑means' approach and instead insists that freedom be practiced in the very act of struggle. Satia notes the gendered, racial, and imperial limits of this early work that challenged whiggish liberalism, and states that eventual incorporation of these ideas into a "neoliberal" corporatized academy (which refers to the university as an institution) only reinforced how limited they are. Satia states that once the language of agency was absorbed by the setting of a corporatized western university, it often reaffirmed the universality of a liberal self and defaulted to setting out to prove marginalized groups’ “humanity,” rather than reimagining forms of selfhood, struggle and action. Johnson’s proposed corrective, namely shifting attention to forms of agency such as collaboration and betrayal risks, according to Satia’, a methodological barrier because it still presumes a coherent liberal subject. It therefore misses the decentered, agonistic ways colonized people acted: complying while hating, resisting while collaborating, and remaking the self in the process. She further notes that, while historian E. P. Thompson elevated English working‑class actors, subsequent feminist and postcolonial critiques 'exposed' this approach as deficient: Joan Scott identified gendered exclusions, while Robert Gregg and Madhavi Kale showed how the very category of the “free‑born Englishman” itself relied on an imperial order that normalized enslaved and indentured labour, and that deemed slave rebellions a "diabolical refusal of progress". In Satia's view this leaves an opposition between male European agency and feminized, colonized and irrational “others” intact, illustrating a usage of “agency” that was granted to some while denied to others.

=== Essay in Journal of British Studies (2025) ===
In a 2025 Journal of British Studies essay titled The Scholarly Business of Corporations and Slavery: Political Fault Lines of the Economic History of Empire, Satia states that distinctions between “public” and “private” have distorted accounts of the British Empire by obscuring how chartered companies operated as extensions of the state. Further she states that state-driven militarism, slavery, and Atlantic and Asian trades were deeply intertwined. Reassessing recent syntheses (including Philip Stern’s Empire, Incorporated and Maxine Berg and Pat Hudson’s Slavery, Capitalism and the Industrial Revolution), she contends that framing choices can inadvertently minimize the economic effects of imperialism and slavery and the responsibility of the British state. The essay also highlights the marginalization of Black and brown scholars, such as Eric Williams, Joseph Inikori, Utsa and Prabhat Patnaik, and Gurminder K. Bhambra, whose work underpins evidence of Britain’s profits from empire and informs contemporary debates over the “drain” of wealth from colonies and reparations. Satia maintains that exact cost–benefit tallies are less important than acknowledging long-standing patterns of extraction and their ethical implications, and she urges historians to abandon inherited colonial-era categories, avoid overstating novelty, and describe more clearly the causal role of imperialism and slavery in the development of Britain’s industrial capitalism.

=== Foreign Policy article on AI (2026) ===
In an October 2026 Foreign Policy article "AI Isn't a Revolution – Yet," Satia argues that technological breakthroughs do not automatically trigger societal revolutions. Rather, social movements, labor resistance, and political institutions dictate whether, how fast, and on whose terms an invention reshapes the world. Drawing a parallel to Britain's Industrial Revolution, she states that the transition to steam power unfolded gradually because workers and what she calls "forward-looking" Luddites resisted its social dislocations and demanded democratic, ethical constraints on automation. She notes that "[t]hey presented such a threat to the oligarchy that the government spared massive amounts of troops to suppress them even as it fought Napoleon around the world". Challenging what she characterizes as Silicon Valley's "self-serving" rhetoric of technological inevitability, Satia writes that AI is the product of deliberate, state-supported investment rather than an unstoppable market force. She contends that because the U.S. government remains too closely partnered with tech firms to hold them accountable on its own, the American public will decide whether an "AI revolution" takes place through new forms of workplace unionization and collective action.

== Reception of work ==
=== Time's Monster ===
In an article titled "The book that changed me: how Priya Satia’s Time’s Monster landed like a bomb in my historian’s brain," historian Yves Rees discusses the impact of Priya Satia's book on their understanding of history's role in justifying and normalizing violence. Rees highlights Satia's exploration of how 18th- and 19th-century British historians used their craft to rationalize imperial expansion, creating a historical narrative that obscured what Rees sees as the violence and exploitation inherent in colonialism. The article emphasizes and reiterates Satia's call for historians to confront their discipline's complicity in perpetuating injustice, urging a reckoning with the ethical implications of historical narratives.

Writing in the Financial Times, Tony Barber states that "Satia’s book raises an important question about whether historians are prosecutors and history is a court in which judgments should be passed on accused individuals."

Maya Jasanoff of the New Yorker praised Satia for the book's probing analysis of how British historians have shaped, and often distorted, the nation's view of its imperial past. Jasanoff finds Satia's arguments compelling, particularly her focus on the role of historians like James Mill in perpetuating the idea that imperialism brought progress to colonized lands. The book is also commended for highlighting the erasure of historical records by British officials, further obscuring the true nature of imperial rule.

Pankaj Mishra named Time's Monster a "Book of the Year" in the New Statesman.

A critical review came from historian Zareer Masani (who has been deemed pro-empire by The Times of India). He criticizes Satia for conflating history, historiography, and historicism stating that "Most of Satia’s charge-sheet uses these terms as though they are interchangeable", and for relying on selective evidence, and making generalizations.

=== Empire of Guns ===
Writing in The New York Times, Jonathan Knee commends Satia for effectively challenging the traditional view of war as an economic hindrance. By presenting extensive evidence of the deep connections between war, government intervention, and industrial development, Satia offers a fresh perspective on the Industrial Revolution. The review also underscores Satia's emphasis on the crucial role of collaboration between the government and the private sector in fostering innovation and economic growth during the Industrial Revolution. Knee believes Satia's argument convincingly shows how public-private sector collaboration was a contradiction of "simple free-market narratives". This partnership, particularly in the arms industry, led to significant advancements in various British economic sectors, from finance to mining. Knee also praises Satia's examination of the evolving social and moral implications of guns. Through the case of Samuel Galton Jr., a Quaker gunmaker, Satia reveals the changing attitudes towards guns as their technology and societal impact shifted over time.

The book is "a triumph" as "a study of guns, violence and empire," historian Emma Griffin writes in The Guardian. However, Griffin finds its argument that war caused the Industrial Revolution problematic, as other countries, like Switzerland, industrialized without war.

== Awards ==
- 2020/2021 Pacific Coast Conference on British Studies Book Prize (For Time’s Monster: How History Makes History)
- Time’s Monster: How History Makes History listed (nominated by Pankaj Mishra) as one of the Books of the Year (2020) by New Statesman
- 2019 Jerry Bentley Prize in World History (For Empire of Guns: The Violent Making of the Industrial Revolution) from the American Historical Association
- 2019 Pacific Coast Conference on British Studies Book Prize (For Empire of Guns: The Violent Making of the Industrial Revolution)
- 2018 BAC Wadsworth Prize (For Empire of Guns: The Violent Making of the Industrial Revolution)
- 2009 AHA-Herbert Baxter Adams Book Prize (For Spies in Arabia: The Great War and the Cultural Foundations of Britain's Covert Empire in the Middle East)

== Publications ==
- Satia, Priya (2008). Spies in Arabia: The Great War and the Cultural Foundations of Britain's Covert Empire in the Middle East. Oxford University Press. doi:10.1093/acprof:oso/9780195331417.001.0001. ISBN 9780195331417.
- Satia, Priya (2018). Empire of Guns: The Violent Making of the Industrial Revolution. Penguin Books. ISBN 978-0-7352-2186-4. OCLC 1039333835.
- Satia, Priya (2020). Time's Monster: How History Makes History. Harvard University Press. ISBN 978-0-674-24837-3. OCLC 1151894978.
