= Business history =

Business history is a historiographical field which examines the history of firms, business methods, government regulation and the effects of business on society. It also includes biographies of individual firms, executives, and entrepreneurs. It is related to economic history. It is distinct from "company history" which refers to official histories, usually funded by the company itself.

== United States ==
=== Robber baron debate ===
Even before academic studies began, Americans were enthralled by the Robber baron debate.

As the United States industrialized very rapidly after the Civil War, a few hundred prominent men made large fortunes by building and controlling major industries, such as railroads, shipping, steel, mining and banking. Yet the newer who gathered the most attention was railroader Cornelius Vanderbilt. Historian Stephen Frazier argues that probably most Americans admired Vanderbilt; they agreed with biographer William Augustus Croffut who wrote in 1886:

It is now known that the desire to own property is the chief difference between the Savage and the enlightened man; that aggregations of money in the hands of individuals are in inestimable blessing to Society, for without them there could be no public improvements or private enterprises, no railroads or steamships, or telegraphs; no cities, the leisure class, no schools, colleges, literature, art – in short, no civilization. The one man to whom the community owes most is the capitalist, that the menu gives, but the man who saves and invests, so that his property reproduces and multiplies itself instead of being consumed.

However, Fraser goes on, there was a minority who vehemently dissented:

A minority were irate and excoriated the titans of finance and industry as 'robber barons' and worse. E.L. Godkin, founder of The Nation, launched a volley of invective at the new plutocracy: 'kings of the street' like Vanderbilt displayed 'unmitigated and immitigable selfishness' as appalling as their 'audacity, push, unscrupulousness and brazen disregard of others' rights'.

By the Great Depression of the 1930s, Fraser continues:

Biographies of Mellon, Carnegie and Rockefeller were often laced with moral censure, warning that 'tories of industry' were a threat to democracy and that parasitism, aristocratic pretension and tyranny have always trailed in the wake of concentrated wealth, whether accumulated dynastically or more impersonally by the faceless corporation. This scholarship, and the cultural persuasion of which it was an expression, drew on a deeply rooted sensibility–partly religious, partly egalitarian and democratic–that stretched back to William Jennings Bryan, Andrew Jackson and Tom Paine.

However a counterattack by academic historians began as the Depression ended. Business historian Allan Nevins challenged this view of big businessmen by advocating the "Industrial Statesman" thesis. Nevins, in his John D. Rockefeller: The Heroic Age of American Enterprise (2 vols., 1940), took on Josephson. He argued that while Rockefeller may have engaged in some unethical and illegal business practices, this should not overshadow his bringing order to industrial chaos of the day. Gilded Age capitalists, according to Nevins, sought to impose order and stability on competitive business, and that their work made the United States the foremost economy by the 20th century. Business journalist Ferdinand Lundberg later criticized Nevins for confusing readers. By contrast, historian Priscilla Roberts argues that Nevins' studies of inventors and businessmen brought about a reassessment of American industrialization and its leaders. She writes:

Nevins argued that economic development in the United States caused relatively little human suffering, while raising the general standard of living and making the United States the great industrial power capable of defeating Germany in both world wars. The great capitalists of that period should, he argued, be viewed, not as 'robber barons', but as men whose economic self-interest had played an essentially positive role in American history, and who had done nothing criminal by the standards of their time.

Historians have followed Nevins' lead in writing biographies of the major industrialists of the Gilded Age. These include:

- David Cannadine, Mellon: An American Life (New York: Alfred A. Knopf, 2006)
- Ron Chernow, The House of Morgan: An American Banking Dynasty and the Rise of Modern Finance (New York: Atlantic Monthly Press, 1990)
- Ron Chernow, Titan: The Life of John D. Rockefeller, Sr. (New York: Random House, 2007)
- George Harvey, Henry Clay Frick: The Man (Washington, D.C.: Beard Books, 2002)
- David Nasaw, Andrew Carnegie (New York: Penguin Press, 2006)
- T. J. Stiles, The First Tycoon: The Epic Life of Cornelius Vanderbilt (New York: Alfred A. Knopf, 2009)
- Jean Strouse, Morgan: American Financier (New York: Random House, 1999)

Though these later biographers did not confer heroic status on their subjects, they used historical and biographical investigations to establish a more complex understanding of the American past, and the history of American economic development in particular.

In 1958 historian Hal Bridges finds that "The most vehement and persistent controversy in business history has been that waged by the critics and defenders of the 'robber baron' concept of the American businessman." In terms of the Robber Baron model, by the end of the 20th-century scholars had mostly discarded it although it remained influential in the popular culture. Richard White, historian of the transcontinental railroads, stated in 2011 he has no use for the concept because it had been killed off by historians Robert H. Wiebe and Alfred Chandler. He notes that "Much of the modern history of corporations is a reaction against the Robber Barons and fictions."

=== Academic studies ===
Meanwhile, business history as an academic discipline was founded by Professor N. S. B. Gras at the Harvard University Graduate School of Business Administration, starting in 1927. He defined the field's subject matter and approach, wrote the first general treatise in the field, and helped Harvard build a tradition of scholarship as well as the leading library in the field. He edited a series of monographs, the Harvard Studies in Business History. He also served as editor of the Bulletin of the Business Historical Society (1926–1953), a journal which later became the Business History Review (1954-date). N.S.B. Grass and Henrietta M. Larson, Casebook in American business history (1939) defined the field for a generation.

Business history in the U.S. took off in the 1960s with a high volume of products and innovative methodologies. Scholars worked to develop theoretical explanations of the growth of the business enterprise, the study of strategy and structure by Alfred Chandler being a prime example. The relationship between business and the federal government became a focal point of the study. On the whole, the 1960s affirmed the conclusions of the earlier decades regarding the close interrelationship between government and business enterprise.

=== Ranking entrepreneurs and management theorists ===
A 2002 survey of 58 business history professors gave the top spot in the history of American business entrepreneurs to Henry Ford, followed by Bill Gates; John D. Rockefeller; Andrew Carnegie, and Thomas Edison. Also included were Sam Walton; J. P. Morgan; Alfred P. Sloan; Walt Disney; Ray Kroc; Thomas J. Watson; Alexander Graham Bell; Eli Whitney; James J. Hill; Jack Welch; Cyrus McCormick; David Packard; Bill Hewlett; Cornelius Vanderbilt; and George Westinghouse.

A 1977 survey of management scholars reported the top five pioneers in management ideas were: Frederick Winslow Taylor; Chester Barnard; Frank Bunker Gilbreth; Elton Mayo; and Lillian Moller Gilbreth. An emphasis on expertise can be seen as defining an era of management work, shown in the works of Elton Mayo, Chester Barnard, Mary Parker Follett, Max Weber, Chris Argyris, and Peter Drucker. Drucker introduced the term "knowledge work" in 1959 and has been described as "the founder of modern management".

=== Chandler ===
After 1960 the most influential scholar was Alfred D. Chandler Jr. (1918-2007) at the Harvard Business School. In a career that spanned over sixty years, Chandler produced numerous groundbreaking monographs, articles, and reviews. Intensely focused on only a few areas of the discipline, Chandler nonetheless succeeded in establishing and developing an entirely new realm of business history.

Chandler's masterwork was The Visible Hand: The Managerial Revolution in American Business (1977). His first two chapters looked at traditional owner-operated small business operations in commerce and production, including the largest among them, the slave plantations in the South. Chapters 3-5 summarize the history of railroad management, with stress on innovations not just in technology but also in accounting, finance and statistics. He then turned to the new business operations made possible by the rail system in mass distribution, such as jobbers, department stores and mail order. A quick survey (ch 8) review mass innovation in mass production. The integration of mass distribution and mass production (ch 9-11) led to many mergers and the emergence of giant industrial corporations by 1900. Management for Chandler was much more than the CEO, it was the whole system of techniques and included middle management (ch 11) as well as the corporate structure of the biggest firms, Standard Oil, General Electric, US Steel, and DuPont (ch 13–14). Chandler argued that modern large-scale firms arose to take advantage of the national markets and productive techniques available after the rail network was in place. He found that they prospered because they had higher productivity, lower costs, and higher profits. The firms created the "managerial class" in America because they needed to coordinate the increasingly complex and interdependent system. This ability to achieve efficiency through coordination, not some anti-competitive monopolistic greed by robber barons, explained the high levels of concentration in modern American industry.

Chandler's work was somewhat ignored in history departments, but proved influential in business, economics, and sociology departments. In sociology, for example, prior to Chandler's research, sociologists assumed there were no differences between governmental, corporate, and nonprofit organizations. Chandler's focus on corporations clearly demonstrated that there were differences, and this thesis has guided organizational sociologists' work since the 1970s. It also motivated sociologists to investigate and critique Chandler's work more closely, turning up instances in which Chandler assumed American corporations acted for reasons of efficiency when they actually operated in a context of politics or conflict. Other historians, such as Gabriel Kolko, challenged the very notion of "efficiency through coordination", arguing instead that big business had, for reasons of inefficiency and a dislike of market discipline, openly sought government assistance to keep market forces at bay.

=== Other mechanisms ===
Lamoreaux et al. (2003) offers a new synthesis of American business history during the 19th-20th centuries. Moving beyond the markets-versus-hierarchies framework that underlies the previously dominant interpretation of Chandler, the authors highlight the great variety of coordination mechanisms in use in the economy at any given time. Drawing on late-20th-century theoretical work in economics, they show how the relative advantages and disadvantages of these different mechanisms have shifted in complex and often unpredictable ways as a result of changing economic circumstances. One advantage of this perspective is that it avoids the teleology that has characterized so much writing in the field. As a result, the authors can situate the "New Economy" of the late 20th century in broad historical context without succumbing to the temptation to view it as a climactic stage in the process of economic development. They thus provide a particularly persuasive example of the importance of business history to the understanding of national and international history.

A number of sources address the history of business management as it has developed as a profession. From Higher Aims to Hired Hands: The Social Transformation of American Business Schools and the Unfulfilled Promise of Management as a Profession (2007) by Rakesh Khurana traces the rise and development of American management as a profession and argues that its promise has been unfulfilled. A key event was the publication of the Gordon-Howell report, Higher Education for Business (1959), by economists Robert Aaron Gordon and James Edwin Howell. Funded by the Ford Foundation, the report gave detailed recommendations for treating management as a science and improving the academic quality of business schools. Another influential report, that same year, was The Education Of American Businessmen: A Study Of University-College Programs In Business Administration (1959) by Frank Cook Pierson. The next thirty years are sometimes referred to as a “Golden Age” in which quantitative social science research became an established part of business schools. By the 1990s, however, there was a gap between theory-oriented business school faculty and the more applied interests of students and business practitioners. In 1993, Donald C. Hambrick's presidential address to the Academy of Management (AoM). “What if the Academy Actually Mattered?”, drew attention to this relevance crisis. The theme has been repeatedly visited since then, including by president Anita M. McGahan in 2017. Another major focus of concern has been the replication crisis. Anne S. Tsui has suggested that business and management should not treat the issues of rigor (credibility of evidence) and relevance (usefulness of knowledge) separately, but see them as related.

=== Comparative ===
Understanding the development of business history as a discipline meriting its own aims, theories and methods is often understood as a transition from dominating themes of 'company biography', toward more analytical 'comparative' approaches. This 'comparative' trend enabled practitioners to underline their work with 'generalist' potential. Questions of comparative business performance have become a staple, featuring into the wider economic histories of nations, regions, and communities. For many, this transition was first achieved by Alfred D. Chandler. Chandler's successors as Isidor Straus Professor of Business History at Harvard Business School continued to emphasize the importance of comparative research and course development. In 1995 Thomas K. McCraw published Creating Modern Capitalism (Cambridge, MA 1995) This book compared the business histories of Britain, Germany, Japan, and the United States since the Industrial Revolution, and was used as the text of a new year MBA course at Harvard Business School. Geoffrey Jones, who was McCraw's successor as Isidor Straus Professor of Business History, also pursued a comparative research agenda. He published a comparative study of the history of globalization called Multinationals and Global Capitalism (Oxford, 2005). In 2010, Jones also published a comparative history of the global beauty industry entitled Beauty Imagined: A History of the Global Beauty Industry (Oxford, 2010). More recently, Jones and the Business History Initiative at the Harvard Business School has sought to facilitate research and teaching on African, Asian and Latin American business history in a project called Creating Emerging Markets, which includes interviews with long-time leaders of firms and NGOs in those regions.

A trend in recent years has been to compare the business histories of individual countries. Geoffrey Jones (academic) and Andrea Lluch have published a comparative study of the historical impact of globalization on Argentina and Chile. In 2011 Jones and his co-editor Walter A. Friedman published an editorial in Business History Review which identified comparative research as essential for the future of business history as a discipline. Anne S. Tsui has studied business in both the United States and China and encourages scholars to collaborate internationally and to study leadership as it is practiced in China.

== France ==
American historians working in French business history led by Rondo Cameron argued that most of the business enterprises in France were family-owned, small in scale, and managed conservatively. By contrast, French business historians emphasized the success of national economic planning since the end of World War II. They argued that the economic development in this period stemmed from various phenomena of the late 19th century: the corporation system, the joint-stock deposit and investment banks, and the technological innovations in the steel industry. To clarify the contributions of 19th-century entrepreneurs to the economic development in France, French scholars support two journals, Enterprises et Histoire and Revue d'Histoire de la Siderurgie.

== Japan ==
Japanese business history developed as an autonomous field in the 1960s, strongly influenced by Alfred D. Chandler Jr. and the Harvard Business School. Earlier studies on entrepreneurs and firms had appeared within economic and social history, but the Harvard model—emphasizing the firm as an analytical unit—helped define a new discipline. Keiichiro Nakagawa, trained at the University of Tokyo, was among the first to bring the approach to Japan after his stay at Harvard. The Business History Society of Japan (BHSJ) was founded in 1964, launching its journal Keieishigaku (Japan Business History Review) in 1965.

Through the Fuji Conferences (1974–1999), supported by the Taniguchi Foundation, the BHSJ hosted leading international scholars such as Alfred D. Chandler Jr., Jürgen Kocka, Douglass North, Leslie Hannah, and Geoffrey Jones. These meetings and publications, including the English-language Japanese Yearbook in Business History (1985–2004), placed Japanese scholars in global debates during the 1980s–1990s “golden age” of the field.

Since the mid-2000s, however, Japanese business history has diverged from international trends. While the field worldwide has moved toward interdisciplinary dialogue with management studies, sociology, and environmental or gender history, research in Japan has largely remained Chandlerian, focusing on single-firm case studies and descriptive accounts. Between 1991 and 2020, nearly half of Keieishigaku articles examined one company, and more than half cited no English-language references.

Membership in the BHSJ peaked at about 850 in 2010 but has since declined to under 700. The authors note that limited incentives for publishing internationally and shrinking enrollments in the social sciences have reinforced isolation. Nonetheless, a new generation of Japanese scholars—some trained abroad—are introducing narrative, comparative, and socially engaged approaches, including research on labor, gender, and innovation. Kyoto University’s English-language graduate program in Economic and Business History (est. 2018) represents renewed efforts to reconnect Japanese business history to global research networks.

== Latin America ==
Barbero (2008) examines the development of the field of Latin American business history, from the 1960s to 2007. Latin American business history developed in the 1960s, but until the 1980s it was dominated by either highly politicized debates over Latin American underdevelopment or biographies of Latin American entrepreneurs. Since the 1980s, Latin American business history has become a much more professionalized and an integrated part of Latin American academia. It is much less politicized and has moved beyond entrepreneurial biography to histories of companies and industries. However, Latin American business historians have still not devoted enough attention to agricultural enterprises or comparative histories between the many countries. Probably most importantly, Latin American business historians have to become much more versed in business history theory and methodology so as to get beyond mere summation of the region's economic past.

In the 1980s, numerous governments in Latin America adopted neoliberal policies. In Mexico, for example, under presidents Carlos Salinas de Gortari (1988–94) and Ernesto Zedillo neoliberalism became the basis for state-private sector relationships. The new policy allowed for close cooperation with United States and Canada as exemplified by the North American Free Trade Agreement (NAFTA) solidified a strategic alliance between the state and business. In Brazil The key policy was privatization of nationalized industries especially steel through the 'Programa Nacional de Desestatizção' (National Program of Destatization) during the early 1990s. It aimed to implement a new industrial policy by restructuring the industry and reforming labor-business relations.

The Common Market of the South, or Mercosur, is a South American commerce pact started in 1991 among Argentina, Brazil, Paraguay, and Uruguay at the instigation of Argentina and Brazil. Mercosur's purpose is to promote free trade and the fluid movement of goods, people, and currency. Since its foundation, Mercosur's functions have been updated and amended many times; it currently confines itself to a customs union, in which there is free intra-zone trade and common trade policy between member countries.

== Britain ==
Business history in Britain emerged in the 1950s following the publication of a series of influential company histories and the establishment of the journal Business History in 1958 at the University of Liverpool. The most influential of these early company histories was Charles Wilson’s History of Unilever, the first volume of which was published in 1954. Other examples included Coleman's work on Courtaulds and artificial fibers, Alford on Wills and the tobacco industry, Barker on Pilkington's and glass manufacture. These early studies were conducted primarily by economic historians interested in the role of leading firms in the development of the wider industry and therefore went beyond mere corporate histories. Although some work examined the successful industries of the industrial revolution and the role of the key entrepreneurs, in the 1970s scholarly debate in British business history became increasingly focused on the economic decline. For economic historians, the loss of British competitive advantage after 1870 could at least in part be explained by entrepreneurial failure, prompting further business history research into the individual industry and corporate cases. The Lancashire cotton textile industry, which had been the leading take-off sector in the industrial revolution, but which was slow to invest in subsequent technical developments, became an important topic of debate on this subject. William Lazonick for example argued that cotton textile entrepreneurs in Britain failed to develop larger integrated plants on the American model; a conclusion similar to Chandler's synthesis of a number of comparative case studies.

Studies of British business leaders have emphasized how they fit into the class structure, especially their relationship to the aristocracy, and the desire to use their wealth to purchase landed estates, and hereditary titles. Biography has been of less importance in British business history, but there are compilations. British business history began to widen its scope in the 1980s, with research work conducted at the LSE's Business History Unit, led first by Leslie Hannah, then by Terry Gourvish. Other research centres followed, notably at Glasgow and Reading, reflecting an increasing involvement in the discipline by Business and Management School academics. More recent editors of Business History, Geoffrey Jones (academic) (Harvard Business School), Charles Harvey (University of Newcastle Business School), John Wilson (Liverpool University Management School) and Steven Toms (Leeds University Business School) have promoted management strategy themes such as networks, family capitalism, corporate governance, human resource management, marketing and brands, and multi-national organisations in their international as well as merely British context. Employing these new themes has allowed business historians to challenge and adapt the earlier conclusions of Chandler and others about the performance of the British economy. As one of the leading journals in the field, it publishes on a wide range of topics, and its content is increasingly internationally focused under the more recent leaderships of editors-in-chief Ray Stokes (University of Glasgow), Neil Rollings (University of Glasgow), Stephanie Decker (University of Birmingham), and the current joint editors-in-chief, Christina Lubinski (Copenhagen Business School) and Niall MacKenzie (University of Strathclyde).

== Africa ==
There is a growing body of work of business history in Africa. In one of the recent works Ebimo Amungo chronicled the birth, growth and contributions of indigenous African multinationals to the economic development of Africa with his book "The Rise of the African Multinational Enterprise".

== Academic associations ==
A number of learned societies and networks coordinate conferences, journals, and research training in business history:

- Business History Conference (BHC) – U.S.-based scholarly association founded in 1954; organizes an annual meeting and supports the journal Enterprise & Society."Mission & History". Business History Conference.
- European Business History Association (EBHA) – pan-European body established in 1994; hosts annual congresses and a doctoral summer school."About EBHA". European Business History Association."European Business History Association". Wikipedia.
- Association of Business Historians (ABH) – UK learned society promoting research and teaching in business history; co-organizes conferences and prizes."Association of Business Historians". Association of Business Historians."Association of Business Historians". Wikipedia.
- Business History Society of Japan (BHSJ) – national association founded in 1964; publishes Japan Business History Review / Japanese Research in Business History (JRBH) and holds an annual congress."Business History Society of Japan (English)". Business History Society of Japan."Japanese Research in Business History (JRBH)". J-STAGE.
- World Congress of Business History – a periodic global meeting developed by an international initiative under EBHA/BHC leadership."Mission Statement of the Initiative Group". World Congress of Business History.

== Bibliography ==
=== Textbooks and surveys: USA ===
- Blackford, Mansel G. A History of Small Business in America ISBN 0-8057-9824-2) (1992)
- Blackford, Mansel G., and K. Austin Kerr. Business Enterprise in American History (ISBN 0395351553) (1990)
- Blaszczyk, Regina Lee, and Philip B. Scranton, eds. Major Problems in American Business History: Documents and Essays (2006) 521 pp.
- Bryant, Keith L. A History of American Business (1983) (ISBN 0133892476)
- Chamberlain, John. Enterprising Americans: A Business History of the United States (ISBN 0060107022) (1974) by popular journalist
- Chandler, Jr., Alfred D. The Visible Hand: The Managerial Revolution in American Business (1977), highly influential study
- Chandler, Jr., Alfred D. Strategy and Structure: Chapters in the History of the Industrial Enterprise (1962)
- Chandler, Jr., Alfred D. Scale and Scope: The Dynamics of Industrial Capitalism (1990).
- Chandler, Jr., Alfred D. "The Competitive Performance of U.S. Industrial Enterprises since the Second World War," Business History Review 68 (Spring 1994): 1–72.
- Chandler, Alfred D., Jr. and James W. Cortada. A Nation Transformed by Information: How Information Has Shaped the United States from Colonial Times to the Present (2000)
- Cochran, Thomas Childs. Business in American Life: A History (1976)
- Dibacco, Thomas V. Made in the U.S.A.: The History of American Business (1988) (ISBN 0060914661)
- Friedman, Walter A. and Tedlow, Richard S. "Statistical Portraits of American Business Elites: a Review Essay." Business History 2003 45(4): 89–113. ISSN 0007-6791
- Groner, Alex. The American heritage history of American business & industry, (ISBN 0070011567) (1972), very well illustrated
- Krooss, Herman Edward. American Business History (ISBN 0130240834) (1972)
- Lamoreaux, Naomi R.; Raff, Daniel M. G.; and Temin, Peter. "Beyond Markets and Hierarchies: Toward a New Synthesis of American Business History." American Historical Review 2003 108(2): 404–433. online
- Lamoreaux, Naomi R., and Daniel M. G. Raff, eds. Coordination and Information: Historical Perspectives on the Organization of Enterprise (1995)
- McCraw, Thomas K., and William R. Childs. American Business Since 1920: How It Worked (3rd ed. 2018) excerpt
- Porter, Glenn. The rise of big business, 1860–1920 (3rd ed. 2005)
- Schweikart, Larry. The Entrepreneurial Adventure: A History of Business in the United States (2000)
- Serwer, Andy, et al. American Enterprise: A History of Business in America (2015) excerpt
- Temin, Peter, ed. Inside the Business Enterprise: Historical Perspectives on the Transformation and Use of Information (1992)
- Walker, Juliet E. K. Encyclopedia of African American Business History Greenwood Press, 1999
- Waterhouse, Benjamin C. The Land of Enterprise: A Business History of the United States (Simon & Schuster, 2017). 280 pp
- Whitten, David O. The Emergence of Giant Enterprise, 1860–1914: American Commercial Enterprise and Extractive Industries (1983)

=== Textbooks and surveys: World ===
- Amatori, Franco and Geoffrey Jones, eds. Business History around the World at the Turn of the Twenty-First Century (2003) pp 192–214; historiography
- Berghahn, Volker R. Quest for Economic Empire: European Strategies of German Big Business in the Twentieth Century 1996
- Blackford Mansel G. The Rise of Modern Business in Great Britain, the United States, and Japan (1998)
- Cassis, Youssef. Big Business: The European Experience in the Twentieth Century (Oxford UP, 1999)
- Cassis, Youssef, François Crouzet, and Terry Gourvish, eds. Management and Business in Britain and France: The Age of the Corporate Economy (1995).
- Chandler, Alfred D., Jr. Shaping the Industrial Century: The Remarkable Story of the Evolution of the Modern Chemical and Pharmaceutical Industries. (Harvard Studies in Business History, no. 46.) 2005.
- Chandler, Alfred D., Jr. Scale and Scope: The Dynamics of Industrial Capitalism (1990)
- Chapman, Stanley. Merchant Enterprise In Britain (2003)
- Church, Roy, and Andrew Godley. The Emergence of Modern Marketing (2003)
- Dávila, Carlos, Rory Miller, and Garry Mills. Business History in Latin America: The Experience of Seven Countries Liverpool University Press, 1999 * Gardella, Robert, Jane K. Leonard, Andrea McElderry; Chinese Business History: Interpretive Trends and Priorities for the Future M. E. Sharpe, 1998
- Goodall, F., Gourvish, T. and Tolliday, S. (eds.). International bibliography of business history. London and New York: Routledge, 1997. link.
- Hunt, Edwin S.. and James M. Murray. A History of Business in Medieval Europe, 1200-1550 1999
- Jones, Geoffrey. The Evolution of International Business: An Introduction (1996)
- Jones, Geoffrey. Multinationals and Global Capitalism. From the Nineteenth to the Twenty-First Century(2005)
- Jones, Geoffrey., and Jonathan Zeitlin (eds.) The Oxford Handbook of Business History(2008)
- Jones, Geoffrey. Beauty Imagined. A History of the Global Beauty Industry(2010)
- Jones, Geoffrey. Entrepreneurship and Multinationals. Global Business and the Making of the Modern World(2013)
- Jones, Geoffrey. Profits and Sustainability. A History of Green Entrepreneurship(2017)
- Kirby, Maurice W. Business Enterprise in Modern Britain: From the Eighteenth to the Twentieth Century (1994)
- Klassen, Henry Cornelius. Business History of Alberta (1999), on Canada
- Kuisel, Richard F. Capitalism and the State in Modern France: Renovation and Economic Management in the Twentieth Century (1981).
- Lamoreaux, Naomi R., Daniel Raff, and Peter Temin, eds. Learning by Doing in Organizations, Markets, and Nations (1999).
- Landes, David S. Joel Mokyr and William J. Baumol, eds. The Invention of Enterprise: Entrepreneurship from Ancient Mesopotamia to Modern Times (2010) 566 pp. ISBN 978-0-691-14370-5
- Landes, David S. "French Entrepreneurship and Industrial Growth in the Nineteenth Century," Journal of Economic History (1949) 9#1 pp. 45–61 in JSTOR
- Magnuson, William. For Profit: A History of Corporations (2022) excerpt
- Mathias, Peter, and M. M. Postan, eds. Cambridge Economic History of Europe. Vol. 7: Industrial Economies. Capital, Labour, and Enterprise. Part 1 Britain, France, Germany and Scandinavia (1978) pp 231–81.
- Millward, Robert. The State and Business in the Major Powers: An Economic History 1815-1939 (2013)
- Mokyr, Joel. ed. The Oxford Encyclopedia of Economic History 4 vol (2003)
- Moss, Michael, and Philippe Jobert, eds. The Birth and Death of Companies: An Historical Perspective (1990), on Europe
- Pohl, Manfred, and Sabine Freitag, eds. Handbook on the history of European banks (1994) online
- Sabel, Charles F., and Jonathan Zeitlin, eds. World of Possibilities: Flexibility and Mass Production in Western Industrialization, (1997)
- Sluyterman, Keetie E. Dutch Enterprise in the Twentieth Century: Business Strategies in a Small Open Economy (2005)
- Teich, Mikuláš and Roy Porter, eds. The Industrial Revolution in National Context: Europe and the USA (1996) 445pp; 127 scholarly essays on every major country. excerpt
- Tignor, Robert L. "The Business Firm in Africa." Business History Review 2007 81(1): 87-110.
- Wilson, John F. British Business History, 1720-1994 (1995)

=== Historiography ===
- Amatori, Franco, and Geoffrey Jones, eds. Business History Around the World (2003)
- Barbero, María Inés. "Business History in Latin America: A Historiographical Perspective," Business History Review, Autumn 2008, Vol. 82 Issue 3, pp 555–575
- Cheta, Omar Youssef. "The economy by other means: The historiography of capitalism in the modern Middle East." History Compass (April 2018) 16#4 DOI: 10.1111/hic3.12444
- Decker, Stephanie, Matthias Kipping, and R. Daniel Wadhwani. "New business histories! Plurality in business history research methods." Business History (2015) 57#1 pp: 30–40. online
- Decker, Stephanie. "The silence of the archives: business history, post-colonialism and archival ethnography." Management & Organizational History 8.2 (2013): 155–173. online
- Engel, Von Alexander. "Die Transformation von Märkten und die Entstehung moderner Unternehmen," [The Transformation of Markets and the Emergence of Modern Enterprises] Jahrbuch fuer Wirtschaftsgeschichte (2012), Issue 2, pp 93–111
- Fischer, Wolfram. "Some Recent Developments of Business History in Germany, Austria, and Switzerland." Business History Review (1963): 416–436. online
- Friedman, Walter A., and Geoffrey Jones. "Time for Debate,"Business History Review, (Autumn 2011) 85#1 pp:1-8.
- Friedman, Walter A., and Geoffrey Jones, eds. Business History (2014) 720pp; reprint of scholarly articles published 1934 to 2012
- Galambos, Louis. American Business History. Service Center for Teachers of History. 1967, historiographical pamphlet.
- Grafe, Regina, and Oscar Gelderblom. "The Rise and Fall of the Merchant Guilds: Re-thinking the Comparative Study of Commercial Institutions in Premodern Europe," Journal of Interdisciplinary History, (2010) 40#4 pp 477–511. online; Comparative study of the origins and development of merchant guilds in Europe, esp. their emergence during the late Middle Ages and their decline in the Early Modern era
- Gras, N.S.B. and Henrietta M. Larson. Casebook in American Business History (1939), with short biographies, company histories and outlines of the main issues
- Gras, N. S. B. "Are You Writing a Business History?" Bulletin of the Business Historical Society 1944 18(4): 73-110. detailed guide to writing one; in JSTOR
- Hansen, Per H., “Business History: A Cultural and Narrative Approach,” Business History Review, 86 (Winter 2012), 693–717. online
- Harvey, Charles. Business History: concepts and measurement (1989)
- Harvey, Charles, and John Turner. Labour and Business in Modern Britain 1989
- Hashino, Tomoko, and Osamu Saito. "Tradition and interaction: research trends in modern Japanese industrial history," Australian Economic History Review, Nov 2004, Vol. 44 Issue 3, pp 241–258
- Honeyman, Katrina. "Doing Business with Gender: Service Industries and British Business History." Business History Review 2007 81(3): 471–493.
- John, Richard R. "Elaborations, Revisions, Dissents: Alfred D. Chander, Jr.'s, The Visible Hand after Twenty Years," Business History Review 71 (Summer 1997): 151–200. online
- John, Richard R. "Business historians and the challenge of innovation." Business History Review 85.1 (2011): 185–201. online
- Johnman, Lewis and Murphy, Hugh. "Maritime and Business History in Britain: Past, Present, and Future?" International Journal of Maritime History 2007 19(1): 239–270. ISSN 0843-8714
- Kirkland, Edward C. "The Robber Barons Revisited," The American Historical Review, Vol. 66, No. 1. (Oct., 1960), pp. 68–73. in JSTOR
- Klass, Lance, and Susan Kinnell. Corporate America: A Historical Bibliography 1984
- Klein, Maury. "Coming Full Circle: the Study of Big Business since 1950." Enterprise & Society: the International Journal of Business History 2001 2(3): 425–460. ISSN 1467-2227 Fulltext: OUP
- Laird, Pamela Walker. "How business historians can save the world–from the fallacy of self-made success." Business History 59.8 (2017): 1201–1217.
- Larson, Henrietta M. "Business History: Retrospect and Prospect." Bulletin of the Business Historical Society 1947 21(6): 173–199. in Jstor
- McCarthy, Dennis M. International Business History: A Contextual and Case Approach (1994)
- McElderry, Andrea Lee, Jane Kate Leonard, and Robert Gardella. Chinese Business History: Interpretive Trends and Priorities for the Future (1998)
- Mordhorst, Mads, and Stefan Schwarzkopf. "Theorising narrative in business history." Business History 59.8 (2017): 1155–1175. online
- Perchard, Andrew, et al. "Clio in the business school: Historical approaches in strategy, international business, and entrepreneurship." Business History 59.6 (2017): 904-927 online.
- Perks, Rob. "The roots of oral history: exploring contrasting attitudes to elite, corporate, and business oral history in Britain and the US." Oral History Review 37.2 (2010): 215–224. online
- Rollings, Neil. "British Business History: a Review of the Periodical Literature for 2005." Business History 2007 49(3): 271–292. ISSN 0007-6791
- Scranton, Philip, and Patrick Fridenson. Reimagining Business History (2013) online review
- Supple, Barry Emmanuel. Essays in British Business History (1977)
- Toms, Steven and Wilson, John F. "Scale, Scope and Accountability: Towards a New Paradigm of British Business History." Business History 2003 45(4): 1-23. ISSN 0007-6791
- Tucker, Kenneth Arthur. Business History: Selected Readings (1977)

=== Special studies: world ===
- Bowen, H. V. Business of Empire: The East India Company and Imperial Britain, 1756-1833 (2006), 304pp

=== Special studies: U.S. ===
- Bailyn, Bernard. The New England Merchants in the Seventeenth Century (1955).
- Bursk, Edward C., et al. eds. The World Of Business Harvard Business School (4 vol. 1962); 2,700 pages of business insight, memoirs, history, fiction, & analysis
- Cochran, Thomas C. The Pabst Brewing Company: The History of an American Business (1948)
- Cole, Arthur H. The American Wool Manufacture 2 vol (1926)
- Dicke, Thomas S. Franchising in America: The Development of a Business Method, 1840-1980 (1992)
- Doerflinger, Thomas M. A Vigorous Spirit of Enterprise: Merchants and Economic Development in Revolutionary Philadelphia (1986)
- Friedman, Walter A. Birth of a Salesman. The Transformation of Selling in America(2005)
- Friedman, Walter A. Fortune Tellers. The Story of America's First Economic Forecasters(2013)
- Pak, Susie J. Gentlemen Bankers. The World of J.P. Morgan (2013)
- Scranton, Philip. Proprietary Capitalism: The Textile Manufacture at Philadelphia, 1800–1885 (1983)
- Scranton, Philip. Figured Tapestry: Production, Markets, and Power in Philadelphia Textiles, 1885–1941 (1989).
- Tucker, Barbara M. Samuel Slater and the Origins of the American Textile Industry, 1790–1860 (1984)
- Weare, Walter B. Black Business in the New South: A Social History of the North Carolina Mutual Life Insurance Company (1993)
- Wilkins, Mira. The Emergence of Multinational Enterprise(1970)
- Wilkins, Mira. The Maturing of Multinational Enterprise (1974)
- Wilkins, Mira. The History of Foreign Investment in the United States before 1914(1989)
- Wilkins, Mira. The History of Foreign Investment in the United States 1914-1945(2004)
- Williamson, Harold F. and Arnold R. Daum. The American Petroleum Industry: The Age of Illumination, 1859-1899, (1959); vol 2, American Petroleum Industry: the Age of Energy 1899-1959, 1964. The standard history of the oil industry.
