= Andrew Godley =

British academic

Andrew Christopher Godley

Academic background
- Education: London School of Economics and Political Science

Academic work
- Discipline: Business History; Entrepreneurship; Economic History
- Institutions: University of Reading; Zhejiang University
- Awards: 1994 Gerschenkron Prize and 2017 AACSB Entrepreneurship Spotlight Challenge
- Website: Information at IDEAS / RePEc

Andrew Godley is a British economist, and a Professor of Entrepreneurship and Innovation at University of Sussex Business School. He served as a Professor of Management and Business History at the Henley Business School at University of Reading, where he has been a Pro Dean of Resources and Partnerships. He is remains a visiting professor at Zhejiang University and Wharton School and Center for Advanced Jewish Studies, University of Pennsylvania.

== Life and career ==
Godley received his BSc at London School of Economics and Political Science in 1986, and his doctorate in 1993 from the London School of Economics and Political Science. He joined Department of Economics at University of Reading in October 1991.. He has worked in European University Institute, Nuffield College at University of Oxford, Wake Forest University in the United States.

Godley is a professor of management of business history at the University of Reading's Henley Business School. He also serves there as the Pro Dean of Resources and Partnerships. He is a visiting professor at the Zhejiang University, Wharton School and Center for Advanced Jewish Studies, University of Pennsylvania.

He is co-founder of Henley Centre for Entrepreneurship, which was recognised as one of the top 20 Centres for Entrepreneurship in the world by the AACSB in 2017. H .

== Research ==
Godley's research focuses on the links between entrepreneurship, business history, innovation, entrepreneurial ecosystems. He has published over 100 articles in peer-reviewed journals including Economic History Review, Business History Review, Strategic Entrepreneurship Journal and Journal of Management Studies. His research has been awarded grants from the ESRC, the Leverhulme Trust and British Academy. He has served as an Editorial Board member of Business History Review and Associate Editor of Scandinavian Economic History Review. He is in the top 20 of the world’s most cited scholars in Business History Review.

== Awards and contributions ==
- AMBA Silk Road Entrepreneurship Education initiative (since 2016),
- World Business History Conference – Inaugural Academic Committee member (2013)
- Reading Business Group jointly with Prof Mark Casson
- Memorial Foundation for Jewish Culture Fellowship (1995), New York City, USA.
- Gerschenkron Prize (1994)
- AACSB – Entrepreneurship Spotlight Challenge (2017), AACSB

== Books ==
- The Emergence of Modern Marketing, ed. with R. Church, London: Cass, 2003.
- Jewish Immigrant Entrepreneurship in London and New York: Enterprise and Culture Basingstoke and New York: Palgrave, 2001.
- Cultural Factors in Economic Growth, ed. with M.C. Casson, Berlin, Heidelberg, and New York: Springer-Verlag, 2000.
- Business History and Business Culture, ed. with O. Westall, Manchester: Manchester University Press, 1996. North American edition, New York: St Martins Press, 1997.
- Banks, Networks and Small Firm Finance, ed. with D. Ross, London: Frank Cass, 1996.
