= Gerald F. Davis =

American sociologist (born 1961)

- Born: 1961 (age 64–65)
- Education: University of Michigan; Stanford Graduate School of Business in 1990.
- Occupation: Business sociologist
- Employer: University of Michigan
- Website: sites.google.com/a/umich.edu/jerrydavis/home

Gerald Fredrick (Jerry) Davis (born 1961) is an American sociologist and the Gilbert and Ruth Whitaker Professor of Business Administration at the University of Michigan, known for his work on corporate networks, social movements and organization theory.

== Life and work ==
Davis obtained his AB in philosophy and psychology at the University of Michigan in 1984, his MA in sociology from Stanford University, and his PhD in Organizational Behavior at the Stanford Graduate School of Business in 1990.

After graduation, Davis started his academic career at Northwestern University's Kellogg Graduate School of Management as assistant professor in 1990, and got promoted to associate professor. In 1994, he returned to the Stanford University Graduate School of Business as an associate professor, and was subsequently promoted to a full professor. In the year 1997–98, he served as a research fellow at the Center for Advanced Study in the Behavioral Sciences in Stanford, California. Since 2001, Davis has held the position of professor of sociology at the Ross School of Business at the University of Michigan, where he was also the professor of management and organizations from 2002 to 2004.

Davis described his research interests as "broadly concerned with the effects of finance on society". Recent writings examine how ideas about corporate social responsibility have evolved to meet changes in the structures and geographic footprint of multinational corporations; whether "shareholder capitalism" is still a viable model for economic development; how income inequality in an economy is related to corporate size and structure; why theories about organizations do (or do not) progress; how architecture shapes social networks and innovation in organizations; why stock markets spread to some countries and not others; and whether there exist viable organizational alternatives to shareholder-owned corporations in the United States."

Davis is a co-founder with Anne S. Tsui of Responsible Research in Business and Management, a global network of researchers that encourages business research to be more credible and useful to society.

== Selected publications ==
- Davis, Gerald Fredrick, ed. Social movements and organization theory. Cambridge Univ Pr, 2005.
- Scott, W. Richard, and Gerald F. Davis. Organizations and organizing: Rational Natural and Open System Perspectives, (2006) (sixth edition).

Articles (selection)

- Davis, Gerald F., and Tracy A. Thompson. "A social movement perspective on corporate control." Administrative science quarterly (1994): 141–173.
- Davis, Gerald F. "Agents without principles? The spread of the poison pill through the intercorporate network." Administrative science quarterly (1991): 583–613.
- Davis, Gerald F., Kristina A. Diekmann, and Catherine H. Tinsley. "The decline and fall of the conglomerate firm in the 1980s: The deinstitutionalization of an organizational form." American Sociological Review (1994): 547–570.
- Davis, Gerald F., and Henrich R. Greve. "Corporate elite networks and governance changes in the 1980s." American journal of sociology 103.1 (1997): 1-37.
- Davis, Gerald F., Mina Yoo, and Wayne E. Baker. "The small world of the American corporate elite, 1982–2001." Strategic organization 1.3 (2003): 301–326.
