= Alfred Francis Pribram =

Alfred Francis Pribram (1859–1942) was a British historian of Austrian descent.

== Life ==
He was born on 1 September 1859 in London, England, the son of Heinrich Pribram and Sophie Pribram. He died on 7 May 1942 in London. Pribram was of Jewish descent. After the Anschluss in 1938, his teaching license was revoked due to his Jewish origin.

== Career ==
Pribram contributed several biographies to the Encyclopedia Britannica. He was professor of history at the University of Vienna from 1894 to 1930. From 1929 onwards, he was responsible for the Austrian part of the International scientific committee on price history.

Pribram wrote several books on history and foreign affairs.
