= N. S. B. Gras =

- Gras, c. 1941
- Born: Norman Scott Brien Gras; 1884; Toronto, Ontario, Canada
- Died: October 9, 1956 (aged 71–72)

Academic background
- Education: University of Western Ontario; Harvard University
- Thesis: The Evolution of the English Corn Market, 1100–1700 (1912)
- Doctoral advisor: Edwin F. Gay

Academic work
- Discipline: History
- Sub-discipline: Business history
- Institutions: Clark University; University of Minnesota; Harvard University
- Notable ideas: Business history

Norman Scott Brien Gras (1884–1956), known as N. S. B. Gras, was a Canadian professor at the Harvard Business School who invented the academic discipline of business history.

== Early life ==
Gras was born in 1884 in Toronto, Ontario. He graduated from the University of Western Ontario. He went on to receive a PhD in economics from Harvard University.

== Career ==
Gras taught economics at the University of Minnesota.

Gras was appointed as Professor of Business History by Dean Wallace Brett Donham in 1927. He invented this new academic discipline, which only existed as his job title at the time. From the outset, Gras made sure to draw a distinction between economic history and business history. For Gras, economic history failed to focus on the role of the businessman as well as the role of business administration. Instead, the main goal of business history was to highlight those two components in the history of corporations and business developments.

Gras served as the president of the Business History Foundation. He was the founder and editor of the Journal of Economic and Business History. He was also the editor of the Harvard Studies of Business History.

== Works ==
- Gras, N. S. B. (1918). The Early English Customs System: A Documentary Study of the Institutional and Economic History of the Customs from the Thirteenth to the Sixteenth Century. Cambridge, Massachusetts: Harvard University Press. OCLC 3077330.
- Gras, N. S. B. (1922). An Introduction to Economic History. New York: Harper & Bros. OCLC 4625645.
- Gras, N. S. B. (1925). A History of Agriculture in Europe and America. New York: F.S. Crofts & Co. OCLC 2138695.
- Gras, N. S. B. (1930). Industrial Evolution. Cambridge, Massachusetts: Harvard University Press. OCLC 1187223.
- Gras, N. S. B.; Pforzheimer, Carl H. (1937). The Massachusetts First National Bank of Boston, 1784-1934. Cambridge, Massachusetts: Harvard University Press. OCLC 2490681.
- Gras, N. S. B.; Larson, Henrietta M. (1939). Casebook in American History. New York: F.S. Crofts & Co. OCLC 4139275.
- Gras, N. S. B. (1939). Business and Capitalism: An Introduction to Business History. New York: F.S. Crofts & Co. OCLC 2167414.
