= John Habakkuk =

British economic historian (1915–2002)

Sir John Habakkuk FBA FRHistS
- Born: 13 May 1915; Barry, Vale of Glamorgan, Wales
- Died: November 3, 2002 (aged 87); Chew Stoke, Somerset, England
- Occupations: Historian, academic and university administrator
- Title: Chichele Professor of Economic History
- Spouse: Mary Richards
- Children: 4

Academic background
- Education: St John's College, Cambridge
- Doctoral advisor: John Clapham

Academic work
- Institutions: Pembroke College, Cambridge; All Souls College, Oxford; Jesus College, Oxford; University College of Swansea
- Notable students: Ian Byatt; Roderick Floud; Patrick K. O'Brien

Sir Hrothgar John Habakkuk (13 May 1915 – 3 November 2002) was a British economic historian. Within the University of Oxford, he served as Chichele Professor of Economic History at All Souls College (1950–67), Principal of Jesus College (1967–84) and Vice-Chancellor of the University (1973–77). He was also President of the University College of Swansea (1975–84).

== Biography ==
Habakkuk was born in Barry, Vale of Glamorgan, Wales, the son of Evan and Anne Habakkuk. He was named "Hrothgar" after Hroðgar in Beowulf, which his father was reading at the time of his birth. However, he came to be known as John when he started to travel to the United States, and when he was knighted he found it easier to call himself "Sir John" than "Sir Hrothgar". His surname was assumed by a seventeenth-century forebear after the prophet Habakkuk, it being a Welsh custom at that time to take patronymics from the Bible.

He was educated at Barry County School and St John's College, Cambridge (scholar and Strathcona Student, starred first class degree in History 1936). (He was not, as sometimes erroneously stated, connected with Jesus College, Cambridge.) He began to study for a PhD under John Clapham, but his progress was interrupted by the Second World War. In 1938, he was elected a Fellow of Pembroke College, Cambridge, a position he held until 1950. He worked at Bletchley Park 1940–42 and the Board of Trade 1942–46, during which period he still found time to carry out research at the Public Record Office and in the archives of country houses. After World War II, he was from 1946 until 1950 Director of Studies and Librarian of the college and Lecturer in the Faculty of Economics. In 1973, Pembroke College elected him to an Honorary Fellowship. From 1950 until 1960, he was editor, with Michael Postan, of The Economic History Review.

In 1950, he moved to Oxford, where he would remain for the rest of his life. At the age of just thirty-five he had been appointed Chichele Professor of Economic History in the University of Oxford and Professorial Fellow of All Souls College. He held this appointment until 1967, when he became Principal of Jesus College. He also served as Vice-Chancellor of Oxford University (1973–77) and Pro-Vice-Chancellor (1977–84). He retired in 1984 and was Ford Lecturer in the following year. All Souls re-elected him to a fellowship in 1988. He was also President of University College, Swansea from 1975 until 1984 and an honorary fellow of the college from 1991. He was visiting professor at Harvard University 1954/5 and at University of California, Berkeley (Ford Research Professor) 1962/3.

Habakkuk was elected a Fellow of the British Academy in 1965 and a member of the American Philosophical Society in 1966. He was appointed Knight Bachelor in 1976. In the same year he began a four-year term as President of the Royal Historical Society. He was awarded the degree of Doctor of Letters honoris causa by the Universities of Wales (1971), Cambridge (1973), Pennsylvania (1975), Kent (1978), and Ulster (1988).

He was a member of the Advisory Council on Public Records 1958–70, the Social Science Research Council 1967–71, the National Libraries Committee 1968–69, the Administrative Board of the International Association of Universities 1975–84, and the Royal Commission on Historical Manuscripts 1978–90. He was Chairman of the Committee of Vice Chancellors and Principals of the Universities of the United Kingdom 1976–77, the Advisory Group on London Health Services 1980–81, and the Oxfordshire District Health Authority 1981–84. He was president of the Royal Historical Society (1977–1981),

Habakkuk married Mary Richards (died 2002), whom he met during the war and who later studied history at Cambridge, in 1948. They had a son and three daughters. He died, from renal failure and myelodysplasia, at the house of one of his daughters, Little Orchard, Scot Lane, Chew Stoke, in Somerset, England, on 3 November 2002.

== Publications ==
- John Habakkuk, Marriage, debt, and the estates system: English landownership 1650–1950 (Oxford: Clarendon Press, 1994) ISBN 9780198203988
- John Habakkuk, Population growth and economic development since 1750 (Leicester: Leicester University Press, 1971).
- John Habakkuk, Industrial organisation since the Industrial Revolution (Southampton: University of Southampton, 1968).
- John Habakkuk, American and British technology in the nineteenth century: the search for labour-saving inventions (Cambridge University Press, 1962).
- John Habakkuk et al., Lectures on economic development=Études sur le développement économique (Iktisat Fakültesi nesriyatı no. 101, Istanbul: Faculty of Economics, Istanbul University, and Faculty of Political Sciences, Ankara University, 1958).
- H.J. Habakkuk, 'English Landownership, 1680–1740', Economic History Review 1st series 10.1 (February 1940), pp. 2–17.

== See also ==
Habakkuk thesis

Academic offices
Preceded by John Christie	Principal of Jesus College, Oxford; 1967–1984	Succeeded by Sir Peter North
Preceded by Lord Bullock of Leafield	Vice-Chancellor of Oxford University; 1973–1977	Succeeded by Sir Rex Richards
Preceded by Geoffrey Elton	President of the Royal Historical Society; 1977–1981	Succeeded by J. C. Holt
