= Earl J. Hamilton =

American historian

Earl Jefferson Hamilton (1899 – 7 May 1989) was a historian born in the United States of America, one of the founders of economic history, and a prominent hispanist.

== Biography ==
Hamilton was born in Houlka, Mississippi.

He was married to Gladys Dallas Hamilton, and had one daughter, Sita Hamilton. Earl and Gladys did extensive research on the economic history of Spain.

He was professor of Duke University from 1927 to 1944; Northwestern University from 1944 to 1947, and the University of Chicago from 1947 to 1967. The State University of New York appointed him Distinguished Professor of Economic History (1966–1969). Editor of Journal of Political Economy for seven years. President of Economic History Association (1951–1952).

Hamilton was a proponent of the quantity theory of money and a friend of Milton Friedman, who later restated the theory as monetarism. Unlike the later cliometricians, however, Hamilton did not view economy as a natural science or attempt to substitute mathematical models for historical argumentation.

His major contribution was the history of prices in Spain: the concept of Price Revolution in the 16th century. The work of Hamilton was coincident intellectually with keynesianism and contemporary crisis of 1929. He started his work on this topic within the International scientific committee on price history, within which he was responsible for Spain.

He died on May 7, 1989.

== Works ==
- American Treasure and the Price Revolution in Spain, 1501-1650 Harvard Economic Studies, 43. Cambridge, Massachusetts: Harvard University Press, 1934.
- Money, prices and wages in Valencia, Aragon and Navarre, 1351-1500 Cambridge, Massachusetts, 1936
- War and Prices in Spain, 1651-1800 Cambridge, Massachusetts Harvard University Press, 1947

== See also ==
- A Program for Monetary Reform (1939)
