= Edwin Francis Gay =

American economist (1867–1946)

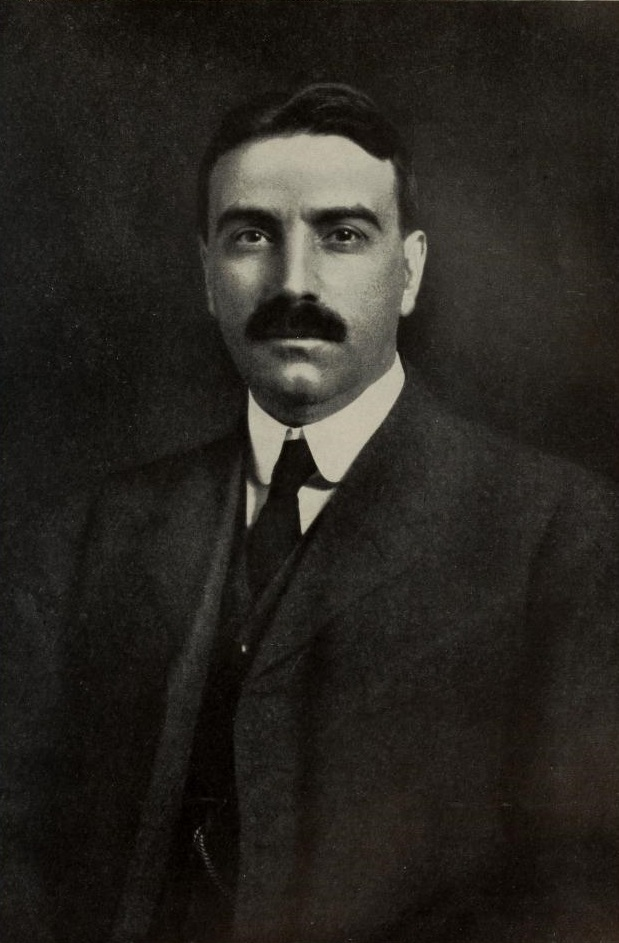
- Portrait of Edwin Francis Gay
- Born: October 27, 1867; Detroit, Michigan, U.S.
- Died: February 8, 1946 (aged 78); Pasadena, California, U.S.
- Education: University of Michigan (AB); University of Berlin (PhD)
- Children: 2

Edwin Francis Gay (October 27, 1867 – February 8, 1946) was an American economist, professor of economic history, and the first dean of Harvard Business School.

== Early life ==
Born in Detroit to a rich businessman, Gay attended schools in the United States and in Switzerland. In 1890, he obtained his A.B. in history and philosophy at the University of Michigan. He returned to Europe to study agriculture, industry, trade, and history at universities in Leipzig, Göttingen, Zurich, Berlin and London. In 1892, he married his Michigan classmate Louise Randolph, with whom he shared his research. In 1902, he received his PhD from the University of Berlin under supervision of Gustav Schmoller.

== Career ==
Back in the United States, in 1902, Gay was appointed instructor at Harvard University, replacing William Ashley. In 1903, he was promoted to Assistant Professor, and in 1906 to Professor in the chair of Economic History at Harvard.

Gay was the first Dean of the Harvard Business School from 1908 to 1919. The Harvard Business School was founded in 1908 and started the first year with 59 students. In the 1920s, there were over 500 students.

Gay served as chairman of the planning and statistics division of the War Industries Board during World War I. He was a founding member of the Council on Foreign Relations, and served as its first elected secretary and treasurer from 1921 to 1933, then as vice-president until 1944, succeeding co-founder Paul D. Cravath.

Gay was elected to the American Academy of Arts and Sciences in 1913. In 1921, he was elected as a Fellow of the American Statistical Association. He was elected to the American Philosophical Society in 1932. From 1929 onwards, he was the representative for America and de facto co-chairman of the International Scientific Committee on Price History.

He was president of the New York Evening Post from 1920 to 1923.

== Personal life ==
Gay had a son and daughter, Edward R. and Margaret. He lived on Orlando Road in San Marino.

Gay died on February 8, 1946, at Huntington Memorial Hospital in Pasadena.

== Selected publications ==
Books, a selection:

- Burritt, A. W., Dennison, H. S., Gay, E. F., Heilman, R. E., & Kendall, H. P. (1918). Profit Sharing, Its Principles and Practice: A Collaboration. Harper & Brothers.
- Gay, Edwin Francis. The rhythm of history. 1923.
- Gay, Edwin Francis, et al. Facts and factors in economic history: articles by former students of Edwin Francis Gay. Harvard University Press, 1932.
- Hamilton, Alexander, Arthur H. Cole, and Edwin Francis Gay. Industrial and Commercial Correspondence of Alexander Hamilton: Anticipating His Report on Manufactures. Augustus M. Kelley, 1968.

Articles, a selection:

- Gay, Edwin Francis. "The Inquisitions of Depopulation in 1517 and the'Domesday of Inclosures'." Transactions of the Royal Historical Society 14.1 (1900): 231-303.

About Gay:

- Heaton, Herbert. A scholar in action, Edwin F. Gay. (1952, reprinted Greenwood Press, 1968).

== Honors ==
To his memory, the "Edwin F. Gay Award for Economic History" was created.

== Archives and records ==
- Dean's Office Correspondence Files (Edwin F. Gay, Dean) at Baker Library Special Collections, Harvard Business School.
