= Anne S. Tsui =

American professor of international management

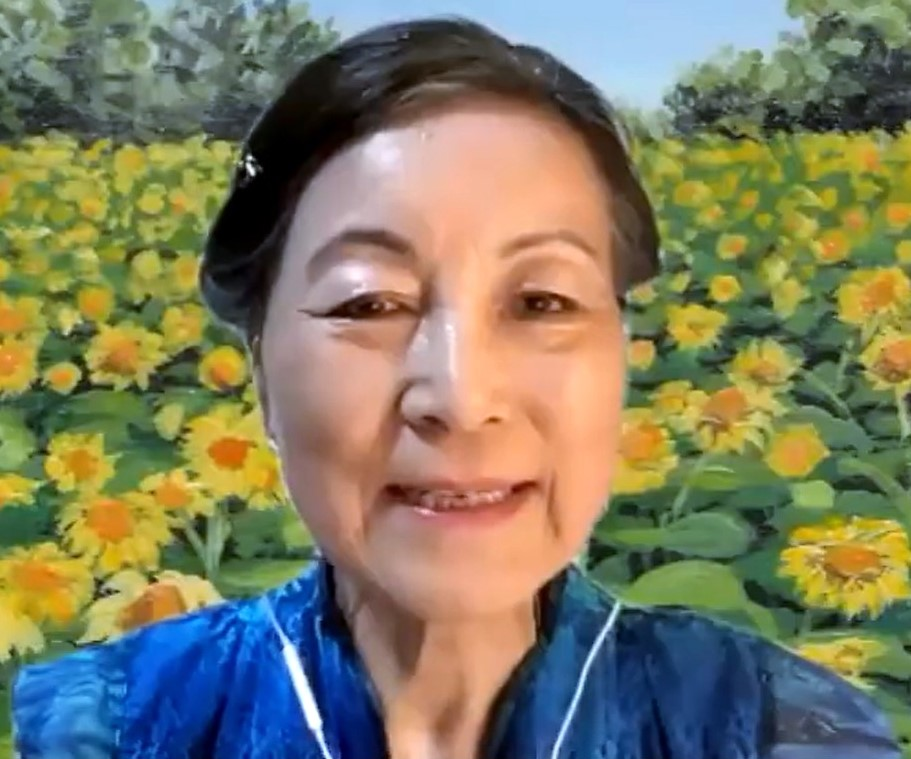
- Tsui in 2018
- Born: Shanghai, China
- Education: University of Minnesota, Duluth, University of Minnesota, University of California, Los Angeles
- Scientific career
- Fields: International management
- Workplaces: Arizona State University, University of Notre Dame, Peking University, Fudan University

Anne S. Tsui is a professor of International management, who holds the positions of Motorola Professor Emerita of International Management at Arizona State University, distinguished adjunct professor at the University of Notre Dame, and distinguished visiting professor at Peking University and Fudan University, China.

Tsui was the 67th president of the Academy of Management, the founding president of the International Association for Chinese Management Research, and is a co-founder of the international scholarly group Responsible Research in Business and Management.

In 2021, Tsui was named a Fellow of the American Association for the Advancement of Science "For distinguished contributions to the field of management and organizational behavior particularly for research on the critical role of ethical and credible behavior on the part of leaders in business."

== Early life and education ==
Anne Shuk-Ying Tsui was born near Shanghai, China. She attended primary and secondary school in Hong Kong.

Tsui came to the United States in 1970 to attend university. From the University of Minnesota, Duluth she received a BA in psychology with a minor in business administration in 1973. She then went to the University of Minnesota in Minneapolis-Saint Paul, Minnesota, where she earned her MA in industrial relations in 1975. While completing her master's degree, she also worked in the Personnel Department at the University of Minnesota Hospitals. She then worked for the Human Resource Department at Control Data Corporation. In 1978, Tsui entered the University of California, Los Angeles where she earned a PhD in behavioral and organizational sciences in 1981.

== Career ==
Tsui was an assistant professor at the Fuqua School of Management at Duke University from 1981 to 1988. She moved to the University of California, Irvine in 1988, receiving tenure in 1990.

In 1993 she taught a summer course at the Hong Kong University of Science and Technology (HKUST). In 1995, she was invited to become the Founding Head of the Management Department in the Business School at HKUST where she remained until 2003. She spent a sabbatical year at Peking University from 2000 to 2001 and has been a distinguished visiting professor at the Guanghua School of Management of Peking University, China since 2000.

Tsui joined Arizona State University in 2003 as the Motorola Professor of International Management. She became the Motorola Professor of International Management Emerita as of 2011. In addition, she has been an honorary professor at Nanjing University (2009–2012), research director of the Guanghua/CISCO Leadership Institute of Peking University (2010–2016), distinguished visiting professor at Shanghai Jiaotong University, China (2011–2016), distinguished visiting professor at Fudan University, China (2013–), and distinguished adjunct professor at the University of Notre Dame (2014–).

Tsui was the 14th Editor of the Academy of Management Journal from 1996 to 1999. She became the founding president of the International Association for Chinese Management Research in 2002. She founded the Management and Organization Review for Chinese management research, becoming editor-in-chief as of 2003. Tsui served as 67th president of the Academy of Management from 2011 to 2012. Her presidential address focused “On compassionate scholarship: Why should we care?”.

Tsui is a co-founder with Jerry Davis of Responsible Research in Business and Management (RRBM). In 2017 an initial group of 28 international scholars published the position paper "A vision for responsible research in business and management: Striving for useful and credible knowledge", revised in 2020. The organization was formed in response to the “credibility crisis” in the social sciences and the “relevance crisis” in business and management studies. Tsui has suggested that business and management should not treat the issues of rigor (credibility of evidence) and relevance (usefulness of knowledge) separately, as has often been done in the research literature, but recognize their inter-relatedness.

== Research ==
Tsui has studied business in both America and China and encourages scholars to collaborate internationally and to study leadership as it is practiced in China. In addition to comparative studies, she emphasizes the importance of scientific freedom, ethical and credible behavior, and responsible leadership in business. She encourages people to approach their work with the values of compassion, optimism, responsibility and engagement (CORE).

Tsui is a highly ranked scholar in the field of management who has been cited more than 20,000 times according to Google scholar. Tsui has published more than 100 articles and 12 books. She is the co-author with Barbara Gutek of Demographic Differences in Organizations: Current Research and Future Direction (1999), which was a finalist for the Terry Book Award, of the Academy of Management in 2000. She also co-authored China's domestic private firms : multidisciplinary perspectives on management and performance (2006).

"Being different: Relational demography and organizational attachment" was published in the Administrative Science Quarterly (ASQ) in 1992. In 1993, it was awarded the Outstanding Publication in Organizational Behavior Award from the Organizational Behavior Division of the Academy of Management. In 1998, it received the ASQ Award for Scholarly Contribution, given to the paper in the preceding five years that had the greatest influence on theory and research.

"Alternative approaches to employee-organization relationships: Does investment in employees pay off?" appeared in the Academy of Management Journal (AMJ) in 1997. In 1998 it was awarded both the AMJ best paper award and the Scholarly Achievement Award given by the Human Resource Division of the Academy of Management. The paper was described as “an extremely ambitious study on a fundamental and important topic" and "an exemplar of high-risk, high payoff research."

"Cross-national, cross-cultural organizational behavior research: Advances, gaps, and recommendations", which appeared in the Journal of Management (JOM) in 2007, won a 2012 Journal of Management Scholarly Impact best paper award.

== Awards ==
- 2021, Fellow, American Association for the Advancement of Science.
- 2021, Woman of the Year Award, Women in the Academy of International Business (WAIB)
- 2016, IACMR Lifetime Contribution Award, International Association for Chinese Management Research
- 2016, Fellow. Academy of International Business
- 2015, Honorary Doctorate in Economics, University of St. Gallen, Switzerland.
- 2015, Distinguished Service Contribution Award, Academy of Management
- 2014, Outstanding Achievement Award, University of Minnesota
- 2008, Walter F. Ulmer, Jr. Applied Research Leadership Award, Center for Creative Leadership, Greensboro, NC
- 1997, Fellow, Academy of Management

== Selected papers ==
- Tsui, Anne S. (21 January 2022). "From Traditional Research to Responsible Research: The Necessity of Scientific Freedom and Scientific Responsibility for Better Societies". Annual Review of Organizational Psychology and Organizational Behavior. 9 (1): 1–32. doi:10.1146/annurev-orgpsych-062021-021303. ISSN 2327-0608. S2CID 244238570.
- Tsui, Anne S. (1 June 2021). "Responsible Research and Responsible Leadership Studies". Academy of Management Discoveries. 7 (2): 166–170. doi:10.5465/amd.2019.0244. S2CID 211438268.
- Community for Responsible Research in Business and Management (2020). "A vision for responsible research in business and management: Striving for useful and credible knowledge. Position Paper" (PDF). Responsible Research in Business and Management (2nd ed.).
- Tsui, A. S. (2013). "On compassion in scholarship: why should we care?". Academy of Management Review. 38 (2): 167–181. doi:10.1177/0001839213520131. S2CID 145599812.
- Tsui, Anne S.; Nifadkar, Sushil; Ou, Amy Yi (2007). "Cross-National, Cross-Cultural Organizational Behavior Research: Advances, Gaps, and Recommendations". Journal of Management. 33 (3): 426–478. doi:10.1177/0149206307300818. S2CID 18344501.
- Tsui, Anne S.; Pearce, Jone L.; Porter, Lyman W.; Tripoli, Angela M. (1997). "Alternative Approaches to the Employee-Organization Relationship: Does Investment in Employees Pay off?". The Academy of Management Journal. 40 (5): 1089–1121. JSTOR 256928. S2CID 202372546.
- Tsui, Anne S.; Egan, Terri D.; O'Reilly III, Charles A. (1992). "Being Different: Relational Demography and Organizational Attachment" (PDF). Administrative Science Quarterly. 37 (4): 549–579. doi:10.2307/2393472. JSTOR 2393472.
