= Habakkuk thesis =

The Habakkuk thesis, proposed and named after British economist Sir John Habakkuk, is a theory that land abundance and labor scarcity in antebellum America led to high wages, which resulted in effective searches for labor-saving technological innovations. This stimulated the growth of machinery and the development of the American system of manufacturing. Initially published in Habakkuk's 1962 work, American and British Technology in the Nineteenth Century: The Search for Labor-Saving Inventions, the thesis garnered attention as the classical interpretation and explanation of American industrialization. The thesis has been criticized for leaving out high interest rates, lack of machinery as capital and scarce and expensive factors (e.g. labor and capital).

== Labor scarcity and high wages ==
According to the Habakkuk Thesis, the underlying stimulus of American technological progress was the scarcity of labor in the first half of the 19th century. In American and British Technology in the Nineteenth Century: The Search for Labor-Saving Inventions, Habakkuk writes, “It seems obvious -- it certainly seemed so to contemporaries -- that the dearness and inelasticity of American, compared to British, labour gave the American entrepreneur with a given capital a greater inducement that his British counterpart to replace labour by machines”.

Labor scarcity was induced by the abundance of cheap, fertile land in the United States, which meant that many people engaged in agriculture because earnings and output were both high and accrued to the cultivator. Since returns to agriculture were high, this caused industrial wages to rise for the manufacturing sector to attract workers. This increase in wages and costs provoked companies to search for a more mechanized method that saved labor. Habakkuk proposed that America ended up choosing a more capital-intensive technique of manufacturing in order to conserve labor. To further his argument he points out that increased demand for labor in the early 19th century raised the wages of unskilled labor more than that of skilled labor. The shortage of labor was mainly felt in the division of unskilled labor, which caused the disparity between wages of skilled and unskilled workers. In many cases, the capital-intensive technique of manufacturing required more skilled labor than the labor-intensive technique. And since wages for skilled labor were lower relative to unskilled labor, it rationalized the push for capital-intensive and labor saving innovations. In return, companies sought to mechanize the simple operations of the costly unskilled workers.

== Technology and innovation ==
Habakkuk acknowledges that at first, technical progress was more empirical than scientific. The labor-saving innovations that he proposed were only modifications to older apparatuses, as opposed to a great leap of scientific knowledge that led to a new invention. He uses the different methods of spinning as an example: the spinning jenny, the water-frame, the spinning mule, the power loom and finally the variations of the automatic loom. Each of the methods built on the previous one until the textile industry was satisfied with the efficiency of the automatic loom. However, he proposes that labor scarcity gave manufacturers a greater incentive to explore and adopt "inventions of purely autonomous origin" in order to save labor and capital. Moreover, labor scarcity induced both a higher rate of technical progress and a greater willingness to forgo existing machinery.

== Critiques ==
The thesis fails to address many problems. It does not acknowledge the high interest rates prevalent in antebellum America. In addition to labor, capital and other factors were scarce and expensive. Capital at the time was mainly composed of structures and inventories, not machinery.

A prominent critic of the Habakkuk thesis, economic historian Peter Temin argues against two main assumptions: that land is used only for agriculture and secondly that only manufacturing and the relative price of agricultural manufactured goods are fixed. If these assumptions hold, then Peter Temin argues that an abundance of land would increase the demand for agricultural labor, siphon labor away from manufacturing sector into farming, and raise the capital-labor ratio in manufacturing as a result. Along with Don Adams and Nathan Rosenberg, Temin approaches a low-cost labor interpretation of early 19th century America in opposition to Habakukk's high-cost interpretation.

== Related Readings ==
Earlier writings on the subject of technological change: the induced innovation hypothesis by J.R. Hicks who proposed in 1932 that the “change in the relative prices of the factors of production is itself a spur to invention, and to invention of a particular kind – directed to economizing the use of a factor which has become relatively expensive.” The Habakukk Thesis can be viewed as an extension of Hicks' work, although Habakkuk's book hardly cites Hicks.

Another work prior to that of Habakukk is E. Rothbarth's theory in his article “Causes of the superior efficiency of U.S.A. industry as compared with British industry". In it, he argues that the superior efficiency American industry was due to the larger market.

Daron Acemoglu’s paper “Directed Technical Change” analyzes the effects of price and market size of technical change.

== Modern applications ==
Robert C. Allen argues that (relatively) high wages and (relatively) cheap energy are key to understanding the British Industrial Revolution.

See https://pseudoerasmus.com/2016/12/01/allen/ for a detailed analysis of the 'Induced Innovation' argument. Especially the relevance of Unit Labour Costs not just the wage.

See "The Habakkuk thesis in a neoclassical framework" (2014) at https://hal.archives-ouvertes.fr/hal-01206032/document for a neoclassical formalization of factor-saving technical change.

The theory of 'unequal exchange' as presented by Arghiri Emmanuel is also partly inspired by Habbakuk's thesis.

See J. Brolin 'Unequal Exchange' in I. Ness and Z. Cope (eds) The Palgrave Encyclopedia of Imperialism and Anti-Imperialism (Palgrave Macmillan, Cham 2020) (at https://link.springer.com/referenceworkentry/10.1007/978-3-319-91206-6_280-1)
