= Fritz Leonhard Redlich =

German businessman and American economic historian

Fritz Leonhard Redlich (April 7, 1892 – October 21, 1978) was a German businessman and American economic historian. He was a pioneer of the history of entrepreneurship and the author of a widely respected study of American banking.

== Life ==
Redlich was born in Berlin to Moritz Silvius Redlich, a merchant, and Emma (née Mühsam).

He was educated in Germany, where he obtained his doctorate in economics in 1914, with a thesis supervised by Ignaz Jastrow. He wrote his thesis on the tar industry in Germany. Throughout the First World War he served as a cavalry officer, and after it he took over the family business.

In 1936, he migrated from Germany to the United States to escape anti-Jewish persecution. He taught in the Economics Department at Mercer University.

Middle-aged, he returned to interests in the history of business and entrepreneurship dating from his student days, and sought an academic position. While teaching at minor colleges in the United States without ever acquiring tenure, he became an associate member of Harvard University's Research Center in Entrepreneurial History in 1952 where he worked until his retirement.

His mother, Emma, died in the Holocaust in 1943.

He died in Newton, Massachusetts, on 21 October 1978.

== Publications ==
- Die volkswirtschaftliche Bedeutung der deutschen Teerfarbenindustrie (1914)
- Reklame. Begriff, Geschichte, Theorie (1935)
- History of American Business Leaders, vol. 1 (1940)
- The Molding of American Banking: Men and Ideas (2 vols, 1947–1951)
- De Praeda Militari: Looting and Booty, 1500–1815 (1956)
- The German Military Enterpriser and his Work Force (2 vols, 1964–1965)

== Recognition and awards ==
Redlich was awarded honorary doctorates by Erlangen University (1960) and Berlin University (1967).
