= John Harold Clapham =

British economic historian

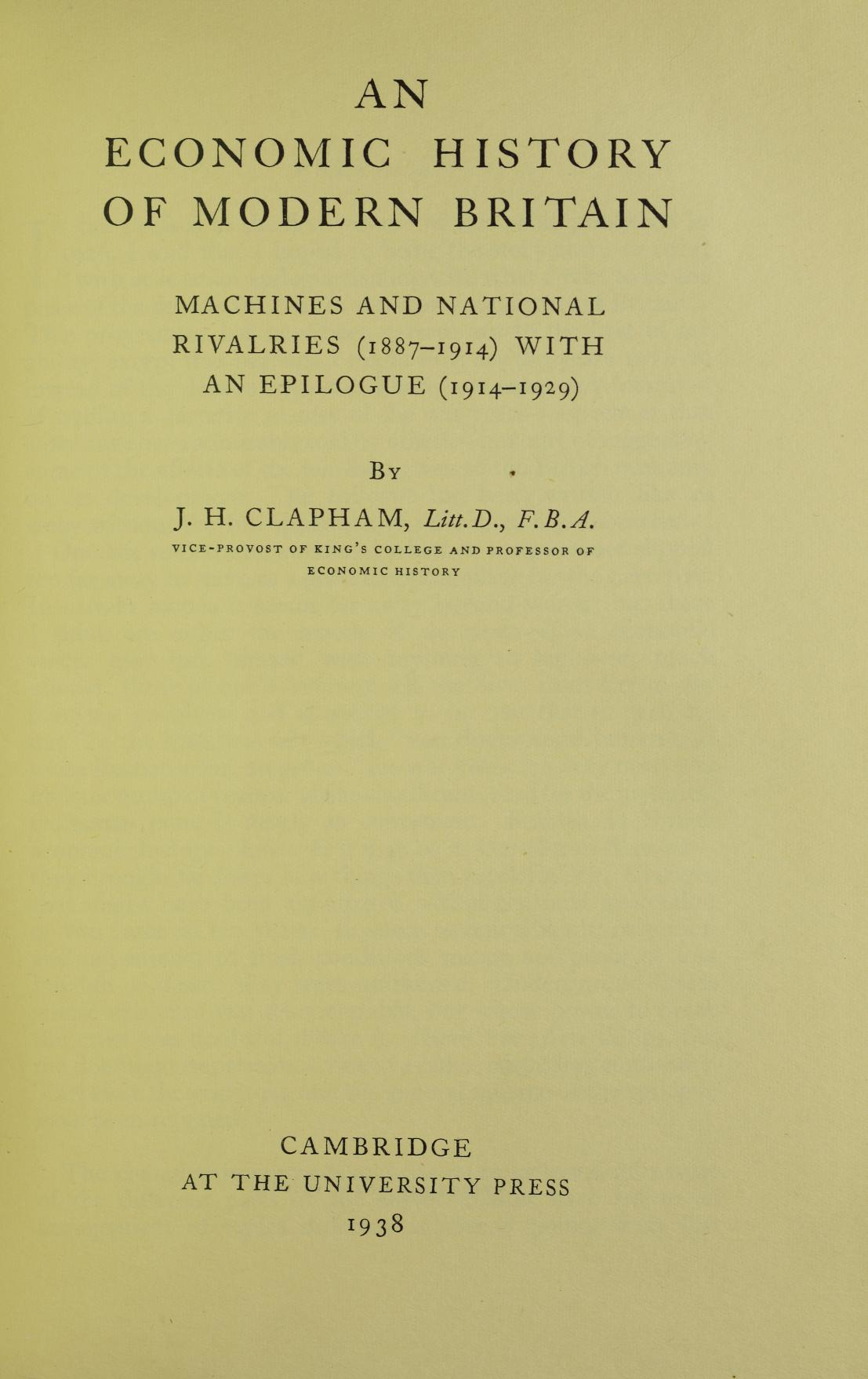
Machines and National Rivalries (1887-1914), 1938 online edition

Sir John Harold Clapham, CBE, FBA (13 September 1873 – 29 March 1946) was a British economic historian.

He was educated at The Leys School in Cambridge and King's College, Cambridge. From 1889 to 1902 he was a lecturer in History and Economics at Leeds University and was Professor of Economics there from 1902 to 1908. He was the first Professor of Economic History at Cambridge University from 1928 to 1938, and Vice-Provost of King's College, Cambridge from 1933 until 1943 when he received a knighthood.

Between 1926 and 1938 he published, in three volumes, An Economic History of Modern Britain. He is also recognised for his study of the Industrial Revolution in England, and for describing cooperatives in the initiation of the revolution. He is also remembered for his 1944 The Bank of England, A History. He was a founder of the Cambridge Historical Journal.

Welsh economic historian Sir John Habakkuk was one of his students. One of Clapham's more notable quotations is: "Economic advance is not the same thing as human progress".

Clapham's son was the printer and industrialist Sir Michael Clapham.
