= Patrick K. O'Brien =

British historian

Patrick Karl O'Brien FRHistS FBA (born 12 August 1932) is a British historian who serves as Professor Emeritus of Global Economic History at the London School of Economics and Political Science.

== Life ==
O'Brien received a DPhil from Nuffield College, Oxford, in 1960 for a thesis entitled Government Revenue, 1793–1815: A Study of Fiscal and Financial Policy in the Wars Against France, supervised by Sir John Habakkuk and Max Hartwell. He began his career at SOAS, where he worked as a research fellow from 1960 to 1963, and as a lecturer from 1963 to 1970. In 1970, he joined St Antony's College, Oxford, as university lecturer in economic history. He became a University Reader in Economic History and a Professorial Fellow in 1984.

In 1990, O'Brien was appointed as director of the Institute of Historical Research and Professor of Economic History at the University of London. He eventually retired as Emeritus Professor of Economic History in 1998. He joined the London School of Economics (LSE) in 1999 as Centennial Professor of Economic History and Convenor of the Network in Global Economic History (GEHN) at the Department of Economic History. Since 2009, he has been Professor of Global Economic History at LSE.

During his academic career, O'Brien held many visiting positions. They included: visiting lecturer at Harvard University in 1968, visiting associate professor at UC Berkeley in 1969, visiting professor at Yale in 1978, fellow of the Davis Center at Princeton University in 1983, visiting professor at the European University Institute in Florence in 1984, visiting professor at UC San Diego in 1986, visiting professor at Columbia University in 1990, visiting professor at Charles III University of Madrid in 1993, Visiting Simon Professor at the University of Manchester in 1999, visiting fellow at LMU Munich in 2003, Erasmus Mundus Visiting Professor at Tsinghua University in 2010 and Erasmus Mundus Visiting Professor at Fudan University in 2013.
