= Business Archives Council =

Archival organization in the UK

- Formation: 1934
- Type: Charity
- Purpose: Preservation of business records
- Headquarters: London
- Publication: Business Archives
- Website: businessarchivescouncil.org.uk

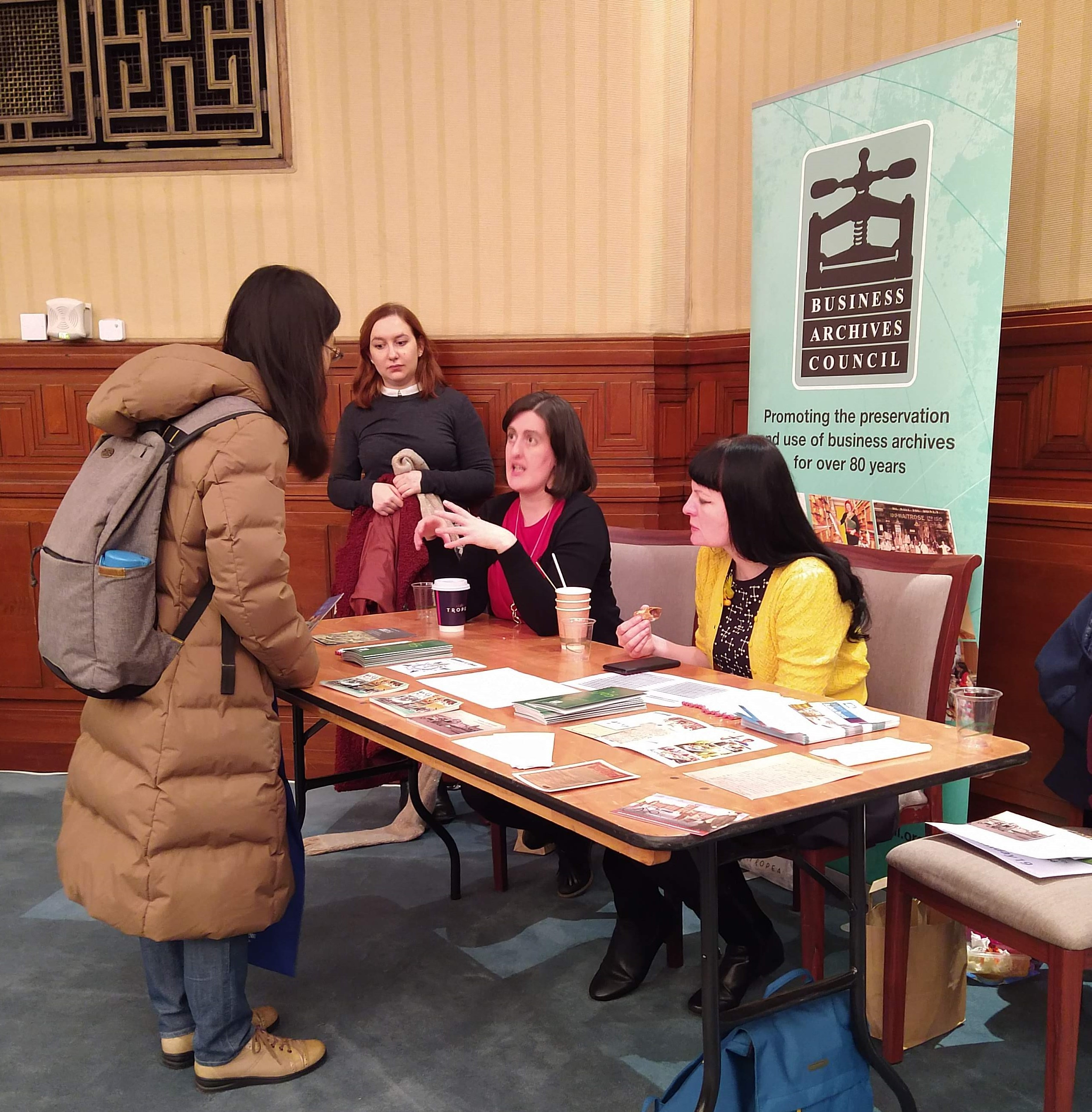
The Business Archives Council at the Senate House History Day, 2019.

The Business Archives Council is an organisation based in London that exists to promote the preservation of business records of historical significance. It was founded in 1934 and publishes a journal Business Archives, a newsletter, and books in conjunction with Manchester University Press and Ashgate. It is a registered charity number 313336.

== Selected publications ==
=== General ===
- Lesley Richmond and Bridget Stockford. Company Archives: A Survey of the Records of 1000 of the First Registered Companies in England and Wales. Gower, Aldershot, 1986. ISBN 0566035472
- Lesley Richmond & Alison Turton. (Eds.) Directory of Corporate Archives. 4th edition. Business Archives Council, 1996.

=== Industries ===
- Lesley Richmond and Alison Turton. (Eds.) The Brewing Industry: A Guide to Historical Records. Manchester University Press, Manchester, 1990. ISBN 0719030323
- L. A. Ritchie. (Ed.) The Shipbuilding Industry: A Guide to Historical Records. Manchester University Press, Manchester, 1992. ISBN 0719038057
- Wendy Habgood. (Ed.) Chartered Accountants in England and Wales. A Guide to Historical Records. Manchester University Press, Manchester, 1994. ISBN 0719042291
- Alison Turton & John Orbell. British Banking. A Guide to Historical Records. New edition. Ashgate, Aldershot, 2001. ISBN 0754602958
- Lesley Richmond, Julie Stevenson & Alison Turton. (Eds.) The Pharmaceutical Industry. A Guide to Historical Records. Ashgate, Aldershot, 2003. ISBN 0754633527
