= Arthur H. Cole =

American economic historian

Cole, c. 1941

Arthur Harrison Cole (November 21, 1889 – November 10, 1974) was an American economic historian and was the head of the Harvard University Business School's library. Cole created the Research Center in Entrepreneurial History that was addressed by Joseph Schumpeter, and that had as participants several graduate students who later went on to distinguished careers in economic history.

He graduated from Bowdoin College and Harvard University.
