= Historiography of the United Kingdom =

Historical, archival research and writing of the UK

The historiography of the United Kingdom includes the historical and archival research and writing on the history of the United Kingdom, United Kingdom of Great Britain and Ireland, Great Britain, England, Scotland, Ireland, and Wales. For studies of the overseas empire see historiography of the British Empire.

== Medieval ==
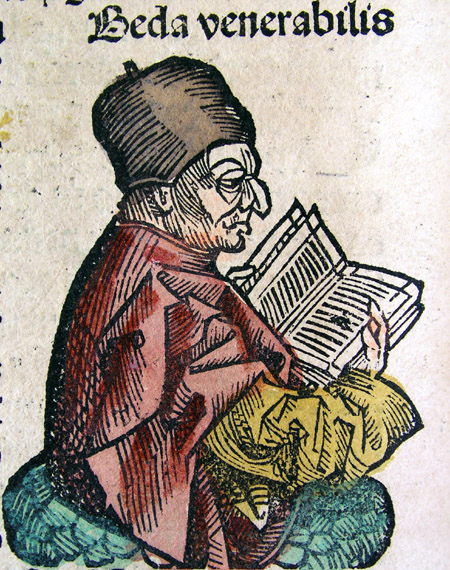
Depiction of Bede from the Nuremberg Chronicle, 1493

Gildas, a fifth-century Romano-British monk, was the first major historian of Wales and England. His De Excidio et Conquestu Britanniae (in Latin, "On the Ruin and Conquest of Britain") records the downfall of the Britons at the hands of Saxon invaders, emphasizing God's anger and providential punishment of an entire nation, in an echo of Old Testament themes. His work has often been used by later historians, starting with Bede.

Bede (673–735), an English monk, was the most influential historian of the Anglo-Saxon era both in his time and in contemporary England. He borrowed from Gildas and others in writing The Ecclesiastical History of the English People (Latin: "Historia Ecclesiastica Gentis Anglorum"). He viewed English history as a unity, based around the Christian church. N.J. Higham argues that he designed his work to promote his reform agenda to Ceolwulf, the Northumbrian king. Bede painted a highly optimistic picture of the current situation in the Church.

Numerous chroniclers prepared detailed accounts of recent history. King Alfred the Great commissioned the Anglo-Saxon Chronicle in 893, and similar chronicles were prepared throughout the Middle Ages. The most famous production is by a transplanted Frenchman, Jean Froissart (c. 1337–1410). His Froissart's Chronicles, written in French, remains an important source for the first half of the Hundred Years' War.

== Tudor–Stuart ==
Sir Walter Raleigh (1554–1618), educated at Oxford, was a soldier, courtier, and humanist during the late Renaissance in England. Convicted of intrigues against the king, he was imprisoned in the Tower and wrote his incomplete History of the World. Using a wide array of sources in six languages, Raleigh was fully abreast of the latest continental scholarship. He wrote not about England, but of the ancient world with a heavy emphasis on geography. Despite his intention of providing current advice to the King of England, King James I complained that it was "too sawcie in censuring Princes". Raleigh was freed, but later beheaded for offences not related to his historiography.

=== English Reformation ===
The historiography of the English Reformation has seen vigorous clashes among dedicated protagonists and scholars for five centuries. The main factual details at the national level have been clear since 1900, as laid out, for example, by James Anthony Froude and Albert Pollard.

Reformation historiography has seen many schools of interpretation with Protestant, Catholic, and Anglican historians using their own religious perspectives. In addition there has been a highly influential Whig interpretation, based on liberal secularised Protestantism, that depicted the Reformation in England, in the words of Ian Hazlitt, as "the midwife delivering England from the Dark Ages to the threshold of modernity, and so a turning point of progress". Finally, among the older schools was a neo-Marxist interpretation that stressed the economic decline of the old elites in the rise of the landed gentry and middle classes. All these approaches still have representatives, but the main thrust of scholarly historiography since the 1970s falls into four groupings or schools, according to Hazlett.

Geoffrey Elton lead the first faction with an agenda rooted in political historiography. It concentrates on the top of the early modern church-state, looking at the mechanics of policy-making and the organs of its implementation and enforcement. The key player for Elton was not Henry VIII, but rather his principal Secretary of State Thomas Cromwell. Elton downplayed the prophetic spirit of the religious reformers in the theology of keen conviction, dismissing them as the meddlesome intrusions from fanatics and bigots.

Secondly, a primarily religious perspective has motivated Geoffrey Dickens and others. They prioritise the religious and subjective side of the movement. While recognising the Reformation was imposed from the top, just as it was everywhere else in Europe, it also responded to aspirations from below. He has been criticised by for underestimating the strength of residual and revived Roman Catholicism. He has been praised for his demonstration of the close ties to European influences. In the Dickens school, David Loades has stressed the theological importance of the Reformation for Anglo-British development.

Revisionists comprise a third school, led by Christopher Haigh, Jack Scarisbrick and numerous other scholars. Their main achievement was the discovery of an entirely new corpus of primary sources at the local level, leading them to the emphasis on the Reformation as it played out on a daily and local basis, with much less emphasis on the control from the top. They emphasise turning away from elite sources and instead focus on local parish records, diocesan files, guild records, data from boroughs, the courts, and especially telltale individual wills.

Finally, Patrick Collinson and others brought more precision to the theological landscape, with Calvinist Puritans who were impatient with the cautious Anglican approach of compromises. Indeed, the Puritans were a distinct subgroup who did not comprise all of Calvinism. The Church of England thus emerged as a coalition of factions, all of them of Protestant inspiration.

All the recent schools have lowered the relevance of Henry VIII and minimised hagiography. They have paid more attention to localities, Catholicism, radicals, and theological niceties. On Catholicism, the older schools overemphasised Thomas More (1478–1535), to the neglect of other bishops and factors inside Catholicism. The older schools too often concentrated on elite London, the newer ones look to the English villages.

=== Puritanism and the Civil War ===
The rise of Puritanism and the English Civil War are central themes of 17th century English history.

Edward Hyde, Earl of Clarendon (1609–1674), the conservative top aide of the King, wrote the most influential contemporary history of the Civil War, The History of the Rebellion and Civil Wars in England (1702). When he wrote about the distant past, Clarendon used a modern level of scepticism about historical sources, motivations and authority. In his history of the Civil War, however, he relapses to a premodern view that attributes critical events to the intervention of Providence.

The foremost modern historian of the Puritan movement and Civil War is Samuel Rawson Gardiner (1820–1902). His series include History of England from the Accession of James I to the Outbreak of the Civil War, 1603–1642 (1883–4); History of the Great Civil War, 1642–1649 (1893); and History of the Commonwealth and Protectorate, 1649–1660 (1903). Gardiner's treatment is exhaustive and philosophical, taking in political and constitutional history, the changes in religion, thought and sentiment, their causes and their tendencies. Gardiner did not form a school, although his work was completed in two volumes by Charles Harding Firth as The Last Years of the Protectorate (1909).

== 18th century ==
The Enlightenment in both Scotland and England gave strong support to the writing of innovative histories.

=== Opposition histories of the 1740s ===
Alongside ministerial projects such as Nicholas Tindal's continuation of Rapin, the 1740s saw opposition, Country-Whig histories conceived as paired works: William Guthrie's General History of England (1744–51) carried the narrative to 1688, while James Ralph's The History of England, During the Reigns of King William, Queen Anne, and King George I (1744–46) treated the post-Revolution decades. Ralph’s history combined constitutional narrative with quantitative materials (customs and excise series, national-debt tables, army returns) and offered a document-driven reassessment of earlier Whig and Tory accounts, including Gilbert Burnet's work.

=== William Robertson ===
William Robertson, a Scottish historian and the Historiographer Royal, published a History of Scotland 1542–1603 in 1759, and his most famous work, The History of the Reign of Charles V, in 1769. His scholarship was painstaking for the time and he was able to access a large number of documentary sources that had previously been unstudied. He was also one of the first historians who understood the importance of general and universally applicable ideas in the shaping of historical events.

=== David Hume ===
Scottish philosopher and historian David Hume in 1754 published the History of England, a six-volume work which extended "From the Invasion of Julius Caesar to the Revolution in 1688". Hume adopted a similar scope to Voltaire in his history; as well as the history of Kings, Parliaments, and armies, he examined the history of culture, including literature and science. His short biographies of leading scientists explored the process of scientific change and he developed new ways of seeing scientists in the context of their times by looking at how they interacted with society and each other – he paid special attention to Francis Bacon, Robert Boyle, Isaac Newton and William Harvey.

He also argued that the quest for liberty was the highest standard for judging the past, and concluded that after considerable fluctuation, England at the time of his writing had achieved "the most entire system of liberty, that was ever known amongst mankind".

=== Edward Gibbon ===
Edward Gibbon and his famous masterpiece Decline and Fall of the Roman Empire (1776–1789) set a literary standard for historians, and set a standard of scholarly research that was widely emulated. In the 20th century, a number of scholars have been inspired by Gibbon. Piers Brendon notes that Gibbon's work "became the essential guide for Britons anxious to plot their own imperial trajectory. They found the key to understanding the British Empire in the ruins of Rome."

== 19th century ==
=== Whig history ===
Much of the historical writing by historians and novelists reflected the spirit of Romanticism. Whig history typically prevailed—using an approach which presents the past as an inevitable progression towards ever greater liberty and enlightenment, culminating in modern forms of liberal democracy and constitutional monarchy. In general, Whig historians emphasised the rise of constitutional government, personal freedoms and scientific progress. The term has also been applied widely in historical disciplines outside of British history (the history of science, for example) to criticise any teleological (or goal-directed), hero-based, and transhistorical narrative. The term "Whig history" was coined by Herbert Butterfield in his book The Whig Interpretation of History in 1931.

Paul Rapin de Thoyras's history of England, published in 1723, became "the classic Whig history" for the first half of the 18th century. It was later supplanted by the immensely popular The History of England by David Hume. Whig historians emphasised the achievements of the Glorious Revolution of 1688. This included James Mackintosh's History of the Revolution in England in 1688, William Blackstone's Commentaries on the Laws of England and Henry Hallam's Constitutional History of England.

A major restatement was made in the early 20th century by G. M. Trevelyan. David Cannadine says:

In 1926 he produced his one-volume History of England. This work set out what he saw as the essential elements in the nation’s evolution and identity: parliamentary government, the rule of law, religious toleration, freedom from Continental interference and involvement, and a global horizon of maritime supremacy and imperial expansion.

The Whig consensus was steadily undermined during the post-World War I re-evaluation of European history, and Butterfield's critique exemplified this trend. Intellectuals no longer believed the world was automatically getting better and better. Subsequent generations of academic historians have similarly rejected Whig history because of its presentist and teleological assumption that history is driving toward some sort of goal. Other criticised 'Whig' assumptions included viewing the British system as the apex of human political development, assuming that political figures in the past held current political beliefs (anachronism), considering British history as a march of progress with inevitable outcomes and presenting political figures of the past as heroes, who advanced the cause of this political progress, or villains, who sought to hinder its inevitable triumph. J. Hart says "a Whig interpretation requires human heroes and villains in the story."

=== Macaulay ===
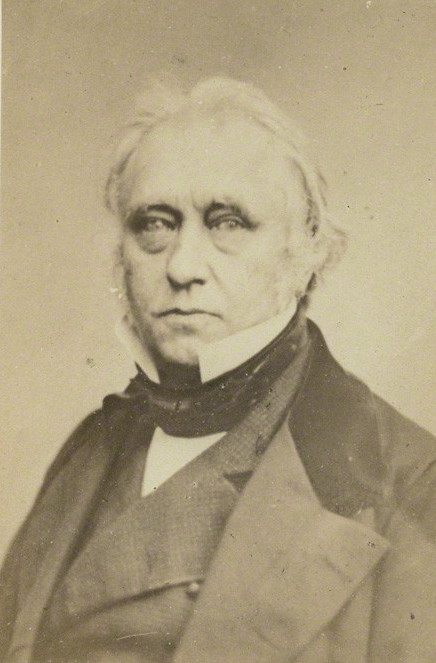
Macaulay was the most influential exponent of Whig history, which said history shows a steady upward improvement toward the present

The most famous exponent of 'Whiggery' was Thomas Babington Macaulay (1800–1859). He published the first volumes of his The History of England from the Accession of James II in 1848. It proved an immediate success and replaced Hume's history to become the new orthodoxy. His writings are famous for their ringing prose and for their confident, sometimes dogmatic, emphasis on a progressive model of British history, according to which the country threw off superstition, autocracy and confusion to create a balanced constitution and a forward-looking culture combined with freedom of belief and expression. This model of human progress has been called the Whig interpretation of history. His 'Whiggish convictions' are spelled out in his first chapter:

I shall relate how the new settlement was...successfully defended against foreign and domestic enemies; how...the authority of law and the security of property were found to be compatible with a liberty of discussion and of individual action never before known; how, from the auspicious union of order and freedom, sprang a prosperity of which the annals of human affairs had furnished no example; how our country, from a state of ignominious vassalage, rapidly rose to the place of umpire among European powers; how her opulence and her martial glory grew together;...how a gigantic commerce gave birth to a maritime power, compared with which every other maritime power, ancient or modern, sinks into insignificance...the history of our country during the last hundred and sixty years is eminently the history of physical, of moral, and of intellectual improvement.

Macaulay's legacy continues to be controversial; Gertrude Himmelfarb wrote that "most professional historians have long since given up reading Macaulay, as they have given up writing the kind of history he wrote and thinking about history as he did." However, J. R. Western wrote: "Despite its age and blemishes, Macaulay's History of England has still to be superseded by a full-scale modern history of the period".

=== County and local history ===
Before the impact of high-powered academic scholarship in the 1960s, local history flourished across Britain, producing many nostalgic local studies. Local historians in 1870–1914 emphasised progress, growth and civic pride. Local history became fashionable in the 18th and 19th centuries; it was widely regarded as an antiquarian pursuit, suitable for country gentry and parsons. The Victoria History of the Counties of England (VCH) project began in 1899 with the aim of creating an encyclopedic history of each of the historic counties of England.

Local history was a strength at Leicester University from 1930. Under W. G. Hoskins it actively promoted the Victoria County Histories. He pushed for greater attention to the community of farmers, labourers and their farms in addition to the traditional strength in manorial and church history. The VCH project is now coordinated by the Institute of Historical Research at the University of London.

H. P. R. Finberg was the first Professor of English Local History; he was appointed by Leicester in 1964. Local history continues to be neglected as an academic subject within universities. Academic local historians are often found within a more general department of history or in continuing education.

The British Association for Local History encourages and assists in the study of local history as an academic discipline and as a leisure activity by both individuals and groups. Most historic counties in England have record societies and archaeological and historical societies which coordinate the work of historians and other researchers concerned with that area.

== 20th century ==
=== Prominent historians ===
Thorold Rogers (1823–1890) was the Tooke Professor of Statistics and Economic Science at King's College London, from 1859 until his death. He served in Parliament as a Liberal, and deployed historical and statistical methods to analyse some of the key economic and social questions of the day on behalf of free trade and social justice. He is best known for compiling the monumental A History of Agriculture and Prices in England from 1259 to 1793 (7 vol. 1866–1902), which is still useful to scholars. William Ashley (1860–1927) introduced British scholars to the historical school of economic history developed in Germany.

The French historian Élie Halévy (1870–1937) wrote a multivolume history of England, 1815–1914; it was translated and greatly influenced scholars with its exploration of the complex interactions among politics, religion, economics, reform and the absence of French-style Jacobite revolution. Halévy sought the answer not in economics but in religion. "If economic facts explain the course taken by the human race, the England of the nineteenth century was surely, above all other countries, destined to revolution, both politically and religiously." Neither the British constitution nor the Church of England was strong enough to hold the country together. He found the answer in religious nonconformity: "Methodism was the antidote to Jacobinism."

G. M. Trevelyan (1876–1962), was widely read by both the general public and scholars. The son of a leading historian, he combined thorough research and primary sources with a lively writing style, a strong patriotic outlook and a Whig view of continuous progress toward democracy. He reached his widest audiences with History of England (1926). The book affirmed Trevelyan as the foremost historical commentator on England. He began his career as a conventional liberal with faith in inevitable progress. Shocked by the horrors of the Great War he witnessed as an ambulance driver just behind the front lines, Trevelyan became more appreciative of conservatism as a positive force, and less confident that progress was inevitable. In History of England (1926) he searched for the deepest meaning of English history.

Cannadine concluded in G. M. Trevelyan: A Life in History (1992)

During the first half of the twentieth century Trevelyan was the most famous, the most honored, the most influential and the most widely read historian of his generation. He was a scion of the greatest historical dynasty that (Britain) has ever produced. He knew and corresponded with many of the greatest figures of his time.... For fifty years, Trevelyan acted as a public moralist, public teacher and public benefactor, wielding unchallenged cultural authority among the governing and the educated classes of his day.

Lewis Namier (1888–1960) had a powerful influence on research methodology among British historians. Born in Poland, his Jewish family was descended from distinguished Talmudic scholars and came to England in 1907. He built his career at Manchester. His best-known works were The Structure of Politics at the Accession of George III (1929), England in the Age of the American Revolution (1930) and the "History of Parliament" series (begun 1940) he edited with John Brooke. He had a microscopic view of history as made by many individuals with few or any themes; it was called "Namierism" and his approach faded after his death. His books typically are starting points for vast enterprises which were never followed up. Thus England in the Age of the American Revolution ends in December 1762.

Herbert Butterfield (1900–1979) is best known for his philosophical approach to historiography.

=== Professionalisation ===
Professionalisation involved developing a career track for historians, creating a national historical association and the sponsorship of scholarly journals. The Royal Historical Society was founded in 1868. The English Historical Review began publication in 1886. Oxford and Cambridge were the most prestigious British universities, but they avoided setting up PhD programs and concentrated their attention on teaching undergraduates through tutors based in the colleges. The endowed chairs, based in the universities as a whole, had much less influence on the teaching of history.

Professionalisation on the German model, with a focus on the research PhD prepared by graduate students under a master professor, was pioneered by Manchester University. J. B. Bury (1861–1927) at Cambridge, Charles Harding Firth (1857–1936) at Oxford, and especially Thomas Frederick Tout (1855–1929) at Manchester led the way.

At Manchester, Tout introduced original research into the undergraduate programme, culminating in the production of a Final Year thesis based on primary sources. This horrified Oxbridge, where college tutors had little research capacity of their own and saw the undergraduate as an embryonic future gentleman, liberal connoisseur, widely read, and mainstay of country and empire in politics, commerce, army, land or church, not an apprentice to dusty, centuries-old archives, wherein no more than 1 in 100 could find even an innocuous career. In taking this view they had a fair case, given the various likelihoods and opportunities for their charges. Tout's ally C. H. Firth fought a bitter campaign to persuade Oxford to follow Manchester and introduce scientific study of sources into the History programme, but failed; there was failure too, at Cambridge. Other universities, however, followed Tout, and Oxbridge slowly made fundamental changes to the selection of college fellows across all disciplines.

=== Class issues: middle class and gentry ===
Marxist historiography developed as a school of historiography influenced by the chief tenets of Marxism, including the centrality of social class and economic constraints in determining historical outcomes. Friedrich Engels wrote The Condition of the Working Class in England in 1844; it inspired the socialist impetus in British politics including the Fabian Society, but did not influence historians.

R. H. Tawney was a powerful influence. His The Agrarian Problem in the Sixteenth Century (1912) and Religion and the Rise of Capitalism (1926) reflected his ethical concerns and preoccupations in economic history. He was profoundly interested in the issue of the enclosure of land in the English countryside in the sixteenth and seventeenth centuries and in Max Weber's thesis on the connection between the appearance of Protestantism and the rise of capitalism.

The "gentry" in Britain comprised the rich landowners who were not members of the aristocracy. The "Storm over the gentry" was a major historiographical debate among scholars that took place in the 1940s and 1950s regarding the role of the gentry in causing the English Civil War of the 17th century. Tawney had suggested in 1941 that there was a major economic crisis for the nobility in the 16th and 17th centuries, and that the rapidly rising gentry class was demanding a share of power. When the aristocracy resisted, Tawney argued, the gentry launched the civil war. After heated debate, historians generally concluded that the role of the gentry was not especially important.

=== Marxist historians ===
A circle of historians inside the Communist Party of Great Britain (CPGB) formed in 1946 and became a highly influential cluster of British Marxist historians, who contributed to history from below and class structure in early capitalist society. While some members of the group (most notably Christopher Hill (1912–2003) and E. P. Thompson) left the CPGB after the 1956 Hungarian Revolution, the common points of British Marxist historiography continued in their works. They placed a great emphasis on the subjective determination of history.

In the 1950s to 1970s, labour history was redefined and expanded in focus by a number of historians, amongst whom the most prominent and influential figures were E. P. Thompson and Eric Hobsbawm. The motivation came from current left-wing politics in Britain and the United States and reached red-hot intensity. Kenneth O. Morgan, a more traditional liberal historian, explains the dynamic:

the ferocity of argument owed more to current politics, the unions' winter of discontent [in 1979], and rise of a hard-left militant tendency within the world of academic history as well as within the Labour Party. The new history was often strongly Marxist, which fed through the work of brilliant evangelists like Raphael Samuel into the New Left Review, a famous journal like Past and Present, the Society of Labour History and the work of a large number of younger scholars engaged in the field. Non-scholars like Tony Benn joined in. The new influence of Marxism upon Labour studies came to affect the study of history.

In many ways, this was highly beneficial: it encouraged the study of the dynamics of social history rather than a narrow formal institutional view of labour and the history of the Labour Party; it sought to place the experience of working people within a wider technical and ideological context; it encouraged a more adventurous range of sources, so-called "history from below", and rescued them from what Thompson memorably called the "condescension of posterity"; it brought the idea of class centre-stage in the treatment of working-class history, where I had always felt it belonged; it shed new light on the poor and dispossessed for whom the source materials were far more scrappy than those for the bourgeoisie, and made original use of popular evidence like oral history, not much used before.

But the Marxist – or sometimes Trotskyist – emphasis in Labour studies was too often doctrinaire and intolerant of non-Marxist dissent–it was also too often plain wrong, distorting the evidence within a narrow doctrinaire framework. I felt it incumbent upon me to help rescue it. But this was not always fun. I recall addressing a history meeting in Cardiff...when, for the only time in my life, I was subjected to an incoherent series of attacks of a highly personal kind, playing the man not the ball, focusing on my accent, my being at Oxford and the supposedly reactionary tendencies of my empiricist colleagues.

Christopher Hill specialised in 17th-century English history. His books include Puritanism and Revolution (1958), Intellectual Origins of the English Revolution (1965 and revised in 1996), The Century of Revolution (1961), AntiChrist in 17th-century England (1971), The World Turned Upside Down (1972) and many others.

E. P. Thompson pioneered the study of history from below in his work, The Making of the English Working Class, published in 1963. It focused on the forgotten history of the first working-class political left in the world in the late-18th and early-19th centuries. In his preface to this book, Thompson set out his approach to writing history from below:

I am seeking to rescue the poor stockinger, the Luddite cropper, the "obsolete" hand-loom weaver, the "Utopian" artisan, and even the deluded follower of Joanna Southcott, from the enormous condescension of posterity. Their crafts and traditions may have been dying. Their hostility to the new industrialism may have been backward-looking. Their communitarian ideals may have been fantasies. Their insurrectionary conspiracies may have been foolhardy. But they lived through these times of acute social disturbance, and we did not. Their aspirations were valid in terms of their own experience; and, if they were casualties of history, they remain, condemned in their own lives, as casualties.

Thompson's work was also significant because of the way he defined "class". He argued that class was not a structure, but a relationship that was mutable. He opened the gates for a generation of labour historians, such as David Montgomery and Herbert Gutman, who made similar studies of the American working class. The British-Thai historian Chris Baker has cited Thompson's large influence on his career.

Other important Marxist historians included Eric Hobsbawm, C. L. R. James, Raphael Samuel, A. L. Morton and Brian Pearce. Although Marxist historiography made important contributions to the history of the working class, oppressed nationalities, and the methodology of history from below, its chief flaw was its argument on the nature of history as determined or dialectical; this can also be stated as the relative importance of subjective and objective factors in creating results. It fell out of favour in the 1960s and '70s. Geoffrey Elton was important in undermining the case for a Marxist historiography, which he argued was presenting seriously flawed interpretations of the past. In particular, Elton was opposed to the idea that the English Civil War was caused by socioeconomic changes in the 16th and 17th centuries, arguing instead that it was due largely to the incompetence of the Stuart kings.

Outside the Marxist orbit, social historians paid a good deal of attention to labour history as well.

Paul Addison notes that in Britain by the 1990s, labour history was "in sharp decline" because "there was no longer much interest in history of the white, male working-class. Instead the 'cultural turn' encouraged historians to explore wartime constructions of gender, race, citizenship and national identity."

=== Rostow's alternative to Marxism ===
In 1960, American economic historian Walt Whitman Rostow published The Stages of Economic Growth: A Non-Communist Manifesto, which proposed the Rostovian take-off model of economic growth, one of the major historical models of economic growth, which argues that economic modernisation occurs in five basic stages of varying length: traditional society, preconditions for take-off, take-off, drive to maturity, and high mass consumption. This became one of the important concepts in the theory of modernisation in social evolutionism. A product of its time and place, the book argued that one of the central problems of the Cold War as understood by American decision-makers, namely that there were millions of people living in poverty in the Third World whom Communism appealed to, could be solved by a policy of modernisation to be fostered by American economic aid and growth. Guy Ortolano argues that as an alternative to Marxist class-oriented analysis Rostow replaced class with nation as the agent of history. British history then became the base for comparisons. However Rostow never explicitly offered the British case as the ideal model for nations to copy. Many commentators assumed that was his goal and attention turned to issues of American exceptionalism, and the claim that Britain created the modern economy.

== Since 1945 ==
=== First World War ===
The First World War continues to be a theme of major interest to scholars, but the content has changed over time. The first studies focused on the military history of the war itself and reached a wide popular audience. With the publication of most of the critical diplomatic documents from all sides in the 1920s and 1930s, scholarly attention turned heavily toward the comparative diplomatic history of Britain, alongside France, Germany, Austria and Russia. In recent decades, attention has turned away from the generals and toward the common soldiers, and away from the Western front and toward the complex involvement in other regions, including the roles of the colonies and dominions of the British Empire. A great deal of attention is devoted to structure of the Army, and debates regarding the mistakes made by the high command typified by the popular slogan lions led by donkeys. Social history has brought in the home front, especially the roles of women and propaganda. Cultural studies have pointed to the memories and meanings of the war after 1918.

Thomas Colley finds that informed Britons in the 21st century are in agreement that Britain has very often been at war over the centuries. They also agree that the nation has steadily lost its military prowess due to declines in its economy and disappearance of its empire.

=== Prominent historians ===
==== Arnold Toynbee ====
Arnold J. Toynbee (1889–1975) had two careers, one focused on chronicling and analyzing 20th century diplomatic history. However he became famous for his sweeping interpretation of world history, with a strong religious bent, in his 12-volume A Study of History (1934–1961). With his prodigious output of papers, articles, speeches and presentations, and numerous books translated into many languages, Toynbee was a widely read and discussed scholar in the 1940s and 1950s. Professional historians never paid much heed to the second Toynbee, however, and he lost his popular audience as well.

==== Keith Feiling ====
Keith Feiling (1884–1977) was Chichele Professor of Modern History at Oxford, 1946–1950. He was noted for his conservative interpretation of the past, showing an empire-oriented ideology in defence of hierarchical authority, paternalism, deference, the monarchy, Church, family, nation, status and place. A Tory Democrat, he felt that conservatives possessed more character than other people, as he tried to demonstrate in his books on the history of the Conservative Party. He acknowledged the necessity of reform—as long as it was gradual, top-down, and grounded not in abstract theory but in an appreciation of English history. Thus he celebrated the reforms of the 1830s. A.J.P. Taylor in 1950 praised Feiling's historiography, calling it "Toryism" in contrast to the more common "Whig history", or liberal historiography, written to show the inevitable progress of mankind. Taylor explains, "Toryism rests on doubt in human nature; it distrusts improvement, clings to traditional institutions, prefers the past to the future. It is a sentiment rather than a principle."

==== Isaiah Berlin ====
Isaiah Berlin (1909–1997) was a highly respected essayist who explored ideas and philosophy.

==== A. J. P. Taylor ====
A. J. P. Taylor (1906–1990) is best known for his highly controversial reinterpretation of the coming of the Origins of the Second World War (1961). He ranged widely over the 19th and 20th centuries. Of major importance are his rich treatises surveying European diplomatic history, The Struggle for Mastery in Europe, 1848–1918 (Oxford University Press, 1955), and 20th century Britain, English History 1914–1945 (Oxford University Press, 1965). As a commentator in print and on the air he became well known to millions through his television lectures. His combination of academic rigour and popular appeal led the historian Richard Overy to describe him as "the Macaulay of our age".

Despite Taylor's increasing ambivalence toward appeasement from the late 1950s, which became explicitly evident in his 1961 book Origins of the Second World War, Winston Churchill remained another of his heroes. In English History 1914–1945, Taylor famously concluded his biographical footnote of Churchill with the phrase "the saviour of his country". Another person Taylor admired was the historian E. H. Carr, who was his favourite historian and a good friend.

==== Hugh Trevor-Roper ====
Hugh Trevor-Roper (1914–2003) was a leading essayist and commentator. He thrived on polemics and debates, covering a wide range of historical topics, but particularly England in the 16th and 17th centuries and Nazi Germany. His essays established his reputation as a scholar who could succinctly define historiographical controversies. In the view of John Kenyon, "some of [Trevor-Roper's] short essays have affected the way we think about the past more than other men's books". On the other hand, his biographer claims that "the mark of a great historian is that he writes great books, on the subject which he has made his own. By this exacting standard Hugh failed."

=== Political history ===
Political history has flourished in terms both of biography of major national leaders, and the history of political parties.

==== Postwar consensus ====
The post-war consensus is a historians' model of political agreement from 1945 to 1979, when new Prime Minister, Margaret Thatcher, rejected and reversed it. The concept claims there was a widespread consensus that covered support for a coherent package of policies that were developed in the 1930s and promised during the Second World War, focused on a mixed economy, Keynesianism and a broad welfare state. In recent years the validity of the interpretation has been debated by historians.

The historians' model of the postwar consensus was most fully developed by Paul Addison. The basic argument is that in the 1930s Liberal Party intellectuals led by John Maynard Keynes and William Beveridge developed a series of plans that became especially attractive as the wartime government promised a much better postwar Britain and saw the need to engage every class in society. The coalition government during the war, headed by Churchill and Attlee, adopted white papers that promised Britain a much improved welfare state after the war. The promises included the national health service and expansion of education, housing and a number of welfare programs, as well as the nationalisation of some weak industries. It was extended to foreign policy in terms of decolonisation as well as support for the Cold War.

The model states that from 1945 until the arrival of Thatcher in 1979, there was a broad multi-partisan national consensus on social and economic policy, especially regarding the welfare state, nationalised health services, educational reform, a mixed economy, government regulation, Keynesian macroeconomic policies and full employment. Apart from the question of nationalisation of some industries, these policies were broadly accepted by the three major parties, as well as by industry, the financial community and the labour movement. Until the 1980s, historians generally agreed on the existence and importance of the consensus. Some historians, such as Ralph Miliband, expressed disappointment that the consensus was a modest or even conservative package that blocked a fully socialised society. The historian Angus Calder complained that the postwar reforms were an inadequate reward for the wartime sacrifices, a cynical betrayal of the people's hope for a more just postwar society. In recent years, there has been a historiographical debate on whether such a consensus ever existed. The revisionist argument is that the "consensus" was superficial because the parties were divided. The Conservatives clung to their pro-business ideals while Labour never renounced socialism.

=== Business history ===
Business history in Britain emerged in the 1950s following the publication of a series of influential company histories and the establishment of the journal Business History in 1958 at the University of Liverpool. The most influential of these early company histories was Charles Wilson's History of Unilever, the first volume of which was published in 1954. Other examples included Coleman's work on Courtaulds and artificial fibres, Alford on Wills and the tobacco industry, and Barker on Pilkington's and glass manufacture. These early studies were conducted primarily by economic historians interested in the role of leading firms in the development of the wider industry, and therefore went beyond mere corporate histories. Although some work examined the successful industries of the industrial revolution and the role of the key entrepreneurs, in the 1970s scholarly debate in British business history became increasingly focused on economic decline. For economic historians, the loss of British competitive advantage after 1870 could at least in part be explained by entrepreneurial failure, prompting further business history research into individual industry and corporate cases. The Lancashire cotton textile industry, which had been the leading take-off sector in the industrial revolution, but which was slow to invest in subsequent technical developments, became an important topic of debate on this subject. William Lazonick, for example, argued that cotton textile entrepreneurs in Britain failed to develop larger integrated plants on the American model; a conclusion similar to Chandler's synthesis of a number of comparative case studies.

Studies of British business leaders have emphasised how they fit into the class structure, especially their relationship to the aristocracy, and the desire to use their wealth to purchase landed estates and hereditary titles. Biography has been of less importance in British business history, but there are compilations. British business history began to widen its scope in the 1980s, with research work conducted at the LSE's Business History Unit, led first by Leslie Hannah, then by Terry Gourvish. Other research centres followed, notably at Glasgow and Reading, reflecting an increasing involvement in the discipline by Business and Management School academics. More recent editors of Business History, Geoffrey Jones (academic) (Harvard Business School), Charles Harvey (University of Newcastle Business School), John Wilson (Liverpool University Management School) and Steven Toms (Leeds University Business School), have promoted management strategy themes such as networks, family capitalism, corporate governance, human resource management, marketing and brands, and multi-national organisations in their international as well as merely British context. Employing these new themes has allowed business historians to challenge and adapt the earlier conclusions of Chandler and others about the performance of the British economy.

=== Urban history ===
In the 1960s, the academic historiography of the Victorian towns and cities began to flourish in Britain. Much of the attention focused at first on the Victorian city, with topics including demography, public health, the working class and local culture. In recent decades topics regarding class, capitalism and social structure have given way to studies of the cultural history of urban life, as well as groups such as women, prostitutes, migrants from rural areas and immigrants from the Continent and from the British Empire. The urban environment itself became a major topic, as studies of the material fabric of the city and the structure of urban space became more prominent.

Some historians have always made London the focus. For example, recent studies of early modern London cover a wide range of topics, including literary and cultural activities, the character of religious life in post-Reformation London; the importance of place and space to the experience of the city; and the question of civic and business morality in an urban environment without the oversight typical of villages.

Academics have increasingly studied smaller towns and cities since the medieval period, as well as the urbanisation that attended the industrial revolution. The historiography on the politics of 18th-century urban England shows the critical role played by towns in politics (where they comprised four-fifths of the seats in the House of Commons), as well as the political dominance of London. The studies also show how townspeople promoted social change at the same time as securing long-term political stability.

In the second half of the 19th century, provincial centres such as Birmingham, Glasgow, Leeds, Liverpool and Manchester doubled in size, becoming regional capitals. They were all conurbations that included smaller cities and suburbs in their catchment area. The available scholarly materials are now quite comprehensive. In 2000, Peter Clark of the Urban History Centre of the University of Leicester was the general editor (and Cambridge University Press the publisher) of a 2800-page history of British cities and towns in 75 chapters by 90 scholars. The chapters deal not with biographies of individual cities, but with economic, social or political themes that cities had in common.

==== Deindustrialisation ====
The theme of deindustrialisation has begun to attract the attention of historians. The first wave of scholarship came from activists who were involved in community activism at the time the factories and mines were shutting down the 1970s and 1980s. The cultural turn focused attention on the meaning of deindustrialisation in the 2000s. A third wave of scholars look at the socio-cultural aspects of how working-class culture changed in the post-industrial age. Historians broadened their scope from the economic causes of decline and resistance to job loss, to its social and cultural long-term effects.

=== New themes ===
==== Women's history ====
Women's history started to emerge in the 1970s against the passive resistance of many established men who had long dismissed it as frivolous, trivial, and "outside the boundaries of history". That sentiment persisted for decades in Oxbridge, but has largely faded in the red bricks and newer universities.

==== History of Parliament ====
In 1951 scholars receive national funding for a collaborative "History of Parliament". An editorial board comprised leading scholars, most notably Sir John Neale and Sir Lewis Namier. Years of energetic research demonstrated a commitment to the new technique of "prosopography", or quantitative collective biography. However, Neale and Namier had sharply different interpretations of the project. Neale looked for definitive quantitative answers to specific technical questions, of the sort suggested by his traditional whiggish view of constitutional development. Namier, on the other hand, took a sociological approach to use the lives of MPs as an entry point to recreate the world of the governing classes. The editorial board was unable to synthesise the two approaches. Namier's team moved faster through the documents, so much of the work followed his model. The Conservative government entered the debate, led by Harold Macmillan and civil servants who wanted a finished product rather than a never-ending project. Namier's ambition was curtailed and, after his death in 1960, his own section was completed by his assistant, John Brooke, in a more restricted format.

==== History of the state ====
The history of the state has been conceptualised first as a history of the ruling monarchs, and under Namier the study of individual personalities. Recently there has been a deeper exploration of the growth of state power. Historians have looked at the long 18th century, from about 1660 to 1837, from four fresh perspectives. The first, developed by Oliver MacDonagh, presented an expansive and centralised administrative state while deemphasizing the influence of Benthamite utilitarianism. The second approach, as developed by Edward Higgs, conceptualises the state as an information-gathering entity, paying special attention to local registrars and the census. He brings in such topics as spies, surveillance of Catholics, the 1605 Gunpowder Plot led by Guy Fawkes to overthrow the government, and the Poor Laws, and demonstrates similarities to the surveillance society of the 21st century. John Brewer introduced the third approach with his depiction of the unexpectedly powerful, centralised 'fiscal-military' state during the eighteenth century. Finally, there have been numerous recent studies that explore the state as an abstract entity capable of commanding the loyalties of those people over whom it rules.

==== Global history ====
James Vernon proposes a global history of Britain centred on the rise, demise and reinvention of a liberal political economy that made the market as the central principle of government. The story features the growth and collapse of the First and Second British Empires, as well as the global hegemony of the Anglosphere. Events, processes and peoples far beyond the Anglosphere shaped the history of its rise, demise and reinvention. This history of Britain is then a global story, not because of that old imperial conceit that Britain made the global map so red, but because the entire world combined to make Britain. To some extent the enterprise is already underway, making the Empire's history a central part of a new global history. New maps were drawn around the oceans, yielding new perspectives such as "Atlantic history".

=== Digital history ===
Digital history is opening new avenues for research into original sources that were very hard to handle before. One model is the Eighteenth Century Devon project, completed in 2007. It was a collaboration of professional historians, local volunteers, and professional archives that created an online collection of transcripts of 18th-century documents, such as allegiance rolls, Episcopal visitation returns, and freeholder lists. Digital archives and digital periodicals are allowing much broader opportunity for research and primary sources at the undergraduate level. Use of powerful search engines on large textual databases allows much more expanded research on such sources as newspaper files.

== See also ==
- Cambridge School of historiography led by John Gallagher and Ronald Robinson
- Economic history of the United Kingdom
- Historians of England in the Middle Ages
- Historiography of the British Empire
- Historiography of the Poor Laws
- Historiography of the causes of World War I
- Historiography of Scotland
- History of Christianity in Britain
- History of England
- History of Northern Ireland
- History of Scotland
- History of Wales
- List of Cornish historians
- Military history of the United Kingdom
- Politics of the United Kingdom

Timeline of British diplomatic history

- Timeline of Irish history
- Timeline of Scottish history

=== Special topics ===
- James Callaghan#Historiography, prime minister 1976-79

=== Prominent historians ===
- Lord Acton (1834–1902), editor
- Robert C. Allen (born 1947), economic
- Perry Anderson (born 1938), Marxism
- Karen Armstrong (born 1944), religious
- William Ashley (1860–1927), British economic history
- Bernard Bailyn (born 1922), Atlantic migration
- The Venerable Bede (672–735), Britain from 55 BC to 731 AD
- Brian Bond (born 1936), military
- Arthur Bryant (1899–1985), Pepys; popular military
- Herbert Butterfield (1900–1979), historiography
- Angus Calder (1942–2008), Second World War
- E. H. Carr (1892–1982), Soviet Russia
- I. R. Christie (1919–1998), 18th century
- Winston Churchill (1874–1965), world wars
- J. C. D. Clark (born 1951), 18th century
- Linda Colley (born 1949), 18th century
- R. G. Collingwood (1889–1943), philosophy of history
- Patrick Collinson (born 1929), Elizabethan England and Puritanism
- Julian Corbett (1854–1922), naval
- Maurice Cowling (1926–2005), 19th and 20th century politics
- Susan Doran, Elizabethan
- David C. Douglas (1898–1982), Norman England
- Eamon Duffy, religious history of the 15th–17th centuries
- Harold James Dyos (1921–78), urban
- Geoffrey Rudolph Elton, Tudor period
- Charles Harding Firth (1857–1936), political history of the 17th century
- Judith Flanders (born 1959), Victorian social
- Amanda Foreman (born 1968), 18th–19th centuries; Women
- Antonia Fraser, 17th century
- Edward Augustus Freeman (1823–1892), English politics
- James Anthony Froude (1818–1894), Tudor England
- William Gibson, ecclesiastical history
- Samuel Rawson Gardiner (1829–1902), political history of the 17th century
- Geoffrey of Monmouth (died c. 1154), England
- Lawrence Henry Gipson (1882–1970), British Empire before 1775
- George Peabody Gooch (1873–1968), modern diplomacy
- Andrew Gordon, naval
- John Richard Green (1837–1883), English
- Mary Anne Everett Green (1818–1895)
- John Guy (born 1949), Tudor era
- Edward Hasted (1732–1812), Kent
- Max Hastings (born 1945), military, Second World War
- J. H. Hexter, 17th century; historiography
- Christopher Hill (1912–2003), 17th century
- Gertrude Himmelfarb (born 1924), Victorian
- Harry Hinsley (1918–1998), British intelligence, World War 2
- Eric Hobsbawn (1917–2012), Marxist; 19th–20th centuries
- David Hume (1711–1776), six volume History of England
- Edward Hyde, 1st Earl of Clarendon (1609–1674), English Civil Wars
- William James, Royal Navy during the Napoleonic Wars
- George Hilton Jones III (1924–2008)
- David S. Katz, religious
- R. J. B. Knight (born 1944), naval
- David Knowles (1896–1974), medieval
- Andrew Lambert (born 1956), naval
- John Lingard (1771–1851), survey from Catholic perspective
- John Edward Lloyd (1861–1947), early Welsh history
- David Loades (born 1934), Tudor era
- Thomas Babington Macaulay, 1st Baron Macaulay (1800–1859), The History of England from the Accession of James the Second
- Piers Mackesy (born 1924), military
- J. D. Mackie (1887–1978), Scottish
- Frederic William Maitland (1850–1906), legal, medieval
- Arthur Marder (1910–1980), 20th century naval
- Kenneth O. Morgan (born 1934), Wales; politics since 1945
- Lewis Namier, political history of the 18th century
- Charles Oman (1860–1946), 19th century military
- Bradford Perkins (1925–2008), diplomacy with U.S.
- J. H. Plumb (1911–2001), 18th century
- J. G. A. Pocock (born 1924), political ideas; early modern
- Roy Porter (1946–2002), social and medical
- F. M. Powicke (1879–1963), English medieval
- Andrew Roberts, Political biographies, 19th and 20th centuries
- N. A. M. Rodger, naval
- Stephen Roskill, naval
- A. L. Rowse (1903–1997), Cornish history and Elizabethan
- Conrad Russell, 17th century
- Dominic Sandbrook (born 1974), 1960s and after
- John Robert Seeley (1834–1895), political history; Empire
- Simon Schama (born 1945), surveys
- Jack Simmons (1915–2000), railways, topography
- Quentin Skinner, early modern political ideas
- Goldwin Smith (1823–1910), British and Canadian
- Richard Southern (1912–2001), medieval
- David Starkey (born 1945), Tudor era
- Frank Stenton (1880–1967), English medieval
- Lawrence Stone, society and the history of the family
- William Stubbs (1825–1902), law
- A. J. P. Taylor (1906–1990), 19th century diplomacy; 20th century; historiography
- E. P. Thompson (1924–1993), working class
- A. Wyatt Tilby (1880–1948), British diaspora
- George Macaulay Trevelyan (1876–1962), English history (many different periods)
- Hugh Trevor-Roper, Baron Dacre of Glanton, 17th century
- Walter Ullmann (1910–1983), medieval
- Paul Vinogradoff (1854–1925), medieval
- Charles Webster (1886–1961), Diplomatic
- Retha Warnicke (born 1939), Tudor history and gender issues
- Cicely Veronica Wedgwood (1910–1997), British
- Ernest Llewellyn Woodward (1890–1971), international relations
- Perez Zagorin (born 1920), 16th and 17th centuries

== Scholarly journals ==
- Agricultural History Review
- Anglican & Episcopal History
- Anglo-Saxon England (journal)
- Albion
- British Catholic History
- The British Journal for the History of Science
- Britain and the World, formerly British Scholar
- Business History Review
- Cambridge Historical Journal
- Contemporary British History
- The Economic History Review
- English Historical Review
- First World War Studies
- The Historical Journal
- History of Education: Journal of the History of Education Society
- History Today, popular
- History Workshop Journal
- Notes and Records of the Royal Society, history of science
- Past & Present
- Journal of British Studies
- Journal of Scottish Historical Studies, formerly Scottish Economic and Social History
- Studia Hibernica
- The Scottish Historical Review
- Transactions of the Royal Historical Society
- Twentieth Century British History
- Urban History
- Victorian Studies

== Organisations ==
- British Association for Local History
- Centre for Contemporary British History
- Centre for Metropolitan History
- Dictionary of National Biography
- Economic History Society
- Federation of Family History Societies
- Historical Association
- Historical Manuscripts Commission
- History of Parliament
- Institute of Historical Research
- Oral History Society
- Royal Historical Society
- Society of Antiquaries of London
- Society of Genealogists
- Victoria County History
