= Tilby =

Tilby is an English surname. It was first found in Essex at Tilbury, a town in the borough of Thurrock.

== People ==
Notable people with the surname include:

- Angela Tilby (born 1950), English author and Anglican priest
- Trish Tilby, American fictional cartoon character
- Wendy Tilby (born 1960), Canadian animator
- A. Wyatt Tilby (1880–1948), English author, journalist and traveller
