= Storm over the gentry =

Historiographical debate regarding English Civil War

The Storm over the gentry was a major historiographical debate in the 1940s and 1950s among scholars over the role of the gentry in causing the English Civil War of 1642 to 1651. (The British gentry comprised the rich landowners who were not members of the titled nobility.)

Economic historian R.H. Tawney had suggested in 1941 that there was a major economic crisis for the nobility in the 16th and 17th centuries and that the rapidly-rising gentry class was demanding a share of power. When the aristocracy resisted, Tawney argued, the gentry launched the civil war.

Lawrence Stone, in a 1948 article, made an effort to use statistical data and methods to prove Tawney's thesis. However, Stone's argument was marred by methodological mistakes, and he came under heavy attack from Hugh Trevor-Roper and others. Trevor-Roper argued that the gentry was declining and so tried to improve its fortune through the law or through court office. Christopher Thompson, for example, showed that the peerage's real income was higher in 1602 than in 1534 and grew substantially by 1641. Many other scholars entered the fray and produced many studies concerning related questions.

In 1961 American scholar J. H. Hexter developed a quite widely-accepted view that largely ended the debate by maintaining that neither a rise nor a decline of the gentry could explain the Civil War; he claimed that such theories could explain only a "deliberate revolution", which did not take place.

== See also ==
- Historiography of the United Kingdom
- Stuart period
