= Ian Borthwick Cowan =

Scottish historian

Ian Borthwick Cowan (16 April 1932 – 22 December 1990) was a Scottish historian.

== Life ==
He was educated at Dumfries Academy and the University of Edinburgh, where he studied history. He was a member of the University's Conservative Club and took part in its debates. In his last year he studied under Gordon Donaldson and received a second class honours degree, along with the Kirkpatrick Prize for the most distinguished history graduate.

He performed his national service in the Royal Air Force, where he became a flying officer. In 1956 he returned to the history department as an assistant before being appointed history lecturer at Newbattle Abbey College in 1959. He received his PhD in 1961. In 1970 he was appointed to the University of Glasgow as senior lecturer, in 1977 to reader and in 1983 he became titular professor.

From 1972 until 1974 he was president of the Scottish Church History Society and from 1983 until 1988 he was editor of the Scottish Historical Review.

== Works ==
- The Enigma of Mary Stuart (Littlehampton Book Services, 1972). ISBN 0575006749
- The Scottish Covenanters, 1660-88 (Littlehampton Book Services, 1976). ISBN 0575021055
- The Scottish Reformation: Church and Society in Sixteenth-century Scotland (Littlehampton Book Services, 1982). ISBN 0297780298
- Medieval Religious Houses Scotland Second Edition (Longman, 1976). ISBN 0582120691
