= George B. Cooper (historian) =

American historian

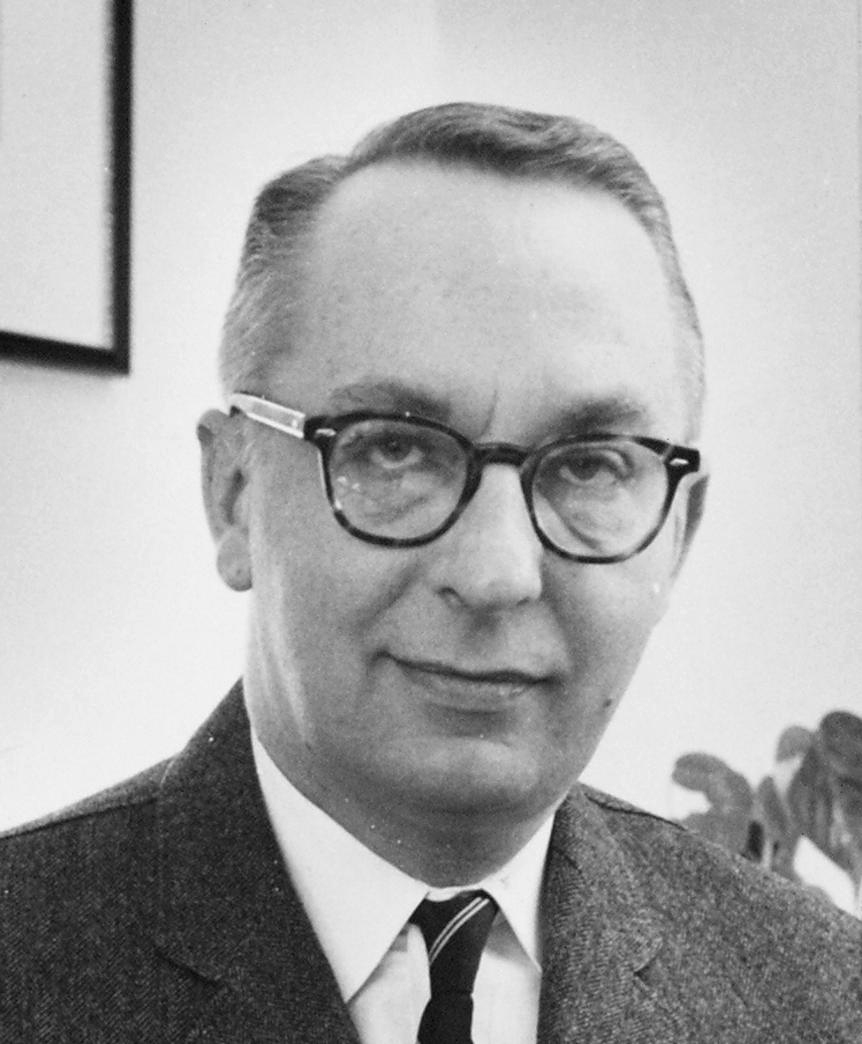
- Courtesy of Trinity College Archives, Trinity College, Hartford, Connecticut.
- Born: George Brinton Cooper; April 14, 1916; Philadelphia
- Died: October 18, 1995 (aged 79)
- Parent(s): Lloyd and Esther Cooper

George Brinton Cooper (14 April 1916 – 18 October 1995) was an American historian of British history and professor at Trinity College in Connecticut. Cooper co-founded the Journal of British Studies in 1961, and served as its managing editor for 18 years.

Born in Philadelphia to Lloyd and Esther Cooper, he received his B.A. from Swarthmore College in 1938 and received his M.A. and doctorate from Yale. He also studied as a Lockwood Fellow at the University College of London. Cooper served with United States Naval Intelligence and worked for the State Department during World War II. He taught for 38 years at Trinity, where he was renowned as a lecturer.

Before his retirement, Cooper was awarded an honorary doctorate from Trinity, which also created the post of Secretary of the college in recognition of his achievements. He chaired the Cesare Barbieri Endowment for Italian Culture at Trinity, directed or served on the boards of numerous New England libraries, and was occasionally active in Hartford politics, serving as a member of Hartford's Board of Education from 1959 to 1965, and its president from 1961 to 1963. Cooper was a member of the Colonial Society of Boston, the Sloane Club of London, the Grolier Club of New York City, and Hartford's Twilight and Monday Evening Clubs.

Cooper was the author of the phrase, "In Great Britain things that are conventional become habitual, and things that are habitual become constitutional.'

== See also ==
- Journal of British Studies
