= Historiography of the Poor Laws =

Historiography of English Poor Laws

The Historiography of the Poor Laws can be said to have passed through three distinct phases. Early historiography was concerned with the deficiencies of the Old Poor Law system, later work can be characterized as an early attempt at revisionism before the writings of Mark Blaug present a truly revisionist analysis of the Poor Law system.

== Deficiencies of the Old Poor Law ==
Much of the early historiography of the poor law concerned the deficiencies of the Old Poor Law. One of the earliest academic attacks on outdoor relief was Joseph Townsend’s 1786 article “Dissertation on the Poor Laws” which criticized the Speenhamland system. Thomas Malthus was the leading intellectual critic of the Poor Law system. His famous work Essay on the Principle of Population contained one chapter dedicated to the Poor Law, and many of his criticisms found their way into the Poor Law report of 1834, which overhauled the system

== Early revisionism ==
The first real challenge to the traditional interpretation of the Poor Law occurred in 1911 with the publication of John and Barbara Hammond's The Village Labourer and, later in 1927 the publication in Beatrice and Sydney Webb’s English Local Government. Hammonds argued the Speenhamland system was a response to the enclosure system of the 17th century. The Webbs made important contributions to the historiography of the Poor Law. They are considered to be the first to point out that outdoor relief to able bodied paupers became important prior to 1795 and they were the first historians to critique the 1834 Report. Another early revisionist analysis occurs in the work of Karl Polanyi who argues in The Great Transformation that the Speenhamland system was introduced to reinforce the “paternalistic system of labour organisation”

== Revisionism ==
The revisionist analysis of the Poor Law was first presented by Mark Blaug who in 1963 published the paper “The Myth of the Old Poor Law and the making of the New”. Blaug's analysis rejects the notion that outdoor relief had a disastrous effect on the rural labour market. He argues that outdoor relief increased labour productivity, a conclusion at odds with the authors of the 1834 report. The work of Daniel Baugh, who has analysed poor relief in Essex, Sussex and Kent between 1790 and 1834, extends Blaug’s critique.

== New Poor Law ==
There is also debate surrounding the passing of the Poor Law Amendment Act 1834. The Marxist interpretation of the New Poor Law is that the newly enfranchised middle-classes following the Reform Act 1832 (2 & 3 Will. 4. c. 45) were able to exploit the working classes by legislation which lowered workhouse conditions and made it more difficult to claim poor relief. The New Poor Law would also decrease the amount of tax being paid by the bourgeoisie. The working and pauper classes were still without the vote at this time and left powerless to oppose it. The workhouse system meant that the peasants and working class could be kept under strict control as opposed to the system of outdoor relief under the old poor law. It was feared that this system could lead to a rise against the ruling class as happened in the French Revolution. The traditionalist view is that there was more continuity with the previous system than change. Faced with unrest, the rich reasserted their control. A revisionist view fuses the above views and states the rich reasserted their control but through a capitalist system which was seen as exploitative of the working class.

The implementation of the Poor Law Amendment Act is also an area of debate. Rose argues that unions were able to evade the act and continue to offer outdoor relief. Williams points to figures showing the number of able bodied receiving outdoor relief decreasing and the construction of workhouses to conclude that outdoor relief had been abolished by 1850. Lees concludes that it was possible in some areas of the country to apply for outdoor relief after 1850.

== See also ==
- Historiography of the United Kingdom
