= Hugh Trevor-Roper =

English historian (1914–2003)

The Right Honourable The Lord Dacre of Glanton FBA
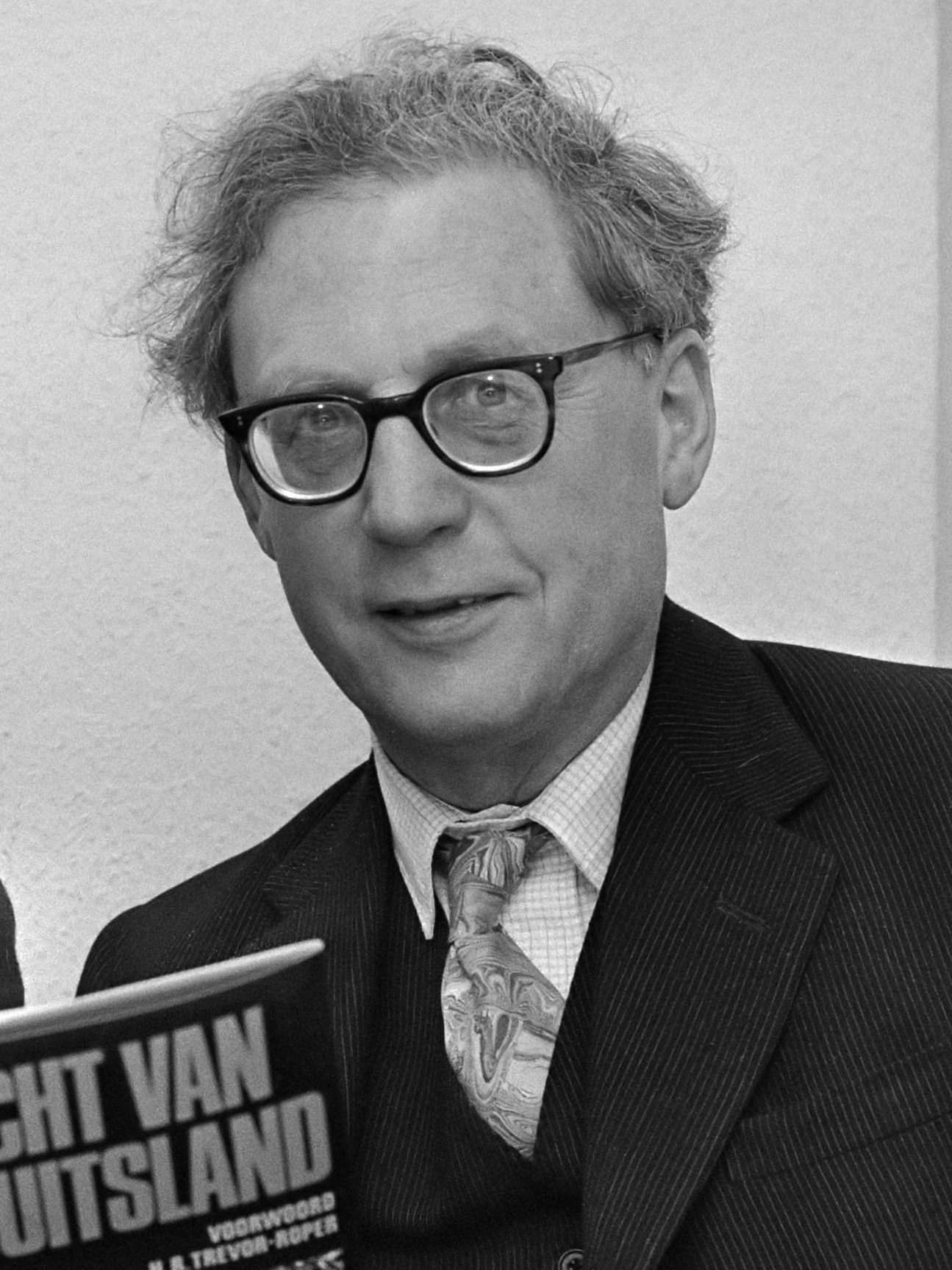
- Trevor-Roper in 1975
- Born: Hugh Redwald Trevor-Roper; 15 January 1914; Glanton, Northumberland, England
- Died: 26 January 2003 (aged 89); Oxford, Oxfordshire, England
- Education: Christ Church, Oxford
- Occupation: Historian
- Known for: Studies in 17th-century European history, Nazi Germany
- Title: Regius Professor of Modern History
- Term: 1957–1980
- Predecessor: Vivian Hunter Galbraith
- Successor: Michael Howard
- Spouse: Alexandra Howard-Johnston (m. 1954; died 1997)
- Relatives: Patrick Trevor-Roper (brother)
- Military career
- Allegiance: United Kingdom
- Branch: British Army
- Rank: Major
- Unit: Intelligence Corps
- Conflicts: World War II

Member of the House of Lords
- Lord Temporal
- Life peerage 27 September 1979 – 26 January 2003

Hugh Redwald Trevor-Roper, Baron Dacre of Glanton (15 January 1914 – 26 January 2003) was an English historian. He was Regius Professor of Modern History at the University of Oxford.

Trevor-Roper was a polemicist and essayist on a range of historical topics, but particularly England in the 16th and 17th centuries and Nazi Germany. According to John Philipps Kenyon, "some of [Trevor-Roper's] short essays have affected the way we think about the past more than other men's books". Richard Davenport-Hines and Adam Sisman wrote that "The bulk of his publications is formidable ... Some of his essays are of Victorian length. All of them reduce large subjects to their essence. Many of them ... have lastingly transformed their fields." Conversely, Sisman wrote: "the mark of a great historian is that he writes great books, on the subject which he has made his own. By this exacting standard Hugh failed."

In 1945, British intelligence tasked Trevor-Roper with ascertaining the facts about Adolf Hitler's death. From interviews with a range of witnesses and study of surviving documents, he concluded in The Last Days of Hitler (1947) that Hitler was dead and had not escaped Berlin.

In 1983, Trevor-Roper's reputation was "severely damaged" when he authenticated the Hitler Diaries shortly before they were shown to be forgeries.

== Early life and education ==
Trevor-Roper was born at Glanton, Northumberland, England, the son of Kathleen Elizabeth Davidson (died 1964) and Bertie William Edward Trevor-Roper (1885–1978), a doctor, descended from Henry Roper, 8th Baron Teynham and second husband of Anne, 16th Baroness Dacre. Trevor-Roper "enjoyed (but not too seriously) ... that he was a collateral descendant of William Roper, the son-in-law and biographer of Sir Thomas More ... as a boy he was aware that only a dozen lives (several of them those of elderly bachelors) separated him from inheriting the Teynham peerage."

Trevor-Roper's brother, Patrick, became a leading eye surgeon and gay rights activist. Trevor-Roper was educated at Belhaven Hill School, Charterhouse, and Christ Church, Oxford, where he read first Classics (Literae Humaniores) and then Modern History. He got a first-class degree in Classical Moderations in 1934 and won the Craven, the Ireland, and the Hertford scholarships in Classics. Initially, both he and his brother intended to make their careers in the Classics, but Hugh became bored with what he regarded as the pedantic technical aspects of the classics course at Oxford and switched to history, where he obtained first-class honours in 1936. Whilst at Oxford, he was a member of the exclusive Stubbs Society and was initiated as a Freemason in the Apollo University Lodge.

In 1937, he moved from Christ Church to Merton College, Oxford to become a research fellow. His first book was a 1940 biography of Archbishop William Laud, in which he challenged many of the prevailing perceptions surrounding Laud.

== Military service and the Second World War ==
Trevor-Roper was a member of the University of Oxford's Officer Training Corps, reaching the rank of officer cadet corporal. On 28 February 1939, he was commissioned in the British Army as a second lieutenant with seniority in that rank from 1 October 1938, and attached to the cavalry unit of the Oxford University Contingent of the OTC. On 15 July 1940, he was promoted to war substantive lieutenant and transferred to the Intelligence Corps, Territorial Army.

During the Second World War, he served as an officer in the Radio Security Service of the Secret Intelligence Service, and then on the interception of messages from the German intelligence service, the Abwehr. In early 1940, Trevor-Roper and E. W. B. Gill decrypted some of these intercepts, demonstrating the relevance of the material and spurring Bletchley Park efforts to decrypt the traffic. Intelligence from Abwehr traffic later played an important part in many operations including the Double-Cross System.

He formed a low opinion of most pre-war professional intelligence officers, but a higher one of some of the post-1939 recruits. In The Philby Affair (1968) Trevor-Roper argues that the Soviet spy Kim Philby was never in a position to undermine efforts by the chief of the Abwehr, German Military Intelligence, Admiral Wilhelm Canaris, to overthrow the Nazi regime and negotiate with the British government.

== Investigating Hitler's last days ==
In November 1945, Trevor-Roper was ordered by Dick White, then head of counter-intelligence in the British sector of Berlin, to investigate the circumstances of Adolf Hitler's death, and to rebut the Soviet propaganda that Hitler was alive and living in the West. Using the alias of "Major Oughton", Trevor-Roper interviewed or prepared questions for several officials, high and low, who had been present in the Führerbunker with Hitler, and who had been able to escape to the West, including Bernd Freytag von Loringhoven. Although he cites eyewitness accounts of the burning of Hitler's body, Trevor-Roper notes that bones are understood to withstand burning (science supported by subsequent studies).

For the most part Trevor-Roper relied on investigations and interviews by hundreds of British, American and Canadian intelligence officers. He did not have access to Soviet materials. Trevor-Roper's report served as the basis for his most famous book, The Last Days of Hitler, in which he reconstructs and discusses the events in the Führerbunker during the last ten days of Hitler's life.

The book was cleared by British officials in 1946 for publication as soon as the war crimes trials ended. It was published in English in 1947; six English editions and many foreign language editions followed. According to American journalist Ron Rosenbaum, Trevor-Roper received a letter from Lisbon written in Hebrew stating that the Stern Gang would assassinate him for The Last Days of Hitler, which, they believed, portrayed Hitler as a "demoniacal" figure but let ordinary Germans who followed Hitler off the hook, and that for this he deserved to die. Rosenbaum reports that Trevor-Roper told him this was the most extreme response he had ever received for one of his books.

Trevor-Roper also showed that Hitler's dictatorship was not an efficient unified machine but a hodge-podge of overlapping rivalries. With numerous editions, the book was Trevor-Roper's most commercially successful.

== Anti-communism ==
In June 1950, Trevor-Roper attended a conference in Berlin of anti-Communist intellectuals along with Sidney Hook, Melvin J. Lasky, Ignazio Silone, Arthur Koestler, Raymond Aron and Franz Borkenau that resulted in the founding of the CIA front group Congress for Cultural Freedom and its magazine Encounter. In the 1950s and 1960s, he was a frequent contributor to Encounter, but had reservations about what he regarded as the over-didactic tone of some of its contributors, particularly Koestler and Borkenau.

== Historical debates and controversies ==
Trevor-Roper was famous for his lucid and acerbic writing style. In reviews and essays he could be pitilessly sarcastic, and devastating in his mockery. In attacking Arnold J. Toynbee's A Study of History, for instance, Trevor-Roper accused Toynbee of regarding himself as a Messiah complete with "the youthful Temptations; the missionary Journeys; the Miracles; the Revelations; the Agony".

For Trevor-Roper, the major themes of early modern Europe were its intellectual vitality, and the quarrels between Protestant and Catholic states, the latter being outpaced by the former, economically and constitutionally. In Trevor-Roper's view, another theme of early modern Europe was expansion overseas in the form of colonies and intellectual expansion in the form of the Reformation and the Enlightenment. In Trevor-Roper's view, the witch hunts of the 16th and 17th centuries can ultimately be traced back to the conflict between the religious values of the Reformation and the rationalistic approach of what became the Enlightenment.

Trevor-Roper argued that history should be understood as an art, not a science and that the attribute of a successful historian was imagination. He viewed history as full of contingency, with the past neither a story of continuous advance nor of continuous decline but the consequence of choices made by individuals at the time. In his studies of early modern Europe, Trevor-Roper did not focus exclusively upon political history but sought to examine the interaction between the political, intellectual, social and religious trends.

His preferred medium of expression was the essay rather than the book. In his essays in social history, written during the 1950s and 1960s, Trevor-Roper was influenced by the work of the French Annales school, especially Fernand Braudel and did much to introduce the work of the Annales school to the English-speaking world. In the 1950s, Trevor-Roper wrote that Braudel and other Annalists were doing much innovative historical work but were "totally excluded from Oxford which remains, in historical matters, a retrograde provincial backwater".

=== English Civil War ===
In Trevor-Roper's opinion, the dispute between the Puritans and the Arminians was a major, although not the sole, cause of the English Civil War. For him, the dispute was over such issues as free will and predestination and the role of preaching versus the sacraments. Only later did the dispute become a matter of the structure of the Church of England. The Puritans desired a more decentralised and egalitarian church, with an emphasis on the laity, while the Arminians wished for an ordered church with a hierarchy, an emphasis on divine right and salvation through free will.

As a historian of early modern Britain, Trevor-Roper was known for his disputes with fellow historians such as Lawrence Stone and Christopher Hill, whose materialist, and in some measure "inevitablist", explanations of the English Civil War he attacked. Trevor-Roper was a leading player in the historiographical storm over the gentry, also known as the Gentry controversy, a dispute with the historians R. H. Tawney and Stone, about whether the English gentry were, economically, on the way down or up, in the century before the English Civil War and whether this helped cause that war.

Stone, Tawney and Hill argued that the gentry were rising economically and that this caused the Civil War. Trevor-Roper argued that while office-holders and lawyers were prospering, the lesser gentry were in decline. A third group of history men around J. H. Hexter and Geoffrey Elton, argued that the causes of the Civil War had nothing to do with the gentry. In 1948, a paper put forward by Stone in support of Tawney's thesis was vigorously attacked by Trevor-Roper, who showed that Stone had exaggerated the debt problems of the Tudor nobility. He also rejected Tawney's theories about the rising gentry and declining nobility, arguing that he was guilty of selective use of evidence and that he misunderstood the statistics.

=== World War II and Hitler ===
Trevor-Roper attacked the philosophies of history advanced by Arnold J. Toynbee and E. H. Carr, as well as his colleague A. J. P. Taylor's account of the origins of World War II. Another dispute was with Taylor and Alan Bullock over the question of whether Adolf Hitler had fixed aims. In the 1950s, Trevor-Roper was ferocious in his criticism of Bullock for his portrayal of Hitler as a "mountebank" instead of the ideologue Trevor-Roper believed him to be. When Taylor offered a picture of Hitler similar to Bullock's, in his 1961 book The Origins of the Second World War, the debate continued. Another feud was with the novelist and Catholic convert Evelyn Waugh, who was angered by Trevor-Roper's repeated harsh attacks on the Catholic Church.

In the globalist–continentalist debate between those who argued that Hitler aimed to conquer the world and those who argued that he sought only the conquest of Europe, Trevor-Roper was one of the leading continentalists. He argued that the globalist case sought to turn a scattering of Hitler's remarks made over decades into a plan. In his analysis, the only consistent objective Hitler sought was the domination of Europe, as laid out in Mein Kampf.

The American historian Lucy Dawidowicz in The Holocaust and Historians (1981) delivered what the British historian David Cesarani called an "ad hominem attack", writing that Trevor-Roper in his writings on Nazi Germany was indifferent to Nazi antisemitism, because she believed that he was a snobbish antisemite, who was apathetic about the murder of six million Jews. Cesarani wrote that Dawidowicz was wrong to accuse Trevor-Roper of antisemitism but argued that there was an element of truth to her critique in that the Shoah was a blind-spot for Trevor-Roper.

Trevor-Roper was a very firm "intentionalist" who treated Hitler as a serious, if slightly deranged thinker who, from 1924 until his death in 1945, was obsessed with "the conquest of Russia, the extermination of the Slavs, and the colonization of the English". In his 1962 essay "The Mind of Adolf Hitler", Trevor-Roper again criticized Bullock, writing "Even Mr. Bullock seems content to regard him as a diabolical adventurer animated solely by an unlimited lust for personal power ... Hitler was a systematic thinker and his mind is, to the historian, as important as the mind of Bismarck or Lenin". Trevor-Roper maintained that Hitler, on the basis of a wide range of antisemitic literature, from the writings of Houston Stewart Chamberlain to The Protocols of the Learned Elders of Zion, had constructed a racist ideology that called for making Germany the world's greatest power and the extermination of perceived enemies such as the Jews and Slavs.

Trevor-Roper wrote that the mind of Hitler was "a terrible phenomenon, imposing indeed in its granite harshness and yet infinitely squalid in its miscellaneous cumber, like some huge barbarian monolith; the expression of giant strength and savage genius; surrounded by a festering heap of refuse, old tins and vermin, ashes and eggshells and ordure, the intellectual detritus of centuries". Cesarani wrote that Trevor-Roper regarded Hitler, in marked contrast to Bullock, as a man who was serious about what he said but at the same time, Trevor-Roper's picture of Hitler as a somewhat insane leader, fanatically pursuing lunatic policies, meant paradoxically that it was hard to take Hitler seriously, at least on the basis of Trevor-Roper's writings.

Cesarani stated that Trevor-Roper was sincere in his hatred and contempt for the Nazis and everything they stood for but he had considerable difficulty when it came to writing about the complicity and involvement of traditional German elites in National Socialism, because the traditional elites in Germany were so similar in many ways to the British establishment, which Trevor-Roper identified with so strongly.

In this respect, Cesarani argued that it was very revealing that Trevor-Roper in The Last Days of Hitler was especially damning in his picture of the German Finance Minister, Count Lutz Schwerin von Krosigk, who Trevor-Roper noted "had been a Rhodes Scholar at Oxford, but he had acquired none of its values". Cesarani wrote "Thus, to Trevor-Roper the values of Oxford University stood at the opposite pole to those of Hitler's Reich, and one reason for the ghastly character of Nazism was that it did not share them". Cesarani noted that while Trevor-Roper supported the Conservatives and ended his days as a Tory life-peer, he was broadly speaking a liberal and believed that Britain was a great nation because of its liberalism.

Because of this background, Cesarani wrote that Trevor-Roper naturally saw the liberal democracy Britain as anathema to Nazi Germany. Cesarani concluded that "to maintain the illusion of virtuous British liberalism, Hitler had to be depicted as either a statesman like any other or a monster without equal, and those who did business with him as, respectively, pragmatists or dupes. Every current of Nazi society that made it distinctive could be charted, while the anti-Jewish racism that it shared with Britain was discreetly avoided".

=== General crisis of the 17th century ===
A notable thesis propagated by Trevor-Roper was the "general crisis of the 17th century". He argued that the middle years of the 17th century in Western Europe saw a widespread break-down in politics, economics and society caused by demographic, social, religious, economic and political problems. In this "general crisis", various events, such as the English Civil War; The Fronde in France; the climax of the Thirty Years' War in Germany; troubles in the Netherlands; and revolts against the Spanish Crown in Portugal, the Kingdom of Naples and Catalonia; were all manifestations of the same problems.

The most important causes of the "general crisis" in Trevor-Roper's opinion were conflicts between "Court" and "Country"; that is, between the increasingly powerful centralizing, bureaucratic, sovereign princely states, represented by the Court, and the traditional, regional, land-based aristocracy and gentry, representing the country. In addition, he said that the religious and intellectual changes introduced by the Reformation and the Renaissance were important secondary causes of the "general crisis".

The "general crisis" thesis generated controversy between supporters of this theory, and those, such as the Marxist historian Eric Hobsbawm, who agreed with him that there was a "general crisis", but saw the problems of 17th century Europe as more economic in origin than Trevor-Roper would allow. A third faction denied that there was any "general crisis", for example the Dutch historian Ivo Schöffer, the Danish historian Niels Steensgaard, and the Soviet historian A. D. Lublinskaya. Trevor-Roper's "general crisis" thesis provoked much discussion, and led experts in 17th century history such as Roland Mousnier, J. H. Elliott, Lawrence Stone, E. H. Kossmann, Eric Hobsbawm and J. H. Hexter to become advocates of the pros and cons of the theory.

At times the discussion became quite heated; the Italian Marxist historian Rosario Villari, speaking of the work of Trevor-Roper and Mousnier, claimed that: "The hypothesis of imbalance between bureaucratic expansion and the needs of the state is too vague to be plausible, and rests on inflated rhetoric, typical of a certain type of political conservative, rather than on effective analysis." Villari accused Trevor-Roper of downgrading the importance of what Villari called the English Revolution (the usual Marxist term for the English Civil War), and insisted that the "general crisis" was part of a Europe-wide revolutionary movement.

Another Marxist critic of Trevor-Roper, the Soviet historian A. D. Lublinskaya, attacked the concept of a conflict between "Court" and "Country" as fiction, arguing there was no "general crisis". Instead she maintained that the so-called "general crisis" was merely the emergence of capitalism.

=== First World War ===
In 1973, Trevor-Roper in the foreword to a book by John Röhl endorsed the view that Germany was largely responsible for the First World War. Trevor-Roper wrote that in his opinion far too many British historians had allowed themselves to be persuaded of the theory that the outbreak of war in 1914 had been the fault of all the great powers. He said that this theory had been promoted by the German government's policy of selective publication of documents, aided and abetted by most German historians in a policy of "self-censorship". He praised Röhl for finding and publishing two previously secret documents that showed German responsibility for the war.

=== JFK assassination ===
Trevor-Roper was critical of the official account of the assassination of John F. Kennedy. He voiced his scepticism of the Warren Commission, which concluded that a lone gunman by the name of Lee Harvey Oswald was responsible. In a 3,500-word essay published in The Sunday Times, he wrote that the commission employed a "smokescreen of often irrelevant material" and "accepted impermissible axioms, constructed invalid arguments, and failed to ask elementary and essential questions". He later appeared on a special episode of the BBC's television programme Encounter, hosted by Erskine B. Childers, to discuss the Warren Report. He penned the introduction to Mark Lane's book Rush to Judgment (1966) and was thanked in the acknowledgements section for being "kind enough to read the manuscript and make suggestions". He also joined Bertrand Russell's Who Killed Kennedy? Committee.

=== Backhouse frauds ===
In 1973, Trevor-Roper was invited to visit Switzerland to examine a manuscript entitled Décadence Mandchoue written by the sinologist Sir Edmund Backhouse (1873–1944) in a mixture of English, French, Latin and Chinese that had been in the custody of Reinhard Hoeppli, a Swiss diplomat who was the Swiss consul in Beijing during World War II. Hoeppli, given Décadence Mandchoue in 1943 by his friend Backhouse, had been unable to publish it owing to its sexually explicit content. But by 1973 looser censorship and the rise of the gay rights movement meant a publisher was willing to release Décadence Mandchoue to the market. However, before doing so they wanted Trevor-Roper, who as a former MI6 officer was an expert on clandestine affairs, to examine some of the more outlandish claims contained in the text.

For an example, Backhouse claimed in Décadence Mandchoue that the wives and daughters of British diplomats in Beijing had trained their dogs and tamed foxes to perform cunnilingus on them, which the fascistic Backhouse used as evidence of British "decadence", which explained why he was supporting Germany and Japan in the Second World War. Trevor-Roper regarded Décadence Mandchoue with considerable distaste calling the manuscript "pornographic" and "obscene" as Backhouse related in graphic detail sexual encounters he claimed to have had with the French poet Paul Verlaine, the Irish playwright Oscar Wilde, Wilde's lover Lord Alfred Douglas, the French poet Arthur Rimbaud, the Russian ballet dancer Vaslav Nijinsky, the British Prime Minister Lord Rosebery and the Empress Dowager Cixi of China whom the openly gay Backhouse had maintained had forced herself on him.

Backhouse also claimed to have been the friend of the Russian novelist Leo Tolstoy and the French actress Sarah Bernhardt. For the next two years, Trevor-Roper went on an odyssey that took him all over Britain, France, Switzerland, the United States, Canada and China as he sought to unravel the mystery of just who the elusive Backhouse was. Backhouse had between 1898 and his death in 1944 worked as a sinologist, the business agent for several British and American companies in China, a British spy, gun-runner and translator before ending his days in World War II China as a fascist and a Japanese collaborator who wished fervently for an Axis victory which would destroy Great Britain. Trevor-Roper noted that despite Backhouse's homosexuality and Nazi Germany's policy of persecuting homosexuals, Backhouse's intense hatred of his own country together with his sadistic-masochistic sexual needs meant that Backhouse longed to be "ravished and possessed by the brutal, but still perverted masculinity of the fascist Führerprinzip".

The result was one of Trevor-Roper's most successful later books, his 1976 biography of Backhouse, originally entitled A Hidden Life but soon republished in Britain and the US as The Hermit of Peking. Backhouse had long been regarded as a world's leading expert on China. In his biography, Trevor-Roper exposed the vast majority of Backhouse's life-story and virtually all of his scholarship as a fraud. In Décadence Mandchoue, Backhouse spoke of his efforts to raise money to pay the defence lawyers for Wilde while he was an undergraduate at Oxford.

Trevor-Roper established that while Backhouse raised money for the Wilde defence fund, he spent it all on buying expensive jewellery, especially pearl necklaces, which were a special passion of Backhouse's. It was this embezzlement of the money Backhouse had raised for the Wilde defence fund that led to him fleeing Britain in 1895. The discrediting of Backhouse as a source led to much of China's history being re-written in the West. Backhouse had portrayed Prince Ronglu as a friend of the West and an enemy of the Boxers when the opposite was true.

Trevor-Roper noted that in the "diary" of Ching-Shan, which Backhouse claimed to have looted from Ching's house just before it was burned down by Indian troops in the Boxer Rebellion, it has Prince Ronglu saying in French about the government's support of the Boxers: "It was worse than a crime; it was a blunder." Trevor-Roper argued that it was extremely unlikely that Prince Ronglu – who only knew Manchu and Mandarin – would be quoting a well-known French expression by Napoleon's chief of police, Fouché, but noted that Backhouse was fluent in French.

Backhouse was fluent in Mandarin and Cantonese, lived most of his life in Beijing and after moving to China had declined to wear western clothes, preferring instead the gown of a Chinese mandarin, which led most Westerners to assume that Backhouse "knew" China. Trevor-Roper noted that despite his superficial appearance of affection for the Chinese, much of what Backhouse wrote about on China worked subtly to confirm Western "Yellow Peril" stereotypes, as Backhouse variously depicted the Chinese as pathologically dishonest, sexually perverted, morally corrupt and generally devious and treacherous – in short, Chinese civilization for Backhouse was a deeply sick civilization.

Derek Sandhaus, however, notes that Trevor-Roper did not consult specialists in Chinese affairs, and alleges that he read only enough of the text to have been disgusted by its homosexuality. While conceding that Backhouse fabricated or imagined many of the purported assignations, others Sandhaus independently confirmed or found plausible, reasoning that Backhouse spoke Chinese, Manchu, and Mongolian (the languages of the imperial household), and that his account of the atmosphere and customs of the Empress Dowager's court may be more reliable than Trevor-Roper allowed.

=== Oxford activities ===
In 1960, Trevor-Roper waged a successful campaign against the candidacy of Sir Oliver Franks who was backed by the heads of houses marshalled by Maurice Bowra, for the Chancellorship of the University of Oxford, helping the Prime Minister Harold Macmillan to be elected instead. In 1964, Trevor-Roper edited a Festschrift in honour of his friend Sir Keith Feiling's 80th birthday. In 1970, he was the author of The Letters of Mercurius, a satirical work on the student revolts and university politics of the late 1960s, originally published as letters in The Spectator.

=== Debates on African history ===
Another aspect of Trevor-Roper's outlook on history and on scholarly research that has inspired controversy is his statement about the historical experiences of pre-literate societies. Following Voltaire's remarks on the fall of the Roman Empire at the hands of barbarian tribes, he asserted that Africa had no history prior to European exploration and colonisation. Trevor-Roper said "there is only the history of Europeans in Africa. The rest is darkness", its past "the unedifying gyrations of barbarous tribes in picturesque but irrelevant corners of the globe".

These comments, recapitulated in a later article which called Africa "unhistoric", spurred intense debate between historians, anthropologists, sociologists, in the emerging fields of postcolonial and cultural studies about the definition of "history". Historians have argued, in response, that historical myths of the kind perpetrated by Trevor-Roper need to be actively countered: "Only a process of counter-selection can correct this, and African historians have to concentrate on those aspects which were ignored by the disparaging mythologies".

Many historians now argue, against Trevor-Roper, that historical evidence should also include oral traditions as well as any type of written history, a former criterion for a society having left "prehistory". Critics of Trevor-Roper's claim have questioned the validity of systematic interpretations of the African past, whether by materialist, Annalist or the traditional historical methods used by Trevor-Roper. Some say approaches which compare Africa with Europe or directly integrate it into European history cannot qualify as accurate descriptions of African societies. Despite controversies over historical accuracy in oral records, as in Alex Haley's book Roots: The Saga of an American Family and the popular TV mini-series based on it, many historians believe that African griots, or oral memoirists, provide an historical oral record.

=== "Hitler Diaries" hoax ===
The nadir of his career came in 1983, when as a director of The Times, Trevor-Roper (by now Baron Dacre of Glanton) made statements that authenticated the so-called Hitler Diaries. Others were unsure: holocaust denier David Irving, for example, initially decried them as forgeries but subsequently changed his mind and declared that they could be genuine, before finally stating that they were a forgery. Historians Gerhard Weinberg and Eberhard Jäckel had also expressed doubt regarding the authenticity of the diaries.

Within two weeks, forensic scientist Julius Grant demonstrated that the diaries were forgeries. The ensuing fiasco gave Trevor-Roper's enemies the opportunity to criticise him openly, while Trevor-Roper's initial endorsement of the diaries raised questions about his integrity: The Sunday Times, a newspaper to which he regularly contributed book reviews and of which he was an independent director, had already paid a considerable sum for the right to serialise the diaries if and only if they were genuine.

Trevor-Roper explained that he had been given assurances (that turned out to be false) about how the diaries had come into the possession of their purported "discoverer", forger Konrad Kujau, and about the age of the paper and ink used in them and of their authenticity. Nonetheless, this incident prompted the satirical magazine Private Eye to nickname him "Hugh Very-Ropey", "Lord Lucre of Claptout", or more concisely, "Lord Facre".

Despite the shadow this cast over his later career, he continued to write and publish and his work remained well received.

== Election as Master of Peterhouse, Cambridge ==
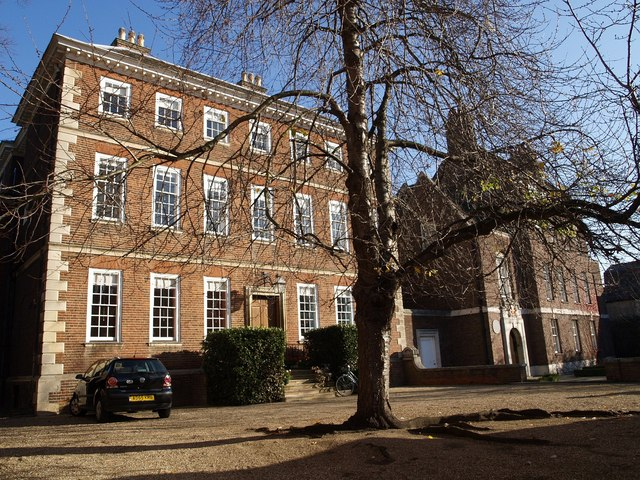
Peterhouse Master's Lodge

In 1980 at the age of 67, he became Master of Peterhouse, the oldest and smallest college in the University of Cambridge. His election, which surprised his friends, was engineered by a group of fellows led by Maurice Cowling, then the leading Peterhouse historian. The fellows chose him because Cowling's reactionary clique thought he would be an arch-conservative who would oppose the admission of women. In the event, Trevor-Roper feuded constantly with Cowling and his allies, while launching a series of administrative reforms. Women were admitted in 1983 at his urging. The British journalist Neal Ascherson summarised the quarrel between Cowling and Trevor-Roper as:

Lord Dacre, far from being a romantic Tory ultra, turned out to be an anti-clerical Whig with a preference for free speech over superstition. He did not find it normal that fellows should wear mourning on the anniversary of General Franco's death, attend parties in SS uniform or insult black and Jewish guests at high table. For the next seven years, Trevor-Roper battled to suppress the insurgency of the Cowling clique ("a strong mind trapped in its own glutinous frustrations"), and to bring the college back to a condition in which students might actually want to go there. Neither side won this struggle, which soon became a campaign to drive Trevor-Roper out of the college by grotesque rudeness and insubordination.

In a review of Adam Sisman's 2010 biography of Trevor-Roper, the Economist wrote that the picture of Peterhouse in the 1980s was "startling", stating the college had become under Cowling's influence a sort of right-wing "lunatic asylum", who were determined to sabotage Trevor-Roper's reforms. In 1987 he retired complaining of "seven wasted years".

== Festschrift ==
In 1981 a Festschrift was published in honour of Trevor-Roper, History and the Imagination. Some of the contributors were Sir Geoffrey Elton, John Clive, Arnaldo Momigliano, Frances Yates, Jeremy Catto, Robert S. Lopez, Michael Howard, David S. Katz, Dimitri Obolensky, J. H. Elliott, Richard Cobb, Walter Pagel, Hugh Lloyd-Jones, Valerie Pearl and Fernand Braudel. The topics contributed by this group of American, British, French, Russian, Italian, Israeli, Canadian and German historians extended from whether the Odyssey was a part of an oral tradition that was later written down, to the question of the responsibility for the Jameson Raid.

== Personal life ==
On 4 October 1954, Trevor-Roper married Lady Alexandra Henrietta Louisa Howard-Johnston (9 March 1907 – 15 August 1997), eldest daughter of Field Marshal The 1st Earl Haig by his wife, the former Hon. Dorothy Maud Vivian. Lady Alexandra was a goddaughter of Queen Alexandra and had previously been married to Rear-Admiral Clarence Dinsmore Howard-Johnston, by whom she had had three children. There were no children by his marriage with her.

Trevor-Roper was made a life peer in 1979 on the recommendation of Prime Minister Margaret Thatcher. He was raised to the peerage on 27 September 1979, and was introduced to the House of Lords as Baron Dacre of Glanton, of Glanton in the County of Northumberland. He did not base his title on his surname, because "double-barrelled titles are an invention, and a monopoly, of Wilsonian peers", and "under the rules of the College of Arms either ['Lord Trevor' or 'Lord Roper'] would require him to change his surname to either 'Trevor' or 'Roper'".

On mentioning the family's connection to the Dacre title to his wife, who liked the sound of it, Trevor-Roper was persuaded to opt for the title of "Baron Dacre", despite staunch opposition from the suo jure 27th Baroness Dacre (née Brand). She had her cousin, the 6th Viscount Hampden, "as titular head of the Brand family", inform Trevor-Roper that the Dacre title belonged to the Brand family "and no-one else should breach their monopoly", on the grounds of the title's antiquity of over six centuries.

This high-handed treatment strengthened Trevor-Roper's resolve in the face of his initial ambivalence. He observed "why should the Brands be so 'proud', or so jealous, of a mere title ... a gewgaw, which has been bandied intermittently from family to family for six centuries, without tradition or continuity or distinction (except for murder, litigation and extravagance) or, for the last 250 years, land? They only acquired this pretty toy, in 1829, because a Mr Brand, of whom nothing whatever is known, had married into the Trevor-Ropers, who had themselves acquired it by marrying into the Lennards. Now they behave as if they had owned it for six centuries and had a monopoly of it for ever. A fig for their stuffiness!" Notwithstanding objections, Trevor-Roper duly took the title of Baron Dacre of Glanton.

In his last years he had suffered from failing eyesight, which made it difficult for him to read and write. He underwent cataract surgery and obtained a magnifying machine, which allowed him to continue writing. In 2002, at the age of 88, Trevor-Roper submitted a sizable article on Thomas Sutton, the founder of Charterhouse School, to the Oxford Dictionary of National Biography in part with notes he had written decades earlier, which editor Brian Harrison praised as "the work of a master". Trevor-Roper suffered several other minor ailments related to his advanced age, but according to his stepson, "bore all his difficulties stoically and without complaint". In 2002, he was diagnosed with cancer. He died on 26 January 2003 in a hospice in Oxford, aged 89.

== Posthumous books ==
Five books by Trevor-Roper were published posthumously. The first was Letters from Oxford, a collection of letters written by Trevor-Roper between 1947 and 1959 to his close friend the American art historian and collector Bernard Berenson. The second book was 2006's Europe's Physician, a biography of Sir Theodore de Mayerne, the Franco-Swiss court physician to Henri IV, James I and Charles I. The latter work was largely completed by 1979, but for unknown reasons was not finished.

The third book was The Invention of Scotland: Myth and History, a critique written in the mid-1970s of what Trevor-Roper regarded as the myths of Scottish nationalism. It was published in 2008. The fourth book collecting together some of his essays on History and the Enlightenment: Eighteenth Century Essays was published in 2010. The fifth book was The Wartime Journals, edited by Richard Davenport-Hines, published in 2011. The Wartime Journals are from the journals that Trevor-Roper kept during his years in the Secret Intelligence Service.

== Works ==
- Archbishop Laud, 1573–1645, 1940.
- The Last Days of Hitler, 1947 (revised editions followed, until the last in 1995)
- "The Elizabethan Aristocracy: An Anatomy Anatomized", Economic History Review (1951) 3 No 3 pp. 279–98 JSTOR 2599988
- Secret Conversations, 1941–1944 (published later as Hitler's Table Talk, 1941–1944), 1953.
- Historical Essays, 1957 (published in the United States in 1958 as Men and Events).
- "The General Crisis of the Seventeenth Century", Past and Present, Volume 16, 1959 pp. 31–64.
- "Hitlers Kriegsziele", in Vierteljahrshefte für Zeitsgeschichte, Volume 8, 1960 pp. 121–33, translated into English as "Hitler's War Aims" pp. 235–50 from Aspects of the Third Reich edited by H. W. Koch, London: Macmillan, 1985.
- "A. J. P. Taylor, Hitler and the War", Encounter, Volume 17, July 1961 pp. 86–96.
- "E. H. Carr's Success Story", Encounter, Volume 84, Issue No 104, 1962 pp. 69–77.
- Blitzkrieg to Defeat: Hitler's War Directives, 1939–1945, 1964, 1965.
- Essays in British history presented to Sir Keith Feiling, edited by H.bR. Trevor-Roper; with a foreword by Lord David Cecil (1964)
- The Rise of Christian Europe (History of European Civilization series), 1965.
- Hitler's Place in History, 1965.
- The Crisis of the Seventeenth Century: Religion, the Reformation, and Social Change, and Other Essays, 1967.
- The Age of Expansion, Europe and the World, 1559–1600, edited by Hugh Trevor-Roper, 1968.
- The Philby Affair: Espionage, Treason and Secret Services, 1968.
- The Romantic Movement and the Study of History: the John Coffin memorial lecture delivered before the University of London on 17 February 1969, 1969.
- The European Witch-Craze of the Sixteenth and Seventeenth Centuries, 1969
- The Plunder of the Arts in the Seventeenth Century, 1970.
- The Letters of Mercurius, 1970. (London: John Murray)
- Queen Elizabeth's First Historian: William Camden and the Beginning of English "Civil History", 1971.
- "Fernand Braudel, the Annales, and the Mediterranean", The Journal of Modern History Vol. 44, No. 4, December 1972
- "Foreword" pp. 9–16 from 1914: Delusion or Design The Testimony of Two German Diplomats edited by John Röhl, 1973.
- A Hidden Life: The Enigma of Sir Edmund Backhouse (published in the US, and in later Eland editions in the UK, as The Hermit of Peking: The Hidden Life of Sir Edmund Backhouse), 1976.
- Princes and Artists: Patronage and Ideology at Four Habsburg Courts, 1517–1633, 1976.
- History and Imagination: A Valedictory Lecture Delivered before the University of Oxford on 20 May 1980, 1980.
- Renaissance Essays, 1985.
- Catholics, Anglicans and Puritans: Seventeenth Century Essays, 1987.
- The Golden Age of Europe: From Elizabeth I to the Sun King, edited by Hugh Trevor-Roper, 1987.
- From Counter-Reformation to Glorious Revolution, 1992.
- The Decline and Fall of the Roman Empire by Edward Gibbon, vol. 1 introduction (London: Everyman's Library, 1993).
- Letters from Oxford: Hugh Trevor-Roper to Bernard Berenson. Edited by Richard Davenport-Hines. London: Weidenfeld & Nicolson, 2006, ISBN 0-297-85084-9.
- Europe's Physician: The Various Life of Sir Theodore De Mayerne, 2007, ISBN 0-300-11263-7.
- The Invention of Scotland: Myth and History, 2008, ISBN 0-300-13686-2
- History and the Enlightenment: Eighteenth Century Essays, 2010, ISBN 0-300-13934-9

=== Primary sources ===
- Letters from Oxford: Hugh Trevor-Roper to Bernard Berenson edited by Richard Davenport-Hines (2007)
- My Dear Hugh: Letters from Richard Cobb to Hugh Trevor-Roper and Others edited by Tim Heald (2011) (does not contain any letters written by Trevor-Roper)
- One Hundred Letters From Hugh Trevor-Roper, edited by Richard Davenport-Hines and Adam Sisman (2013). Corrected paperback edition, 2015.
- The Wartime Journals: Hugh Trevor-Roper, Edited by Richard Davenport-Hines, 2011. ISBN 1-84885-990-2. Corrected paperback edition, 2015.
- Dacre made an extended appearance on the television programme After Dark in 1989.

== See also ==
- Bibliography of Adolf Hitler
- Historiography of the United Kingdom

Academic offices
Preceded by Grahame Clark	Master of Peterhouse, Cambridge; 1980–1987	Succeeded by Henry Chadwick
