= Albion (journal) =

Academic journal on British history

- Discipline: British history
- Language: English

Publication details
- History: 1969–2004
- Publisher: Appalachian State University

Standard abbreviations
- ISO 4: Albion

Indexing
- ISSN: 0095-1390
- LCCN: 74647909
- OCLC no.: 01479044

Links
- Journal homepage

Albion: A Quarterly Journal Concerned with British Studies was a peer-reviewed history journal publishing articles on aspects of British history of any period. It was published quarterly at Appalachian State University for the North American Conference on British Studies (NACBS) from 1969 until 2004, at which point it was merged into an expanded version of the NACBS's other journal, the Journal of British Studies, starting with volume 44 of the latter.

== See also ==
- Historiography of the United Kingdom
- Social history
