= Keith Feiling =

British historian

Keith Felling
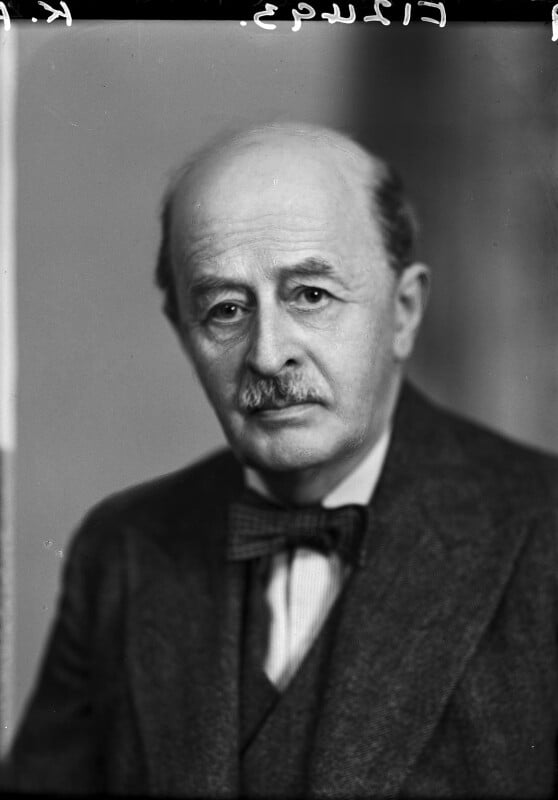
- Feiling in 1950
- Born: Keith Grahame Feiling; September 7, 1884; Leatherhead, Surrey, England
- Died: September 16, 1977 (aged 93)

Sir Keith Grahame Feiling OBE (7 September 1884 – 16 September 1977) was a British historian, biographer and academic. He was Chichele Professor of Modern History at the University of Oxford, from 1946 to 1950. He was noted for his conservative interpretation of the past, showing an empire-oriented ideology in defence of hierarchical authority, paternalism, deference, the monarchy, Church, family, nation, status, and place.

== Early life and education ==
He was born at Elms House, Leatherhead, the son of stockbroker Ernest Feiling and Joan Barbara (née Hawkins). His mother was the sister of novelist Sir Anthony Hope and a first cousin of Kenneth Grahame, who wrote the classic The Wind in the Willows. Keith was educated at Marlborough College, Marlborough, Wiltshire, and Balliol College, Oxford. He graduated with first-class honours in Modern History in 1906.

In 1907, he was appointed lecturer in history at the University of Toronto under Professor George MacKinnon Wrong. Two years later, he returned to Christ Church, Oxford to lecture and resume his studies toward a doctorate. When the First World War began, he was commissioned into the Royal Highlanders. In 1916, he was posted to India and served in Jhansi and Dalhousie. From 1917 to 1919, he worked as secretary to the Central Recruiting Board of India.

== Academic career ==
Following the war, Feiling returned to Oxford to teach and research. He was chairman of the Board of Modern History during 1922 to 1924, lecturer in Modern History from 1928 until 1936, and Ford's Lecturer in English History, 1931 to 1932. He also founded the Oxford University Conservative Association in 1924. He was Chichele Professor of Modern History at All Souls College, Oxford between 1946 and 1950, after which he retired and became Professor Emeritus. During this time, he also published a number of works.

A Tory Democrat, he felt that conservatives possessed more character than other people, as he tried to demonstrate in his books on the history of the Conservative Party. He acknowledged the necessity of reform—as long as it was gradual, top-down, and grounded not in abstract theory but in an appreciation of English history. Thus he celebrated the reforms of the 1830s. English historian A.J.P. Taylor in 1950 praised Feiling's historiography, calling it "Toryism" in contrast to the more common "Whig history", or liberal historiography, written to show the inevitable progress of mankind. Taylor explains, "Toryism rests on doubt in human nature; it distrusts improvement, clings to traditional institutions, prefers the past to the future. It is a sentiment rather than a principle."

== Honours ==
He was appointed an Officer of the Order of the British Empire in the 1919 New Year Honours for his work during the First World War. He was awarded the James Tait Black Award for his biography of Warren Hastings in 1954 and was knighted in the 1958 Birthday Honours.

For Feiling's 80th birthday in 1964, Hugh Trevor-Roper edited a festschrift, Essays in British history presented to Sir Keith Feiling with a foreword by Lord David Cecil.

== Personal life ==
In December 1912, he married Caroline (née Janson), with whom he had two daughters and one son. He died in a nursing home in Putney, London, aged 93.

== Published works ==
- Italian policy since 1870 (1914)
- A history of the Tory party, 1640-1714 (1924)
- England under the Tudors and Stuarts (1927)
- British foreign policy, 1660-1672 (1930)
- What is conservatism? (1930)
- The second Tory party, 1714-1832 (1938)
- The life of Neville Chamberlain (1946)
- The study of the modern history of Great Britain, 1862–1946; an inaugural lecture delivered before the University of Oxford on 1 February 1947 (1947)
- A history of England, from the coming of the English to 1918 (1950)
- Warren Hastings (1954)

== See also ==
- Historiography of the United Kingdom
