= Tunnel history =

English phrase

Tunnel history is a term coined by historian J. H. Hexter, to describe how historians divide past events into separate compartments, without connecting them.
