= Alexandra Lublinskaya =

Russian historian (1902–1980)

- Born: Alexandra Dmitrievna Lublinskaya; 1902
- Died: January 22, 1980 (aged 77–78)
- Other name: Historian

Alexandra Dmitrievna Lublinskaya (Russian: Александра Дмитриевна Люблинская, May 27, 1902 – January 22, 1980) was a Soviet scholar specialising in the history of seventeenth-century France, among other things.

Her French Absolutism, originally published in Russian in 1965, and translated into English by Brian Pearce, with a foreword by J. H. Elliott, was published by Cambridge University Press in 1968. It is a criticism of the general crisis of the 17th century thesis proposed by Hugh Trevor-Roper. The "general crisis" thesis generated controversy between supporters of this theory and those, such as the Marxist historian Eric Hobsbawm, who believed in the "general crisis," but saw the problems of 17th-century Europe as more social and economic in origin than Trevor-Roper would allow. A third faction comprised those who simply denied there was any "general crisis," including Lublinskaya, Dutch historian Ivo Schöffer and the Danish historian Niels Steensgaard.

Her professional publications number over 200, on a great variety of topics, but can be broken into three categories: works on paleography, critical publication of historical documents, and monographs and articles on the social and political history of medieval and early modern France ("the Middle Ages" in Soviet chronology extended to about 1650).

Her magnum opus was a series of books on the history of the administration of Richelieu. The first book was Frantsiia v nachale XVII veka (1610-1622 gg.) ("France at the beginning of the 17th century, 1610-1620") published in 1959. This was followed by French Absolutism: the Crucial Phase, 1620-1629 in 1965. A third book was published just before her death covering the years 1630–42. Another major work was Frantsuzskie krest'iane v XVI-XVIII vv. ("French peasants in the 16th-18th centuries"), published in 1978.

== English editions ==
- French Absolutism: The Crucial Phase, 1620-1629. Cambridge University Press (2008)
