= Journal of British Studies =

Academic journal on British culture

- Discipline: History of the British Isles
- Language: English
- Edited by: Jeffrey Collins; Sandra den Otter

Publication details
- History: 1961–present
- Publisher: Cambridge University Press for the North American Conference on British Studies (United States)
- Frequency: Quarterly
- Impact factor: 0.600 (2016)

Standard abbreviations
- ISO 4: J. Br. Stud.

Indexing
- ISSN: 0021-9371
- LCCN: 67001623
- JSTOR: 00219371
- OCLC no.: 1783237

Links
- Journal homepage

The publication of the North American Conference on British Studies, The Journal of British Studies is an academic journal aimed at scholars of British culture from the Middle Ages through the present. The journal was co-founded in 1961 by George Cooper. JBS presents scholarly articles and book reviews from international authors who share their ideas on British society, politics, law, economics, and the arts. Until 2005, it covered subjects from the medieval period to the present, while Albion (another journal published by the NACBS) covered all periods of British history. Albion was merged into the JBS as of vol. 44 in 2005. Until October 2012 the journal was published by University of Chicago Press. From volume 52, it has been published by Cambridge University Press.

According to the Journal Citation Reports, the journal has a 2016 impact factor of 0.600.

== See also ==
- Historiography of the United Kingdom
