= Brian Pearce =

British historian (1915–2008)

Brian Leonard Pearce

Brian Leonard Pearce (8 May 1915 – 25 November 2008) was a British Marxist political activist, historian, and translator. Adept and prolific in Russian-to-English translation, Pearce was regarded at the time of his death as "one of the most acute scholars of Russian history and British communism never to have held an academic post."

== Early years ==
Pearce was born in Weymouth, Dorset on 9 May 1915. His father was an upwardly mobile engineer, his mother a domestic servant of Irish extraction. Brian was their only child, a shy and precocious boy, poor at athletics and not popular among his peers. His father's growing prosperity allowed Brian the freedom to travel. In 1931 he went to Germany and in 1933 to France, where he further developed the language skills he had learned in school.

Although his parents were Tories, Brian's father investigated a few early issues of the Communist Party of Great Britain's organ, The Daily Worker, which Brian read thoroughly. He was also greatly influenced by an uncle who worked as a railwayman and was a partisan of the socialist Independent Labour Party. Brian also read various books and pamphlets he purchased on his own from a radical bookseller on Charing Cross Road.

Brian briefly worked for a company that produced trade journals before going away to University College London in 1934. While a history student there, he joined the Communist Party.

Pearce had been expected to get a first in History and win a scholarship to further pursue his research in the Tudor period, en route to a career in academia, but instead received an upper second on his last exam. His only choice if he was to proceed onto a PhD programme would be to work under the close direction of a supervisor on a topic not of his own choosing. He laboured at that unpleasant task for two years before discovering that another person was almost finished ploughing the same research ground, making award of a PhD unlikely. Pearce henceforth chose a different path.

== Career ==
Pearce married for the first time in 1939 to a party comrade, Lilla Fox. The pair had three children before separating in the late 1940s.

Pearce was drafted into the military early in 1940 and stationed in the north of England. His wartime experiences were uneventful.

After being demobilised, Pearce went to work in the civil service, where he learned Russian. He subsequently left the civil service to work in various Communist Party-related capacities, including as a member of the staff of The Daily Worker, for the Anglo-Soviet Friendship Society, and as a teacher of English at various East European embassies in London.

In 1953, Pearce joined a delegation of the British-Soviet Friendship Society and travelled to the Soviet Union. He was also a member of the Communist Party Historians Group, which conducted serious historical research into various questions of the British labour movement.

Pearce's world was rocked by the so-called Secret Speech delivered by Soviet leader Nikita Khrushchev in 1956. The revelations about the violent and criminal behaviour of Joseph Stalin's regime divided the CPGB between those who favoured becoming truly independent and thoroughly democratised and others who disregarded Khrushchev's revelations as hysterical and overblown and having no real relation to the situation facing the Communist Party in the UK. Pearce began contributing to an opposition journal, The Reasoner, which was terminated just as the Soviet invasion of Hungary took place. This event created an even wider fissure in the British Communist Party, ending in September 1957 with Pearce's expulsion from the CPGB.

After being expelled from the Communist Party, Pearce turned to Trotskyism as a member of the Socialist Labour League, a membership he retained for many years.

Pearce became a professional translator to make ends meet. He was skilled at his craft, combining accuracy with a highly readable style, and was a three-time winner of the Scott Moncrieff Prize for his work.

== Death and legacy ==
Pearce died on 25 November 2008. He was 93 years old.

At the time of his death, he was described as "one of the most acute scholars of Russian history and British communism never to have held an academic post." His papers are in the process of being catalogued at Aberdeen University, which will hold the Brian Pearce Archive.

== Selected works ==
=== Writings ===
- Early History of the Communist Party of Great Britain (London: Socialist Labour League, 1966).
- Essays on the History of Communism in Britain. With Michael Woodhouse. (Basingstoke: Macmillan, 1975).
- How Haig Saved Lenin. (London: Macmillan, 1987).
- The Staroselsky Problem, 1918–20: An Episode in British-Russian Relations in Persia (London: University of London, 1994).
- "The Brian Pearce Dossier", Revolutionary History, vol. 9, no. 3 (2006), pp. 105–143. —Selection of Pearce's correspondence.

=== Translations (partial list) ===
- E. Preobrazhensky, The New Economics (London: Oxford University Press, 1965).
- Leon Trotsky, The Intelligentsia and Socialism (London: Fourth International, 1966).
- Nikolai Valentinov, Encounters with Lenin. With Paul Rosta (London: Oxford University Press, 1968).
- A. D. Lublinskaya, French Absolutism: The Crucial Phase, 1620–1629 (Cambridge: Cambridge University Press, 1968).
- Ernest Mandel, Marxist Economic Theory. In two volumes (New York: Monthly Review Press, 1970).
- Ernest Mandel, The Formation of the Economic Thought of Karl Marx: 1843 to Capital (London: New Left Books, 1971).
- E.A. Preobrazhensky, From NEP to Socialism: A Glance into the Future of Russia and Europe (London: New Park Publications, 1973).
- Samir Amin, Accumulation on a world scale (New York: Monthly Review Press, 1974).
- Maxime Rodinson, Islam and Capitalism (London: Allen Lane, 1974, and Penguin, 1977)
- Marcel Liebman, Leninism Under Lenin (London: Jonathan Cape, 1975).
- Fernando Claudín, The Communist Movement from Comintern to Cominform. In two volumes (New York: Monthly Review Press, 1975).
- Leon Trotsky, Tasks Before the Twelfth Congress of the Russian Communist Party (London: New Park Publications, 1975).
- Samir Amin, Unequal Development (New York: Monthly Review Press, 1976).
- Charles Bettelheim, Class Struggles in the USSR. Volumes 1 and 2. (New York: Monthly Review Press, 1976–78).
- Carmen Claudín-Urondo, Lenin and the Cultural Revolution (Sussex: Harvester Press, 1977).
- Communist International, Baku: Congress of the Peoples of the East (London: New Park Publications, 1977).
- Roland Mousnier, The Institutions of France under the Absolute Monarchy, 1598–1789 (Chicago: University of Chicago Press, 1979).
- Leon Trotsky, How the Revolution Armed. In five volumes. (London: New Park Publications, 1979–1982).
- Leon Trotsky, The War Correspondence of Leon Trotsky: The Balkan Wars, 1912–13 (New York: Monad Press, 1980).
- F.F. Raskolnikov, Kronstadt and Petrograd in 1917. (London: New Park Publications, 1982).
- Maxime Rodinson, Israel and the Arabs (Penguin, 1982).
- Roy Medvedev, Khrushchev (New York: Anchor Press/Doubleday, 1983).
- Boris Kagarlitsky, The Thinking Reed: Intellectuals and the Soviet State from 1917 to the Present (London: Verso, 1988).
- Paul Veyne, Bread and Circuses (London: Allen Lane, 1990).
- Marc Ferro, Nicholas II: The Last of the Tsars (New York: Oxford University Press, 1993).
- Louis Châtellier, The Religion of the poor: rural missions in Europe and the formation of modern catholicism, c. 1500-1800 (Cambridge: University Press, 1997).
- Daniel Roche, A History of Everyday Things: The Birth of Consumption in France, 1600–1800 (Cambridge: Cambridge University Press, 2000)
- Sergo Beria, Beria, My Father: Inside Stalin's Kremlin (London: Gerald Duckworth and Co., 2001).
