= J. H. Hexter =

American historian (1910–1996)

- Born: Jack H. Hexter; May 25, 1910; Memphis, Tennessee, U.S.
- Died: December 8, 1996 (aged 86); St. Louis, Missouri, U.S.
- Education: University of Cincinnati (BA); Harvard University (MA, PhD)
- Occupation: Historian
- Employer(s): Queens College; Washington University in St. Louis; Yale University
- Spouse: Ruth Mullin (m. 1942)
- Children: 4

Jack H. Hexter (May 25, 1910 – December 8, 1996) was an American historian, a specialist in Tudor and seventeenth-century British history, and well known for his comments on historiography. Hexter was a member of both the American Academy of Arts and Sciences and the American Philosophical Society.

== Early career ==
Jack Hexter was born in Memphis, Tennessee, and was awarded a BA by the University of Cincinnati in 1931. He received his MA (1933) and PhD (1937) from Harvard University. His research interests encompassed both political and intellectual history, as witnessed by his first two books, one a history of the parliamentary conflict leading up to the Civil War, and the other a nuanced textual interpretation of Thomas More's Utopia.

== Scholarship and historiography ==
Hexter coined the term tunnel history.

Hexter's scholarly reputation probably owes as much to his historiographical critiques as to his body of research. He is noted for his distinction between "splitters" and "lumpers" of historical material, and his 1975 attack on Christopher Hill (as a "lumper" of selectively read sources). More to Hexter's fancy was the "splitter" who saw his responsibility to the full range of particulars and the ambiguity of historical sources. "Lumping" was the tendency that, according to Hexter, threatened to bind historians to overreaching generalizations, of which he suggested Marxism was the most typical and intellectually pernicious. Nonetheless, his essay appeared to argue that both tendencies (analysis and synthesis) were intellectually necessary.

== Storm over the gentry ==
This attack continued from a position he had earlier assumed, in his response in the late 1950s to a debate between Lawrence Stone and Hugh Trevor-Roper. Stone, along with R.H. Tawney, explained the origins of the English Civil War by positing that an increasingly well-off and ambitious gentry had, over the course of many years, destabilized the English state in which power had traditionally been divided between the aristocracy and the king. Trevor-Roper inverted this theory, arguing that in fact the Civil War was caused in part by court gentry who had fallen on bad times.

Hexter's contribution, puckishly titled "The Storm over the Gentry" and originally published in a popular magazine, contends that both theses are undermined by their authors' social determinism which causes them to overlook the ordinary business of the House of Commons. Hexter maintained that the overlooked group, the rural magnates, the wealthier of the country gentry, wielded the most influence in the House of Commons and had brought no real interest in revolution. To the contrary, their experience was in practical management and governance, and for the most part they did not act out of simple self-interest. The Civil War needs, therefore, to be seen as the story of how such solid, service-minded and economically comfortable men were persuaded to resist the King, and not as any particular group's economically motivated power grab.

His ultimate self-definition was overtly, unabashedly, and often polemically whiggish. For Hexter, the English Civil War was to be seen as the defence of traditional English liberties against an aggressive Crown. This position contrasted in the 1970s with the revisionist views of Conrad Russell and others who disputed both the uniqueness of the English Civil War and its connection with ideas of liberty. However, inasmuch as the revisionists were also explicitly anti-Marxist, their stance owed a great deal to Hexter's critiques. Russell in particular echoed Hexter's emphasis on continuity in English political values, Hexter's distinction between the Civil War and the subsequent Revolution, and Hexter's belief that contingencies better explained the coming of the War, while rejecting Hexter's view that Parliament was acting out of a clear-cut sense of constitutional obligation and embracing instead the view that religious conflicts and practical problems in the composite monarchy were more decisive.

Hexter in 1978 wrote a bitter historiographical review in which he attacked younger scholars for reducing the analysis of the Civil War to an essentially amoral struggle for power (socio-economic for the Marxists; religious, political and fiscal for the revisionists), which he argued was too dismissive of the intrinsic moral strength of Parliament's position. He thus declared his preference for the 19th-century narrative by Samuel Rawson Gardiner over the new interpretation, and, true to form, even adopted an exaggerated Whig-style argument: that one should recognize and accept the principles of the Parliamentary rebels because these ideas about freedom were the very foundation for our modern sense of political liberty.

== Hexter on Braudel ==
Another famous Hexterian intervention in historiography is his article "Fernand Braudel and the Monde Braudellien", which can be seen as a more appreciative, temperate, and intellectually sophisticated antecedent to Hexter's attack on Hill. Here, Hexter dissected Braudel's vast "geohistory", La Mediteranée, marvelling at the organization of the Annales School but pointing out the ironic tensions between the Annales' rigorous, collaborative, scientific institutional ethos and its leader's passionate, highly personal, often factually inaccurate or poorly sourced book (for which much of the intellectual labor was carried out from memory while Braudel was in a prisoner-of-war camp). The article also reveals Hexter's satirical touch, as, in its first section, Hexter mimics the quantitative bent of the Annales scholars, representing their output in a series of graphs and tables.

== Academic positions ==
His most prominent academic positions were at Queens College of the City University of New York from 1938 until 1957, Washington University in St. Louis from 1957 until 1964, and at Yale University from 1964 to 1978, becoming Charles Stillé Professor. The Yale Center for Parliamentary History was founded in 1966 under his directorship. He then returned to Washington University, where he founded the Center for the History of Freedom, and was named John M. Olin Professor Emeritus of the History of Freedom at Washington University, retiring in 1990. In this stead, he served as the founder and editor of the Stanford University Press Making of Modern Freedom series of books.

== Family ==
Hexter married Ruth Mullin in 1942; they had four children. He died of congestive heart failure in St. Louis, Missouri after suffering heart ailments for much of his adult life.

== Works ==
- The Reign of King Pym (1941) LCCN a410-4164
- More's Utopia: The Biography of an Idea (1952) 1976 edition. ISBN 0837189470.
- Storm Over the Gentry: The Tawney-Trevor-Roper Controversy (1958)
- Reappraisals in History: New Views on History and Society in Early Modern Europe (1961)
- Utopia, Thomas More (1965) edited with Edward Surtz, vol. 4 of the Yale Complete Edition of Thomas More
- The Judaeo-Christian Tradition (1966)
- The Traditions of the Western World (1967)
  - The Traditions of the Western World (Abridged). University Press of America. 1980. ISBN 9780819111807.
- Europe Since 1500 (1971) with R. Pipes and A. Molho ISBN 0060428147 LCCN 72-147642
- The History Primer (1971)
- Doing History (1971) ISBN 0253318203 LCCN 70-165049
- The Vision of Politics on the Eve of the Reformation: More, Machiavelli, and Seyssel (1973)
- On Historians: Reappraisals of the Masters of Modern History (1979) ISBN 0674634268 LCCN 78-16635
- The Monarchy of France, Claude De Seyssel (1981) translator with Michael Sherman, editor Donald R. Kelley
- The Traditions of the Western World: Antiquity through the Early Modern period (vol. 1) (1982)
- Parliament and Liberty from the Reign of Elizabeth to the English Civil War (1992) editor
