= The Scottish Historical Review =

Scottish Historical Review
- Discipline: History of Scotland
- Language: English
- Edited by: Aly Macdonald (pre-1707); Naomi Lloyd-Jones (post-1707); Chris Langley (special editions); Clare Loughlin (book reviews)

Publication details
- Former names: The Scottish Antiquary, Or, Northern Notes & Queries
- Publisher: Edinburgh University Press (Scotland)
- Frequency: Triannually

Standard abbreviations
- ISO 4: Scott. Hist. Rev.

Indexing
- ISSN: 0036-9241 (print); 1750-0222 (web)
- LCCN: 2008-242177
- OCLC no.: 60624888

Links
- Journal homepage; Online access

The Scottish Historical Review is an academic journal in the field of Scottish historical studies. It covers Scottish history from the early to the modern period, encouraging a variety of historical approaches. It superseded The Scottish Antiquary, Or, Northern Notes & Queries.

In addition to its original articles and book reviews, the Scottish Historical Review also includes lists of articles in Scottish history and essays on Scottish history in books published in the preceding year. It is published three times a year, in April, August and December, with the August issue typically forming a special edition. It is published by Edinburgh University Press for the Scottish Historical Review Trust.

== See also ==
- Historiography of Scotland
