= Historiography of Scotland =

The historiography of Scotland refers to the sources, critical methods and interpretive models used by scholars to come to an understanding of the history of Scotland.

== Middle Ages and Renaissance ==
Scottish historiography begins with Chronicles of the Picts and Scots, many of them written by monks in Latin. The first to adopt a critical approach to organising this material was also a monk, Andrew of Wyntoun in the 14th century. His clerical connections gave him access to sources in monasteries across Scotland, England and beyond, and his educated background perhaps fuelled his critical spirit. Nevertheless, he wrote his chronicle in a poetic format and at the behest of patrons. He begins his tale with the creation of angels. Nevertheless, his later volumes (closer to his own time) are still a prime source for modern historians. The critical spirit was taken forward by the Paris-based philosopher and historian John Mair, who weeded out many of the fabulous aspects of the story. Following him, the first Principal of Aberdeen University, Hector Boece further developed the evidence-based and critical approach. Bishop John Lesley, not only a scholar but, as a minister of the Scottish Crown, with unrivaled access to source materials, laid the foundations for modern historiography.

== Reformation ==
The disputes of the Reformation sharpened critical approaches on all sides, while the humanistic concern for ancient sources saw particular attention being devoted to the collection, conservation and organisation of historical evidence. George Buchanan was perhaps the greatest of the Scottish humanists. The importance of history to all sides in religious disputes led to divergence of views, but also further developed techniques of analysis during the 17th Century. This was also a time of an increasing demand by governments for data - statistical, administrative and legal - on their realms. This was another motor for systematic evidence collection and analysis. Many of the Scottish jurists - Lord Stair - contributed to the development of modern Scottish historiography.

== Enlightenment ==
The 18th century saw itself as the Age of Reason and in this climate of Enlightenment. Enlightenment historians tended to react with embarrassment to Scottish history, particularly the feudalism of the Middle Ages and the religious intolerance of the Reformation. Seemingly measured approaches were taken both by those who maintained a distinctly religious approach - such as Principal William Robertson - "The history of Scotland, during the reigns of Queen Mary and of King James VI. (London : 1759)" - and those who sought to escape from that perspective. Among the latter, the greatest was David Hume, in whose work we can see the beginnings of modern historiography. No doubt limited by his own perspective, and by the still limited evidence available, he nonetheless set out a picture of the development of Scottish history which still convinces many today. This century was also the century which saw the beginnings of a local archaeology, though this was still regarded somewhat of a personal eccentricity. The fact that Hume's "History of Great Britain" was very quickly renamed "History of England" is indicative of a change of focus that happened follow the Treaty of Union (1707) with England. Thereafter, a particularly Scottish historiography languished - whether in a romanticised nostalgia for a lost identity, or in continuing religious polemics. Scottish History became a sub-chapter in English history. Even so, great an historian as Lord McAuley wrote only a "History of England".

== Nineteenth century ==
In contrast to the Enlightenment, many historians of the early nineteenth century rehabilitated large areas of Scottish history as suitable for serious study. Lawyer and antiquarian Cosmo Innes, who produced works on Scotland in the Middle Ages (1860), and Sketches of Early Scottish History (1861), has been likened to the pioneering history of Georg Heinrich Pertz, one of the first writers to collate the major historical accounts of German history. Patrick Fraser Tytler's nine-volume history of Scotland (1828–43), particularity his sympathetic view of Mary, Queen of Scots, have led to comparisons with Leopold von Ranke, considered the father of modern scientific historical writing. Tytler was co-founder with Scott of the Bannatyne Society in 1823, which helped further the course of historical research in Scotland. Thomas M'Crie's (1797–1875) biographies of John Knox and Andrew Melville, figures generally savaged in the Enlightenment, helped rehabilitate their reputations. W. F. Skene's (1809–92) three part study of Celtic Scotland (1886–91) was the first serious investigation of the region and helped spawn the Scottish Celtic Revival. Issues of race became important, with Pinkerton, James Sibbald (1745–1803) and John Jamieson (1758–1839) subscribing to a theory of Picto-Gothicism, which postulated a Germanic origin for the Picts and the Scots language.

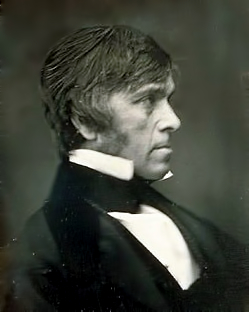
Thomas Carlyle, a major figure in Romantic historical writing

Among the most significant intellectual figures associated with Romanticism was Thomas Carlyle (1795–1881), born in Scotland and later a resident of London. He was largely responsible for bringing the works of German Romantics such as Schiller and Goethe to the attention of a British audience. An essayist and historian, he invented the phrase "hero-worship", lavishing largely uncritical praise on strong leaders such as Oliver Cromwell, Frederick the Great and Napoleon. His The French Revolution: A History (1837) dramatised the plight of the French aristocracy, but stressed the inevitability of history as a force. With French historian Jules Michelet, he is associated with the use of the "historical imagination". In Romantic historiography this led to a tendency to emphasise sentiment and identification, inviting readers to sympathise with historical personages and even to imagine interactions with them. In contrast to many continental Romantic historians, Carlyle remained largely pessimistic about human nature and events. He believed that history was a form of prophesy that could reveal patterns for the future. In the late nineteenth century he became one of a number of Victorian sage writers and social commentators.

Romantic writers often reacted against the empiricism of Enlightenment historical writing, putting forward the figure of the "poet-historian" who would mediate between the sources of history and the reader, using insight to create more than chronicles of facts. For this reason, Romantic historians such as Thierry saw Walter Scott, who had spent considerable effort uncovering new documents and sources for his novels, as an authority in historical writing. Scott is now seen primarily as a novelist, but also produced a nine-volume biography of Napoleon, and has been described as "the towering figure of Romantic historiography in Transatlantic and European contexts", having a profound effect on how history, particularly that of Scotland, was understood and written. Historians that acknowledged his influence included Chateaubriand, Macaulay, and Ranke.

== Twentieth century ==
In the 1960s, with the expansion of Higher Education, new Universities were established and with them new departments of history, some specialising in Scottish history. This allowed new attention to be paid to the particular geographic, demographic, governmental, legal and cultural structures of Scotland and to relate these to the wider European context, as well as those of Great Britain and its Empire. The distinctiveness of Scottish historiography now lies in its object of study rather than its approaches - though no doubt earlier historians can be glimpsed looking over their shoulders to events in England.

== Prominent historians ==
- John Bannerman
- G. W. S. Barrow – English historian and academic
- Steve Boardman – 20th-century Scottish medieval historian
- Hector Boece – Scottish philosopher and historian (1465–1536)
- George Buchanan – Scottish historian and humanist scholar (1506–1582)
- Gilbert Burnet – Scottish theologian and historian, and Bishop of Salisbury
- Tom Devine – Scottish historian
- John of Fordun – 14th century Scottish historian
- Colin Kidd – Scottish historian
- Michael Lynch – British historian
- Norman Macdougall – Scottish historian
- Rosalind Mitchison
- Richard Oram – Scottish historian
- Nigel Tranter – Scottish writer
- Christopher Whatley – Scottish historian
- Jenny Wormald – Scottish historian (1942–2015)

=== Historiographer Royal of Scotland ===
- James Fall, 1682
- William Robertson, 1763–1793
- John Gillies, 1793–1836
- George Brodie, 1836–1867
- John Hill Burton, 1867–1881
- William Forbes Skene, 1881–1893
- David Masson, 1893–1908
- Peter Hume Brown, 1908–1919
- Robert Rait, 1919–1930
- Robert Kerr Hannay FRSE, 1930–1940
- J. D. Mackie OBE, 1958–1978
- Gordon Donaldson, CBE, 1979–1993
- Christopher Smout, CBE, born 1933

== See also ==
- Historiography of the United Kingdom
