= David S. Katz =

Israeli historian

David S. Katz FRHistS
- דוד כ"ץ
- Education: Columbia University (BA); University of Oxford (DPhil)
- Occupation: Historian
- Employer: Brandeis University

David S. Katz FRHistS (Hebrew: דוד כ"ץ; born 1953) is director of the History of Ideas Program and a member of the Department of History at Brandeis University and Professor Emeritus of early modern European history at Tel Aviv University in Israel, where he taught from 1978 until retiring in 2019. He is also co-director of the Humanities Scholars Program at Brandeis. He held the Abraham Horodisch Chair for the History of Books (1994-2019) at Tel Aviv University and was director of the Lessing Institute for European History and Civilization (2006-2018). Katz received his B.A. from Columbia University (1974) and his D.Phil. from Oxford University (1978) where he was a pupil of Hugh Trevor-Roper (Lord Dacre). He was elected a fellow of the Royal Historical Society of England in 1993.

== Selected bibliography ==
- Philo-Semitism and the Readmission of the Jews to England, 1603-1655, Oxford University Press (Oxford), 1982.
- Sabbath and Sectarianism in Seventeenth-Century England, E.J. Brill (Leiden), 1988.
- (Editor, with Jonathan I. Israel) Sceptics, Millenarians, and Jews, E.J. Brill (Leiden), 1990.
- (Editor, with Yosef Kaplan) Gerush ve-shivah: Yehude Angliyah be-Hilufe ha-Zemanim (title means "Exile and Return: Anglo-Jewry through the Ages"), Israel Historical Society (Jerusalem), 1993.
- The Jews in the History of England, 1485-1850, Oxford University Press (Oxford), 1994.
- (with Richard H. Popkin) Messianic Revolution: Radical Religious Politics to the End of the Second Millennium, Hill & Wang (New York), 1998.
- (Editor, with James E. Force) Everything Connects: Essays in Honor of Richard H. Popkin, E.J. Brill (Leiden), 1998.
- God's Last Words: Reading the English Bible from the Reformation to Fundamentalism, Yale University Press (New Haven), 2004.
- The Occult Tradition: From the Renaissance to the Present Day, Jonathan Cape/Random House (London), 2005.
- The Shaping of Turkey in the British Imagination, 1776-1923, Palgrave Macmillan (London), 2016.
