= Lawrence Stone =

English historian (1919–1999)

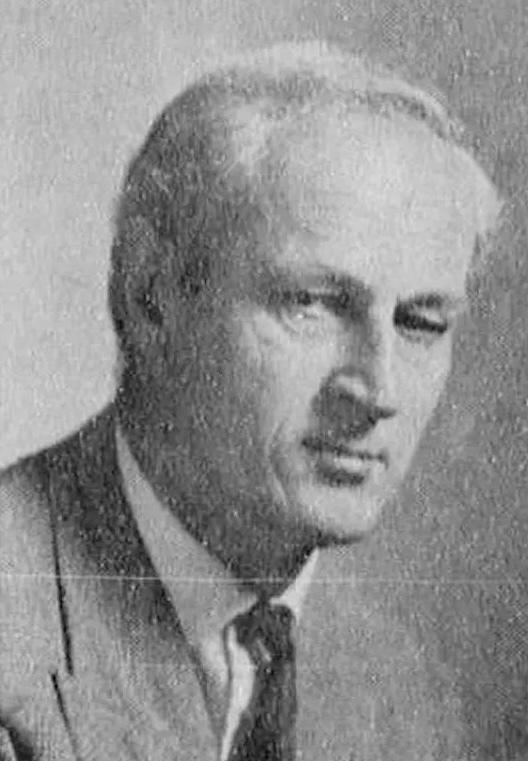
Stone, c. 1967

Lawrence Stone (4 December 1919 – 16 June 1999) was an English historian of early modern Britain, after a start to his career as an art historian of English medieval art. He is noted for his work on the English Civil War and the history of marriage, families and the aristocracy.

== Biography ==
Stone was born on 4 December 1919 in Epsom, Surrey, England. He was educated at Charterhouse School, an all-boys public school (i.e., a private boarding school). He studied for a time at the Sorbonne in Paris in 1938. He then studied modern history at Christ Church, Oxford from 1938 to 1940. His university studies were interrupted by service during the Second World War as a lieutenant in the Royal Naval Volunteer Reserve. He returned to Oxford after demobilisation in 1945, and after a further year of study, graduated with a first-class Bachelor of Arts (BA) degree in 1946. His BA degree was promoted to a Master of Arts (MA Oxon) degree in accordance with the regulations of the university.

After graduating, he remained at the University of Oxford. From 1946 to 1947, he was a Bryce Research Student. He then worked as a lecturer at University College, Oxford between 1947 and 1950. In 1950, he was elected a Fellow of Wadham College, Oxford. As such, he was a college tutor in history, and moved specialising in medieval history to Tudor history. For two years, from 1960 to 1961, he was also a member of the Institute for Advanced Study in Princeton, New Jersey. He was elected to the American Academy of Arts and Sciences in 1968 and the American Philosophical Society in 1970.

In 1963, Stone left Oxford and joined Princeton University as Dodge Professor of History. He served as chairman of the Department of History from 1967 to 1970, and in 1968 became the founding director of the Davis Center for Historical Studies, which was established to promote innovative methods of historical research. He retired in 1990.

Stone died on 16 June 1999 in Princeton, New Jersey, aged 79. He had been living with Parkinson's disease.

== Storm over the gentry ==
Stone began as a medievalist, and his first book was the volume on medieval sculpture in Britain for the Pelican History of Art. He was a bold choice by the series editor, Nicholas Pevsner, but the book was well received.

A 1948 article was Stone's earliest venture in the quantitative study of the rise of the gentry and decline of the aristocracy along the lines that his mentor R.H. Tawney had suggested in 1941. He concluded there was a major economic crisis for the nobility in the 16th and 17th centuries. Stone's argument was marred by methodological mistakes and he came under heavy attack from Hugh Trevor-Roper and others. Christopher Thompson, for example, showed that the peerage's real income was higher in 1602 than in 1534 and grew substantially by 1641. Many other scholars entered the fray and the so-called storm over the gentry became a central theme of English historiography for some time.

Stone in 1970 summed up the causes of the English Revolution by stressing three factors: the Crown's failure to gain an army or a bureaucracy; the relative rise of the gentry in terms of status, wealth, education, administrative experience, group identity, and political self-confidence; and the spread of Puritanism. Rabb notes that "few contemporary Stuart historians would argue with Stone's assessment."

=== Family history ===
Stone moved from the study of the political importance of families to studies of their internal structure, helping to open up the field of new social history. In The Family, Sex and Marriage in England, 1500–1800 (1977) Stone used quantitative methods to study family life. The book was very well received. Writing in the Times Literary Supplement, Keith Thomas described it as "easily Professor Stone's most ambitious book yet, even though it comes from the pen of a historian who has by now produced some 3,000 pages in hard covers. Lawrence Stone is one of the most buoyantly invigorating figures on the contemporary historical scene, and his new work displays his usual attributes: voracious reading, a striking capacity for synthesis and an ability to write vivid, continuously interesting prose... He has offered an indispensable chart to a landscape which it will take at least another generation of historians to explore with any precision. Indeed, The Family, Sex and Marriage is reminiscent of one of those pioneering maps from the age of discovery." Writing in the New York Review of Books, J H Plumb said "Professor Stone raises vast issues, settles them provocatively, and underpins his solutions with a wealth of illustration." Joseph Kett, in the New York Times Book Review, said "Vast in theme, exhaustive in research and with a cast of characters beyond counting, the result is a veritable War and Peace of social history. Truly, this is scholarship on the grand scale."

Some of his suggestions have been qualified by historians. Stone's suggestion that "affective individualism" did not become widely characteristic of marriage until the 18th century was questioned by medievalists who pointed to evidence of loving marriages before 1700. However, it was never Stone's position that love in marriage did not exist before the 18th century, and his book does not, in fact, say this.

Stone was a major advocate of the new social history—that is using the methods of the social sciences to study history and expanding the target of study to include larger and larger populations. Stone argued that using quantitative methods to assemble data could lead to useful generalizations about different periods in time. However, Stone never argued in favor of creating "laws" of history in the manner of Karl Marx or Arnold J. Toynbee. In Stone's view, the most one could do was to create generalizations about a particular century and no more. Stone was very much interested in studying the mentalité of people in the early modern period along the lines of the Annales School, but Stone rejected Fernand Braudel's geographical theories as too simplistic. Along the same lines, Stone was very fond of combining history with anthropology and offering "thick description" in the manner of Clifford Geertz.

== Narrative history ==
In 1979, the journal Past and Present—recognized since its establishment in 1952 as one of the leading platforms in Britain for discussions on history and the social sciences—published Lawrence Stone's influential article titled "The Revival of Narrative: Reflections on a New Old History.” In this essay, Stone observed that a major shift occurred in historical scholarship during the 1970s. The dominant belief of social science history, which held that the past could be explained through a coherent and scientific analysis of change, began to lose ground. Instead, historians started to focus more on the diverse dimensions of human life, emphasizing that cultural contexts and individual agency could be as significant as impersonal material or demographic factors in shaping historical developments. This intellectual transformation led to a renewed interest in narrative as a central mode of historical writing.

According to Stone, narrative is the main rhetorical device traditionally used by historians. In 1979, at a time when Social History of the previous generation was demanding a social-science model of analysis, Stone detected a revival in historiography of the narrative. Stone defined narrative as follows: it is organized chronologically; it is focused on a single coherent story; it is descriptive rather than analytical; it is concerned with people not abstract circumstances; and it deals with the particular and specific rather than the collective and statistical. He reported that, "More and more of the 'new historians' are now trying to discover what was going on inside people's heads in the past, and what it was like to live in the past, questions which inevitably lead back to the use of narrative."

Stone's methodology was mildly controversial.

Stone's supposed thesis that the British political elite was relatively "closed" to new members was widely accepted and popularized in works like Simon Schama's survey of the French Revolution, Citizens: A Chronicle of the French Revolution. It has recently been challenged by Ellis Wasson's Born to Rule: British Political Elites (2000) which argues that the ruling class was open to new members throughout the early modern period. In fact, Stone never argued to the contrary, and the difference appears to be one of degree.

== Works ==
- Sculpture in Britain: The Middle Ages, 1955 (2nd edn. 1972), Penguin Books (now Yale History of Art)
- An Elizabethan: Sir Horatio Palavicino (1956)
- The Crisis of the Aristocracy, 1558–1641 (1965)
- The Causes of the English Revolution, 1529–1642 (1972)
- Family and Fortune: Studies in Aristocratic Finance in the Sixteenth and Seventeenth Centuries (1973)
- "Early Modern Revolutions: An Exchange: The Causes of the English Revolution, 1529–1642: A Reply," Journal of Modern History Vol. 46, No. 1, March 1974
- The Family, Sex and Marriage in England, 1500–1800 (1977)
- "The Revival of Narrative: Reflections on a New Old History," Past and Present 85 (Nov. 1979) pp 3–24
- The Past and the Present (1981)
- An Open Elite? England 1540–1880 (1984) with Jeanne C. Fawtier Stone
- Road to Divorce: England, 1530–1987 (1990)
- Uncertain Unions: Marriage in England, 1660–1753 (1992)
- Broken Lives: Separation and Divorce in England, 1660–1857 (1993)
- An Imperial State at War: Britain from 1689 to 1815 (1994) editor
