= A. Wyatt Tilby =

British author and journalist

Aubrey Wyatt Tilby, known as A. Wyatt Tilby (1 April 1880 – 1 September 1948) was a British author, journalist and traveller. He was born in Addiscombe, Surrey.

After his mother died in 1885, Tilby (known as Alec) was looked after by his uncle, Thomas Martin Tilby and his wife Ellen in Islington, London. Having been told that his health was such that he was unlikely to live to adulthood, his surrogate parents later sent him to live with his Aunt Harriet in Eastbourne, where she educated him herself at home.

As a young adult he spent much of his time travelling and studying in Europe, mainly in Germany, Austria and Italy. In 1905 he joined the editorial staff of the Globe, during which time he also worked on his six-volume history, The English People Overseas. In 1915 he was appointed editor of the Evening Standard, but presumed tuberculosis forced him to reduce his journalistic commitments the following year. The illness left him with a permanently deformed hip which also prevented the continuation of his history writing; instead he turned to writing on philosophy.

A frequent contributor to The Edinburgh Review and The Nineteenth Century, he had a thirty-five-year association with The Glasgow Herald as a reviewer, special correspondent and (from 1944) a leader-writer. He also edited The Outlook from 1924 to 1928 and The Saturday Review from 1930.

Married to Kathleen (née Brewer) for thirty-nine years, he had three children and eight grandchildren. He died in Glasgow.

== Published works ==
- The English People Overseas Vol I–VI:
  - Volume I: The English people overseas. A History (Francis Griffiths, 1908)
  - Volume II: British India, 1600–1828 (Constable and Co., 1911)
  - Volume III: British North America, 1763–1867 (Constable and Co., 1911)
  - Volume IV: Britain in the Tropics, 1527–1910 (Constable and Co., 1912)
  - Volume V: Australasia, 1688–1911 (Constable and Co., 1912)
  - Volume VI: South Africa, 1486–1913 (Constable and Co., 1914)
- The Evolution of Consciousness (T. Fisher Unwin Ltd, 1922)
- The Quest of Reality (William Heinemann Ltd, 1927)
- Lord John Russell (Cassell & Company, 1930)
- Right, A Study in Physical and Moral Order (Williams and Norgate, 1933)
